= Kikkis bästa =

Compilation album by Kikki Danielsson
- Released: February 27, 2008
- Recorded: 1976–2006
- Genre: Country, Dansband music, Pop
- Label: Warner Bros./Mariann Grammofon AB

Kikki Danielsson chronology
I dag & i morgon (2006)	Kikkis bästa (2008)	Upp till dans (2009)

Kikkis bästa (English: Kikki's Best) was released on February 27, 2008, and is a double compilation album by Kikki Danielsson. It peaked at #15 at the Swedish album chart.

2008 was 35 years since Kikki Danielsson became lead vocalist in Wizex, and 30 years since her break-through at the Swedish Melodifestivalen 1978.

The album consists of well-known hits, but also rarer recordings, such as Right Night for Loving (Bra vibrationer with lyrics in English, which earlier had only been released outside Sweden and not been available on CD. The compilation also contains "That'll Be the Day", a recording Kikki Danielsson made with Wizex, which had only been on the flipside of a Christmas promo sent out by Mariann Grammofon AB in 1979.

== Track listing ==
=== CD 1 ===
1. Bra vibrationer
2. En timme för sent
3. 9 to 5
4. Miss Decibel (Wizex)
5. Lätta dina vingar
6. Minnet (Memory)
7. I dag & i morgon
8. Diggy Diggy Lo
9. Papaya Coconut
10. God morgon (Chips)
11. Ett hus med många rum (Roosarna)
12. Rock'n Yodel
13. När vi rör varann (Sometimes When We Touch)
14. Vem går med dig hem (Amico e), duet with Kjell Roos
15. Öppna vatten
16. En allra sista chans (Achy Breaky Heart)
17. I Love a Rainy Night
18. You Don't Have to Say You Love Me (Io che non vivo senza te)
19. Mitt innersta rum
20. I mitt hjärta brinner lågan (with Ole Ivars)
21. En enda gång
22. Sången skall klinga
23. Väntar ännu på den morgon (Waiting for the Morning)

=== CD 2 ===
1. Dag efter dag
2. Mycke' mycke' mer
3. Hem till Norden with (Roosarna)
4. Vem é dé du vill ha
5. Ge mig sol, ge mig hav
6. Jag trodde änglarna fanns (with Ole Ivars)
7. Dagar som kommer och går
8. Cowboy Yodel Song
9. Talking in Your Sleep
10. Här är jag igen (Here You Come Again)
11. Rädda pojkar
12. Och vi hörde klockor ringa (Les trois cloches)
13. Varför är kärleken röd?
14. Amazing Grace
15. That'll Be the Day
16. Se dig i din spegel
17. Stand by Your Man
18. Flyg fri
19. Singles Bar
20. Good Year for the Roses
21. Som en sol
22. Vi låser dörren in till damernas (Let's Talk it over in the Ladies Room)
23. El Lute
24. Right Night for Loving (Bra vibrationer)

== Charts ==
Chart (2008)	Peak position
Sweden (Sverigetopplistan)	15
