= Har du glömt? =

Single by Wasa
- Released: July 1975
- Genre: dansband music
- Label: Polar
- Songwriters: Jan Askelind, Conny Modig

"Har du glömt?" is a song written by Jan Askelind and Conny Modig. It was originally recorded by Wasa on the 1975 album Wasa 1975, recorded on the Polar Music record label, and also released as a single in July that year.

In 1976, the song was recorded by Wizex on the album Har du glömt? as a vocal duet between Kikki Danielsson & Tommy Stjernfeldt, while Leif Bloms recorded it on their 1976 album Här igen . In 1976 it was also recorded by Vikingarna on the album Kramgoa låtar 3 and by Jigs.

Vikingarna recorded the song in 1978, with lyrics in English as Where Were You, on the album The Vikings Export, and Svenne & Lotta recorded it in the same language that year on the album Bring It Home.

The song was also recorded in Swedish by Kikki Danielsson and Kjell Roos as a duet for the 1998 Kikki Danielssons orkester album Dagar som kommer och går. In 2013, Larz Kristerz recorded the song in Swedish on the album Det måste gå att dansa till. The Danish singer Gitte Hænning (Haenning, Henning) who is based in Germany made the German version in 1976 Happy end. The title is in English but the rest in German, But she also made an English version At the end 1976 and a third in Frensch to the Canadian market Aime-Moi 1976. The Danish version Har du glemt? was sung by the duo Jens & Peter in 1976.

The song is a well-known dansband song, usually performed as a duet between a male and a female singer where the male sings the verses, the female the refrains. In the verses, the male complains over the female sometimes ignoring him, and the female asks if the male has forgotten how he used to charm her, and would even be prepared to fight for her when they were younger.
