= Bra vibrationer =

- Album cover

Studio album by Kikki Danielsson
- Released: April 1985
- Recorded: KMH Studios, Stockholm, February–March 1985
- Genre: Country pop, schlager
- Label: Mariann Records

Kikki Danielsson chronology
Kikkis 15 bästa låtar (1984)	Bra vibrationer (1985)	Papaya Coconut (1986)

Bra vibrationer (English: Good Vibrations) is a studio album from Kikki Danielsson, released in April 1985. The album reached number 12 on the Swedish Albums Chart.

== Track listing ==
=== Side A ===
#	Title	Songwriter	Length
1.	"Bra vibrationer"	Lasse Holm, Ingela Forsman	3:03
2.	"Vem går med mig hem ("Amico e")", duet with Kjell Roos	Dario Baldan Bembo, Sergio Bardotti, Nini maria Giacomelli, Ingela Forsman	4:01
3.	"Mitt innersta rum"	Anders Glenmark, Ingela Forsman	4:09
4.	"Du (Hello)"	Lionel Richie, Keith Almgren	3:53
5.	"Om det är så (If This Is It)"	Johnny Colla, Huey Lewis, Monica Forsberg	3:36
6.	"Om kärleken ger mig en chans till (If Ever You're in My Arms Again)"	Michael Masser, Tom Snow, Cynthia Weil, Ingela Forsman	3:56

=== Side B ===
#	Title	Songwriter	Length
7.	"Vi låser dörren in till damernas (Let's Talk it over in the Ladies Room)"	Peter Koelewijn, Ingela Forsman	3:45
8.	"En bra dag att försonas"	Lasse Holm, Ingela Forsman	3:08
9.	"Baby I Lied"	Deborah Allen, Rory Bourke, Rafe Van Hoy	4:18
10.	"Flyg fri"	Lasse Holm, Monica Forsberg	3:01
11.	"Love Can Hurt"	Lasse Holm, Ingela Forsman	4:23
12.	"Half a Boy Half a Man"	Nick Lowe	2:56

== Charts ==
Chart (1985)	Peak position
Swedish Albums (Sverigetopplistan)	12
