= På lugnare vatten =

Studio album by Kikki Danielsson & Roosarna
- Released: 1990
- Genre: Dansband music
- Length: 45 minutes
- Label: Mariann Grammofon AB

Kikki Danielsson & Roosarna chronology
Livet är nu (1988)	På lugnare vatten (1990)	En enda gång (1992)

På lugnare vatten is a 1990 studio album from Kikki Danielsson & Roosarna. "Vägg i vägg" is a lyrics version in Swedish of the song "Eitt lag enn", which when performed by Stjórnin finished 4th for Iceland at the Eurovision Song Contest 1990. "Cliff medley" is a combination of Cliff Richard hits. The album also contains cover versions on artists and groups as Ted Gärdestad, ABBA and Tanita Tikaram.

== Track listing ==
#	Title	Songwriter	Length
1.	"Vem vet (I Might)"	Gary Sulsh, Stewart Leathwood, Barrie Guard, Ingela Forsman	
2.	"Låt kärleken slå rot"	Ted Gärdestad, Kenneth Gärdestad	
3.	"Vägg i vägg (Eitt lag enn)"	Hördur G. Olafsson, Keith Almgren	
4.	"På lugnare vatten"	Kjell Roos, Keith Almgren	
5.	"Vi ska dansa hela natten"	Jörgen Johansson, Pierre Breidensjö, Anelie Berg	
6.	"Cliff-medley"		
6. 1	"Living Doll"	Lionel Bart, Pierre Breidensjö	
6. 2	"Travellin' Light"	Sid Tepper, Roy C. Bennett	
6. 3	"The Young Ones""	Sid Tepper, Roy C. Bennett	
7.	"Ge mig sol, ge mig hav"	Martin Klaman, Keith Almgren, Ulf Söderberg	
8.	"Längtans vind"	Tommy Stjernfeldt, Kjell Roos	
9.	"Hollywood"	Kjell Roos, Kikki Danielsson	
10.	"Blå nätter (Blue Nights of Hawaii)"	Wolff-Eckehardt Stein, Klaus Lindner, Ingela Forsman	
11.	"Det var det ingenting på (Why did it Have to be Me)"	Benny Andersson, Björn Ulvaeus, Stikkan Andersson	
12.	"I god tradition (Good Tradition)"	Tanita Tikaram, Keith Almgren	
13.	"Dansa hela natten"	Martin Klaman	
