= Jag trodde änglarna fanns =

Song
- Language: Swedish, Norwegian
- Released: 1999
- Songwriter(s): William Kristoffersen

"Jag trodde änglarna fanns" is a song written by William Kristoffersen, which was recorded as a vocal duet by Kikki Danielsson and Ole Ivars in 1999, becoming a major hit in Norway.

The song originally appeared on Danielsson's 1999 compilation album I mitt hjärta and Ole Ivars' studio album Ole Ivars i 2000, also 1999. It was also released in Norway in 1999 as the B-side for the Ole Ivars single "I mitt hjärta brinner lågan", also a duet with Danielsson.

In 2011, Danielsson re-recorded the song for her album Första dagen på resten av mitt liv.

== Other recordings ==
- The song has been recorded by Claes Lövgrens on the 2002 album Rosor från himlen. and Matz Bladhs in 2006. It was also recorded by Bengt Hennings on the 2009 album Låt kärleken slå till. In 2013, Ole Ivars recorded the song with Lynn Anderson, in English as "You Are the Light of My Life".
- In May 2017, the song was recorded by Kamferdrops in a more modern version and on 12 May the same year it was released in Norway and Sweden. Kamferdrops made her first live appearance with the song at TV4:s Sommarkrysset on 10 June that year.

== Charts ==
=== Kamferdrops recording ===
Chart (2017)	Peak position
Norway (VG-lista)	33
Sweden (Sverigetopplistan)	2
