= Vägen hem till dej =

Studio album by Kikki Danielsson
- Released: 1991
- Recorded: second half of 1990, Polar Studios
- Genre: Country; Pop
- Label: Polygram

Kikki Danielsson chronology
På begäran (1990)	Vägen hem till dej (1991)	In Country (1992)

Vägen hem till dej is a 1991 studio album from Swedish pop and country singer Kikki Danielsson.

== Track listing ==
#	Title	Songwriter	Length
1.	"Vägen hem till dej"	Martin Klaman, Hans Skoog	?
2.	"Vi har ett eget paradis"	Martin Klaman, Hans Skoog	?
3.	"En annan stad, en annan vän (Another Town, Another Train)"	Benny Andersson, Björn Ulvaeus, Stikkan Anderson	?
4.	"You're My World (Il mio mondo)"	Umberto Bindi, Gino Paoli, Carl Sigman	?
5.	"Kärlekens vingar"	Peter Åhs, Karl Fridolfsson	?
6.	"Den enda sanna kärleken"	Lasse Holm	?
7.	"Samma vindar, samma hav"	Martin Klaman, Hans Skoog	?
8.	"Tell Him"	Bert Russell	?
9.	"Det största som hänt (The Star)"	Lee Arnold Bach, Kikki Danielsson	?
10.	"Inget stoppar oss nu"	Lasse Holm, Ingela Forsman	?
11	"Ge dig av (Tear it up)"	James Cates, Pat Terry, Kikki Danielsson	?
12.	"En ton i trädens kronor (Emigrantvisan)"	Traditionell, arrangemang Rutger Gunnarsson och Ingela Forsman	?
13.	"Du gör mig galen (You're Taking too Long)"	Lee Roy Parnell, Rory Michael Bourke, Gary Nicholson, Kikki Danielsson	?

== Contributing musicians ==
- Kikki Danielsson, vocals
- Peter Ljung, keyboard
- Lasse Wellander, guitar
- Klas Anderhell, drums
- Rutger Gunnarsson, bass
