= Livet är nu =

Studio album by Roosarna
- Released: 1988
- Studio: Sommerland Muskistudio
- Genre: Dansband
- Label: Mariann Records
- Producers: Mikael Wendt (tracks 1–7 and 9–12), Rutger Gunnarsson (track 8)

Roosarna chronology
I kväll är det party (1985)	Livet är nu (1988)	På lugnare vatten (1990)

Livet är nu is a 1988 studio album from Swedish dansband Roosarna, with Kikki Danielsson.

== Track listing ==
=== Side A ===
1. Santo Domingo 3:58
2. Livet är nu 3:03
3. Din natt 2:52
4. En man med många drömmar 2:35
5. Guld & diamanter 3:04
6. Jag har hittat hem 2:43

=== Side B ===
1. Du och jag 3:30
2. Kärlekens spion 2:55
3. Jag är fri 3:10
4. 11 23 22 2:54
5. Jag ser dej varje dag 4:00
6. Kärleken är min 2:37
