= Dagar som kommer och går =

Studio album by Kikki Danielssons orkester
- Released: 12 November 1998
- Recorded: 1998
- Genre: Dansband music, Pop
- Length: 47 minutes
- Label: Mariann Grammofon

Kikki Danielssons orkester chronology
Ett hus med många rum (1997)	Dagar som kommer och går (1998)	Vad livet har att ge (2005)

Dagar som kommer och går is a studio album from Swedish dansband Kikki Danielssons orkester, formerly known as Kikki Danielsson & Roosarna. It was released in 1998.

== Track listing ==
No.	Title	Writer(s)	Length
1.	"Den enda sanna mannen"	Lasse Holm, Gert Lengstrand
2.	"Mitt hjärta slår för dig"	Mikael Wendt, Christer Lundh
3.	"En gång till"	Michael Saxell
4.	"Har du glömt" (duet: Kikki Danielsson–Kjell Roos)	Jan Askelind, Christer Modig
5.	"Silverfallet"	Mikael Wendt, Christer Lundh
6.	"Dagar som kommer och går"	Carl-Henry Kindbom, Thomas Thörnholm
7.	"Ta en dag i taget"	Carl-Henry Kindbom, Carl Lösnitz
8.	"Bara att se dig igen"	E. Andersson, A. Johnson
9.	"Min egen väg"	Lasse Holm, Ingela Forsman
10.	"Varje gång det handlar om kärlek"	Ulf Georgsson
11.	"I morgondagens ljus"	Mikael Wendt, Christer Lundh
12.	"Tropical Depression"	Alan Jackson, Jim McBride, Charlie Craig
13.	"Natten är vår"	Thomas Haglund, Göran Lomæus, Tomas Höglund
14.	"When I Found You"	Carl-Henry Kindbom, Carl Lösnitz, Per-Ola Pettersson
15.	"Papaya Coconut (Come along)" (Kikki Danielsson & Dr. Alban)	Lasse Holm, Ingela Forsman, Dr. Alban

== Svensktoppen ==
- The title track "Dagar som kommer och går" (Swedish: "Days who come and pass"), whose theme is to find happiness all the seasons of the year and save the time who gives good memories, failed to enter Svensktoppen.
