= Canzone d'Amore =

- Album cover

Studio album by Kikki Danielsson
- Released: June 1989
- Recorded: KMH Studio, Stockholm
- Genres: Country pop, schlager
- Length: 46 minutes
- Label: Mariann Records

Kikki Danielsson chronology
Min barndoms jular (1988)	Canzone d'Amore (1989)	På begäran (1990)

Canzone d'Amore is a studio album from Kikki Danielsson, released in June 1989. The album reached #48 place at the Swedish album chart.

== Track listing ==
=== Side A ===
#	Title	Songwriter	Length
1.	"Canzone d' Amore"	Salvatore Cutugno, Dario Farina, Lars Wiggman	3.55
2.	"Lätta dina vingar"	Martin Klaman, Keith Almgren	3.09
3.	"En vit liten lögn"	Lasse Holm, Ingela Forsman	3.23
4.	"Den enda jord vi har"	Tommy Seebach, Jörgen de Mylius, Jacob Dahlin	3.05
5.	"Här går en annan"	Martin Klaman, Hans Skoog	2.38
6.	"Jag är på väg (I'm on My Way)"	Charlie Reid, Craig Charlie, Ulf Söderberg	3.35
7.	"Du var en del av mig (I Dit it for Your Love)"	Glenn Frey, Jack Tampchin, Kikki Danielsson	3.54

=== Side B ===
#	Title	Songwriter	Length
8.	"Farväl och tack (Farvel og tak)"	Søren Bundgaard, Kel Heick, Kikki Danielsson	2.36
9.	"Det är nu"	Bob Crewe, Sandy Linzer, Monica Forsberg	3.22
10.	"Det finns en sol"	Martin Klaman, Hans Skoog	2.57
11.	"Öppna vatten"	Pierre Breidensjö, Jörgen Johsnsson	2.48
12.	"Du kom till världen"	Søren Bundgaard, Kel Heick, Kikki Danielsson	3.30
13.	"Fångad (Standing in the Twilight)"	Alice May, Jane Larson	3.23
14.	"Väntar ännu på den morgon (Waiting for the Morning)"	Jon Terje Rovedal, Susanne Alfvengren	4.34

== Contributing musicians ==
- Kikki Danielsson, vocals
- Per Lindvall, drums
- Sam Bengtsson, bass
- Hasse Rosén, guitar
- Peter Ljung, keyboard

== Charts ==
Chart (1989)	Peak position
Swedish Albums (Sverigetopplistan)	48
