= Ett hus med många rum =

Studio album by Kikki Danielssons orkester
- Released: 5 November 1997
- Recorded: 1997
- Genres: Country, Dansband music
- Length: 49 minutes
- Label: Mariann Grammofon
- Producer: Mikael Wendt

Kikki Danielssons orkester chronology
Hem till Norden (1996)	Ett hus med många rum (1997)	Dagar som kommer och går (1998)

Ett hus med många rum is a studio album from Swedish dansband Kikki Danielssons orkester, formerly known as Kikki Danielsson & Roosarna. It was released in November 1997.

== Track listing ==
No.	Title	Writer(s)	Length
1.	"Ett hus med många rum"	Lasse Holm, Ingela Forsman
2.	"Kärleken har fått vingar"	Per Arne Thigerberg, Peter Bergqvist, Hans Backström
3.	"Som ett ljus"	Mikael Wendt, Christer Lundh
4.	"Jag kan aldrig leva utan dig"	Mikael Wendt, Christer Lundh
5.	"Låt ett ljus få brinna" (Love Shine a Light)	Kimberley Rew, Mikael Wendt, Christer Lundh
6.	"Låt oss leva för varann"	Thomas Thörnholm, Magnus Nordqvist
7.	"Tro mig om du vill"	Mikael Wendt, Christer Lundh
8.	"Lova mig att alltid stanna här"	Mikael Wendt, Christer Lundh
9.	"Tjejer"	Peter Åhs
10.	"Du ska veta"	Thomas Thörnholm, Carl Lösnitz
11.	"Aldrig ta farväl"	Thomas Thörnholm, Magnus Nordqvist
12.	"Jag älskar dig"	Bo Fransson, Kristina Morgärds
13.	"Om det är mig du vill ha"	Mikael Wendt, Christer Lundh
14.	"Make it through the Gray"	Michael Saxell, Chris Moore
15.	"Kärlekens vindar"	Jörgen Andersson, Jörgen Persson
16.	"Stilla stormen"	Michael Saxell

== Svensktoppen ==
Four of the songs were tested for the Swedish hitlist Svensktoppen.

=== Kärlekens vindar ===
"Kärlekens vindar" was on Svensktoppen during the period 21 June-26 July 1997. The song was on Svensktoppen for five weeks, with a 4th place as best result there.

=== Tjejer ===
"Tjejer" was on Svensktoppen during the period 13 September-4 October 1997. The song was on Svensktoppen for three weeks, with an 8th place as best result there.

=== Ett hus med många rum ===
The title track "Ett hus med många rum", written by Lasse Holm and Ingela "Pling" Forsman, is a peace song which was made for the year 2000. The song was on Svensktoppen during the period 3–17 January 1998. The song was on Svensktoppen for three weeks, with a 6th place as best result there.

=== Kärleken har fått vingar ===
"Kärleken har fått vingar" was on Svensktoppen during the period 21 March-2 May 1998. The song was on Svensktoppen for six weeks, with a 5th place as best result there.
