= I dag & i morgon =

Compilation album by Kikki Danielsson
- Released: April 12, 2006
- Recorded: 1986–2006
- Genre: Country, dansband music, pop
- Length: 75 minutes, 57 seconds
- Label: Mariann Grammofon AB

Kikki Danielsson chronology
Nu är det advent (2001)	I dag & i morgon (2006)	Kikkis bästa (2008)

I dag & i morgon was released on April 12, 2006, and is a compilation album from Swedish pop and country singer Kikki Danielsson. The album also contains four new-released recordings: "Yesterday Once More", "Looking for Freedom", "Blue Virgin Isles" and The Eagles' classic "New Kid in Town", which originally were supposed to be on an album planned for 2001 but never released.

== Track listing ==
- The album cover has the wrong track listing. The album does not contain Ju mer jag ser, as listed. The track listing is also not numbered correctly for all tracks. The inner cover has the correct track listing.
1. I dag & i morgon - 3.00
2. Yesterday Once More - 4.50
3. Jag trodde änglarna fanns - 3.18 (duet: Kikki Danielsson - Tore Halvorsen)
4. Jag har börjat leva nu - 3.24
5. Looking for Freedom - 3.45
6. I mitt hjärta brinner lågan - 3.22 (duet: Kikki Danielsson - Tore Halvorsen)
7. Dagar som kommer och går - 3.30
8. Fri - 3.30
9. Easy Come Easy Go - 3.01
10. Blue Virgin Isles - 4.28
11. Ett hus med många rum - 3.07
12. New Kid in Town - 5.33
13. En timme för sent - 3.45
14. Långt bortom bergen - 3.06
15. Every Face Tells a Story - 3.43
16. Regnet som föll igår - 4.20
17. Jag är på väg (I'm on My Way) - 3.35
18. Handen som rörde mig - 3.05
19. Don't Forget to Remember Me - 3.20
20. Get to the Church - 3.25
21. Har du glömt - 2.45
