= En enda gång =

Studio album by Kikki Danielsson & Roosarna
- Released: 1992
- Genre: Country, Dansband music
- Length: 48 minutes

Kikki Danielsson & Roosarna chronology
På lugnare vatten (1990)	En enda gång (1992)	Vet du vad jag vet (1994)

En enda gång is a 1992 studio album from Kikki Danielsson & Roosarna. The tracks "En enda gång", "Kvällens sista dans" and "Natt efter natt" were tested for Svensktoppen, but only "En enda gång" managed to enter the chart.

== Track listing ==
=== Side A ===
#	Title	Songwriter	Length
1.	"En enda gång"	Martin Klaman, Hans Skoog	
2.	"Take Good Care of My Baby"	Carole King, Gerry Goffin	
3.	"Sjunger i regnet"	Martin Klaman, Lars Y. Johansson, Ingela Forsman	
4.	"Du finns i mina drömmar"	Björn Axelsson, Martin Klaman	
5.	"Ring mig i morgon"	Anders Glenmark, Kikki Danielsson	
6.	"Jag önskar dig allt gott på Jorden"	Martin Klaman, Hans Skoog	
7.	"My Love"	Tony Hatch	

=== Side B ===
#	Title	Songwriter	Length
8.	"Natt efter natt"	Martin Klaman, Hans Skoog	
9.	"När du kommer"	Ted Gärdestad, Kenneth Gärdestad	
10.	"You Don't Have to Say You Love Me (Io che non vivo senza te)"	Pino Donaggio, Vito Pallavicini, Vicki Wickham, Simon Napier Bell	
11.	"Rockin' Robin"	Jimmie Thomas	
12.	"Come on over"	Barry Gibb, Robin Gibb	
13.	"Härom da'n"	Kim Larsen, Börje Carlsson	
14.	"Kvällens sista dans"	Martin Klaman, Hans Skoog	
15.	"En enda gång (karaoke version)"	Martin Klaman, Hans Skoog	
