= Min barndoms jular =

- Album cover

Studio album by Kikki Danielsson
- Released: December 1987 (original); November 1, 2001
- Recorded: 1987
- Genre: Christmas (Country pop, schlager)
- Label: TMC

Kikki Danielsson chronology
Papaya Coconut (1986)	Min barndoms jular (1987)	Canzone d'Amore (1989)

Alternative cover
- Cover of the 2001 release, Nu är det advent

Min barndoms jular is a Christmas album from Kikki Danielsson, released in December 1987. It peaked at 19th position at the Swedish Albums Chart

== Album release ==
Years later, incorrect sources begun to state that the album was released on November 1, 1988.

The album combines old and newer Christmas songs, and is largely a concept album, as many of the songs wrre Kikki Danielsson's Christmas time childhood favourites. Many of the songs contain references to Christmas memories from childhood and youth, while other songs have a Christian Christmas theme, with the birth of Jesus as theme.

The album was rereleased on November 1, 2001, named Nu är det advent. This version also included "Nu är det advent", a duet with Janne Önnerud, as a "bonus track". This song, which became the first album track, was at Svensktoppen for six weeks during the period December 9, 2000 – January 27, 2001, peaking at #3.

Kikki Danielsson's daughter, who was born in 1985, featured on the cover of the album alongside Danielsson.

== Track listing ==
=== 1987 original ===
#	Title	Songwriter	Length
1.	"Vår vackra vita vintervärld ("Winter Wonderland")/Jingeling Tingeling (Sleigh Ride)"	Felix Bernard, Lars Green, Leroy Anderson, Bebbe Wolgers	2:42
2.	"Min barndoms jular"	Jan-Erik Pettersson, Bo Senter	3:11
3.	"Det hände sig för länge sen (Mary's Boy Child)"	Jester Hairston, Jan Erixon	2:40
4.	"När juldagsmorgon glimmar"	Betty Ehrenborg-Posse	2:02
5.	"I kväll jag tänder ett ljus"	Ingvar Hellberg	3:10
6.	"Jag vill hem till julen (With Bells on)"	Dolly Parton, Karin Stigmark	2:40
7.	"Jag önskar er alla en riktigt god jul"	Paul Sahlin, Torgny Söderberg	3:20
8.	"När ljusen tändas därhemma (When It's Lamp Lighting Time in the Valley)"	Joe Lyons, Sam Hart, Nils Hellström	3:11
9.	"I juletid (Save Your Love)" (duet Kikki Danielsson-Kjell Roos)	John Edward, Sue Edward, Kikki Danielsson	3:11
10.	"En tokig sång" (The Silly Song)	Frank Churchull, Bernt Dahlbäck	2:19
11	"Låt mig få tända ett ljus (Schlaf, mein Prinzchen, schlaf ein)"	Bernhard Flies, Börje Carlsson	2:40
12.	"Hosianna, Davids son"	Georg Joseph Vogler	1:57

=== 2001 bonus tracks ===
#	Title	Songwriter
1.	"Nu är det advent" (duet Kikki Danielsson-Janne Önnerud)	Dan Attlerud

== Charts ==
Chart (1987–1988)	Peak position
Swedish Albums (Sverigetopplistan)	19
