= Carina (Larz-Kristerz song) =

Single by Larz-Kristerz

from the album Hem till dig
- A-side: "Carina"
- B-side: "Carina" (karaoke version)
- Released: 28 January 2009
- Genre: dansband music
- Songwriters: Christian Antblad, Mats Ymell

Larz-Kristerz singles chronology
"Carina" (2009)	""Hem dill tig"" (2009)

"Carina" is a 2008 song written by Christian Antblad and Mats Ymell and performed by Larz-Kristerz. The song was originally performed through the TV program Dansbandskampen and became a successful early 2009 single.

The song was originally performed by Larz-Kristerz at the final of Dansbandskampen on 20 December 2008. The single was released on 28 January 2009, and also became available on the band's 2009 album Hem till dig.

On 6 February 2009, the single topped the Swedish singles chart, thus making Larz-Kristerz the first dansband ever to top the chart.

The song entered Svensktoppen on 22 February 2009, where it stayed for 10 weeks peaking at third position.

Bengt Hennings performed an own version of the song at Bingolotto on 18 January 2009, which was recorded on the 2009 album Låt kärleken slå till, as "Carina (jag måste ringa)". Larz-Kristerz also performed a jazz version of the song at Babben & Co in 2009.

On 12 July 2009 the song was awarded the Guldklaven dansband award for "Song of the year" during Svenska dansbandsveckan in Malung.

At Dansbandskampen 2009 the song was used as final song, and was performed in different versions by The Playtones and Titanix, where the Playtones won, while the Larz-Kristerz stood at stageside, cheering. During a Dansbandskampen 2010 pause act Larz-Kristerz appeared, performing the song.

== Charts ==
=== Weekly charts ===
Chart (2009)	Peak position
Sweden (Sverigetopplistan)	1

=== Year-end charts ===
Chart (2009)	Position
Sweden (Sverigetopplistan)	44
