= Kikki (album) =

- Album cover

Studio album by Kikki Danielsson
- Released: November 1982
- Recorded: KMH Studios, Stockholm, 1982
- Genre: Country pop
- Label: Mariann Grammofon

Kikki Danielsson chronology
Just Like a Woman (1981)	Kikki (1982)	Varför är kärleken röd? (1983)

Kikki is an eponymous studio album by Kikki Danielsson, released in November 1982. The album peaked at 19th position on the Swedish Albums Chart. In July 2009, the album was digitally released on iTunes.

== Track listing ==
=== Side A ===
#	Title	Songwriter	Length
1.	"Minnet (Memory)"	Andrew Lloyd Webber, Olle Bergman	4.36
2.	"Det finns ingen som vet (The Only Way out)"	R. Martinez, Lasse Holm	3.00
3.	"Baby (Lady) Lay Down"	Don Cook, Rafe Van Hoy	3.10
4.	"Diggy Diggy Lo"	Jon Dolores Miller, Thomas Minor	2.26
5.	"Texas (When I Die)"	Bobby Borchers, Ed Bruce, Patsy Bruce	3.26
6.	"Amazing Grace"	John Newton	5.16

=== Side B ===
#	Title	Songwriter	Length
7.	"Ensamma dagar"	Lasse Holm	4.23
8.	"Some Old California Memory"	Arthur Leo Owens, Warren Robb	3.00
9.	"Every Face Tells a Story"	Michael Allison, Don Black, Peter Sills	3.43
10.	"Rock'n'roll, du fick de bästa åren av mitt liv (Rock'n'Roll, I Gave You the Best Years of My Life)"	Kevin Johnson, Ingela Forsman	3.43
11.	"Stagger Lee"	Harold Logan, Lloyd Price	3.02
12.	"I'm Not Ready (to Fall in Love)"	Lasse Holm	3.12

== Charts ==
Chart (1981–1982)	Peak position
Swedish Albums (Sverigetopplistan)	19
