= Jannez =

- Origin: Laxsjö, Sweden
- Genres: Dansband music
- Years active: 1976-Current

Jannez is a dansband from Laxsjö, Sweden, established in 1976 as Stars orkester.

In September 1996, the band scored a Svensktoppen hit for two weeks with the song De blindas café.

Jannez participated at Dansbandskampen 2008, performing Paul Paljett's 1977 song Guenerina.

== Discography ==
=== Albums ===
- 1989: Härliga tider - strålande tider!
- 1994: Någonstans i mitt hjärta
- 2001: Någonsdans i Sverige
- 2009: Guenerina
- 2010: Se på oss nu
- 2011: É skiiv ma bäre gammaldans...
- 2014: Blixt från klablå himmel

== Svensktoppen songs ==
- "De blindas café" - 1996
