= When It's Lamp Lighting Time in the Valley =

Song by The Vagabonds
- Language: English
- Released: 1933
- Genre: Country
- Songwriter(s): The Vagabonds: Herald Goodman, Curt Poulton, Dean Upson; with Joe Lyons, and Sam C. Hart

When It's Lamp Lighting Time in the Valley is a 1933 country ballad to a waltz melody with words and music by Joe Lyons, Sam C. Hart and The Vagabonds, Curt Poulton, Herald Goodman, and Dean Upson. The song was a hit by The Vagabonds. The song lyrics are about one who longs for his mother, who is far away in a valley. Marty Robbins later covered the song. Other singers who has recorded the song include Tex Ritter and Wayne King.

In 1936, Larry Vincent and Harry Pease released a song with the same melody titled "When the Sun Says Goodnight to the Mountain". This song was later translated into French and became popular in Canada as "Quand le soleil dit bonjour aux montanges", and a bilingual cover by Lucille Starr became an international hit and Canada's first single to sell more than a million copies.

== A Christmas Song ==
When Nils Hellström wrote lyrics in Swedish in 1935, its lyrics were changed and the song was turned into a Christmas song: "När ljusen tändas där hemma". The lamp in the lyrics in English was replaced by candles. "När ljusen tändas därhemma" ("When the candles at home are lit)", which describes an old/lonely man/woman sitting, when the darkness of the evening arrives, and dreaming of his/her childhood and old home, became a popular Christmas song in Sweden during the 1930s and 1940s. It's not mentioned in the song lyrics, but many people associate the song with the emigration from Sweden to the United States during the 19th century and the first half of the 20th century and Sweden being the state where the childhood and home is. The word Christmas is never mentioned in the song lyrics, but the word "ljus", which is Swedish for light/candle, is strongly associated with Advent and Christmas in Sweden. The opening words of the first verse, "Var gång skymningen stilla sig sänker" ("Every time when the dusk slowly falls") often refers to December as the darkest month of the year on the Northern Hemisphere. In English, the song has 4 verses, and 2 in Swedish. The song has also got lyrics in Norwegian, as "Når lysene tennes der hjemme" (meaning the same as in Swedish) and Finnish, as "Kodin kynttilät" (Candles of the Home). The song became immensely popular in Finland during the Winter War, as the Finnish lyrics can be interpreted as a soldier's longing to home and his loved ones. The song has also been translated into other languages, with other themes.

When the Swedish "dansband", pop and country singer Kikki Danielsson covered the Swedish language version of the song on her 1987 Christmas album "Min barndoms jular", the lyrics was changed a little, and she sang about being "lonely" instead of "old". The second verse opening lyrics "Jag är gammal och sitter och drömmer om min barndom som snabbt rann förbi" ("I am old and sit and dream of my childhood, which fast passed") was replaced with the re-written lyrics "Jag är ensam och sitter och drömmer om min barndom som snabbt rann förbi" ("I am lonely and sit and dream of my childhood, which fast passed"). Swedish dansband Sten & Stanley has also recorded this song with "ensam" lyrics version.

== Johnny Reimar version ==
Johnny Reimar from Denmark performed the song as an uptempo song with the title "Når jeg tænker på lille Alvilde" (When I think of little Alvilde). A song about a man who misses his first love.
