= Let's Talk it over in the Ladies Room =

Single by Curtie and the Boombox
- A-side: "Let's Talk it over in the Ladies Room"
- B-side: "Disco Bamba"
- Released: 1984
- Genre: pop
- Label: Chrysalis
- Songwriter(s): Peter Koelewijn

"Let's Talk it over in the Ladies Room" is a song written by Peter Koelewijn, which became a 1984 Curtie and the Boombox hit.

Kikki Danielsson recorded the song with lyrics in Swedish by Ingela "Pling" Forsman, as "Vi låser dörren in till damernas", for the 1985 album Bra vibrationer. and as the song became considered a Kikki Danielsson song in Sweden, it was recorded by Lars Vegas trio on their 1993 EP Kikki Resque.

== Charts ==
Chart (1984)	Peak position
Netherlands (Megacharts)	29
