= Första dagen på resten av mitt liv =

Studio album by Kikki Danielsson
- Released: April 13, 2011
- Recorded: 2011
- Genre: Country, country pop, rock, country rock
- Length: 44:36
- Label: Columbia; Sony Music Entertainment Sweden
- Producer: Henrik Widén

Kikki Danielsson chronology
Upp till dans (2009, Expressen) (2009)	Första dagen på resten av mitt liv (2011)	Postcard from a Painted Lady (2015)

Första dagen på resten av mitt liv (English: "First day of the rest of my life") is a 2011 studio album by Swedish singer Kikki Danielsson. Although Danielson continued recording studio albums with Roosarna during the 1990s, the album was the first released in her own name since 1993.

The album peaked at number three on the Swedish Albums Chart during the first week of its release. In May 2011, the song "Wagon Wheels" received a Svensktoppen test, but failed to chart.

== Track listing ==
#	Title	Songwriter	Length
1.	"Wagon Wheels"	Sulo	03.02
2.	"Låt min starka låga brinna"	Sulo, Kikki Danielsson	03.05
3.	"Första dagen på resten av mitt liv"	Sulo	02.40
4.	"Wine and Roses"	Sulo	03.42
5.	"Varje sång har ett slut"	Sulo, Kikki Danielsson	03.04
6.	"Maybe I'll Do" (duet with Sulo)	Sulo	03.55
7.	"Att få älska och bli älskad igen"	Sulo	02.57
8.	"Inga lösa skott"	Sulo	02.58
9.	"Jag trodde änglarna fanns" (duet with Per Persson)	William Kristoffersen	03.33
10.	"To Know Him is to Love Him"	Phil Spector	02.57
11.	"Backstreets of My Heart"	Sulo	03.16
12.	"En dans; en kyss"	Nisse Hellberg	02.31
13.	"Ringarna på vattnet"	Sulo	03.47
14.	"Let This Light Shine on Forever"	Sulo	03.07

== Musicians ==
- Kikki Danielsson – vocals
- Mats Persson – drums (1, 11), background singing (1, 11), percussion (1, 11)
- Per Björling – bass (1), background singing (1, 11)
- Peder af Ugglas – Electric guitar (1, 11), munspel (1), background singing (1) slide guitar (11)
- Mats Ronander – Electric guitar (1, 11), munspel (1, 11), background singing (1)
- Sulo – Guitar (1, 2, 3, 7, 14), vocals (6)
- Pär Engman – Mandolin (1, 2, 5, 7, 11), background singing (1, 2, 3, 4, 5, 6, 7, 9, 10, 11, 12), guitar (3, 4, 10, 11, 12), electric guitar (4), banjo (7)
- Nico Röhlke – Mandolin (6)
- Mats Gunnarsson – Saxophone (1, 5, 8, 9, 12), clarinet (10)
- Magnus Jonsson – Trumpet (1, 5, 9, 12), flugelhorn (10)
- Ulrika Beijer – background singing (1, 3, 6, 7, 8, 9, 11, 12), guitar (3, 5)
- Johan Dereborn – background singing (1, 2, 3, 4, 6, 8, 9, 11, 12), bass (2, 4, 8, 9), electric guitar (3, 4, 5, 8), background singing (9, 11)
- Henrik Widén – keyboard (1, 3, 4, 5, 6, 7, 8, 9, 10, 11, 12, 14), percussion (1, 2, 3, 4, 5, 6, 7, 8, 9, 10, 11, 12, 14), drums (2), accordion (2, 8, 14), background singing (3, 8)
- Magnus Eriksson – drums (2, 3, 14)
- Fredrik Fagerlund – Electric guitar (2, 3, 6, 14)
- Anders Lundström – Dobro (2, 3), background singing (6, 14), accordion (6)
- Peppe Lindholm – drums (4, 9, 12)
- Lars Karlsson – Guitar (4, 5, 7, 8), electric guitar (8, 9, 12)
- Petter Diamant – drums (5, 7, 8)
- Rasmus Diamant – bass (5)
- Robert Damberg – violin (5)
- Johannes Nordell – drums (6), bass (7), electric guitar (7), background singing (7)
- Martin Tronsson – bass (6, 14)
- Per Persson – vocals (9)
- Pelle Karlsson – bass (12), electric guitar (12)
- Mia Bendes – background singing (14)

=== Others ===
- Producer - Henrik Widén
- Sound engineer - Johan Dereborn
- Mixing - Henrik Widén & Johan Dereborn
- Mastering - Mats Lindfors
- Photo - Emma Svensson
- Cover - Zion Graphics
- Production coordinator - Lasse Höglund

== Charts ==
Chart (2011)	Peak position
Sweden (Sverigetopplistan)	3
