= Säg inte nej, säg kanske =

Song by Sven-Ingvars
- Language: Swedish
- Genre: schlager
- Songwriter: Ingvar Hellberg

"Säg inte nej, säg kanske" is a song written by Ingvar Hellberg and recorded by Sven-Ingvars.

The song charted at Svensktoppen for 16 weeks between 5 February-21 May 1966, topping the chart. In 1967 it was released on an Anders Dahls orkester EP record.

In 2007, the song was recorded by Leif Hagbergs on their album Låtar vi minns, 6.

The song was performed at Dansbandskampen 2008 by Bengt Hennings, who also recorded it for their 2009 album Låt kärleken slå till . At Dansbandskampen 2010, it was performed by Willez.

At Så mycket bättre 2017 the song was performed by Uno Svenningsson.

== Charts ==
Chart (1966)	Peak position
Norway (VG-lista)	2
