= Hem till Norden =

Studio album by Kikki Danielsson & Roosarna
- Released: 1996
- Genre: Country, Dansband music

Kikki Danielsson & Roosarna chronology
Vet du vad jag vet (1994)	Hem till Norden (1996)	Ett hus med många rum (1997)

Hem till Norden ("Home to the Nordics") is a 1996 studio album from Kikki Danielsson & Roosarna. It was nominated for a Grammis in 1996

== Track listing ==
#	Title	Songwriter	Length	Lead vocals
1.	"All min kärlek"	Carl-Henry Kindbom, Carl Lösnitz	3:15	Kikki Danielsson
2.	"En skimrande minut"	Tommy Gunnarsson, Elisabeth Lord	3:13	Kikki Danielsson
3.	"Ingenting är längre som förut"	Lasse Holm, Kaj Svenling	3:01	Kikki Danielsson
4.	"Sången från bergen"	Johnny Thunqvist, Kaj Svenling	3:23	Kikki Danielsson
5.	"Då räknar jag till hundra"	Tim Norell, Ola Håkansson och Alexander Bard	3:32	Kikki Danielsson
6.	"Bara du älskar mig"	Michael Saxell	3:00	Kikki Danielsson
7.	"Beautiful Sunday"	Daniel Boone, Rod McQueen	3:06	Kjell Roos
8.	"Du är Solen i mitt liv"	Lasse Holm, Gert Lengstrand	3:34	Kikki Danielsson
9.	"Hem till Norden"	Tommy Andersson, Kaj Svenling	3:01	Kikki Danielsson
10.	"Ung, blåögd och blyg"	Lasse Holm	3:10	Kikki Danielsson
11.	"Du och jag"	Leif Åhman, G. Johansson	3:34	Kikki Danielsson & Kjell Roos
12.	"I mitt hjärta"	Lotta Ahlin, Tommy Lydell	3:09	Kikki Danielsson
13.	"När du kommer hem"	Mikael Wendt, Christer Lundh	2:58	Kikki Danielsson
14.	"Så länge mitt hjärta kan slå"	Michael Saxell	4:03	Kikki Danielsson
15.	"Ett vänligt ord"	Michael Saxell	3:09	Kikki Danielsson
16.	"A Way with a Broken Heart"	Patty Way, Mike Lawler, Michael Saxell	2.54	Kikki Danielsson
