= Singles Bar =

- Album cover

Studio album by Kikki Danielsson
- Released: November 1983
- Recorded: Glenstudio, Stocksund, October 1983
- Genre: Country pop
- Label: Mariann Records

Kikki Danielsson chronology
Varför är kärleken röd? (1983)	Singles Bar (1983)	Midnight Sunshine (1984)

Singles Bar is a studio album from Kikki Danielsson, released in November 1983. On the album charts, the album peaked at number 13 in Norway and number 35 in Sweden. In July 2009 the album was digitally released to iTunes.

== Track listing ==
=== Side A ===
#	Title	Songwriter	Length
1.	"Comment ça va"	Eddy de Heer, Ralph Peeker	3.48
2.	"Ju mer jag ser"	Anders Glenmark, Ingela Forsman	3.40
3.	"Walk on by"	Kendall Hayes	2.34
4.	"I o u"	Kerry Chater	2.56
5.	"Mina minnen lever än"	Anders Glenmark, Kikki Danielsson	3.48
6.	"I've Got a Heaven"	Kikki Danielsson, Lasse Holm	4.14

=== Side B ===
#	Title	Songwriter	Length
7.	"Singles Bar"	Anders Glenmark, Thomas Minor	3.04
8.	"Öar i ett hav (Islands in the Stream)"	Barry Gibb, Maurice Gibb, Robin Gibb, Ingela "Pling" Forsman	3.38
9.	"Louise (Louise)"	Ian Gomm, Bror Leijon	3.10
10.	"När tåget kommer"	Ingela Forsman, Anders Glenmark	3.48
11.	"Jag har sett himmelen (I've Never Been to Me)"	Ken Hirsch, Ron Miller	3.46
12.	"Take Me to the Pilot"	Elton John	3.08

== Facts ==
- Produced and arranged by Anders Glenmark
- Recorded in "Glenstudio", Stocksund, Sweden, October 1983
- Technician: Claes-Göran Persson

== Contributing musicians ==
- Song, Kikki Danielsson
- drums and percussion: Magnus Persson
- Keyboards: Kjell Öhman
- Bass - Rutger Gunnarsson and Mats Englund
- Electric guitar - Henrik Jansson and Hasse Rosén
- Steel guitar - Mats Rosén
- Trumpet - Urban Agnes and Leif Lindvall
- Trombone - Nisse Landgren
- Saxophone - Glen Myerscough
- Choir - Karin Glenmark, Anders Glenmark and Lennart Sjöholm
- Strings - led by Anders Dahl

== Charts ==
Chart (1983–1984)	Peak position
Swedish Albums (Sverigetopplistan)	35
