= David Johnson (dancer) =

American dancer

- Born: June 12, 1961
- Died: April 23, 2016 (aged 54)
- Occupation: Dancer
- Website: http://www.crazyfeetab.com/

David Johnson (June 12, 1961 – April 23, 2016) was a dancer who has performed in many TV broadcasts in Scandinavia, sometimes with his sister Mary Ostlund (nee Johnson).

He was later an instructor, production artist and organizer, businessman and entrepreneur.

== Biography ==
Johnson was born in California and graduated Fillmore High, class of '79, in Fillmore, California. He later moved to Lund, Sweden in 1981 where he then lived.

Johnson died of cancer in Lake Havasu City, Arizona.

== Selected notable performances ==
- Kikki Danielsson - "Bra vibrationer" (Melodifestivalen 1985 and Eurovision Song Contest 1985)
- Dan Tillberg - "Ta min hand" (Melodifestivalen 1985)
- Lise Haavik - "Du er fuld af løgn" (Eurovision Song Contest 1986)
