= Har du glömt? (album) =

Studio album by Wizex
- Released: September 1976
- Studio: Starec Studios
- Genre: Dansband
- Label: Starec/CBS
- Producer: Wizex

Wizex chronology
Rusar vidare (1975)	Har du glömt? (1976)	Som en sång (1977)

Har du glömt? is a 1976 studio album by the Swedish "dansband" Wizex. It peaked at number 30 on the Swedish Albums Chart. The track "Cowboy Yodel Song" became a minor breakthrough for the group's singer Kikki Danielsson.

== Track listing ==
=== Side 1 ===
#	Title	Songwriter	Length
1.	"Har du glömt?"	Jan Askelind, Conny Modig	2:40
2.	"Love Hurts"	Boudleaux Bryant	3:56
3.	"Nu vet jag vad kärlek är (If You Love Me (Let Me Know)"	John Rostill, Lasse Green	2:41
4.	"En sommardag försvinner"	Lars Hagelin, Tommy Stjernfeldt	2:35
5.	"Jag måste gå (Nobody Wins)"	Kris Kristofferson, Kikki Danielsson	2:42
6.	"I'm on Fire"	Tony Eyers	2:50

=== Side 2 ===
#	Title	Songwriter	Length
7.	"Cowboy Yodel Song"	Carson Robison	1:59
8.	"Kär på lek (Un ange)"	Jean Renard, Stikkan Anderson	2:33
9.	"Låt din kärlek flöda (Let Your Love Flow)"	Larry Williams, Åke Strömmer	2:54
10.	"Stand by Your Man"	Billy Sherrill, Tammy Wynette	2:45
11.	"Åh, Marie"	Lars Hagelin, Tommy Stjernfeldt	2:08
12.	"Alla vägar bär till dig (Every Road Leads Back to You)"	Barry Mason, Keith Potger, L. Schulman	3:16

== Charts ==
Chart (1976)	Peak position
Sweden (Sverigetopplistan)	30
