= In Country (album) =

Compilation album by Kikki Danielsson
- Released: 1992
- Recorded: 1992
- Genre: Country
- Length: 40 minutes
- Label: KM Records

Kikki Danielsson chronology
Vägen hem till dej (1991)	In Country (1992)	Jag ska aldrig lämna dig (1993)

In Country is a 1992 compilation album from Swedish pop and country singer Kikki Danielsson.

== Track listing ==
1. "Listen to a Country Song"
2. "Talking in Your Sleep"
3. "Walk on By"
4. "Stand by Your Man"
5. "Sweet Little You"
6. Nine to Five (9 to 5)
7. "U.S. of America"
8. "Cowboy Yodel Song"
9. "Diggy Diggy Lo"
10. "Good Year for the Roses"
11. Good Year for the Roses
12. Stagger Lee
13. Texas when I Die
14. Take Me to the Pilot
15. "Nashville, Tennessee"

== Contributing musicians ==
- vocals, Kikki Danielsson
- Kjell Öhman, piano
- Rutger Gunnarsson, bass
- Roger Palm, Ola Brunkert, drums
- Hasse Rosén, guitar, dobro
