= I mitt hjärta =

Compilation album by Kikki Danielsson
- Released: Norway 1999, Sweden 2002
- Genre: Dansband music

Kikki Danielsson chronology
Långt bortom bergen (1997)	I mitt hjärta (1999)	100% Kikki (2001)

I mitt hjärta is a compilation album from Kikki Danielsson, released in Norway in 1999 and in Sweden in 2002. Twelve of the songs were recorded with Roosarna between 1994 and 1997. The album also contains two tracks which were new back then, and "Jag trodde änglarna fanns" on the album was sung together with Norwegian dansband Ole Ivars, whose songwriter, bassist and second vocalist, William Kristoffersen, wrote the tracks.

== Track listing ==
1. "I mitt hjärta brinner lågan" - 3.22 (duet: Kikki Danielsson-Tore Halvorsen)
2. "All min kärlek" - 3:15
3. "Har du glömt" - 2:45
4. "I morgondagens ljus" - 3:19
5. "Ung, blåögd och blyg" - 3:10
6. "Jag trodde änglarna fanns" - 3:18 (duet: Kikki Danielsson-Tore Halvorsen)
7. "Ta en dag i taget" - 2:46
8. "Ett vänligt ord" - 3:09
9. "Jag älskar dig" - 3:12
10. "Den enda sanna mannen" - 2:30
11. "Dagar som kommer och går" - 3:30
12. "Min egen väg" - 3:20
13. "Et hus med många rum" - 3:07
14. "Tjejer" - 3:10
