= Jag önskar er alla en riktigt god jul =

Christmas song written by Paul Sahlin

Song by Paul Sahlin

from the album Jultoppar
- Language: Swedish
- Released: 1975
- Genre: Christmas, dansband music
- Songwriters: Paul Sahlin, Torgny Söderberg

"Jag önskar er alla en riktigt god jul" is a Christmas song, written by Paul Sahlin and Torgny Söderberg.

The song was originally recorded by Paul Sahlin, appearing on the 1975 Christmas compilation album Jultoppar.

The song was also recorded by Kikki Danielsson on her 1987 Christmas album Min barndoms jular, and in 1995 the song was recorded by Ann-Cathrine Wiklander.

In 1998 the song was recorded by Matz Bladhs, where Paul Sahlin at the time was the singer.

The song lyrics look back upon school with nostalgia, wishing the old classmates a "Merry Christmas".
