= Hosianna, Davids son =

Advent song with music by Abbé Vogler

- Hymn
- Occasion: Advent
- Language: Swedish
- Melody: by Abbé Vogler
- Composed: 1795
- Published: 1867

Hosianna, Davids son is an Advent song with music by Abbé Vogler (circa 1795) for mixed choir and church organ, with lyrics in Swedish. It is one of the more popular Christmas songs in Sweden and Finland.

== Publication ==
- J. A. Josephson: Zion 1867
- Suomalainen lauluseppele 1871
- Stockholms söndagsskolförenings sångbok 1882 en vers, as number 31 under the lines "Lofsånger".
- Hjärtesånger 1895 as number 41 under the lines "Adventssånger".
- Svensk söndagsskolsångbok 1908 as number 17 under the lines "Adventssånger".
- Lilla Psalmisten 1909 en vers as number 15 under the lines "Kristus: Hans födelse, död och uppståndelse".
- Svenska Missionsförbundets sångbok 1920 as number 73 under the lines "Jesu födelse".
- Svenska Frälsningsarméns sångbok 1922 as number 23 under the lines "Högtider, Advent".
- Kyrklig sång 1928 as number 64.
- Svensk söndagsskolsångbok 1929 as number 32.
- Frälsningsarméns sångbok 1929 as number 538 under the lines "Högtider och särskilda tillfällen - Jul".
- Musik till Frälsningsarméns sångbok 1930 as number 538.
- Sionstoner 1935 as number 145 under the lines "Advent".
- Guds lov 1935 as number 20 under the lines "Advents- och julsånger".
- Nu ska vi sjunga, 1943, under the lines "Andra vackra sånger och visor".
- Sions Sånger 1951 as number 72.
- Förbundstoner 1957 as number 32 "Guds uppenbarelse i Kristus: Advent".
- Kyrkovisor 1960 as number 715 under the lines "Advent".
- Frälsningsarméns sångbok 1968 as number 583 under the lines "Högtider - Advent".
- Sions Sånger 1981 as number 178 under the lines "Tack och lov".
- Levande sång 1984 (tillägg till Segertoner) som nummer 631 under the lines "Advent"
- 1986 as number 105 under the lines "Advent".
- Finlandssvenska psalmboken 1986 as number 1 under the lines "Advent".
- Finska psalmboken 1986 as number 1 under the lines "Advent".
- Psalmer och Sånger 1987 as number 487 under the lines "Advent".
- Lova Herren 1988 as number 92 under the lines "Advent".
- Barnens svenska sångbok, 1999, under the lines "Året runt".

== Recordings ==
An early recording was done by Solistkvintetten in Stockholm in October 1908. Kikki Danielsson recorded the song on her 1987 Christmas album Min barndoms jular.
