= Postcard from a Painted Lady =

Studio album by Kikki Danielsson
- Released: 25 September 2015
- Studio: Gothenburg Radiophonic Workshop
- Genre: Country
- Length: 37 minutes
- Label: Capitol

Kikki Danielsson chronology
| Första dagen på resten av mitt liv (2011) | Postcard from a Painted Lady (2015) | Christmas Card from a Painted Lady (2016) |

Postcard from a Painted Lady is a studio album by Kikki Danielsson, released on 25 September 2015.

== Professional reviews ==
Aftonbladet's Håkan Steen gave the album three stars out of five possible.

== Track listing ==
| No. | Title | Writer(s) | Length |
|---|---|---|---|
| 1. | "Sideways in the Driving Rain" | Sören Karlsson |
| 2. | "Country Fable" | Sören Karlsson |
| 3. | "Good Life" | Sören Karlsson |
| 4. | "Postcard from a Painted Lady" | Sören Karlsson |
| 5. | "Brimstone Heart" | Sören Karlsson |
| 6. | "Not About Me Anymore" | Sören Karlsson, Gunnar Frick |
| 7. | "24-7" | Sören Karlsson, Idde Schultz |
| 8. | "Hard Country" | Sören Karlsson |
| 9. | "The Bravest Song" | Sören Karlsson |
| 10. | "Comfort Me" | Sören Karlsson |
| 11. | "Be the One" | Sören Karlsson |
| 12. | "Stay Away from the Blue Bayou" | Sören Karlsson |

== Contributors ==
- Kikki Danielsson - vocals
- Stefan Bellnäs - bass, dobro, doublebass
- Johan Håkansson - drums, percussion
- Gunnar Frick - piano, organ, pedal steel, guitar, accordion
- Pär Öjerot - guitar, mandolin, banjo, mandola
- Henrik Cederblom - violin
- Sören Karlsson - producer

== Charts ==
| Chart (2015) | Peak position |
|---|---|
| Sweden (Sverigetopplistan) | 5 |
