= Det måste gå att dansa till =

Studio album by Larz-Kristerz
- Released: 26 June 2013
- Genre: Dansband music
- Length: 49 minutes
- Label: Sony Music
- Producer: Figge Boström

Larz-Kristerz chronology
Från Älvdalen till Nashville (2011)	Det måste gå att dansa till (2013)	40 mil från Stureplan (2014)

Det måste gå att dansa till is a studio album by Swedish dansband Larz-Kristerz, released on 26 June 2013.

== Track listing ==
1. "Det måste gå att dansa till"
2. "Rose-Marie"
3. "Har du glömt"
4. "Lycka till"
5. "Midsommarnatt"
6. "Var är du nu, Marianne"
7. "Varför vänder du dig om"
8. "Har du kanske väntat på mig"
9. "Berg och dalar"
10. "Skyll på lantbrevbärarens moped"
11. "409"
12. "Annelie"
13. "Trolleri"
14. "Nu har det hänt igen"
15. "Förlåt"

== Charts ==
=== Weekly charts ===
Chart (2013)	Peak position
Swedish Albums (Sverigetopplistan)	2

=== Year-end charts ===
Chart (2013)	Position
Swedish Albums (Sverigetopplistan)	15

== Certifications ==
Region	Certification	Certified units/sales
Sweden (GLF)	Gold	20,000^{‡}
^{‡} Sales+streaming figures based on certification alone.
