= Portrait of a Painted Lady =

Studio album by Kikki Danielsson
- Released: 22 September 2017
- Genre: Country
- Label: Capitol/Universal

Kikki Danielsson chronology
Christmas Card from a Painted Lady (2016)	Portrait of a Painted Lady (2017)	Miss Decibel (2021)

Portrait of a Painted Lady is a studio album by Kikki Danielsson, released on 22 September 2017.

== Professional reviews ==
Aftonbladet's Per Magnusson gave the album three stars out of five possible.

== Tracklisting ==
No.	Title	Writer(s)	Length
1.	"Heartaches and Hurricanes"
2.	"Headline Queen"
3.	"Someone to Drive Me Home"
4.	"I'll Take Anything Now"
5.	"One Cross, Too Many"
6.	"Time to Remember, Time to Forget"
7.	"Never Left the Country"
8.	"My River is Dry"
9.	"Not Exactly Nashville"
10.	"Fade to Blue"
11.	"Going South From Here"
12.	"You're a Miracle To Me"
13.	"Final Whistle"
14.	"The Ballad of Lucy Jordan"	Shel Silverstein

== Chart positions ==
Chart (2017)	Peak position
Sweden (Sverigetopplistan)	27
