= Jag ska aldrig lämna dig =

Studio album by Kikki Danielsson
- Released: 1993
- Recorded: 1993
- Genre: Country pop
- Length: 43 minutes
- Label: Mill Records

Kikki Danielsson chronology
In Country (1992)	Jag ska aldrig lämna dig (1993)	På begäran 2 (1994)

Jag ska aldrig lämna dig is a 1993 studio album from Swedish country and pop singer Kikki Danielsson. The songwriters Mikael Wendt and Christer Lundh had travelled to India to get inspiration for the record.

== Track listing ==
#	Title	Songwriter	Length
1.	"Caribian Life"	Mikael Wendt, Christer Lundh	?
2.	"Någon däruppe"	Michael Saxell	?
3.	"Vad som än händer"	Mikael Wendt, Christer Lundh	?
4.	"Jag ska aldrig lämna dig"	Mikael Wendt, Christer Lundh	?
5.	"Som en sol"	Mikael Wendt, Christer Lundh	?
6.	"Det finns ingen annan än du (Nobody's Baby)"	Torgny Söderberg, Lasse Holm, Kikki Danielsson	?
7.	"Don't Forget to Remember"	Barry Gibb, Maurice Gibb	?
8.	"Blå vackra ögon"	Mikael Wendt, Christer Lundh	?
9.	"En cowboy från Oklahoma (That's all I've Got)"	Roni Kamras, Mikael Wendt, Christer Lundh	?
10.	"Så håll om mig"	Mikael Wendt, Christer Lundh	?
11	"En allra sista chans (Achy Breaky Heart)"	Don von Tress, Mikael Wendt, Christer Lundh	?
12.	"Här med dig"	Mikael Wendt, Christer Lundh	?
13.	"Det bästa i mitt liv"	Mona Gustafsson	?
14.	"Gyllene tider (Blame it on Texas)"	Ronnie Rogers, Mikael Wendt, Christer Lundh	?

== Contributing musicians ==
- Kikki Danielsson, vocals
- Lasse Wellander, guitar
- Peter Ljung, keyboard
- Rutger Gunnarsson, bass
- Klas Anderhell, percussion, drums
- Hasse Rosén, guitar, banjo

== Svensktoppen ==
- The ballad Som en sol from the album charted on Svensktoppen for seven weeks during the period August 28-October 9, 1993, where it peaked at #7.
- The song Jag ska aldrig lämna dig charted on Svensktoppen for four weeks during the period June 4–25, 1994, where it peaked at #4.
