= Sjötofta =

Village in Västergötland, Sweden

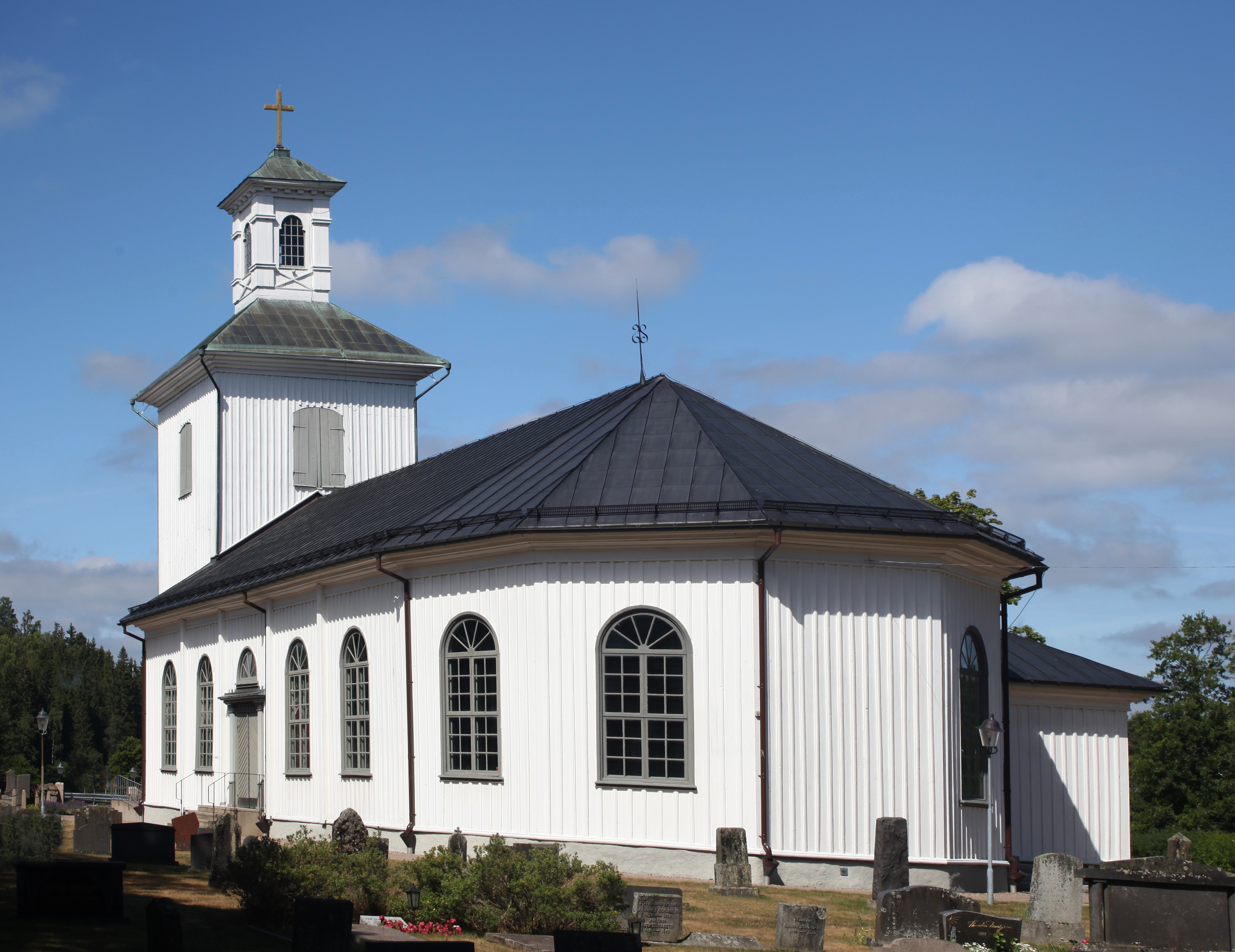
- Sjötofta church (2018)

- Location within Västra Götaland Location within Sweden
- Coordinates: 57°21′N 13°17′E
- Country: Sweden
- Province: Västergötland
- County: Västra Götaland County
- Municipality: Tranemo Municipality

Area
  - Total: 0.65 km^{2} (0.25 sq mi)

Population (2005-12-31)
  - Total: 208
  - Density: 319/km^{2} (830/sq mi)
- Time zone: UTC+1 (CET)
  - Summer (DST): UTC+2 (CEST)

Sjötofta is a village situated in Tranemo Municipality, Västra Götaland County, Sweden with 208 inhabitants in 2005.
