= En enda gång (song) =

1992 Kikki Danielsson song

Single by Kikki Danielsson

from the album En enda gång
- A-side: "En enda gång"
- B-side: "En enda gång" (karaoke version)
- Released: 1992
- Genre: Schlager
- Songwriters: Hans Skoog; Martin Klaman

Kikki Danielsson singles chronology
"Julen är härlig" (1990)	"En enda gång" (1992)	"Som en sol" (1993)

"En enda gång", lyrics by Hans Skoog and music Martin Klaman, is a power ballad which Kikki Danielsson performed when it finished fourth at the Swedish Melodifestivalen 1992. Kikki Danielsson had throat problems, which caused her voice to become more hoarse than usual. However, this didn't seem to affect the result in a negative way, since the song reminded of those heavy mer ballads with hoarse singer remaining popularity at that time.

The lyrics is natural romantic, like many other Kikki Danielssons songs. In "En enda gång", Swedish for "Only one time", the singer describes its love as several natural phenomenas.

== Svensktoppen ==
"En enda gång" stayed on the Swedish chart Svensktoppen for one week, where it was on the 10th place.
