= Vet du vad jag vet? =

Vet du vad jag vet

Studio album by Kikki Danielsson & Roosarna
- Released: 1994
- Genre: Country, Dansband music
- Length: 45 minutes
- Label: BMG Ariola

Kikki Danielsson & Roosarna chronology
En enda gång (1992)	Vet du vad jag vet (1994)	Hem till Norden (1996)

Vet du vad jag vet? is a 1994 studio album from Kikki Danielsson & Roosarna. In 1995 the album was awarded a Grammis for best dansband album of 1994. At Svensktoppen, the songs "Långt bortom bergen" and "Vet du vad jag vet?" managed to enter the chart.

== Track listing ==
#	Title	Songwriter
1.	"Vet du vad jag vet?"	Michael Saxell
2.	"Långt bortom bergen"	Lasse Holm, Gert Lengstrand
3.	"Hela vägen hem"	Staffan Hellstrand
4.	"Har du kommit för att stanna?"	Steven Diamond, Mikael Wendt, Christer Lundh
5.	"I Aint that Lonely Yet"	Kostas, James House
6.	"När du viskar mitt namn"	Michael Saxell
7.	"Jag hör din röst"	Michael Saxell
8.	"Jag älskar hur du älskar mig"	Michael Saxell
9.	"Get to the Church"	Michael Saxell, Jennifer Saxell
10.	"Min bästa vän" ("Heart like a Rodeo")	Michael Saxell, Peter McCann
11.	"Kom tillbaka igen" (Get Him out of Your Mind)"	Lasse Holm, Torgny Söderberg, Kikki Danielsson
12.	"I'm Gonna Knock on Your Door"	Aaron Schroeder, Sid Wayne
13.	"Tillbaks till fantasin"	Michael Saxell
14.	"Vi har hunnit fram till refrängen"	Neil Sedaka, Howard Greenfield, Stikkan Andersson
