= Små ord av guld =

Studio album by Larz-Kristerz
- Released: 25 September 2010
- Recorded: Orsa, Sweden
- Genre: Country, rock
- Length: 46 minutes
- Label: Sony Music

Larz-Kristerz chronology
Om du vill (2009)	Små ord av guld (2010)	Från Älvdalen till Nashville (2011)

Små ord av guld is a studio album by Swedish dansband Larz-Kristerz, released on 25 September 2010. The album was awarded a Guldklaven award in the "Album of the year" category.

== Track listing ==
1. "Är du lika ensam som jag"
2. "Små ord av guld"
3. "Zetorn"
4. "Natten har tusen ögon (Cuando salí de Cuba)"
5. "Gasen i botten"
6. "Life Is Life"
7. "OK nu glömmer jag dig"
8. "Den som älskar"
9. "När sanningen sjunkit in"
10. "Hälsa Marie från mig"
11. "Cruisin' on a Saturday Night"
12. "Jag kan glömma"
13. "Pröva lite kärlek nån gång"
14. "Cool Cat Walk"
15. "Love Me"

== Charts ==
=== Weekly charts ===
Chart (2010–2011)	Peak position
Swedish Albums (Sverigetopplistan)	1

=== Year-end charts ===
Chart (2010)	Position
Swedish Albums (Sverigetopplistan)	11
