= Make me no 1 =

Song performed by Felicia Olsson

Make me no 1 is a song written by Amir Aly, Henrik Wikström, Ingela "Pling" Forsman and Maria Haukaas Mittet. The song is performed by the singer Felicia Olsson and is one of the 32 contributions in the Swedish song contest Melodifestivalen 2013.
