= Hem till dig =

Studio album by Larz-Kristerz
- Released: 18 February 2009
- Recorded: January 2009
- Studio: Studio Orsa, Sweden
- Genre: Dansband music
- Length: 44 minutes
- Label: Sony Music
- Producer: Lars Höglund

Larz-Kristerz chronology
Stuffparty 3 (2007)	Hem till dig (2009)	Om du vill (2009)

Hem till dig is the fourth studio album by Swedish dansband Larz-Kristerz, released on 18 February 2009. For the album, the band was awarded a Grammis award in the "Dansband of the year" category.

== Track listing ==
1. "Carina" – 3:16
2. "Purple Rain" – 2.47
3. "Hem till dig" – 3:33
4. "Sweet Child o' Mine" – 2:43
5. "Regniga natt (Gråtende sky)" – 3:41
6. "I Love Europe" – 3:01
7. "Corrine, Corrina" – 3:16
8. "Visst é dé så" – 3:15
9. "Hold on Tight" – 2:54
10. "Eva (strippan från Trosa)" – 2:37
11. "Yester-Me, Yester-You, Yesterday" – 3:13
12. "We're Not Gonna Take It" – 3:13
13. "Papaya Coconut" – 3:37
14. "Last Date" – 3:18

== Charts ==
=== Weekly charts ===
Chart (2009)	Peak position
Norwegian Albums (VG-lista)	17
Swedish Albums (Sverigetopplistan)	1

=== Year-end charts ===
Chart (2009)	Position
Swedish Albums (Sverigetopplistan)	2
