= 40 mil från Stureplan =

Studio album by Larz-Kristerz
- Released: 5 November 2014
- Studio: Studio Bohus, Kungälv, Sweden
- Genre: Dansband music
- Label: Sony Music
- Producer: Figge Boström

Larz-Kristerz chronology
Det måste gå att dansa till (2013)	40 mil från Stureplan (2014)	Våra bästa! (2015)

40 mil från Stureplan is a studio album by Larz-Kristerz. The release party was held inside Älvdalen's sportshall on 4 November 2014, and the album was released on 6 November 2014.

== Track listing ==
1. "Jag måste glömma Carina"
2. "Torkade rosor och tummade brev"
3. "Kan jag få lov"
4. "Fast i ditt garn igen"
5. "Varför vill du inte ha mig?"
6. "Din för evigt"
7. "Då kommer jag tillbaka"
8. "Fröken rar"
9. "Stoppa i fickan"
10. "Vykort från himlen"
11. "Hej gamla väg"
12. "Kejsarens nya kläder"
13. "Den riktigt sanna kärleken"
14. "Pretend"

== Personnel ==
- Peter Larsson – vocals, guitar
- Trond Korsmoe – bass, choir
- Mikael Eriksson – drums, ocarina
- Torbjörn Eriksson – keyboard, accordion
- Anders Tegnér – electric guitar

== Charts ==
=== Weekly charts ===
Chart (2014)	Peak position
Swedish Albums (Sverigetopplistan)	2

=== Year-end charts ===
Chart (2014)	Position
Swedish Albums (Sverigetopplistan)	43
