= Just Like a Woman (Kikki Danielsson album) =

Studio album by Kikki Danielsson
- Released: March 1981
- Genre: Country; Pop
- Label: Mariann Grammofon AB

Kikki Danielsson chronology
Rock'n Yodel (1979)	Just Like a Woman (1981)	Kikki (1982)

Just Like a Woman is a 1981 studio album from Kikki Danielsson. At the Swedish album chart, the album peaked at 20th position.

The song "Lättare sagt än gjort" charted at Svensktoppen for four weeks between 7 June–20 September 1981 (including the summer break), peaking at fifth position.

== Track listing ==
=== Side A ===
#	Title	Songwriter	Length
1.	"Just Like a Woman"	Lasse Holm	4.06
2.	"Stand by Your Man"	Billy Sherrill, Tammy Wynette	2.36
3.	"Jag är på väg"	Anders Glenmark, Mona Hallberg	4.06
4.	"We're All Alone"	Boz Scaggs	3.53
5.	"I Love a Rainy Night"	David Malloy, Eddie Rabbitt, Even Stevens	3.00
6.	"Fear of Flying"	Charlie Dore	3.17
7.	"Här är jag igen (Here You Come Again)"	Barry Mann, Cynthia Weil, Kikki Danielsson	2.42

=== Side B ===
#	Title	Songwriter	Length
8.	"U.S. of America"	Donna Fargo	3.48
9.	"Lättare sagt än gjort"	Lasse Holm	3.30
10.	"9 to 5"	Dolly Parton	2.43
11.	"Forget Me Not"	Al Byron, Paul Evans	3.28
12.	"Listen to a Country Song"	Al Garth, Jim Messina	2.49
13.	"Blunda och dröm"	Lasse Holm	3.55
14.	"Lost Without Your Love"	Marty Cuppersmith, Gerry Goffin	3.03
15.	"God morgon" (Sweets n' Chips)	Lasse Holm, Torgny Söderberg	3.03

== Charts ==
Chart (1981)	Peak position
Sweden (Sverigetopplistan)	20
