= Christmas Card from a Painted Lady =

Studio album by Kikki Danielsson
- Released: November 4, 2016
- Studio: Kingside Studio
- Length: 41 minutes
- Label: Universal Music
- Producer: Sören Karlsson

Kikki Danielsson chronology
Postcard from a Painted Lady (2015)	Christmas Card from a Painted Lady (2016)	Portrait of a Painted Lady (2017)

Christmas Card from a Painted Lady is a studio album by Kikki Danielsson, released on 4 November 2016. It is a Christmas album.

== Track listing ==
No.	Title	Writer(s)	Length
1.	"Silver Garland"	Sören Karlsson
2.	"Blue Christmas"	Billy Hayes, Jay Johnson
3.	"There Goes My Everything"	Dallas Frazier
4.	"Paper Star"	Sören Karlsson
5.	"Run Rudolph Run"	Marvin Broadie, Johnny Marks
6.	"Silver Bells"	Ray Evans, Jay Livingstone
7.	"Amazing Grace"	Trad.
8.	"Sparkling Winter Night"	Sören Karlsson
9.	"The Greatest Gift of All"	Dottie Peoples
10.	"Go Tell It on the Mountain"	Trad.
11.	"If New Year's Day Wasn't So Cold"	Sören Karlsson
12.	"Silent Night (Stille Nacht, heilige Nacht)"	Franz Gruber

== Contributors ==
- Kikki Danielsson - vocals
- Sören Karlsson - guitar, producer
- Gunnar Frick - piano, organ, accordion, pedal steel guitar
- Stefan Bellnäs - piano, organ, accordion, pedal steel guitar
- Johan Håkansson - drums, percussion
- Staffan Johansson - guitar

== Chart positions ==
Chart (2016)	Peak position
Swedish Albums (Sverigetopplistan)	26
