= Rock'n Yodel =

- Album cover

Studio album by Kikki Danielsson
- Released: April 1979
- Genre: Country pop, Schlager
- Label: Mariann Grammofon
- Producer: Lasse Holm

Kikki Danielsson chronology
Rock'n Yodel (1979)	Just Like a Woman (1981)

Rock'n Yodel is a studio album by Kikki Danielsson, released in April 1979 as her debut album as a solo artist. It peaked at number 13 on the Swedish Albums Chart. The title "Rock'n Yodel", which features Kikki Danielsson yodeling, charted at Svensktoppen for 10 weeks between 13 May–15 July 1979, peaking at 5th position.

== Track listing ==
=== Side A ===
#	Title	Songwriter	Length
1.	"Och vi hörde klockor ringa (Les trois cloches)"	Jean Villard, Britt Lindeborg	4:06
2.	"Talking in Your Sleep"	Roger Cook, Bobby Woods	3:03
3.	"Vad kan jag göra"	Lasse Holm, Britt Lindeborg	3:33
4.	"Letter Sweater"	Lasse Holm, Thomas Minor	2:38
5.	"Please Help Me (I'm Falling)"	Hal Blair, Don Robertson	2:58
6.	"Jag är ditt ljus på mörka vatten (Candle on the Water)"	Joel Hirschhorn, Al Kasha, Doreen Denning	2:40
7.	"Rock'n Roll Music"	Chuck Berry	2:32

=== Side B ===
#	Title	Songwriter	Length
8.	"Rock'n Yodel"	Lasse Holm	2:50
9.	"Que Será, Será"	Ray Evans, Jay Livigston	3:35
10.	"Let's Keep it that Way"	Curly Putman, Rafe Van Hoy	3:50
11.	"Sweet Little You"	Larry Kolber, Barry Mann	2.:00
12.	"Lay Your Love on Me"	Mike Chapman, Nicky Chinn	3:16
13.	"Tänker lära mig leva livet"	Lasse Holm, Britt Lindeborg	3:15
14.	"Springa omkring (Stumblin' in)"	Mike Chapman, Nicky Chinn	3:43

== Charts ==
Chart (1979)	Peak position
Sweden (Sverigetopplistan)	13
