= Curtie and the Boombox =

Dutch pop group

- Origin: Netherlands
- Genre: pop
- Years active: 1984-1986
- Labels: RCA Records, Injection Disco Dance Label
- Past members: Curtie Fortune, Denise van der Hek, Judith Landry, Patricia Balrak

Curtie and the Boombox were a Dutch pop group that scored two successful hits on the Dutch charts during the mid 1980s. Notable songs include "Black Kisses (Never Make You Blue)" and "Let's Talk it over in the Ladies Room". The former of which also made it on the Billboard Hot 100, peaking at No. 81. Both songs were performed by the group on the Dutch television show TopPop with "Black Kisses" being performed two different times.

Lead singer Curtie Fortune, who was born on Carriacou, died in 2003 aged 44.

== Discography ==
=== Albums ===
- Black Kisses - 1985
- Curtie and the Boombox - 1985

=== Singles and EP records ===
- "Let's Talk it over in the Ladies Room" - 1984
- "Black Kisses (Never Make You Blue)" - 1985
- "Chinchilla" - 1985
- "A Bachelor's Bed (Is A Dangerous Place)" - 1985
- "Killing Love" - 1986 (released as by Boom Box)
