= Låt kärleken slå till =

Studio album by Bengt Hennings
- Released: 20 February 2009
- Genre: Dansband music
- Length: 47 minutes
- Label: Warner Music Sweden
- Producer: Martin Lindqvist

Bengt Hennings chronology
Bäst av allt (2007)	Låt kärleken slå till (2009)	Golden Hits (2011)

Låt kärleken slå till is a studio album by Bengt Hennings, released in 2009.

== Track listing ==
1. "Jag trodde änglarna fanns"
2. "Rena rama vilda västern"
3. "Till världens ände"
4. "Carina (Jag måste ringa)"
5. "I Just Wanna Dance With You"
6. "Ovan regnbågen" ("Over the Rainbow")
7. "Säg inte nej, säg kanske"
8. "Glöm ej bort att älska varann"
9. "Muckartwist" (instrumental)
10. "En liten gulnad lapp"
11. "Men så viskade en fågel"
12. "Låt kärleken slå till"
13. "Vi har så mycket att säga varandra"
14. "Aj, aj, aj"
15. "Vår enda sommar"

== Chart positions ==
Chart (2009)	Peak position
Sweden	10
