= På begäran (Kikki Danielsson album) =

Compilation album by Kikki Danielsson
- Released: 1990
- Recorded: 1980–1990
- Genre: Country; Dansband music Pop
- Label: Mariann Grammofon AB

Kikki Danielsson chronology
Canzone d'Amore (1989)	På begäran (1990)	Vägen hem till dej (1991)

På begäran is a 1990 compilation album from Swedish pop and country singer Kikki Danielsson.

== Track listing ==
1. Let Them Walk in the Sunshine
2. En dröm jag vill ha kvar
3. Amazing Grace
4. Ge mig sol, ge mig hav
5. När vi rör varann
6. John & Jill
7. Det finns en sol
8. US of America
9. Vi skall dansa hela natten
10. Minnet
11. Du lovade guld
12. Comment ça va
13. Du lever på drömmar
14. Jag vet vad jag vill
15. Tag en chans
16. Kikki Rap (mixed Kikki Danielssons hits)
  1. Papaya Coconut
  2. Rädda pojkar
  3. Det är nu
  4. Jag är på väg (I'm on My Way)
