= Guenerina =

Single by Paul Sahlin

from the album Mumbo Jumbo
- B-side: "Reggae Bump"
- Released: 1977
- Genre: Dansband; pop
- Label: Mariann
- Songwriters: Paul Sahlin; Monica Forsberg

Paul Sahlin singles chronology
"Bye Bye Carolina" (1977)	"Guenerina" (1977)	"Hurry Up Diana" (1978)

Guenerina is a song written by singers Paul Sahlin and Monica Forsberg. The song stayed at Svensktoppen for 11 weeks from 17 April- 10 July 1977, topping the chart seven times.

The song originally applied for Melodifestivalen 1977, but was rejected.

In 1977 Nils Dacke recorded the song for the album Nils Dacke spelar partyorgel.

In 1978 Vikingarna recorded the song on the album Export, to promote the band outside Sweden, with lyrics in English as Don't Cry in the Sunshine, written by Thomas Minor.

In 1992 the song was also recorded by Matz Bladhs on the album Leende dansmusik 92, when Paul Paljett was the band's lead singer.

In 1997 Ronnix recorded the song for the album Ronnix.

At Dansbandskampen 2008, the song was performed by Jannez. Their recording also became available for the 2008 Dansbandskampen compilation album, and the 2009 Jannez album with the same name.
