= James Cates =

James Cates can refer to:

- James Cates (academic) (born 1956), a psychologist and author
- James Cates (Kansas politician) (born 1944), a member of the Kansas state legislature
