= Från Älvdalen till Nashville =

Studio album by Larz-Kristerz
- Released: 9 November 2011
- Recorded: Mid-2011
- Studio: Orsa, Sweden; Nashville, Tennessee, United States
- Genre: Country, dansband music
- Length: 55 minutes
- Label: Sony Music
- Producer: Chris Antblad, Walt Aldrige

Larz-Kristerz chronology
Små ord av guld (2010)	Från Älvdalen till Nashville (2011)	Det måste gå att dansa till (2013)

Från Älvdalen till Nashville is a studio album by Swedish dansband Larz-Kristerz, released on 9 November 2011. For the album, the band was awarded a Grammis award in the "Dansband of the year" category and a Guldklaven Award in the "Album of the Year" category.

== Track listing ==
1. "Här på landet"
2. "Dance with Somebody"
3. "Hjärtat bankar" (duet with Eva Eastwood)
4. "Vaya con Dios"
5. "Du lovar och du svär"
6. "Lögner och porslin"
7. "I'm Ready"
8. "1000 frågor, ett svar"
9. "Paula (flera tusen watt)"
10. "Highway Patrol"
11. "Vår gamla opel"
12. "Hard Luck Woman"
13. "Du gör mig lycklig"
14. "Optimisten"
15. "Good Hearted Woman"
16. "Du raiter up mig (You Raise Me Up)"

== Charts ==
Chart (2011–2012)	Peak position
Swedish Albums (Sverigetopplistan)	1
