= Om du vill =

Studio album by Larz-Kristerz
- Released: 25 September 2009
- Recorded: Orsa, Sweden
- Genre: Country, dansband music
- Length: 42 minutes
- Label: Sony Music

Larz-Kristerz chronology
Hem till dig (2009)	Om du vill (2009)	Små ord av guld (2010)

Om du vill is a studio album by the Swedish dansband Larz-Kristerz, released on 9 November 2009. For the album, the band was awarded a Grammis award in the "Dansband of the year" category and a Guldklaven Award in the "Album of the Year" category.

== Track listing ==
1. "The Look"
2. "Monte Carlo"
3. "Förr eller senare"
4. "Half a Boy & Half a Man"
5. "Man får leva som man lär"
6. "You Don't Have to Say You Love Me"
7. "Jackson" (duet with Caroline Borg)
8. "Om du vill"
9. "It's Only Rock 'n Roll"
10. "Du e flickan för mig (The Most Beautiful Girl)"
11. "Elenore"
12. "Tårar med smaken av salt"
13. "I Can't Stop Loving You"

== Charts ==
Chart (2009–2010)	Peak position
Swedish Albums (Sverigetopplistan)	1
