= Kikkis 15 bästa låtar =

- Album cover

Compilation album by Kikki Danielsson
- Released: 1984
- Genre: Country pop, dansband
- Label: Mariann Records

Kikki Danielsson chronology
| Midnight Sunshine (1984) | Kikkis 15 bästa låtar (1984) | Bra vibrationer (1985) |

Kikkis 15 bästa låtar is a 1984 compilation album from Swedish pop and country singer Kikki Danielsson. On the compilation, 15 songs recorded by her had been chosen ("Kikkis 15 bästa låtar" is Swedish for "15 best songs of Kikki"). One of the songs, "Gubben i lådan", written by Lasse Holm and Torgny Söderberg, was new and became a hit.

== Track listing ==
=== Side A ===
1. "Gubben i lådan" - 2:45
2. "Stand by Your Man" - 2:36
3. "All Alone Am I (Min ton rotas ton ourano)" - 3:45
4. "Sången skall klinga" - 3:49
5. "Que Sera, Sera" - 3:35
6. "My Broken Souvenirs" - 3:43
7. "Some Old California Memory" - 3:00
8. "Ensamma dagar" - 4:23

=== Side B ===
1. "Storms Never Last" - 3:20 (with Hasse Andersson)
2. "Ljuset i din natt" - 3:53
3. "Just Like a Woman" - 4:06
4. "Talking in Your Sleep" - 3:03
5. "Fais Deaux deaux" - 3:18
6. "Amazing Grace" - 5:16
7. "Letter Sweater" - 2:38
