= Varför är kärleken röd? =

- Album cover

Compilation album by Kikki Danielsson
- Released: April 1983
- Recorded: 1976–1983
- Genre: Country pop, schlager
- Length: 57 minutes
- Label: Mariann Records

Kikki Danielsson chronology
Kikki (1982)	Varför är kärleken röd? (1983)	Singles Bar (1983)

Varför är kärleken röd? is a compilation album by Kikki Danielsson, released in April 1983. The album reached number 29 on the Swedish Albums Chart. The album also contained a new song, the title track "Varför är kärleken röd?". In 1992, it was released to CD as Kikkis 16 bästa låtar (Swedish: for "16 best songs of Kikki").

== Track listing ==
=== Side A ===
1. Varför är kärleken röd? - 3:19
2. Our Love is Over - 4:15
3. Och vi hörde klockor ringa (The Three Bells) - 4:06
4. Can't Get Over You - 3:35
5. Cowboy Yoddle Song - 2:09
6. Nobody's baby but mine - 3:10
7. Minnet (Memory) - 4:36
8. Queen of Hearts - 3:35

=== Side B ===
1. Du skriver dina kärlekssånger - 3:42
2. Starry Night - 4:00
3. Forget Me Not - 3:28
4. Rock 'n'Roll, du fick de bästa åren av mitt liv (Rock'n'Roll, I Gave You the Best Years of My Life) - 3:50
5. Good Year for the Roses - 3:07
6. Listen to a Country Song - 2:49
7. Tänker lära mig livet - 3:35
8. Someone Needs Somebodys Love - 3:40

== Charts ==
Chart (1983)	Peak position
Swedish Albums (Sverigetopplistan)	29
