= Scenen är vår =

Studio album by Bengt Hennings
- Released: May 2012
- Genre: dansband music
- Length: 39 minutes
- Label: Atenzia

Bengt Hennings chronology
Golden Hits (2011)	Scenen är vår (2012)

Scenen är vår is a studio album by the Swedish band Bengt Hennings, released in May 2012.

== Track listing ==
1. "Scenen är vår", with Bengt Henningsson, Hasse Schmidt and Sune strand (Leif Melander, Maritha Johansson)
2. "Jag lever nu" (Anders Wigelius, Ulf Georgsson)
3. "Stanna hos mig i natt" ("Why Don't We Spend the Night", Bob McDill, Hasse Carlsson)
4. "Möt mig i Stockholm" ("Meet Me in Stockholm", Doug Sam, Red Jenkins)
5. "Young and Beautiful" (Aaron Schroeder, Abner Silver)
6. "Kärleken går sin egen väg" (Peter Åhs, Ulf Georgsson)
7. "Pretty Suzie Sunshine" (John L. Finneran, Vincent Finneran)
8. "Only the Lonely" (Joe Melson, Roy Orbison)
9. "Lördagskväll i parken" (Leif Melander, Peter Nord)
10. Bee Gees medley (Barry Gibb, Maurice Gibb, Robin Gibb)
  1. "Islands in the Stream"
  2. "Heartbreaker"
  3. "How Deep Is Your Love"
  4. "More Than a Woman"
11. "Euphoria" (Thomas G:son, Peter Boström)
12. "På en våg av kärlek" (Tommy Andersson, Camilla Andersson)

== Chart positions ==
Chart (2012–2013)	Peak position
Sweden	8
