= Tranemo =

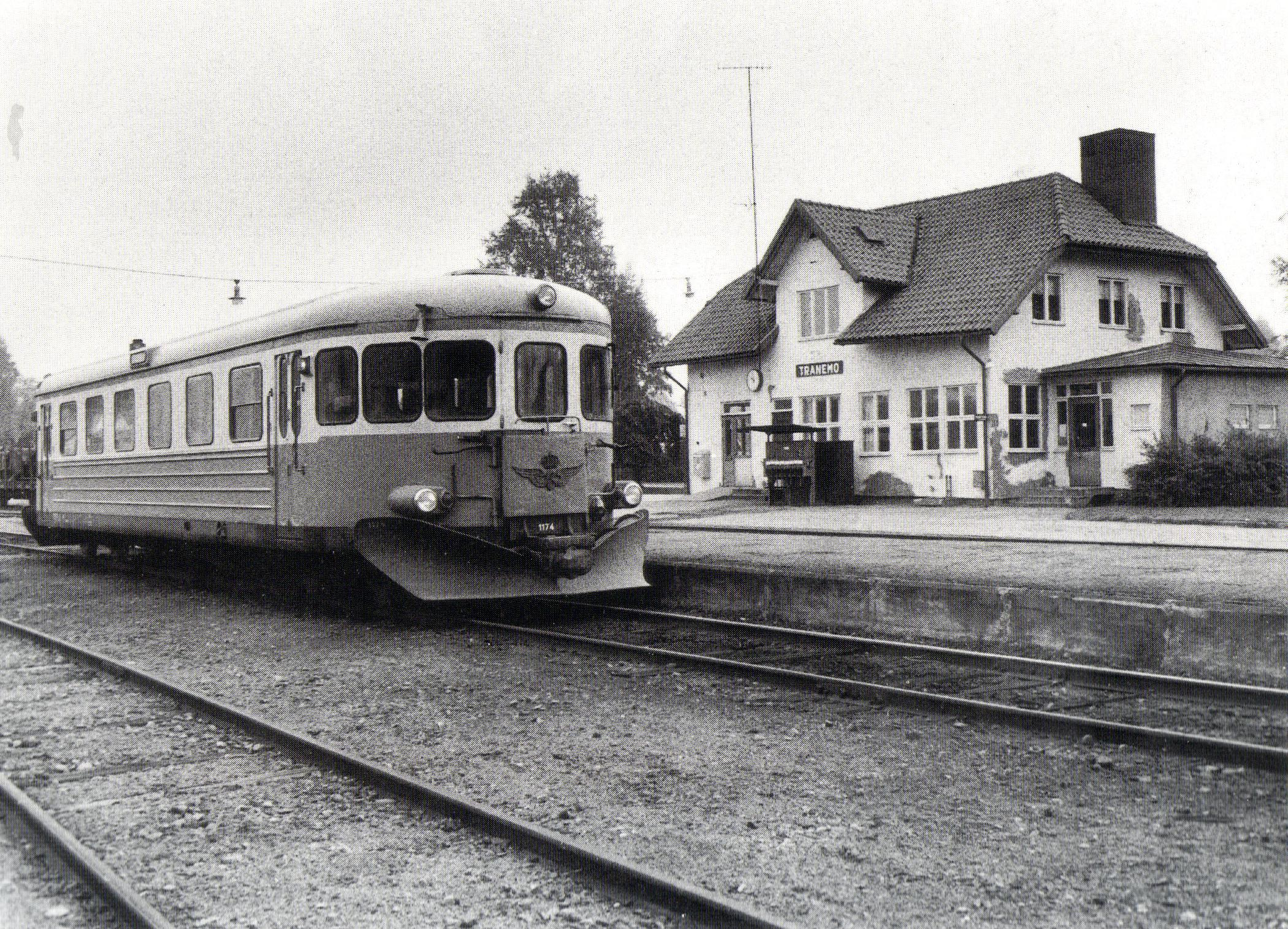
- old Tranemo East Train Station

- Location within Västra Götaland Location within Sweden
- Coordinates: 57°29′N 13°21′E
- Country: Sweden
- Province: Västergötland
- County: Västra Götaland County
- Municipality: Tranemo Municipality

Area
  - Total: 2.99 km^{2} (1.15 sq mi)

Population (31 December 2010)
  - Total: 3,168
  - Density: 1,059/km^{2} (2,740/sq mi)
- Time zone: UTC+1 (CET)
  - Summer (DST): UTC+2 (CEST)
- Climate: Cfb

Tranemo is a locality and the seat of Tranemo Municipality, Västra Götaland County, Sweden with 3,168 inhabitants in 2010.
