= Midnight Sunshine =

- Album cover

Studio album by Kikki Danielsson
- Released: September 1984
- Recorded: Star Gem Studio, Nashville, Tennessee, United States, 1984
- Genre: Country pop
- Label: Mariann Records
- Producer: Andy di Martino

Kikki Danielsson chronology
Singles Bar (1983)	Midnight Sunshine (1984)	Kikkis 15 bästa låtar (1984)

Midnight Sunshine is a 1984 studio album from Kikki Danielsson. She went to Nashville, Tennessee in the United States to record "Midnight Sunshine" in the Star Gem Studio. The album also entered the Swedish Albums Chart, peaking at number 24. The album was re-released to CD in 1995.

== Track listing ==
Side A
No.	Title	Writer(s)	Length
1.	"Wasn't that Love"	Mitch Johnson	2.21
2.	"Undercover Lovers"	Paul Hotchkiss, S. Johnson	2.50
3.	"Somebody Else Will"	Kendall Hayes	3.14
4.	"Fallin in Love, Fallin' Apart"	Mitch Johnson, Harry Shannon	3.24
5.	"Waltz in Love Tonight"	Tom Davey, Johnny Macrae, Bob Morrison	2.56
6.	"Don't Slam the Door"	Anders Glenmark, Thomas Minor	3.15

Side A
No.	Title	Writer(s)	Length
1.	"Midnight Sunshine"	Jim Dowell, Mitch Johnson	2.36
2.	"Everyday People"	Max Barnes, Troy Seals	3.10
3.	"If I Ever Fall in Love Again"	B. Clifford, Robert di Piero	2.16
4.	"Babe in Arms"	Ed Bruce, Ron Peterson	3.15
5.	"The Star"	Lee Arnold Bach	2.40
6.	"Totally in Love with You"	Charlie Black, Tommy Rocco	2.50

== Contributing musicians ==
- Stu Basore, Steel guitar
- Haywood Bishop, drums
- Kikki Danielsson, Vocals
- Leo Jackson, guitar
- Mike Leech, bass
- Roger Morris, keyboard
- Bil VornDick Engineer

== Charts ==
Chart (1984)	Peak position
Sweden (Sverigetopplistan)	24
