= Den lilla fågeln =

Song by Karin Gustafsson and Mikael Timmermann
- Released: 1981
- Songwriter: Karin Gustafsson

Den lilla fågeln is a song that Karin Gustafsson and Mikael Timmermann from Getinge appeared in the television show Chansen that originally aired over Sveriges Television in early 1981. The song was written by Karin Gustafsson, and received major airplay over Sveriges Radio Halland.

The song lyrics tell a story about young girl named Lena, who is sleeping on a Sunday morning when being wakened up by a bird appearing next to her window looking for food, and she wants to let the bird in for a while, but not strip the bird on its freedom.

== Other recordings ==
In 1984, the song was recorded by Stig Lorentz on the album Räck ut din hand, and in 1989 Thord Åhman recorded the song on the album På väg 3.

Stefan Borsch scored a Svensktoppen hit charting for 20 weeks between 29 November 1987–17 April 1988.

Paul Sahlin wrote another lyris version, Luffarpojken, describing a young boy on the run from an orphanage, who sleeps at the haylofts and prays to the Lord wondering who his parents are. With these lyrics the sogn was recorded by Paul Sahlin and Säwes at the album named after the song. and by Jirix on the 1988 album Hemmets jord.
