= Ljungsarp =

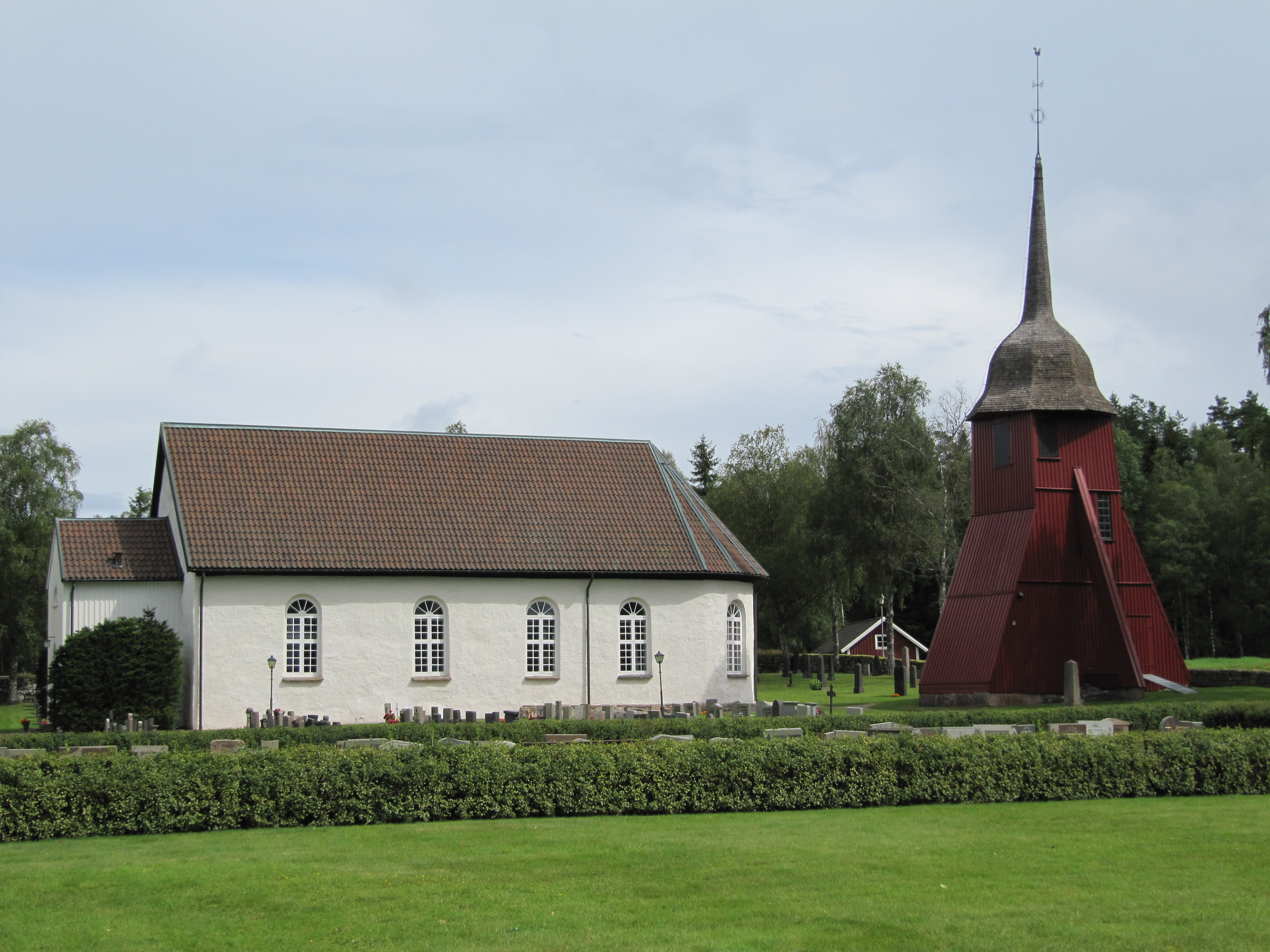

- Location within Västra Götaland Location within Sweden
- Coordinates: 57°34′N 13°34′E
- Country: Sweden
- Province: Västergötland
- County: Västra Götaland County
- Municipality: Tranemo Municipality

Area
  - Total: 0.40 km^{2} (0.15 sq mi)

Population (31 December 2010)
  - Total: 203
  - Density: 502/km^{2} (1,300/sq mi)
- Time zone: UTC+1 (CET)
  - Summer (DST): UTC+2 (CEST)
- Climate: Dfb

Ljungsarp is a locality situated in Tranemo Municipality, Västra Götaland County, Sweden with 203 inhabitants in 2010.
