= Tranemo Municipality =

Tranemo Municipality Tranemo kommun
- Municipality
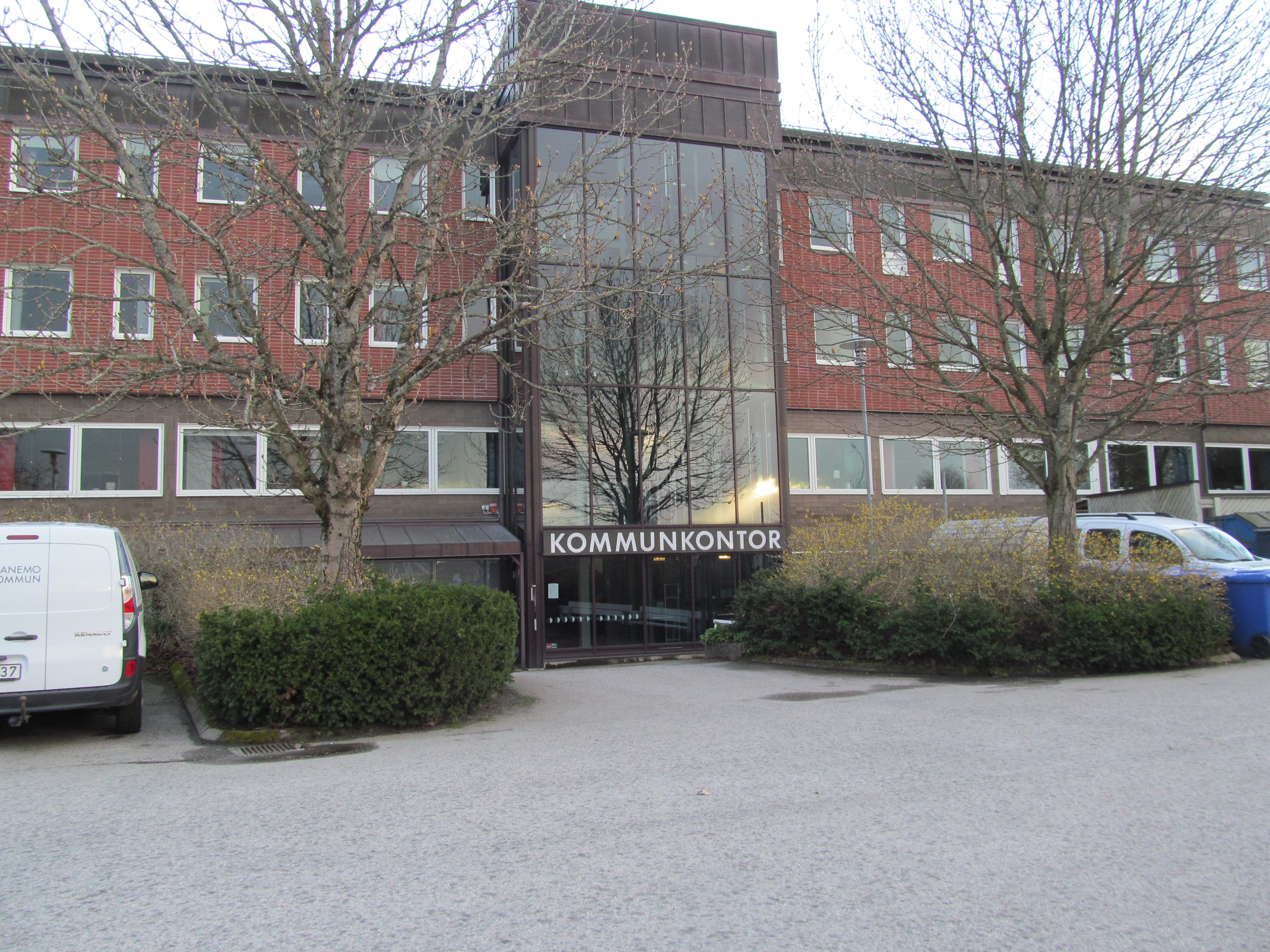
- Tranemo municipal offices

- Coat of arms

- Coordinates: 57°29′N 13°21′E
- Country: Sweden
- County: Västra Götaland County
- Seat: Tranemo

Area
  - Total: 778.48 km^{2} (300.57 sq mi)
  - Land: 741.27 km^{2} (286.21 sq mi)
  - Water: 37.21 km^{2} (14.37 sq mi)
- Area as of 1 January 2014.

Population (30 June 2025)
  - Total: 11,893
  - Density: 16.044/km^{2} (41.554/sq mi)
- Time zone: UTC+1 (CET)
  - Summer (DST): UTC+2 (CEST)
- ISO 3166 code: SE
- Province: Västergötland
- Municipal code: 1452
- Website: www.tranemo.se

Tranemo Municipality (Swedish: Tranemo kommun) is a municipality in Västra Götaland County in western Sweden. Its seat is located in the town of Tranemo.

There are twelve original municipal units (as of 1863) in the area. The municipal reform of 1952 created four larger entities. The next reform was implemented in two steps with amalgamations taking place in 1967 and 1974, leading to the present municipality.

The name comes from the bird Trana, which means crane.

The coat of arms, granted in 1975, show a crane with a glass blowing belge. Glass blowing is an old industry in the municipality, with the first glass blower established in 1741.

== Controversies ==
In 2021, Tranemo Municipality hired a poet to create one poem a week about Tranemo Municipality for 1 year. The project drew heavy criticism because of its cost – nearly 1 million Swedish crowns (SEK). This happened at the same time when municipality demanded 17 million SEK in cost savings from the municipal schools. This incident resulted in a major crisis in Tranemo municipality.

== Localities ==
Localities in Tranemo Municipality with population numbers from 2004 to 2006:

- Tranemo 3,205
- Limmared 1,445
- Länghem 1,178
- Dalstorp 824
- Grimsås 779
- Ambjörnarp 310
- Ljungsarp 274
- Uddebo 263
- Sjötofta 239
- Nittorp 211

== Demographics ==
This is a demographic table based on Tranemo Municipality's electoral districts in the 2022 Swedish general election sourced from SVT's election platform, in turn taken from SCB official statistics.

In total there were 11,931 residents, including 8,981 Swedish citizens of voting age. 45.8% voted for the left coalition and 52.8% for the right coalition. Indicators are in percentage points except population totals and income.

Location	Residents	Citizen adults	Left vote	Right vote	Employed	Swedish parents	Foreign heritage	Income SEK	Degree
Location			%	%					
Ambjörnarp	2,107	1,577	46.4	51.9	80	68	32	23,726	26
Dalstorp	1,365	1,095	47.2	52.0	87	83	17	25,921	29
Grimsås	1,413	1,084	41.3	57.0	86	84	16	26,744	26
Limmared	1,537	1,041	50.1	48.8	78	69	31	24,446	24
Länghem	1,905	1,438	37.4	61.0	89	88	12	26,171	29
Tranemo V	1,768	1,340	49.3	49.8	86	82	18	26,589	32
Tranemo Ö	1,836	1,406	46.1	52.5	85	73	27	26,476	30
Source: SVT
