= I dag & i morgon (song) =

Single by Kikki Danielsson
- Released: 13 March 2006
- Genre: Pop
- Songwriters: Thomas G:son, Calle Kindbom

"I dag & i morgon" is a song written by Thomas G:son and Calle Kindbom and performed by Swedish pop and country singer Kikki Danielsson at Melodifestivalen 2006. The song competed in heat 2 at the Löfbergs Lila Arena in Karlstad on 25 February and qualified directly to the final at the Stockholm Globe Arena on 18 March, where it got 10th place. Kikki Danielsson recorded the song for the 2006 album with the same name.

On 16 April 2006, the song entered Svensktoppen, reaching a peak position of 6th. On 30 April, the song was removed from the chart. It also appeared on Sverigetopplistan (at the time known as Hitlistan) and reached a peak position of 27th.

In the lyrics of I dag & i morgon (Today and tomorrow), the singer tells her lover that she wants to live with the lover today, tomorrow, and the rest of her life.

== Single ==
The single I dag & i morgon was released on 13 March 2006, and consisted of the title track and a cover of Yesterday Once More. Dragan Tanasković assisted in producing the single and cover.

=== Track listing ===
1. I dag & i morgon - 2:59
2. Yesterday Once More - 4:57

== Contributing musicians ==
=== I dag & i morgon ===
  - Backing vocals - Johanna Beijbom, Thomas G:son
  - Guitar - Stefan Jonsson, Thomas G:son
  - Mixed by - Bo Reimer
  - Producer - Thomas G:son

=== Yesterday Once More ===
  - Producer - Thomas Thörnholm

== Chart performance ==
Chart (2006)	Peak positions
Sweden (Sverigetopplistan)	27
