= Varför är kärleken röd? (song) =

Single by Kikki Danielsson

from the album Varför är kärleken röd?
- A-side: "Varför är kärleken röd?"
- B-side: "Bara du"
- Released: 1983
- Genre: schlager
- Label: Mariann
- Songwriter: Torgny Söderberg

Varför är kärleken röd? (Why is love red?) is a song in Swedish with text and music by Torgny Söderberg. It was sung by Swedish country and pop singer Kikki Danielsson when it finished 2nd in the Swedish Melodifestivalen 1983. Varför är kärleken röd? was also released as a single in 1983, with the song Du skriver dina kärlekssånger as the B-side.

Birthe Kjær covered the song in 1983 with lyrics in Danish, as Hvorfor er kærlighed rød?.

At the eighth season of TV4's TV-show Så mycket bättre, the song was recorded by Sabina Ddumba.

== Track listing ==
=== Side A ===
1. Varför är kärleken röd?

=== Side B ===
1. Du skriver dina kärlekssånger
