= Lövgrens =

- Also known as: Claes Lövgrens (1994–2017)
- Origin: Billesholm, Sweden
- Genres: Dansband
- Years active: 1994–present
- Members: Claes Lövgren; Calle Stillfors; Henrik Wallrin; Johan Fredriksson
- Website: lovgrensorkester.se

Lövgrens is a Swedish dansband formed in Billesholm in 1994. The group consists of Claes Lövgren, Calle Stillfors, Henrik Wallrin and Johan Fredriksson. The band scored album chart successes in Sweden by the early 2010s. The band was named after singer Claes Lövgren. In 2007, the band's drummer Johan Fredriksson was awarded the "drummer of the year". The band was known as Claes Lövgrens until 2017.

Lövgrens has played together since 1994, and since new-year 2002-2003 the band is a full-time band, touring all over Sweden.

== Personnel ==
Current members

- Claes Lövgren – vocals, guitars, accordion, keyboards, saxophones (1994–present)
- Calle Stillfors – vocals, guitars (2013–present)
- Henrik Wallrin – bass (2016–present)
- Johan Fredriksson – drums (2003–2008, 2017–present)

Former members

- Nicke Fredriksson – vocals, guitars, keyboards (1994–2013)
- Olle Fredriksson – vocals, bass (1994–2013)
- Andy Johansson – drums, vocals (2007–2017)
- Anti Johansson – guitars, saxophones (2011–2016)
- Andreas Olsson – bass (2013–2016)

== Discography ==
- Rosor från himlen (2001)
- Dansvänliga låtar (2005)
- Dansvänliga låtar 2 (2008)
- Vi lever nu (2010)
- Bästa (2013)
- Vi börjar om igen! (2014)
- Härlig är Jorden (2015) (joint album credited to Åsa Sjöberg & Claes Lövgren)
- Vägen hem (2016)
