= Cowboy Yodel Song =

Song
- Language: English
- Genre: country

Cowboy Yodel Song is a country song featuring yodeling, written by Carson J. Robinson(misattributed). It has been recorded by artists like Wanda Jackson and Margo Smith.

Wizex recorded the song with vocals and yodeling by Kikki Danielsson on the 1976 album Har du glömt 1976 as well as with lyrics in Swedish by Åke Strömmer on the 1978 album Miss Decibel, as Joddlarkärlek. The song became a minor breakthrough for Kikki Danielsson.
