= Bengt Hennings =

- Origin: Länghem, Sweden
- Genres: dansband music
- Years active: 1967-present

Bengt Hennings is a dansband from Länghem in Sweden, established in 1967, and scoring album chart successes in Sweden by the late 2000s-early 2010s. The band participated at Dansbandskampen 2008. The band made it further from the first programme together with Scotts, before getting knocked out by Larz-Kristerz in the second programme, only to be revoted into the finals. The band's wind section won a Guldklaven Award in 2008 in the year wind musicians of the year. The band has also participated in the documentary film Får jag lov - till den sista dansen?, and in the movie "På väg till Täfteå".

== Discography ==
=== Albums ===
- Bengt Hennings 93 - 1993
- Bengt Hennings 95 - 1995 (CD-single, five songs)
- Studio & live - 2001
- Alla dessa underbara år - 2003
- Bäst av allt - 2007
- Låt kärleken slå till - 2009
- Golden Hits - 2011
- Scenen är vår - 2012
- Dansbandspärlor - 2014
- Vår skőna sommar - 2015
