= Länghem =

- Location within Västra Götaland Location within Sweden
- Coordinates: 57°36′N 13°14′E
- Country: Sweden
- Province: Västergötland
- County: Västra Götaland County
- Municipality: Tranemo Municipality

Area
  - Total: 1.03 km^{2} (0.40 sq mi)

Population (31 December 2010)
  - Total: 989
  - Density: 960/km^{2} (2,500/sq mi)
- Time zone: UTC+1 (CET)
  - Summer (DST): UTC+2 (CEST)
- Climate: Cfb

Länghem is a locality situated in Tranemo Municipality, Västra Götaland County, Sweden with 989 inhabitants in 2010.
