= James Cates (academic) =

American psychologist and author

James A. Cates
- Occupation: Psychologist

Academic work
- Discipline: Psychology
- Institutions: Cates & Associates, Inc.
- Website: catesandassociates.org

James A. Cates (born 1956) is an American psychologist and author. He is an adjunct professor at Purdue University Fort Wayne.

== Books ==
- Serving the Amish: A Cultural Guide for Professionals (2014, Johns Hopkins University Press)
- Love, Life, & Laughter: The Amish in Essays and Stories (2017, Cates & Associates)
- Serpent in the Garden: Amish Sexuality in a Changing World (2020, Johns Hopkins University Press)
- If This Is Heaven, Show Me Hell: Devotions for The Rebellious Christian (2021, Covenant Books)
- Offenders and the Sexual Abuse of Children: Interventions and Limitations (2024, Routledge)
- Dancing on the Devil's Playground: The Amish Negotiate with Modernity (2024, Johns Hopkins University Press)
