= Bra vibrationer (song) =

1985 song by Kikki Danielsson

Single by Kikki Danielsson
- Language: Swedish
- B-side: "Plingeling"
- Released: 1984
- Composer: Lasse Holm
- Lyricist: Ingela Forsman

Eurovision Song Contest 1985 entry
- Country: Sweden
- Artist: Kikki Danielsson
- Language: Swedish
- Composer: Lasse Holm
- Lyricist: Ingela Forsman
- Conductor: Curt-Eric Holmquist

Finals performance
- Final result: 3rd
- Final points: 103

Entry chronology
- ◄ "Diggi-Loo Diggi-Ley" (1984)
- "E' de' det här du kallar kärlek?" (1986) ►

"Bra vibrationer" (Swedish pronunciation: [ˈbrɑː vɪbraˈɧǔːnɛr]; "Good vibrations"), is a song composed by Lasse Holm with lyrics by Ingela Forsman, and performed by Kikki Danielsson. It represented Sweden in the Eurovision Song Contest 1985 after winning Melodifestivalen 1985.

== History ==
Danielsson won the right to perform at the contest, held in Gothenburg, by winning the Swedish national final, Melodifestivalen 1985, where she was the first singer to perform. The song won by seven points over the second-place finisher, Dan Tillberg with his song "Ta min hand" ("Take my hand").

In Gothenburg, the song was performed sixteenth on the night, after Switzerland's Mariella Farré and Pino Gasparini with "Piano, Piano", and before Austria's Gary Lux with "Kinder dieser Welt". At the end of judging that evening, "Bra vibrationer" took the third-place slot with 103 points. Finland and Norway both awarded Sweden 12 points that night. Danielsson's performance was backed up by dancers Mary Johnson and David Johnson.

Sung in contemporary schlager music style, the singer relates her strong emotions upon falling in love with a man with whom she had just met. She is concerned about things moving too fast, but in the end, she feels "good vibrations" and is very happy with what has transpired.

After Eurovision, the song was placed at number 12 on the Swedish Singles Chart, and it stayed in the top 50 for eight weeks.

== Track listing (single) ==
1. Bra vibrationer
2. Plingeling

== Trivia ==
- Lena Philipsson was asked to participate with "Bra vibrationer", but declined.

== Other recordings ==
- Swedish musician Magnus Svensson recorded the song on his 1985 album The Organ Sounds of Magnus.
- Swedish group Lars Vegas trio recorded the song on their 1993 maxisingle-CD Kikki Resque.
- At Körslaget 2008 the song was performed by Siw Malmkvist's Team Siw, and its version also appeared on the official compilation album.
- At Dansbandskampen 2008 the song was performed by Scotts.
- A Framåt fredag version was called "Bra sensationer" ("Good sensations") describing newspapers' attempts to sell copies. Another version in the same radio programme was called "För många nationer" ("Too many nations") referring to the discussions of neighboring votes at the Eurovision Song Contest.
- In 2015 Kumba M'bye and Amanda Serra performed an own version at TV4's Lyckliga gatan.
- As a part of the eighth season of Så mycket bättre, a cover version of the song was released by fellow Melodifestivalen winner Eric Saade. Saade's version, titled "Bra vibrationer (vill ha mer)", featured additional lyrics as well as an updated sound.

== Charts ==
=== Kumba M'bye & Amanda Serra ===
Chart (2015)	Peak position
Sweden (Sverigetopplistan)	63

=== Eric Saade ===
Chart (2017)	Peak position
Sweden (Sverigetopplistan)	72

Preceded by Diggi-Loo Diggi-Ley by Herreys	Melodifestivalen winners 1985	Succeeded by E' de' det här du kallar kärlek? by Lasse Holm and Monica Törnell
