= Larz-Kristerz =

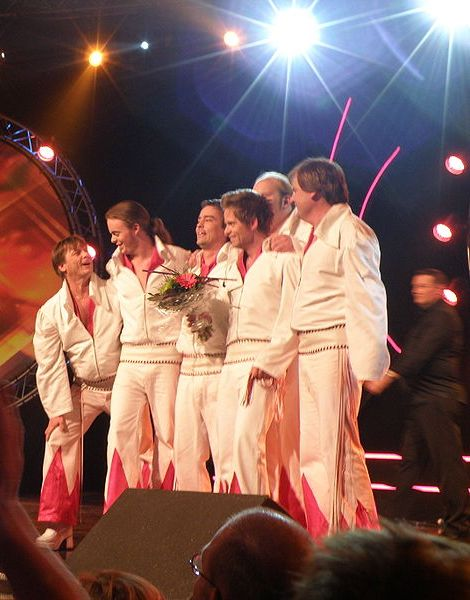
- Larz-Kristerz

Background information
- Origin: Älvdalen, Sweden
- Genres: Dansband
- Years active: 2001–present

Larz-Kristerz is a Swedish dansband founded in Älvdalen, Sweden, in 2001, and winner of the 2008 edition of Dansbandskampen. Hem till dig stopped U2's No Line On the Horizon from reaching number 1, the only country where the album did not reach this position.

== Members ==
- Stefan Nykvist
- Peter Larsson
- Kent Lindén
- Trond Korsmoe
- Morgan Korsmoe
- Mikael Eriksson
- Torbjörn Eriksson

== Discography ==
=== Albums ===
Year		Peak positions	Certification
Year		SWE	Certification
2003	Stuffparty 1	—	
2004	Stuffparty 2	—	
2007	Stuffparty 3	—	
2009	Hem till dig	1	
2009	Om du vill	1	
2010	Små ord av guld	1	
2011	Från Älvdalen till Nashville	1	
2013	Det måste gå att dansa till	2	Gold
2014	40 mil från Stureplan	2	
2015	Våra bästa! (compilation album)	1	
2016	Rätt å slätt	1	
2018	Det går bra nu	7	
2020	Lättare sagt än gjort	8	
2021	Stuffparty 4	15	
2025	För vägens vind	26	

=== Singles ===
Title	Year	Peak positions	Album
Title	Year	SWE	Album
"Carina"	2009	1	Hem till dig
"Hem till dig"	2009	—	Hem till dig
"Monte Carlo"	2009	—	Hem till dig
"En riktig Volvo EPA"	2023	—	Landsvägsserenader
"Lova mig mer än natten"	2023	—	Landsvägsserenader
"Låt hjulen rulla"	2023	—	Landsvägsserenader
"Carina" (J.O.X Remix)	2023	—	Landsvägsserenader
"Koppången"	2023	83	Non-album single
