= Paul Sahlin =

Swedish singer

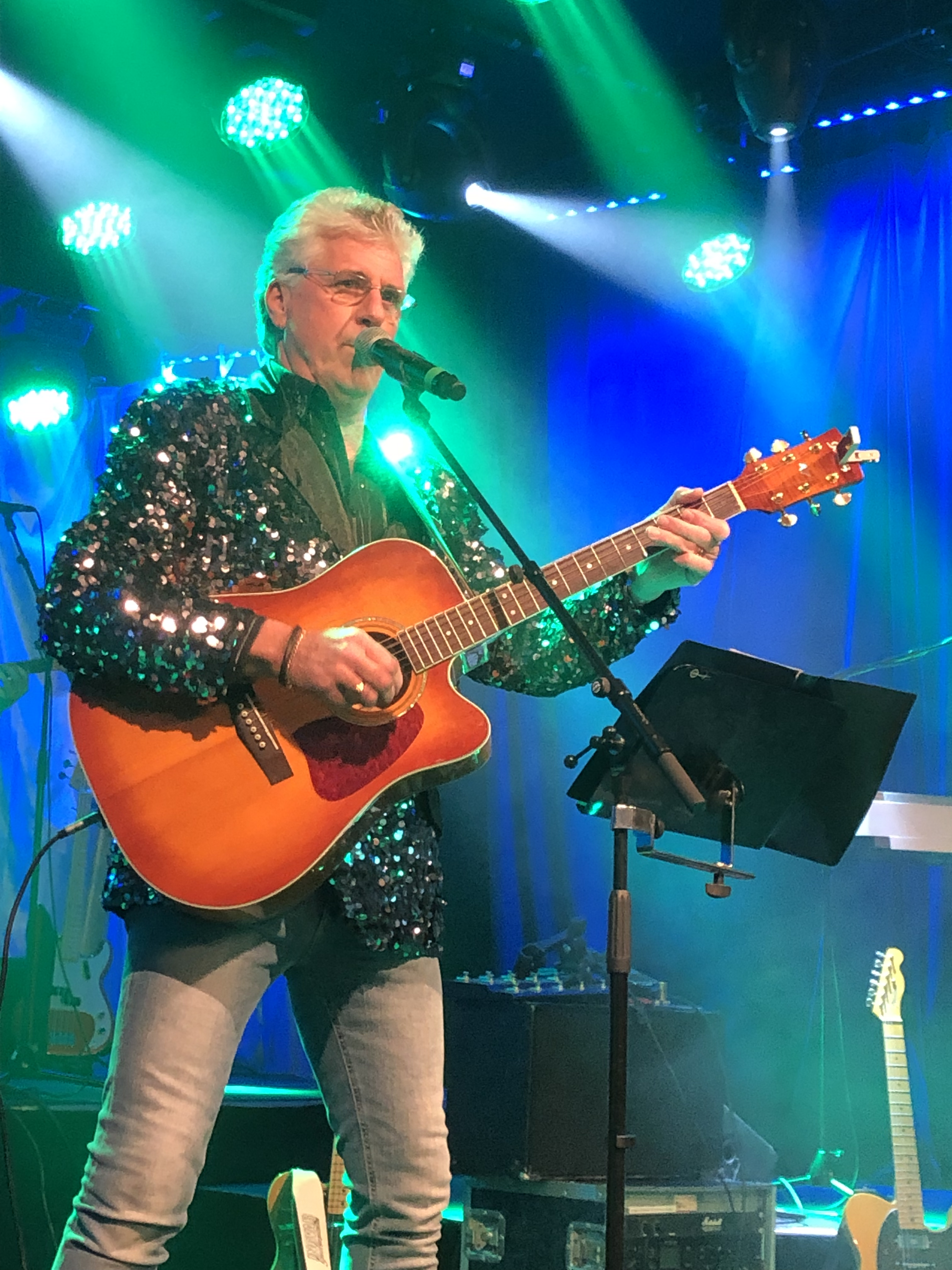
- Sahlin performing in September 2019

Background information
- Also known as: Paul Paljett
- Born: Paul Johansson; 30 March 1955 (age 71); Trollhättan, Sweden
- Occupations: Singer; songwriter; musician
- Years active: 1970s–present
- Website: paulpaljett.com
- Musical career
- Genres: Dansband; pop; schlager
- Instruments: Vocals; guitar
- Label: Mariann
- Formerly of: Matz Bladhs

Paul Sahlin (born Paul Johansson; 30 March 1955), known by his stage name Paul Paljett, is a Swedish singer, songwriter and musician. Later he became a funeral director. He is well known for songs like the 1977 Svensktoppen hit Guenerina., Flyg min fjäril flyg and the Christmas song Jag önskar er alla en riktigt god jul. He also was the singer in Matz Bladhs between 1991 and 2004. Earlier, he had been the singer in the band Säwes. Later, he became active with his dansband Paul Sahlins.

== Discography ==
- Två sidor (1976)
- Mumbo Jumbo (1977)
- At Your Service (1978)

== Svensktoppen songs ==
- 1975-1976 - Oh Baby
- 1976 - C'est la vie
- 1976 - Tom och Helen
- 1977 - Guenerina
- 1977 - Ingen vind, ingen våg
- 1978 - Jag vill ge dig ett äventyr
- 1978 - Misslyckade mig
- 1980 - Tusen sekunder
- 1987 - Golden Gate
- 1987 - Ung och evig (duet with Anne Kihlström)
- 1987 - Luffarpojken (with Säwes)
- 1991 - Andante, Andante
