= Tore Halvorsen =

Tore H. Halvorsen (59) is the Senior Vice President of Subsea Technologies division at FMC Technologies, a division focused on technology and systems for the exploration, drilling and developing of offshore oil and gas fields, including deepwater oil and gas production using subsea separation, boosting and processing systems.

Prior to his promotion in 2011, Halvorsen was Senior Vice President of Global Subsea Production Systems (2007), a division that handles subsea production systems in Europe, Africa, Canada and Asia. Halvorsen has also served as the Vice President og Subsea Systems Eastern Hemisphere (2004). His first director appointment, as Managing Director of FMC Kongsberg Subsea AS, came in 1994 following FMC Technologies´ purchase of Kongsberg Offshore in 1993.

Halvorsen earned his master´s degree in Mechanical Engineering from the Norwegian Institute of Technology in Trondheim (now called the Norwegian University of Science and Technology), and started his career with Kongsberg Offshore AS in 1980 as Technical Manager of Subsea Systems.
