= Keith Almgren =

Swedish songwriter and music publisher (born 1957)

Keith Almgren (born Almgren Johansson on 8 November 1957) is a songwriter and music publisher from Järfälla, Sweden.

Almgren has written over 1400 titles in the register of STIM.

Almgren has participated with several songs in the Swedish part of the Eurovision Song Contest as music publisher but also as songwriter. For example, he participated in the Eurovision Song Contest as music publisher for Roger Pontare with "When spirits are calling my name" 2000 in the Melodifestivalen in Stockholm and was publisher for Take me to your heaven which won the Swedish contest with Charlotte Nilsson and also won the European Song Contest in Jerusalem 1999.

Keith Almgren wrote the lyrics "ABC" for Anna Book 1986 and "Jag har en dröm" (in English "I have a dream") for Baden Baden in the Swedish part of the Eurovision Song Contest.

Keith Almgren is the owner of Sweden Songs (Music Publishing Company). He has worked at Stim, at a record company, a music publishing company (Scandinavian Songs), at the record companies distribution branch, in record shop, as manager, artist coach and freelance music writer and radio presenter and he also teaches music students in music industry knowledge.

== Sources ==
- SKAP Biography Keith Almgren Swedish Composers of Popular Music
- SKAP Members Swedish Composers of Popular Music
- Article
- Article
- STIM
