= Roosarna =

Kjell Roos Band

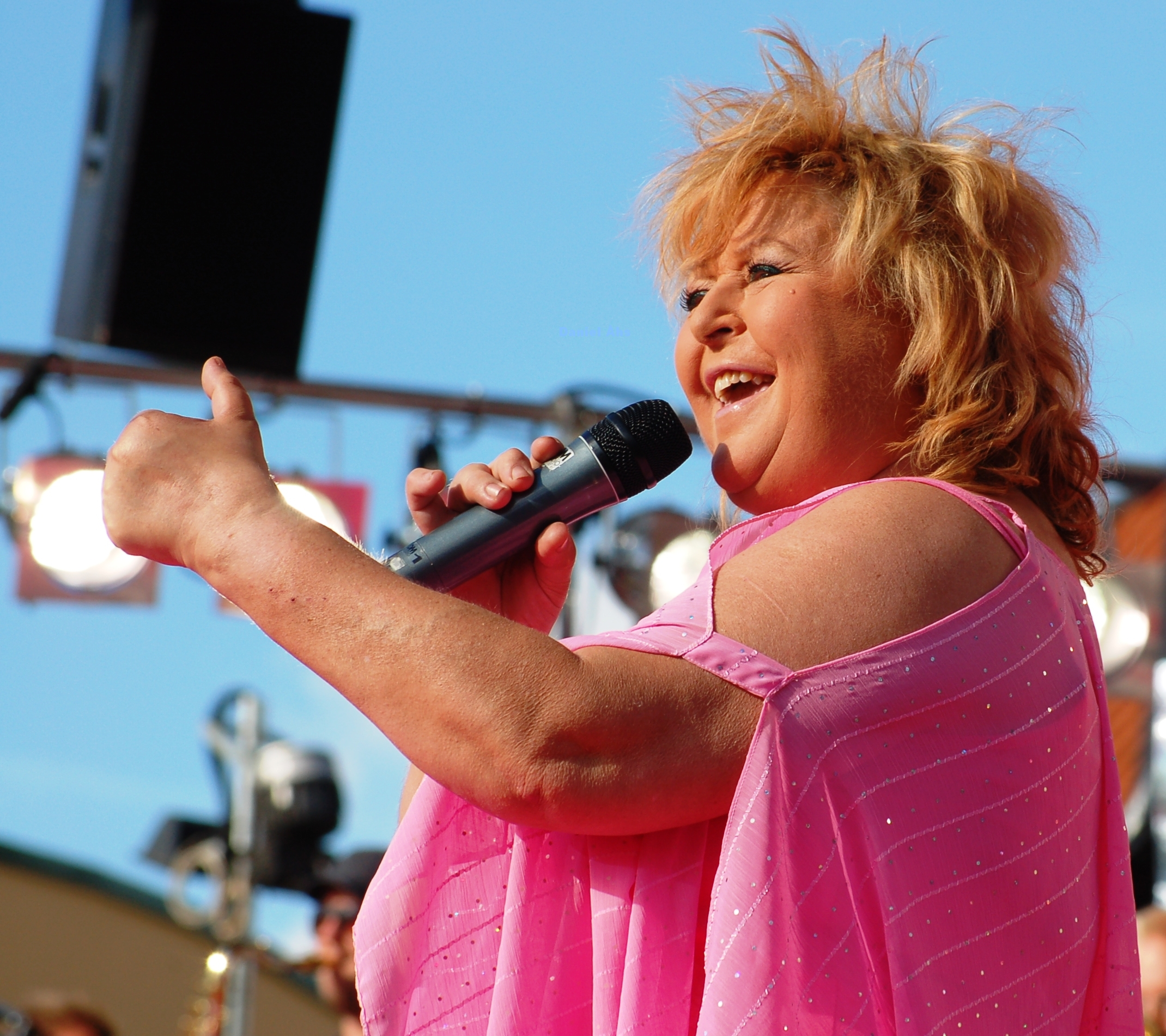
- Kikki Danielsson

Background information
- Origin: Sweden
- Genres: Country, Dansband music
- Years active: 1969–present
- Members: Kjell Roos (vocals and guitar), Lennart Brink (bass), Kent Lovén (drums), Danne Wirenberg (guitar), Marcus Fernholm (keyboard)
- Past members: Kikki Danielsson (lead vocals)

Roosarna, also known as the Kjell Roos Band, is a dansband in Vallsta, Sweden. The band was formed in 1969 by the brothers Kjell, Anders and Sven-Åke as Bröderna Roos (the Roos brothers). In the mid-1970s they changed their name to Roosarna. Since 1975, it is a full-time playing band. In 1982, the band began to collaborate with Kikki Danielsson.

In 1990 the cooperation was increased when they began to appear as Kikki Danielsson & Roosarna, and scored several Svensktoppen hits during the 1990s. Kikki Danielsson & Roosarna was awarded a Grammis in 1994 for the album Vet du vad jag vet. In September 1996 they changed their name to Kikki Danielssons orkester.

In 1998, the band toured in church buildings, and the same year released material in Germany. When Kikki Danielsson left the band in February 2000, the band took the name Kjell Roos Band. In February 2003, however, Kikki Danielsson once again began to tour with the band.

For the 2008–2009 Christmas and holiday season the band began to tour with Magnus Carlsson. In 2011 and 2012 the band accompanied Johnny Logan during a church tour.

== Members ==
- Kjell Roos – vocals and guitar
- Kikki Danielsson – lead vocals. Left the band in 1999.
- Lennart Brink – bass
- Kent Lovén – drums
- Danne Wirenberg – guitar
- Marcus Fernholm – keyboard

== Discography ==
=== Albums ===
Title	Release
Vi hörs	1975
Jag tror att jag är fast för dej	1984
I kväll är det party	1985
Livet är nu	1988
På lugnare vatten	1990
En enda gång	1992
Vet du vad jag vet?	1994
Hem till Norden	1996
Ett hus med många rum	1997
Dagar som kommer och går	1999
Nu börjar livet	2001
Vad livet har att ge	2005
