= Kjell Roos =

- Born: 11 March 1956 (age 70); Arbrå Parish, Sweden
- Genres: Country, Dansband music
- Occupations: Singer, musician, songwriter
- Instrument: Guitar
- Years active: 1969–
- Label: Mariann
- Member of: Kjell Roos Band

Kjell Roos (born 11 March 1956), is a Swedish guitarist and singer.

Roos leads the Swedish dansband Kjell Roos Band, earlier known as Roosarna. He has done duets with Swedish singer Kikki Danielsson such as I juletid (Save Your Love), Kvällens sista dans and Har du glömt?. In 1994, Kikki Danielsson & Roosarna received a Grammis for "Dansband of the year" for the album Vet du vad jag vet.
