= Ingela Forsman =

Swedish lyricist in popular music

- Also known as: Pling
- Born: 26 August 1950 (age 76); Essinge
- Genres: Dansband music, Pop, Rock, Schlager
- Occupations: Composer; lyricist; singer

Ingela Birgitta "Pling" Forsman (born 26 August 1950 in Essinge, Sweden) is a Swedish lyricist in popular music. As a student Forsman attended the Adolf Fredrik's Music School in Stockholm. 1981–2009, 33 of her songs have competed in the Swedish Melodifestivalen, three of them winners: Bra vibrationer (1985), Se på mej (1995) and Kärleken är (1998). She has also written the text to psalm number 862 in the Swedish hymn book, Blomningstid, and two children's books.

Her older sister first called her 'Pling', and she is now commonly referred to as 'Pling Forsman'.

Her first public performance was on the Swedish children's radio show Barnens Brevlåda in 1954.

== Songs in Melodifestivalen written by Ingela Forsman ==
- 1981 - Men natten är vår - placed 5th
- 1983 - Bara en enda gång - placed 5th
- 1984
  - Kall som is - placed 4th
  - Tjuvarnas natt - shared 5th place
- 1985
  - Bra vibrationer - winner for Kikki Danielsson
  - 1 + 1 = 2 - eliminated in first voting round
  - Jag vet hur det känns - placed 5th
- 1986 - ABCD - eliminated
- 1987
  - När morgonstjärnan brinner - placed 3rd
  - Det finns en morgondag - eliminated
- 1988
  - Nästa weekend - eliminated
  - Om igen - placed 2nd
- 1989
  - Du (öppnar min värld) - placed 4th
  - Nattens drottning - shared 5th place
- 1993 - Närmare dig - unplaced
- 1995 - Se på mej - winner
- 1998 - Kärleken är - winner
- 2000 - När jag tänker på imorgon - shared 2nd place
- 2001 - Ingemansland - placed 4th
- 2004
  - Min kärlek - placed 2nd
  - Efharisto - eliminated in second chance round
- 2005 - Håll om mig - placed 2nd
- 2006
  - Etymon - eliminated in semifinal
  - En droppe regn - eliminated in the second chance round
  - Jag ljuger så bra - placed 7th
- 2007 - Jag måste kyssa dig - eliminated in the second chance round
- 2008:
  - I Love Europe - placed 9th
  - Den första svalan - eliminated in the semifinals
  - Jag saknar dig ibland - eliminated in the semifinals
- 2009:
  - Så vill stjärnorna - finalist
  - Med hjärtat fyllt av ljus - eliminated in the semifinals
  - Jag tror på oss - eliminated in the semifinals
  - Du är älskad där du går - eliminated in the semifinals
- 2013
  - Make me no 1 - eliminated in the semifinals
- 2014
  - Casanova - eliminated in the semifinals
- 2021
  - Den du är - eliminated in the semifinals
