= Kikki Danielsson =

Swedish singer (born 1952)

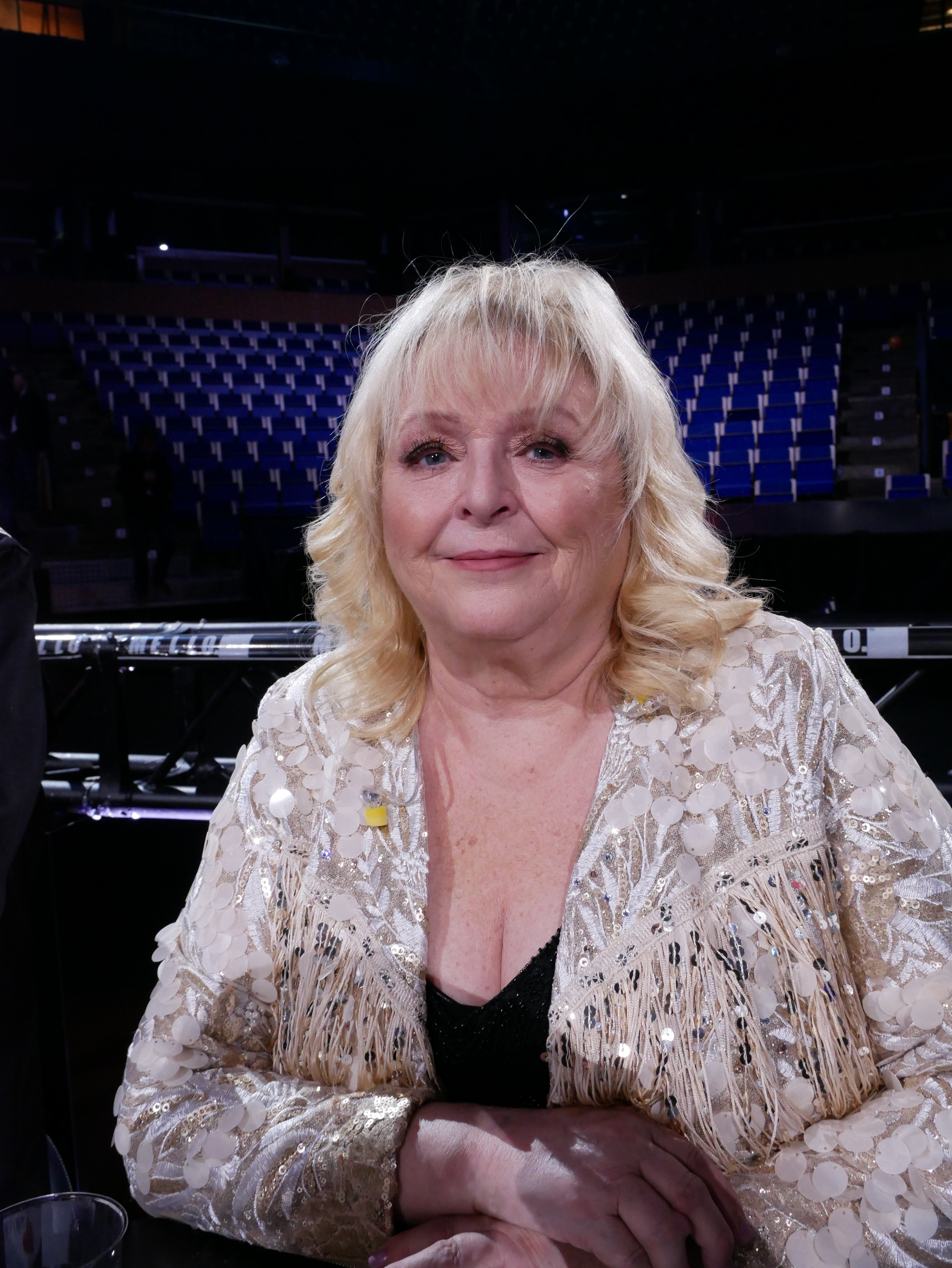
- Kikki Danielsson at Melodifestivalen 2018

Background information
- Born: 10 May 1952 (age 74); Osby, Sweden
- Genres: Country; Country pop Dansband music Pop; Schlager
- Years active: 1969–present
- Labels: Mariann Grammofon, Capitol

Ann-Kristin "Kikki" Danielsson (born 10 May 1952) is a Swedish country, dansband and pop singer. Sometimes, she also plays the accordion and she has also written some lyrics. She has gained notice for yodeling in some songs. Danielsson gained her largest popularity in the Nordic region from the late 1970s until the late 1990s. She also gained popularity at the US country stage during the 1980s. In 1986, she had the "Kikki i Nashville" TV show.

== Life and work ==
Danielsson was born in Osby, Sweden, and resides in Gävleborg.

In total, she has participated nine times at the Swedish Melodifestivalen and one time at the Norwegian Melodi Grand Prix. She has participated in the Eurovision Song Contest twice, in 1982 (as a part of the Swedish pop and country group Chips with the song "Dag efter dag", finishing 8th) and in the 1985 (solo) with the song "Bra vibrationer", finishing 3rd.

Kikki Danielsson was born in Osby, but was adopted and lived on a farm in Älmhult, Småland from the age of five. There, she became the only child in the family while her younger sister was adopted to another place. As a five-year-old girl, Kikki Danielsson made her first singing performance, which occurred at the local Sunday school's Lucia party in her Småland home church, singing the Christmas song "När Jesusbarnet låg en gång". As a child, she sang in the local church choir.

As a 17-year-old girl, Kikki Danielsson begun as a singer in dansband Nickies and in 1973 she switched to another dansband, Wizex, with which she participated at the Swedish Melodifestivalen 1978. She left Wizex in 1982, but as a member of the pop and country group Chips, she participated at the Swedish Melodifestivalen 1980, 1981 and 1982. She has also been a popular Svensktoppen artist, with hits as the Melodifestivalen songs, but also other songs, like "Papaya Coconut" in 1987. She willingly sings country and has contributed in radio and TV shows in the US in the 1980s.

During the second half of 1984, she married Swedish musician Kjell Roos, who led the dansband Roosarna, with which she sang between 1990 and 1999. In 1985 she gave birth to their first child, a daughter. In late 1987 she released the Christmas album "Min barndoms jular". Together with Roosarna, she had many Svensktoppen hits during the 1990s. In 1994, the "dansband of the year" prize at the Grammis was awarded to Kikki Danielsson & Roosarna. In 1999 she separated from Kjell Roos. However, the musical co-operation restarted in 2003.

Kikki Danielsson has also sung at the 2001 Stockholm Pride. Together with Elisabeth Andreassen and Lotta Engberg she participated at the Swedish Melodifestivalen 2002 and together they called themselves Kikki, Bettan & Lotta and had an own dinner show during the second half of 2002 and participated at the Norwegian Melodi Grand Prix in 2003. They also started a successful collaboration with the Swedish brand "twilfit" designing stretchy yet fashionable T-shirts.

Kikki Danielsson participated at Melodifestivalen 2006, which is the Swedish qualifications for the Eurovision Song Contest. She performed with the song "I dag & i morgon", written by Thomas G:son and Calle Kindbom, which reached the final in the Stockholm Globe Arena, where it finished at the 10th and last place. Totally, she has participated nine times at the Swedish Melodifestivalen and one time at Norwegian Melodi Grand Prix. In 2018, she participated in Melodifestivalen once again.

From 28 November to 17 December 2006, she toured Sweden with a band on the "Julstämning med Kikki" Christmas concert tour. Her periods of problems with alcohol have been a popular topic of the Scandinavian press (Danielsson first started drinking heavily to self-medicate as a result of her rheumatoid arthritis), as has her weight problem, in which she has become obese. Because of her weight problem, she appeared in Du är vad du äter, the Swedish version of "You Are What You Eat", in 2006 where she made great progress and lost several pounds.

In January 2010, it was announced that Kikki Danielsson together with Sören "Sulo" Karlsson and The Diamond Dogs would record the single Maybe I'll Do, and on 13 July 2010 she appeared at Allsång på Skansen. On 13 April 2011 she released the album Första dagen på resten av mitt liv, where she worked together with Sören "Sulo" Karlsson.

In 2012, Danielsson starred in the film Sean Banan inuti Seanafrika.

In 2017, she participated in the eighth season of Så mycket bättre (TV4).

Kikki Danielsson performed again at Melodifestivalen on 3 February 2018, this time with the song "Osby Tennessee", which ended up seventh and last in the semi-final following votings.

In February 2020, Kikki Danielsson was elected into the Melodifestivalen Hall of Fame.

== Melodifestivalen, Melodi Grand Prix and Eurovision entries ==
- Melodifestivalen 1978: Miss Decibel (with Wizex) – 2nd place
- Melodifestivalen 1980: Mycke' mycke' mer (with Chips) – 4th place
- Melodifestivalen 1981: God morgon (with Sweets 'n Chips) – 2nd place
- Melodifestivalen 1982: Dag efter dag (with Chips) – winner

8th place at the Eurovision Song Contest 1982

- Melodifestivalen 1983: Varför är kärleken röd? – 2nd place
- Melodifestivalen 1985: Bra vibrationer – winner

3rd place at the Eurovision Song Contest 1985

- Melodifestivalen 1992: En enda gång – 4th place
- Melodifestivalen 2002: Vem é dé du vill ha (Kikki, Bettan & Lotta) – 3rd place
- Melodi Grand Prix 2003: Din hand i min hand (Kikki, Bettan & Lotta) – 4th place
- Melodifestivalen 2006: I dag & i morgon – 10th place
- Melodifestivalen 2018: Osby Tennessee – semi-finalist

== Solo discography ==
=== Studio albums ===
- 1979: Rock'n Yodel
- 1981: Just Like a Woman
- 1982: Kikki
- 1983: Singles Bar
- 1984: Midnight Sunshine
- 1985: Bra vibrationer
- 1986: Papaya Coconut
- 1987: Min barndoms jular (Christmas album)
- 1989: Canzone d'Amore (1989)
- 1991: Vägen hem till dej
- 1992: Jag ska aldrig lämna dig
- 2001: Nu är det advent (Christmas album)
- 2011: Första dagen på resten av mitt liv
- 2015: Postcard from a Painted Lady
- 2016: Christmas Card from a Painted Lady (Christmas album)
- 2017: Portrait of a Painted Lady
- 2022: Ängel med sorgkant

=== Compilation albums ===
- 1983: Varför är kärleken röd?
- 1984: Kikkis 15 bästa låtar
- 1990: På begäran
- 1992: In Country
- 1994: På begäran 2
- 1997: Långt bortom bergen
- 1999: I mitt hjärta
- 2001: 100% Kikki
- 2001: Fri - En samling
- 2006: I dag & i morgon
- 2008: Kikkis bästa
- 2021: Miss Decibel

=== Singles ===
Title	Year	Peak chart positions	Album
Title	Year	SWE	Album
"Bra vibrationer"	1985	12	Bra vibrationer
"Osby Tennessee"	2018	—	Non-album single

Awards and achievements
Preceded by Herreys with "Diggi-Loo Diggi-Ley"	Sweden in the Eurovision Song Contest; 1985	Succeeded by Monica Törnell & Lasse Holm with "E' de' det här du kallar kärlek?"
