= Inget stoppar oss nu =

Single by Black Jack

from the album Black Jack
- A-side: "Inget stoppar oss nu"
- B-side: "I ett lusthus"
- Released: 1990
- Genre: dansband music
- Label: Frituna
- Songwriters: Ingela "Pling" Forsman (lyrics), Lasse Holm (music)

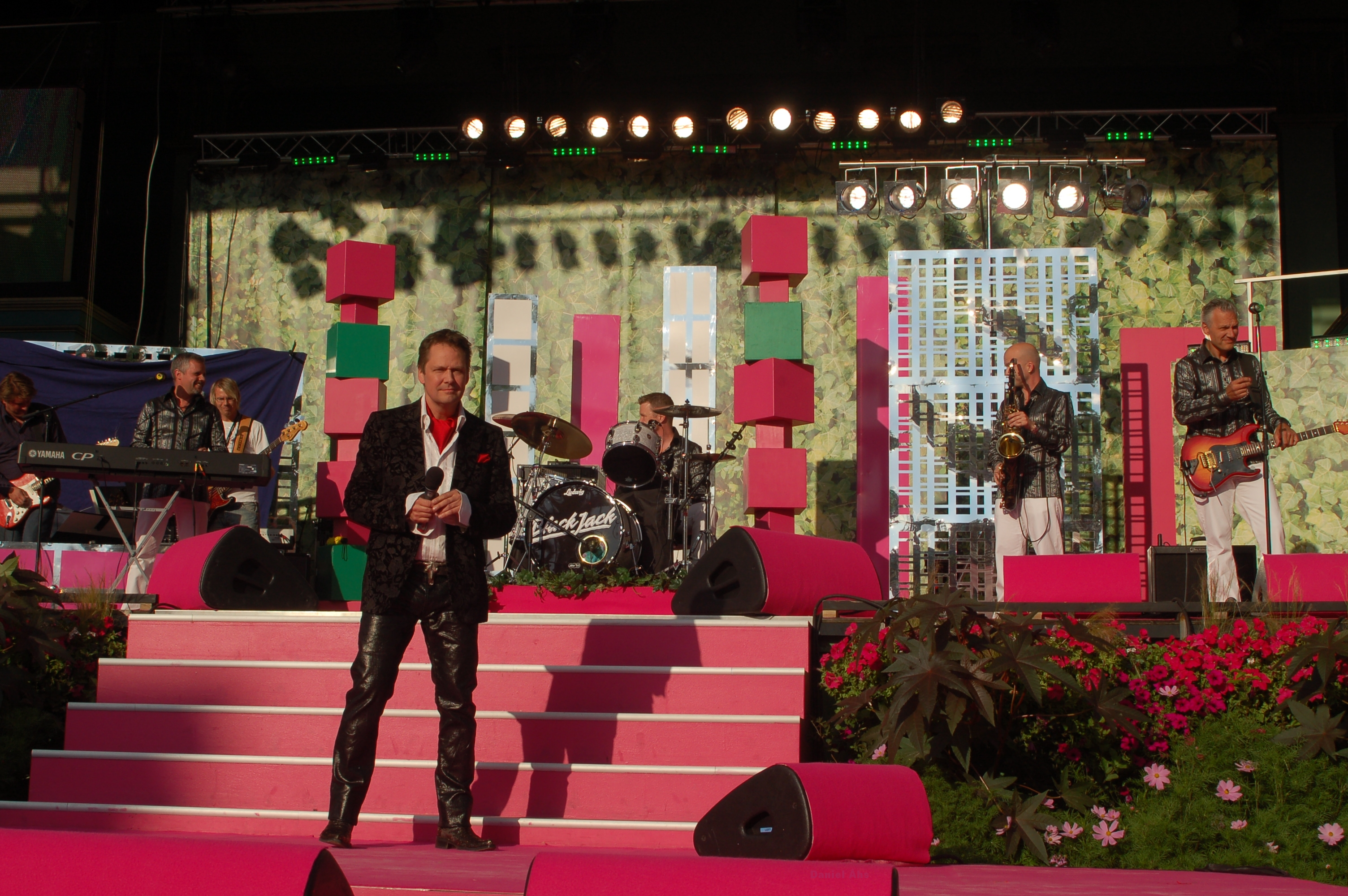
Black Jack scored an early 1990s hit with the song.

"Inget stoppar oss nu", also known as "Inget kan stoppa oss nu" or "I natt, i natt", is a song written by Lasse Holm and Ingela "Pling" Forsman, and originally intended to be performed by Haakon Pedersen at Melodifestivalen 1987. The song never entered the contest, but instead he recorded it for the album Nattens drottning from 1989.

== Dansband standard ==
In the springtime of 1989, the song was recorded by Canyons orkester for Mariann Grammofon, (number: tmcs045). The song also topped Skånetoppen in 1990. In 1990, it was also recorded by Trastinis (B-side). A live recording by Stefan Borsch orkester on the 1990 video album Te' dans me' Stefan Borsch orkester was also done.

In 1991, Black Jack scored a major hit with the song, releasing it as a single in 1990, with "I ett lusthus" as B-side. It was also recorded for the 1990 movie soundtrack album Black Jack in 1990 from the film Blackjack and for the film with the same name.

In 1991, Kikki Danielsson recorded the song on the album "Vägen hem till dej", and Drifters with Marie Arturén recorded it as a B-side for the single "Säg varför". Leif Norbergs (single) and Mats Bergmans also recorded the song in the same year, as did Contrazt, Tottes and Cheeries, while Christie recorded it in the following year.

In 2001, Halländers recorded the song.

At Dansbandskampen 2008 the song was used during the finals, and performed by Larz-Kristerz and Scotts, where Larz Kristerz won. Scotts performed the song using an acoustic arrangement, which in 2009 was on the album Längtan. It was also recorded by CC & Lee for the album Gåva till dig in 2009.

At Dansbandskampen 2010, the song was performed by Jeppez & the Cowboys. Before the penultimate program the song was performed, outside any competition, by Elisas, Patrik's Combo and Willez.

== Other recordings ==
- Black Ingvars recorded a 1995 recording at "Inget stoppar oss nu" on the album "Earcandy Six", and the same year Flintstens med Stanley also recorded the song.
- At Körslaget 2009 the song was performed by Stefan Nykvist's choir from Älvdalen.
- Anne-Lie Rydé recorded the song on the 2010 album Dans på rosor.
- Ellen Krauss recorded the song on the 2023 album Så mycket bättre.
