= Ljudet av ditt hjärta =

Studio album by Drifters
- Released: August 19, 2009
- Genre: dansband music, schlager
- Length: 48.56
- Label: Kavalkad
- Producer: Kent Liljefjäll, Martin Klaman

Drifters chronology
| Tycker om dig: Svängiga låtar från förr (2008) | Ljudet av ditt hjärta (2009) | Stanna hos mig (2010) |

Ljudet av ditt hjärta is a 2009 studio album by Swedish band the Drifters.

The album consists of several Kikki Danielsson references, with cover versions of songs like "Nashville, Tennessee" and "Öppna vatten". Even "Islands in the Stream" (as "Öar i ett hav"), "You Don't Have to Say You Love Me" ("Io che non vivo senza te") and "Walk on By" had been recorded by Kikki Danielsson earlier.

== Track listing ==
| # | Title | Writer | Length |
|---|---|---|---|
| 1. | "Jag älskar dig" | Mats Tärnfors | 3.39 |
| 2. | "Ljudet av ditt hjärta" | Thomas G:son, Henrik Sethsson | 3.38 |
| 3. | "Ring ring" | Benny Andersson, Björn Ulvaeus, Stikkan Anderson | 2.56 |
| 4. | "Öar i ett hav" ("Islands in the Stream"), with Kjelle Danielsson from Jannez | Barry Gibb, Maurice Gibb, Robin Gibb, Swedish language-lyrics by Ingela "Pling" Forsman | 3.58 |
| 5. | "För den du är" | Bobby Ljunggren/Sonja Aldén/Fredrik Kempe | 3.06 |
| 6. | "Kan man kyssa" | Kent Liljefjäll, Magnus Persson | 3.13 |
| 7. | "Lev livet med mig" | Thomas G:son, Henrik Sethsson | 3.27 |
| 8. | "Nashville, Tennessee" | Lasse Holm, Ingela "Pling" Forsman | 3.08 |
| 9. | "Himmelen för mig" | Kent Liljefjäll, Magnus Persson, Ulf Georgsson | 3.23 |
| 10. | "En chans till" | Thomas G:sson, Henrik Sethsson | 3.07 |
| 11. | "You Don't Have to Say You Love Me" ("Io che non vivo senza te") | Simon Napier-Bell, Vicki Wickham, Pino Donaggio, Vito Pallavicini | 3.36 |
| 12. | "Öppna vatten" | Pierre Breidensjö, Jörgen Johsnsson | 2.48 |
| 13. | "Mitt hjärta brinner än" | Kent Liljefjäll, Marcus Persson, Ulf Georgsson | 3.09 |
| 14. | "Walk on By" | Kendal Hayes | 3.36 |
| 15. | "Så länge vi har varann" | Kent Liljefjäll, Bobby Ljunggren, Ulf Georgsson | 3.10 |

== Drifters ==
- Mattias – drums
- Ronny – guitar
- Erica – vocals and saxophone
- Stellan – keyboards
- Kent – bass
- Production, arrangement and mixed by: Kent Liljefjäll and Martin Klaman
- A & R: Pär Winberg
- Mastering: Uffe Börjesson, Earhear
- Design: Johan Lindberg
- Photo: Thomas Harrysson
- Cosmetics: Kia Wennberg
- Hair: Micke Gardell
- Coordination: Fredrik Järnberg

== Charts ==
| Chart (2009) | Peak position |
|---|---|
| Sweden (Sverigetopplistan) | 3 |
