= Ett liv med dig (album) =

Studio album by Drifters
- Released: November 7, 2007
- Recorded: May–September 2007
- Studio: Sing 2 Music Studio, Wet Room Studio, Sweden
- Genre: Dansband music, schlager
- Label: Frituna
- Producer: Kent Liljefjäll, Martin Klaman

Drifters chronology
Kärlek är inget spel (2006)	Ett liv med dig (2007)	Tycker om dig: Svängiga låtar från förr (2008)

Ett liv med dig is a 2007 album by Swedish band the Drifters. The album peaked at 31st position at the Swedish album chart.

On the album, songs are written by songwriters like Thomas G:son, Calle Kindbom, Anders Glenmark, Calle Lösnitz, Ulf Georgsson and Lasse Holm. The song "Love is in Your Eyes" is performed by the band's main vocalist Erika Sjöström as a duet with Casper Janebrink from Arvingarna. The album also consists of recordings of songs like "Ännu en dag", performed by Anne-Lie Rydé, at Melodifestivalen 2005, as well as the Ann-Louise Hanson song "Don't Slam the Door".

== Track listing ==
#	Title	Writer
1.	"Ett liv med dig"	Mats Larsson, Ulf Georgsson
2.	"Vem kan älska dig som jag"	Ulf Georgsson, Stefan Brunzell, Tony Johansson
3.	"Lova mig"	Thomas G:son
4.	"Love is in Your Eyes" (duet Erica Sjöström-Casper Janebrink)	Casper Janebrink, Kalle Kindbom, Carl Lösnitz
5.	"Jag vill sjunga ut min glädje"	Frank Wisur, Hanne Sommernes, Mikael Wendt, Christer Lundh
6.	"Vart vi än går"	Tomas Berglund, Patrik Svensson, Ulf Georgsson
7.	"Sunny Day"	J. Andersson, J. Petersson
8.	"Jag kan minnas"	Kent Liljefjäll, Jonas Näslund
9.	"Låt kärleken få födas"	Mats Larsson, Åsa Karlström
10.	"Don't Slam the Door"	Anders Glenmark, Tomas Minor
11.	"Låt oss kasta loss"	Leif "Mulle" Melander, Peter Nord
12.	"Så nära"	Thomas G:son, Anne-Lie Rydé
13.	"Ännu en dag"	Lasse Holm, Ingela "Pling" Forsman

== Charts ==
Chart (2007)	Peak position
Sweden (Sverigetopplistan)	31
