= Kärlek är inget spel =

Studio album by Drifters
- Released: 2006
- Recorded: Sing2music studio, Lidköping, Sweden
- Genre: dansband music, schlager
- Length: 42 minutes
- Label: Scranta

Drifters chronology
Träum dich zu mir (2004)	Kärlek är inget spel (2006)	Ett liv med dig (2007)

Kärlek är inget spel is a 2006 studio album by Swedish band the Drifters.

== Track listing ==
1. Kärlek är inget spel (Björn Alriksson, Ann Persson)
2. Om du ringer till mig (Thomas G:son)
3. Förgät mig ej] (Forget Me Not) (Paul Evans, Al Byron, Alf Robertson)
4. Jag ville ta ner stjärnorna (Nick Borgen)
5. I Only Want to Be with You (Mike Hawker, Ivor Raymonde)
6. För alltid (Erica Sjöström, Kent Liljefjäll, Roberto Mårdstam)
7. Komma hem (Björn Alriksson, Ann Persson)
8. När du ser på mig (Billy Heil)
9. Allt vi har e' varann (Henrik Sethsson)
10. Tell Him (Bert Russell)
11. Förälskad, förlorad (Björn Alriksson, Ann Persson)
12. Har du glömt (Ulf Georgsson, Stefan Brunzell)
13. Crying (Roy Orbison, Joe Melson)
