= Körslaget 2009 =

Season of television series

- Körslaget 2009-contestants (datum gäller kvällen för utröstning)
- 2009
Ola Svensson	Winner
Stefan Nykvist	14 November
Roger Pontare	7 November
Amy Diamond	31 October
Caroline af Ugglas	24 October
Rodrigo Pencheff	17 October
Andreas Lundstedt	10 October

This article appears to be about something which has relevance to happenings in some unspecified country. It should be more explanatory (Sweden perhaps?).

Körslaget 2009 is the third season of TV4's entertainment show Körslaget. It premiered on 3 October. The show's host is the same as the other seasons'; Gry Forssell.

== Competitors ==
- Rodrigo Pencheff With a Choir From Rinkeby
- Caroline af Ugglas With a Choir From Upplands-Bro
- Stefan Nykvist With a Choir From Älvdalen
- Ola Svensson With a Choir From Lund
- Andreas Lundstedt With a Choir From Uppsala
- Amy Diamond With a Choir From Jönköping
- Roger Pontare With a Choir From Lycksele

=== Program 1 ===
Aired 3 October 2009

1. Team Andreas - Disco Inferno (The Trammps)
2. Team Amy - Baby Goodbye (E.M.D.)
3. Team Stefan - Jag ringer på fredag (Sven-Ingvars)
4. Team Caroline - The Ketchup Song (Las Ketchup)
5. Team Ola - Viva la Vida (Coldplay)
6. Team Rigo - I Know You Want Me (Calle Ocho) (Pitbull)
7. Team Pontare - Pride, In the Name of Love (U2)

==== Top 3 ====
Highest number of votes
Team Stefan	Team Amy	Team Pontare

No choir was eliminated

=== Program 2 ===
Aired 10 October 2009

1. Team Pontare - Go West (Village People/Pet Shop Boys)
2. Team Rigo - La Bamba (Ritchie Valens)
3. Team Amy - Fairytale (Alexander Rybak)
4. Team Ola - Theme from New York, New York (Frank Sinatra)
5. Team Andreas - Poker Face (Lady Gaga)
6. Team Caroline - 800 grader (Ebba Grön)
7. Team Stefan - Inget stoppar oss nu (Black Jack)

==== Elimination ====
The Choir with the darkest shade of gray was eliminated.

Fewest votes
Team Andreas	Team Rigo

=== Episode 3 ===
Aired 17 October

1. Team Stefan - Sweet Child o' Mine (Guns N' Roses)
2. Team Caroline - Snälla, snälla (Caroline af Ugglas)
3. Team Ola - Natalie (Ola Svensson)
4. Team Rigo - I Got U (Rigo and the Topaz sound feat. Red Fox)
5. Team Pontare - När vindarna viskar mitt namn (Roger Pontare)
6. Team Amy - Thank You (Amy Diamond)

==== Elimination ====
The Choir with the darkest shade of gray was eliminated.

Fewest votes
Team Rigo	Team Amy

=== Episode 4 ===
Aired 24 October

==== Round 1 ====
1. Team Amy - Thank You (Katrina and the Waves)
2. Team Stefan - Gråt inga tårar (Thorleifs)
3. Team Ola - Angels (Robbie Williams)
4. Team Caroline - Should I Stay or Should I Go (The Clash)
5. Team Pontare - I Get Around (The Beach Boys)

==== Round 2 ====
1. Team Amy - Money money (ABBA)
2. Team Stefan - Hooked on a feeling (Björn Skifs)
3. Team Ola - It's raining men (The Weather Girls)
4. Team Caroline - Don't worry be happy (Bobby McFerrin)
5. Team Pontare - We will rock you (Queen)

==== Elimination ====
The Choir with the darkest shade of gray was eliminated.

Fewest votes
Team Caroline	Team Stefan

=== Episode 5 ===
Aired 31 October

==== Round 1 ====
1. Team Pontare - Hot, hot, hot (Buster Poindexter/The Cure)
2. Team Stefan - Du är min man (Helen Sjöholm)
3. Team Amy - Higher and higher (Jackie Wilson)
4. Team Ola - As long as you love me (Backstreet Boys)

==== Round 2 ====
1. Team Pontare - Take My Breath Away (Top Gun)
2. Team Stefan - You Never Can Tell (Pulp Fiction)
3. Team Amy - What a Feeling (Flashdance)
4. Team Ola - Lady Marmalade (Moulin Rouge!)

==== Elimination ====
The Choir with the darkest shade of gray was eliminated.

Fewest votes
Team Amy	Team Ola

=== Episode 6 ===
Aired 7 November

==== Round 1 ====
1. Team Stefan - Det börjar verka kärlek, banne mig (Claes-Göran Hederström)
2. Team Ola - When you say nothing at all (Ronan Keating)
3. Team Pontare - Uptown girl (Billy Joel/Westlife)

==== Round 2 ====
1. Team Stefan - Enter sandman (Metallica)
2. Team Ola - Leende guldbruna ögon (Vikingarna)
3. Team Pontare - I kissed a girl (Katy Perry)

==== Elimination ====
The Choir with the darkest shade of gray was eliminated.

Fewest votes
Team Pontare

=== Program 7 - The Finale ===
Aired 14 November

Team Stefan:

1. Eloise (Arvingarna)
2. Enter sandman (Metallica)
3. Caruso (Pavarotti/Paul Potts)

Team Ola:

1. All by myself (Celine Dion)
2. It's raining men (The Weather Girls)
3. Caruso (Pavarotti/Paul Potts)

Duel:

1. Bumble Bee

==== Final results ====
The Choir in green were declared the winners

Winner
Team Ola

== Elimination chart ==
Finals
Weeks:		3 October	10 October	17 October	24 October	31 October	7 November	14 November
Place	Contestant	Result						
1	Ola Svensson	SAFE	SAFE	SAFE	SAFE	Btm 2	SAFE	Winner
2	Stefan Nyqvist	Top 3	SAFE	SAFE	Btm 2	SAFE	SAFE	Runner-up
3	Roger Pontare	Top 3	SAFE	SAFE	SAFE	SAFE	ELIM	
4	Amy Diamond	Top 3	SAFE	Btm 2	SAFE	ELIM		
5	Caroline af Ugglas	SAFE	SAFE	SAFE	ELIM			
6	Rodrigo Pencheff	SAFE	Btm 2	ELIM				
7	Andreas Lundstedt	SAFE	ELIM					
