= Gåva till dig =

Studio album by CC & Lee
- Released: 25 February 2009
- Recorded: Yla Studios
- Genre: dansband pop, schlager
- Length: 43 minutes
- Label: Lionheart International
- Producer: Amir Aly

Gåva till dig is a studio album by CC & Lee, released on 25 February 2009.

== Track listing ==
#	Title	Writer
1.	"Förlorad utan dig"	Amir Aly, Maciel Numhauser, Robin Abrahamsson
2.	"Himlen kan vänta"	Kalle Kindbom, Thomas G:sson
3.	"Ingenting är större"	Kalle Kindbom, Mats Tärnfors
4.	"Kan du se genom tårarna"	Persson, Kent Liljefjäll, Ulf Georgsson
5.	"Leende guldbruna ögon" ("Beautiful Brown Eyes")	Alton Delmore, Simon Arthur, Olle Bergman
6.	"Alltid inom mig" ("Always on My Mind")	Johnny Christopher, Mark James, Wayne Carson Thompson, Dan Hylander
7.	"Gåva till mig"	Calle Kindbom, Hollberg, Johansson
8.	"You're the Inspiration"	Peter Cetera, David Foster
9.	"Jag ger dig allt"	Cecilia Furlong
10.	"Hav till land"	Lena Ström
11.	"Inget stoppar oss nu"	Lasse Holm, Ingela Forsman
12.	"I Will Always Love You"	Dolly Parton

== Chart positions ==
Chart (2009)	Peak position
Sweden (Sverigetopplistan)	9
