= Stanna hos mig =

Studio album by Drifters
- Released: August 25, 2010
- Recorded: 2010
- Genre: dansband music, schlager
- Length: 45.01
- Label: Mariann
- Producer: Henrik Sethson

Drifters chronology
Ljudet av ditt hjärta (2009)	Stanna hos mig (2010)	Hoppas på det bästa (2011)

Stanna hos mig is a 2010 studio album by Swedish band Drifters, mostly consisting of older cover songs.

== Track listing ==
#	Title	Writer	Length
1.	"Sha-la-lie"	Pierre Kartner, Ulf Georgsson	3.00
2.	"Där du går lämnar kärleken spår" ("Love Grows (Where My Rosemary Goes)")	Tony MacAulay, Bary Mason, Olle Bergman	2.45
3.	"Stanna hos mig"	Henrik Sethman, Mats Tärnfors	3.32
4.	"Morning Train" ("9 to 5")	Florrie Palmer	3.19
5.	"Det är kärlek"	Jonas Warnerbring, Susanne Wigforss	3.00
6.	"Tack för en underbar vanlig dag "	Agnetha Fältskog, Bosse Carlgren	2.42
7.	"It Takes Two" (duet with Olle Jönsson from Lasse Stefanz)	William Stevenson, Sylvia Moy	4.05
8.	"Ska vi plocka körsbär i min trädgård"	Little Gerhard	2.45
9.	"Manic Monday"	Prince Roger Nelson	2.57
10.	"Världens rikaste flicka"	John Lawrence Fineran, Rune Wallebom	3.00
11.	"Det finaste jag vet"	Henrik Sethsson, Ulf Georgsson	3.28
12.	"Är det konstigt att man längtar bort nå'n gång" ("I'm Gonna Be a Country Girl Again")	Buffy Sainte-Marie, Stikkan Anderson	3.15
13.	"Just Like a Woman"	Lasse Holm	4.10
14. (bonus track)	"In a Moment Like This" (duet with Henrik Strömberg from Scotts)	Thomas G:son, Henrik Sethsson, Erik Bernholm	3.01

== Drifters ==
- Erica Sjöström – vocals, saxophone & accordion
- Mattias Berghorn – drums, vocals
- Ronny Nilsson – guitar, vocals
- Stellan Hedevik – keyboard
- Henrik Wallrin – bass
- Production and arrangement: Henrik Sethson
- A & R: Jakob Ekendahl

Mixed by: Plec in Panic-Room. mastered by Dragan Tanasković

- Photo: Thomas Harrysson
- Design: Anders Bühlund, Forma
- Drifters engaged through: YBM Nöjesproduktion, Alingsås

== Charts ==
Chart (2010)	Peak position
Sweden (Sverigetopplistan)	3
