= Hoppas på det bästa =

Studio album by Drifters
- Released: 24 October 2011
- Genre: dansband music
- Length: 36 minutes
- Label: Warner Music Sweden
- Producer: Henrik Sethson

Drifters chronology
Stanna hos mig (2010)	Hoppas på det bästa (2011)	Jukebox (2013)

Hoppas på det bästa is a 2011 studio album by Swedish band Drifters.

== Track listing ==
1. Hoppas på det bästa (Mats Tärnfors/Marika Lindén)
2. Kom tillbaks (Henrik Sethson/Mats Tärnfors/Ulf Georgsson)
3. Nina, fina Ballerina (Benny Andersson/Björn Ulvaeus)
4. Pack Up (Tim Woodcock/Eliza Doolittle/Felix Powell/George Asaf/Matthew Prime)
5. Hallå, jag ringer på (Thomas Berglund/Ulf Georgsson/Per Samuelsson)
6. Xanadu (Jeff Lynne)
7. Adios, Goodbye (Henrik Sethson/Mats Tärnfors/Ulf Georgsson)
8. En man i byrån (If You Can Put That in a Bottle) (Wilbur Meshel/Peter Himmelstrand)
9. Sun Street (Vinzente de la Cruz)
10. The Things You Do (Henrik Sethson/Thomas G:sson)
11. Om hela världen sjöng en sång (Roger Greenway/William Backer/Raquel Davis/Roger Cook /Lennart Reuterskiöld)
12. September (Anders Wigelius/Ulf Georgsson)

== Charts ==
Chart (2011–2012)	Peak position
Swedish Albums (Sverigetopplistan)	6
