= Gila Bergqvist =

Swedish producer, television presenter, and actress

Gila Helena Bergqvist Ulfung (born Hasson, 28 November 1967) is a Swedish producer, television presenter and actress. She is best known for her role in the Ronny and Ragge series Byhåla which was broadcast on SVT from 1991 to 1993.

Gila Hasson was born in Brännkyrka, Stockholm.
