= Jukebox (Drifters album) =

Studio album by Drifters
- Released: 21 August 2013
- Genre: dansband music
- Length: 36 minutes
- Label: Parlophone Music Sweden, Frituna

Drifters chronology
Hoppas på det bästa (2011)	Jukebox (2013)	Blå blå känslor (2014)

Jukebox is a 2013 studio album by Swedish band Drifters.

== Track listing ==
1. Vacation (Hank Hunton, Gary Waston, Connie Francis)
2. Säger du nej? (Henrik Sethson, Ulf Georgsson)
3. Jukebox (Uffe Börjesson, Calle Kindbom, Dick Karlsson)
4. 1:a gången (Magnus Uggla, Anders Henriksson)
5. Please Mr. Postman (Brian Holland, Robert Bateman, Freddie Gorman)
6. En tuff brud i lyxförpackning (Simon Brehm, Sven Paddock, Gösta Stevens)
7. Det måste gå (Henrik Sethson, Mikael Wigström)
8. Livet kommer inte i repris (Mats Tärnfors, Marica Lindé)
9. Det blir alltid som du vill (Mats Tärnfors, Marica Lindé)
10. Det är vi (Henrik Sethson, Calle Kindbom)
11. I goda vänners lag (Peter Samuelsson, Thomas Berglund, Håkan Swärd)
12. Ingen i världen som du (Henrik Sethsson, Thomas Berglund, Ulf Georgsson)

== Charts ==
Chart (2013)	Peak position
Swedish Albums (Sverigetopplistan)	2
