= En helt ny dag =

Studio album by Fernandoz
- Released: February 13, 2008
- Recorded: Skara, Sweden November–December 2007
- Genre: dansband music
- Length: 46 minutes
- Label: Warner Music Sweden

Fernandoz chronology
Minnenas allé (2005)	En helt ny dag (2008)	På väg igen (2009)

En helt ny dag is a studio album by Fernandoz, released on 13 February 2008.

== Track listing ==
1. En helt ny dag (Mats Larsson, Åsa Karlström)
2. Under himmel och över öppet hav (Papa I Wish You Wouldn't Go) (Lasse Holm, Mats Rådberg)
3. Nej, så tjock du har blitt (William Kristoffersen, Anders Nordlund)
4. Jag är ingen utan dig (Hans Backström, Peter Bergqvist, Per Arne Thigerberg)
5. Under himmel och över öppet hav (Hank B. Marvin, Bruce Welch, Brian Bennett, John Rostill, Hans Sidén)
6. Vår egen bröllopsdag (Elisabeth Lord, Mats Björklund, Harald Steinhauer)
7. Säg att du älskar mig än (Carl-Henry Kindbom, Carl Lösnitz)
8. A Big Bunk of Love (Aaron Schroeder, Sid Wyche)
9. På en gata utan namn (One Way Street) (Arvid Berge, Åsa Karlström, Angela Lidin)
10. Sju ensamma kvällar (Earl Shuman, Marshall Brown, Lennart Reuterskiöld)
11. Åren kommer och går (Peter Andree, Stefan Lengstrand, Ulf Georgsson)
12. Splish Splash (Bobby Darin, Jean Murray)
13. Jag är ingen utan dig (Peter Bergqvist, Hans Backström)
14. Varje gang jag ser dig (Adam Nordén, Markus Bergkvist)
15. Det skrivs så många vackra ord om kärleken (Magnus Andersson, Britt Lindeborg)

== Charts ==
Chart (2008)	Peak position
Swedish Albums (Sverigetopplistan)	6
