= Dansbandskampen =

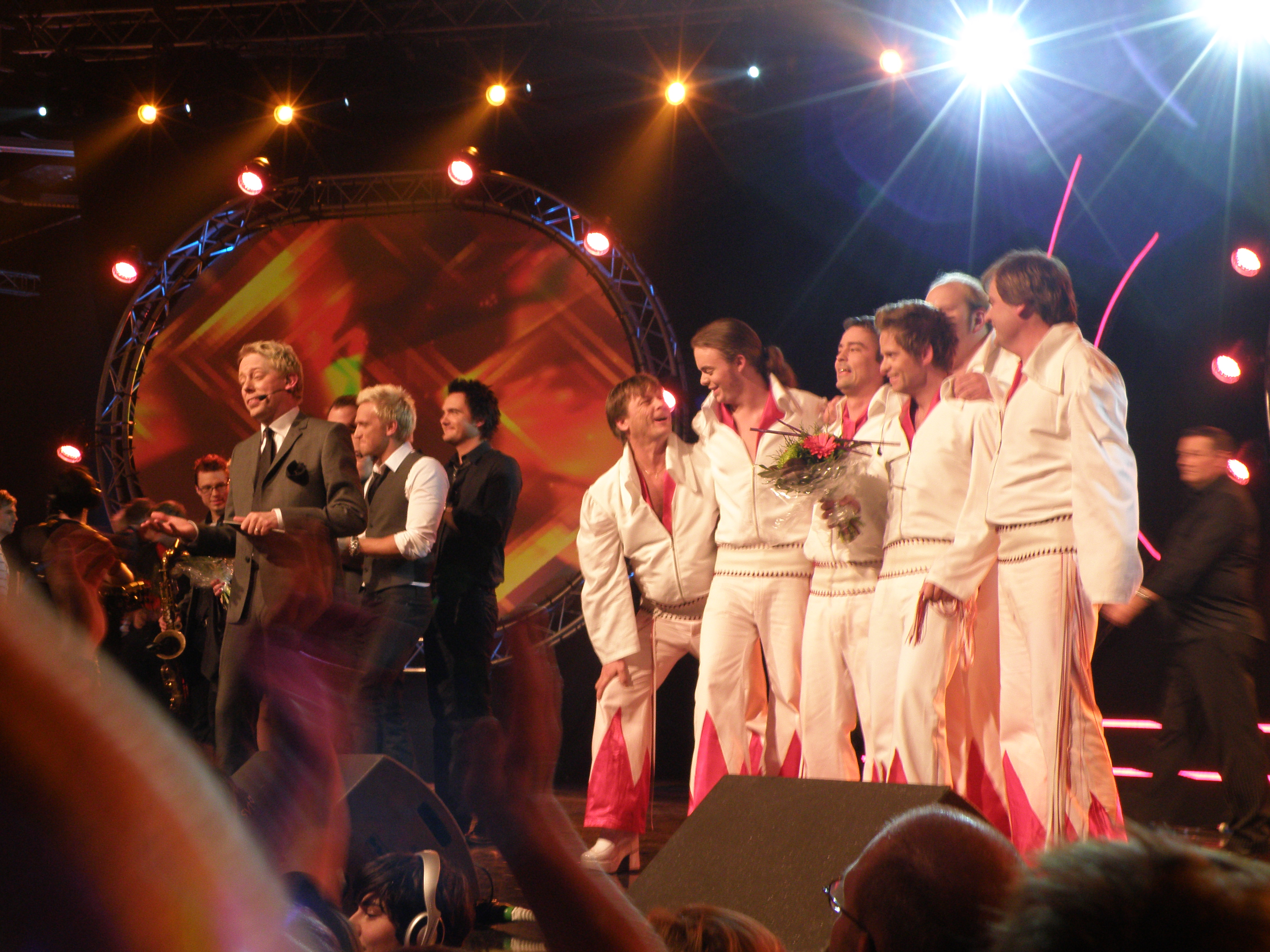
- Dansbandskampen 2008
- Presented by: Peter Settman (2008-09); Christine Meltzer (2010)
- No. of seasons: 3

Original release
- Network: SVT
- Release: 18 October 2008 – 11 December 2010

Dansbandskampen is a television show established by Peter Settman and his production company Baluba. Peter Settman is also the show host. The show is broadcast over Sveriges Television, with season 1 airing October–December 2008.

In 2008, five bands participated each week. Each week consisted of one moment where the bands were free to perform a pop or rock song, followed up by the second moment, Dansbandsklassikern ("The dansband classic"), where a famous dansband song was performed, chosen by drawing. The finalist bands are given an own, new own-produced song, followed up by the two remaining bands performing their own version of a song.

There are discussions of spreading the concept outside Sweden, with a disco/folk music version in Poland and a country music version in the United States.

== Seasons ==
=== Season 1 ===
- 2008, Larz-Kristerz winners with Scotts as runner-up.

=== Season 2 ===
- 2009, The Playtones winners with Titanix as runner-up.

=== Season 3 ===
- 2010, Elisa's winners before Willez and CC & Lee.

== See also ==
- Dansbandslåten
