= Gry Forssell =

Swedish radio and television host (born 1973)

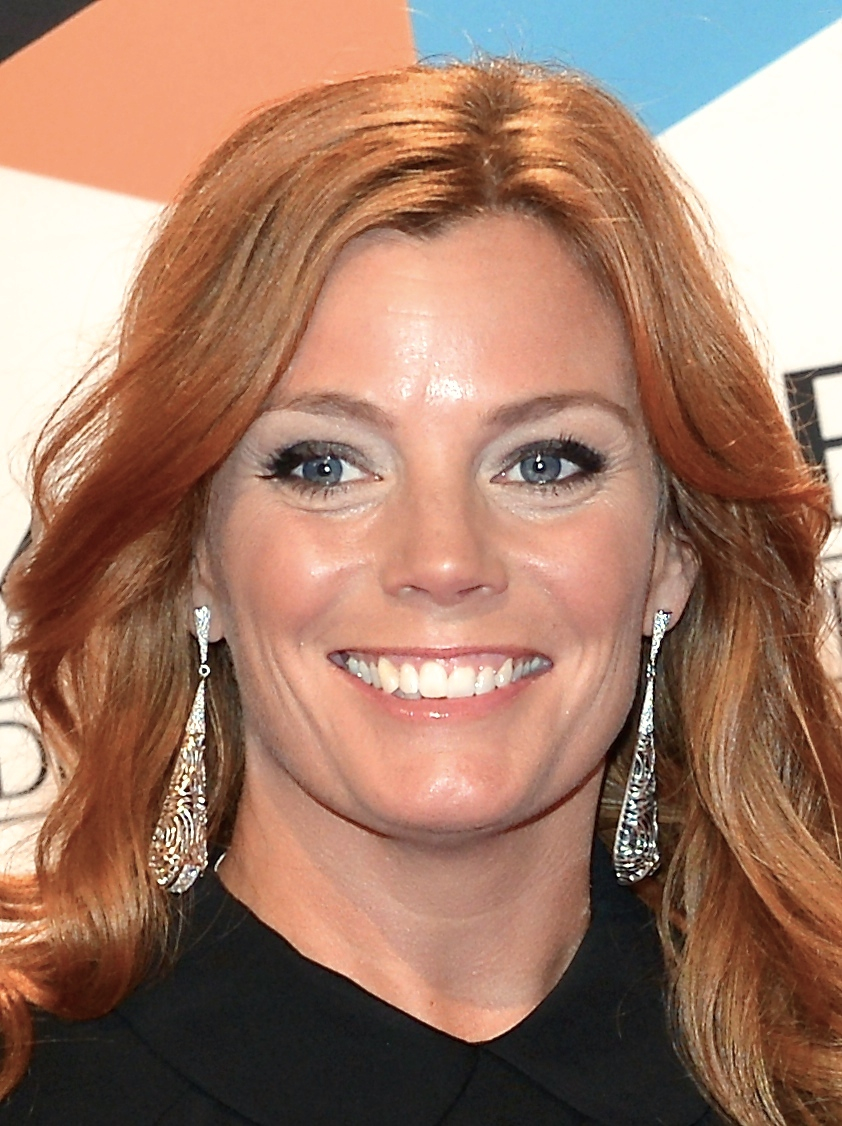
- Forsell in 2013
- Born: February 16, 1973 (age 52); Växjö, Sweden
- Occupations: Television host, Radio talk-show host

Gry Charlotta Forssell (born February 16, 1973) is a Swedish television host on TV4 and TV3 and radio talk-show host. She is the daughter of singer Tomas Forssell and niece to actor Johannes Brost.

== Early life and career ==
Forssell grew up in Luleå and studied at the Child and youth education in high school. After graduating in 1992 she became television presenter for SVT's youth section in Växjö, along with Pernilla Månsson Colt and Per Dahlberg and they presented the shows PM and Pickup. She also acted in Ronny och Ragge as the character Bettan, a girl working the hot dog stand in Byhåla. Forssell is an honorary member of Luleå Hockey and has a Luleå Hockey shirt hanging at her workplace studio at her radiostation Mix Megapol.

After the work on SVT she presented the film show Filmguiden at TV1000, the horse show Vinnare med V75 and På Plats both on TV4. She also presented Sommartoppen on Sveriges Radio between 1994 and 1999, and the lifestyle show Silikon along with Ulrika Eriksson between 1998 and 2001 on TV3.

In 2004, Forssell became a radio talkshow presenter for Mix Megapol. She presented the morning radio show Äntligen Morgon along with Anders Timell. The morningshow won Radioakademins award for "Morningshow of the year" in 2005 and again in 2008. Forsell and Adam Alsing presented the quiz show Pokerfejs broadcast on TV4 in 2007, and since 2008 Forsell is presenting the choir song show Körslaget also broadcast on TV4. Forsell presented Big Brother in 2011 and 2012 when it was broadcast on TV11.

== Radio and TV shows ==
- Byhåla 2 (SVT, 1992)
- PM (SVT, 1992–93)
- Pickup (SVT, 1993)
- Filmguiden (TV1000, 1995)
- På plats (TV4, 1995)
- Äventyr (SVT, 1997)
- Silikon (TV3, 1998–2001)
- Jakten på ökenguldet (tävlande) (TV3, 1999)
- Fångarna på fortet (TV3, 1999–2000)
- Vilda djur (TV3, 2001)
- Harem (TV3, 2002)
- Prestanda (TV3, 2003)
- Izabellas bröllop (TV3, 2004)
- Morgonradioshowen "Äntligen morgon med Adam & Gry" (Mix Megapol, 2004–present)
- Rampfeber (TV4, 2006)
- Sommarkrysset (TV4, 2006–08)
- Högsta domstolen (SVT, 2006) (guest)
- Vinterkrysset (TV4, 2006)
- Pokerfejs (TV4, 2007)
- Grammisgalan (TV4, 2008)
- Körslaget (TV4, 2008)
- Gladiatorerna (TV4, 2012–present)
- Big Brother (TV11, 2011–12)
