= Peter Settman =

Swedish actor, comedian, television presenter, screenwriter, and television producer

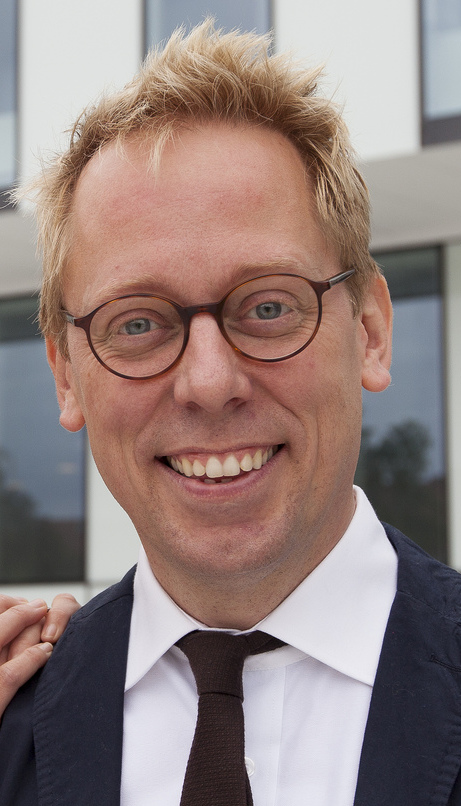
- Settman in 2012
- Born: 24 February 1969 (age 56); Aspudden, Sweden
- Occupation(s): Television presenter, actor, comedian
- Spouse(s): Anna Settman (m. 2007–2019); Carmen Navis (m. 2023-)
- Partner: Sara Carlsson

Peter Settman (born 24 February 1969) is a Swedish actor, comedian, television presenter, screenwriter, and television producer. Settman is known for his appearances on the comedy shows Byhåla (featuring the characters Ronny and Ragge), Så ska det låta and Dansbandskampen.

== Early life ==
Settman was raised by his mother in Sätra. He is an only child born to parents Gunnar Törnstrand and Marianne Settman, both of whom never married each other. His father died of cancer when he was fourteen years old.

== Education and career ==
Settman started acting in Skärholmen at the age of ten and studied at Södra Latin along with eventual Ronny and Ragge actors Fredde Granberg and Gila Bergqvist. At age 21 he acted in skits in the youth television show Kosmopol on local television in Växjö. In 1989 Settman started his production company Baluba.

Ronny och Ragge was one of Settman's most prominent shows. Settman played Ronny to Granberg's Ragge; the duo was depicted as typical raggare. The characters were introduced in a parody of a popular soap opera, Storstad, and became an instant hit. Settman and Granberg featured on their own show called Byhåla, which was broadcast on Sveriges Television from 1991 to 1993. Upon the suggestion of Swedish musician Christer Sandelin, Ronny and Ragge released their own album with lyrics set to Sandelin's music, which sold 138,000 copies.

Settman and Granberg co-starred in shows such as Megafon, Äntligen Måndag, Stereo and Bara med Bruno. They went their separate ways in the late 1990s. In 2001 Settman acted in the TV4 show En ängels tålamod, where he played the character Gabriel. In 2004, he presented Melodifestivalen 2004, and became Melodifestivalen 2005's producer the following year. In 2006, he started presenting Så ska det låta (That's the Spirit!) on SVT and Sommarkrysset in 2005 on TV4. Between late 2008 and early 2009, he presented Dansbandskampen on Sveriges Television. During the winter of 2013-2014, he presented the talk show Settman på plats on Sveriges Television.

== Personal life ==
Settman has two sons, Oscar and Elis, by his former partner, Sara Carlsson, and two sons, Simon and Eric, by his first wife, Anna. He resides in the Östermalm district of Stockholm.

Settman married production designer Carmen Navis on October 14, 2023 in the Apulia region of Italy.

== Television and film ==
- Tulpanmysteriet
- Halloj Holland
- 1985:August Strindberg ett liv (TV)
- 1991: Kosmopol, SVT
- 1991:Sommarlov SVT
- 1991:Gerilla TV - Laijv SVT
- Megafon SVT
- Stereo (Tratten och Finkel) SVT
- 1994–95: Äntligen måndag/Egäntligen måndag
- Snutarna
- 1999:Browalls
- 2000:The Road to El Dorado (Swedish voice)
- 2001:En ängels tålamod
- 2004:Melodifestivalen
- 2005:Melodifestivalen
- 2005:Sommarkrysset
- 2006:Så ska det låta
- 2007:Playa del Sol (director, season 1)
- 2007–2010: Svenska Idrottsgalan
- 2008:Dansbandskampen 2008
- 2009:Dansbandskampen 2009
- 2010:Minuten
- 2012:Idéfabriken
- 2013:Settman På Plats
