= En tuff brud i lyxförpackning =

Song by Lill-Babs
- Language: Swedish
- Released: 1961
- Genre: schlager
- Songwriters: Simon Brehm, Sven Paddock och Gösta Stevens

"En tuff brud i lyxförpackning" is a song written by Simon Brehm, Sven Paddock and Gösta Stevens, and originally recorded by Lill-Babs. Her version was released in August 1961 with the film Svenska Floyd.

The song also appeared on the 1976 Lill-Babs compilation album Gamla godingar (6).

Anne-Lie Rydé also recorded the song on her 1983 eponymous album., and her version was also released as a B-side for the single Segla på ett moln the same year.

In 2010, the song was recorded by Petter on the album Samlar ut den. during the 2010 edition of Så mycket bättre. Petter's version peaked at the No. 24 position on the Sverige charts in 2010.

In 2013, the song was recorded by Swedish band the Drifters on the album Jukebox.

In 2018, the singer Petra Marklund, also known September, performed a cover of the song as the interval act in the second semifinal of Melodifestivalen, Sweden's national final for the Eurovision Song Contest.
