= Tycker om dig: Svängiga låtar från förr =

Studio album by Drifters
- Released: August 26, 2008
- Genre: Dansband music, schlager
- Length: 38.27
- Label: Frituna
- Producer: Kent Liljefjäll, Martin Klaman

Drifters chronology
Ett liv med dig (2007)	Tycker om dig: Svängiga låtar från förr (2008)	Ljudet av ditt hjärta (2009)

Tycker om dig: Svängiga låtar från förr is a 2008 studio album by Swedish band the Drifters, mostly consisting of cover versions of songs from the 1950s, 60s and 70s. The album peaked at second position at the Swedish albums chart, and in 2009 the album had sold gold.

== Track listing ==
#	Title	Writer	Length
1.	Jag önskar att det alltid vore sommar (It Might As Well Rain Until September)	Bengt Palmers, Bodil Olsson, Gerry Goffin, Carole King	3.28
2.	Kan ingen tala om för mig när tåget går? (Is Anybody Goin' to San Antone?)	Bengt Palmers, Dave Kirby, Glenn Martin	2.31
3.	Stand by Your Man	Tammy Wynette, Billy Sherrill	2.57
4.	På nian på lördag (Saturday Night at the Movies)	Green, Barry Mann, Cynthia Weil	2.56
5.	I've Told Ev'ry Little Star	Jerome Kern, Oscar Hammerstein	2.38
6.	Tycker om dig (Finalmente)	Britt Lindeborg, Ricky Gianco, Dante Pieretti, Gianni Sanjust	3.07
7.	Birds and Bees	Herb Newman	2.13
8.	Bobby's Girl	Henry Hoffman/Garry Klein	3.06
9.	När du tar mig i din famn	Agnetha Fältskog, Ingela "Pling" Forsman	3.52
10.	Trettifyran (This Ole House)	Olle Adolphson, Stuart Hambley	3.21
11.	They Don't Know About Us	Kirsty MacColl	3.00
12.	Making Love	Floyd Robinson	2.17
13.	Spara sista dansen (Save the Last Dance for Me)	Larsson, Doc Pomus, Mort Schuman	2.59

== Personnel ==
=== Drifters ===
- Erica Sjöström – vocals, saxophone
- Ronny Nilsson – guitar
- Stellan Hedevik – drums
- Kent Liljefjäll – bass
- Arrangement and production: Kent Liljefjäll and Martin Klaman
- Mastering: Uffe Börjesson, Earhear
- Photo: Thomas Harrysson
- A & R: Pär Winberg

== Charts ==
Chart (2008)	Peak position
Sweden	2
