= Det har jag ångrat tusenfalt =

Studio album by Drifters
- Released: February 2004
- Genre: dansband music, schlager
- Length: circa 41 minutes
- Label: Scranta

Drifters chronology
Om du vill ha mig (2001)	Det har jag ångrat tusenfalt (2004)	Träum dich zu mir (2004)

Det har jag ångrat tusenfalt is a 2004 studio album by Swedish band Drifters.

== Track listing ==
1. Det har jag ångrat tusenfalt (Björn Alriksson, Jan-Eric Karlzon, Ann Persson)
2. Låt aldrig natten ta slut (Jan-Eric Karlzon)
3. För din skull (Björn Alriksson, Ann Persson)
4. Det finns ingenting att hämta (Blame it on the Bossa Nova) (Barry Mann, Cynthia Weil, Stig Rossner)
5. Kan du förlåta (Z. Martinsson, Britt A. Nilsson)
6. Seven Years (Wolfgang Jass, Wolff-Eckehardt Stein)
7. Nu lifter vindarna (Tommy Gunnarsson, Elisabeth Lord)
8. Ännu en gång (Lars Sigfridsson)
9. Kommer tid, kommer råd (Tommy Gunnarsson, Elisabeth Lord)
10. Kärlekens låga (Lennart Dahlberg, Magnus Ekwall)
11. Ring till mig (Tommy Gunnarsson, Tommy Gunnarsson, Elisabeth Lord)
12. Komm heim (Peter Dahl, Thomas Holmstrand, Linda Jansson, Rudolf Müssig)
13. Jedes Mal wenn du fortgehst von mir (Björn Alriksson, Rudolf Müssig, Ann Persson)
