= Sommarkrysset =

Former Swedish television program (2005–2019)

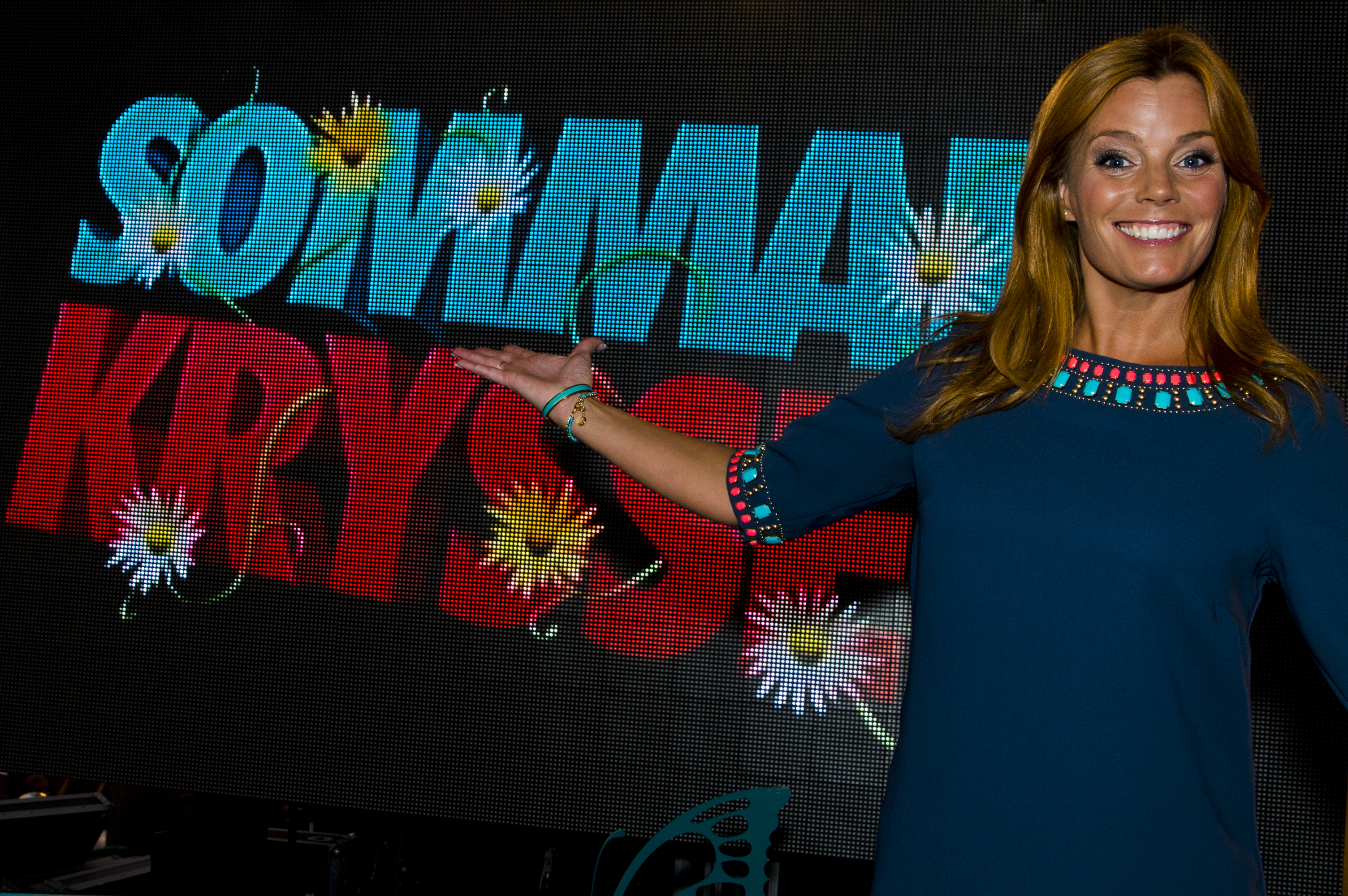
- Show host Gry Forssell
- Starring: Gry Forssell
- Country of origin: Sweden

Production
- Production company: Baluba AB

Original release
- Network: SVT1 (2005); TV4 (2006–2019)
- Release: 3 June 2005 – 10 August 2019

Sommarkrysset (Swedish: [ˈsɔ̂mːarˌkrʏsːɛt], lit. 'The Summer Crossword Puzzle') was a Swedish television program that broadcast live from the Gröna Lund amusement park in Stockholm during the summer. It was first shown on 3 June 2005, and ran until 2019. The program was created by Peter Settman's Baluba Productions, and was produced by Settman's Baluba Television.

The show is known for its early bookings of music artists such as Lady Gaga, Dua Lipa, Rita Ora, Jason Mraz, and Ava Max, all of whom later went on to gain global success.

The program consisted of live performances by music artists in front of a live audience, while viewers could call in and win a certain money after figuring out a word derived by entering the answers to questions (one letter in each box) on a piece of paper with squares, like a crossword.

A winter spin-off of the show called Vinterkrysset aired in 2006.

== Pictures ==
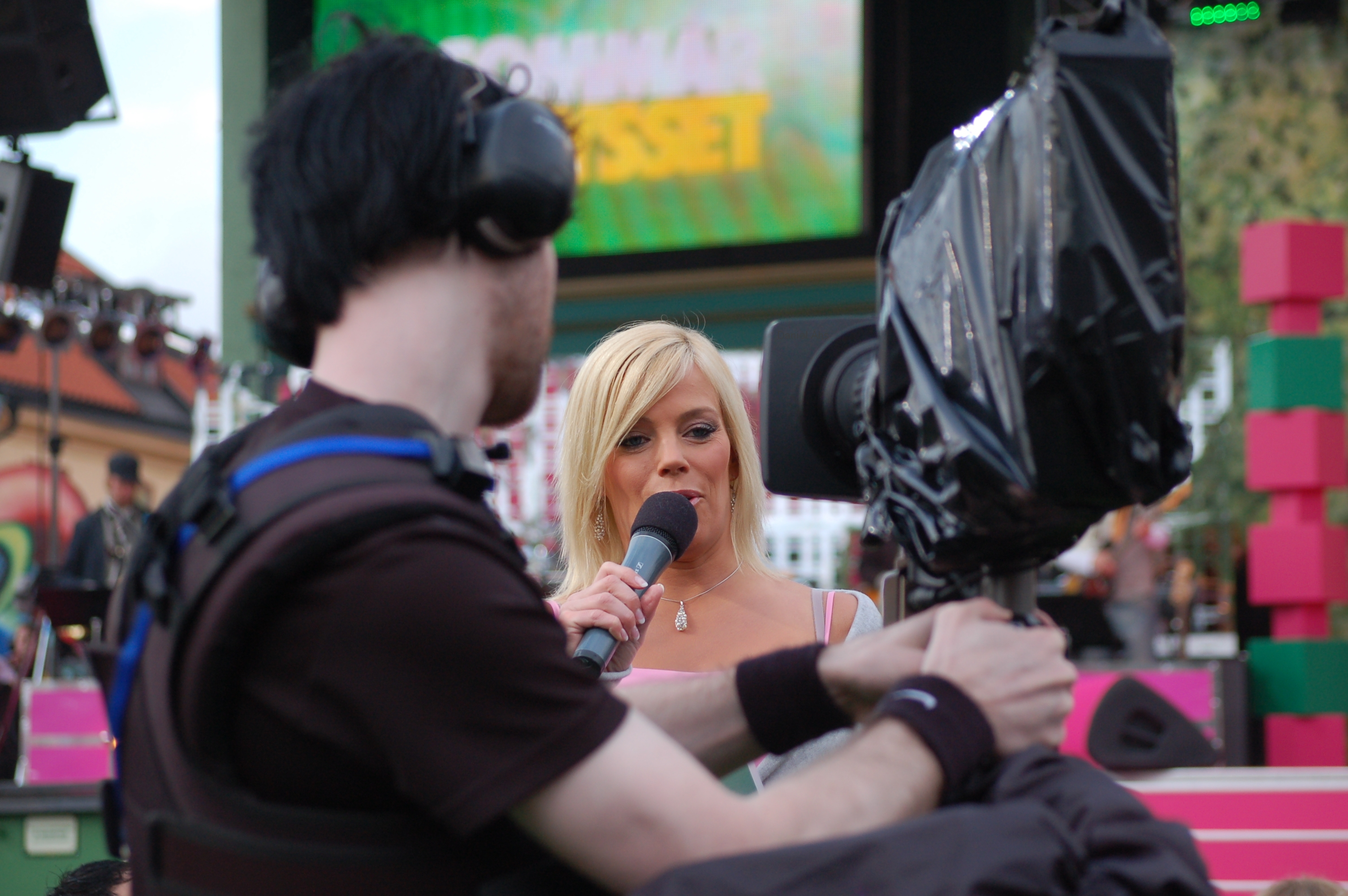
Gry Forssell, host of the show

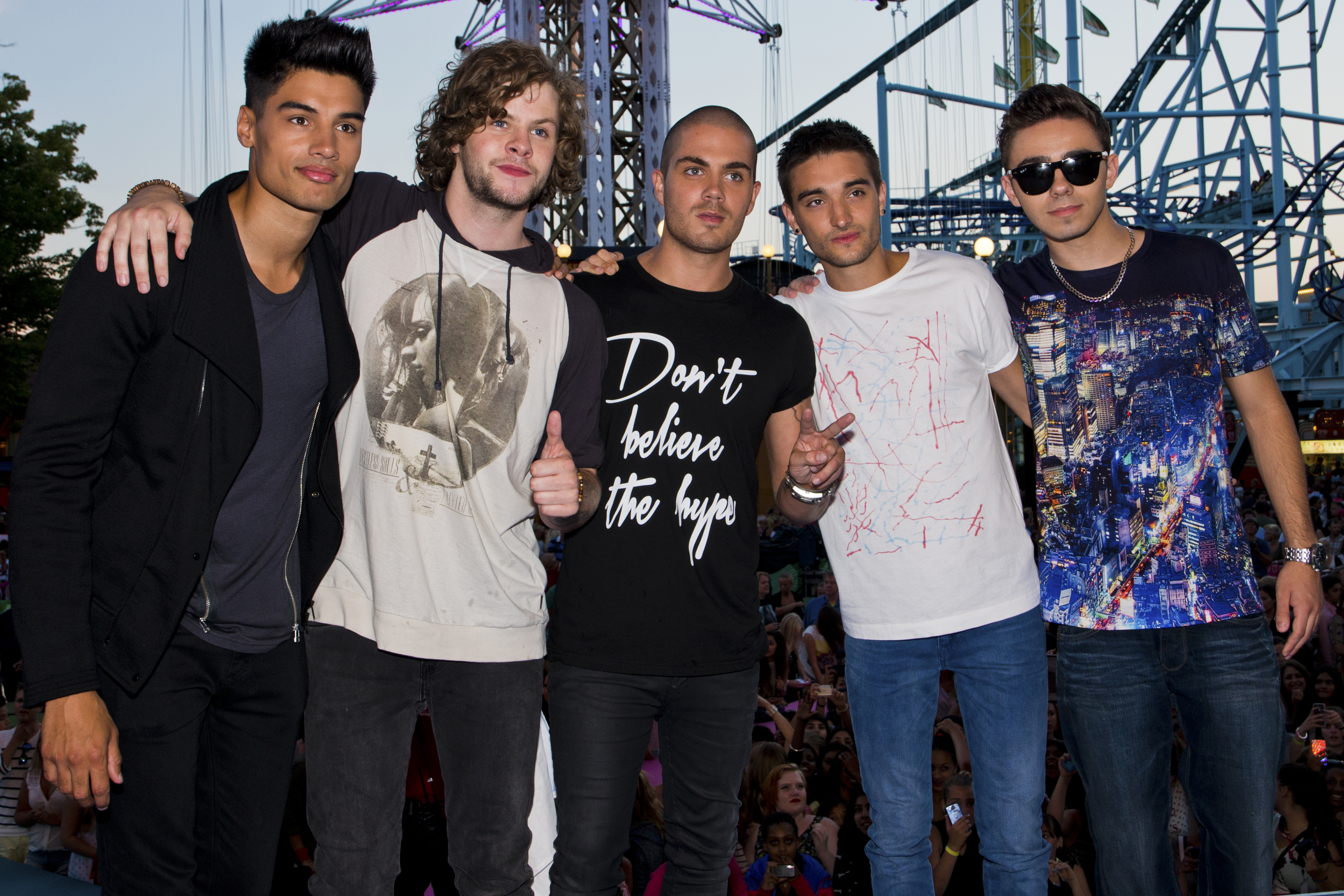
The Wanted on the show

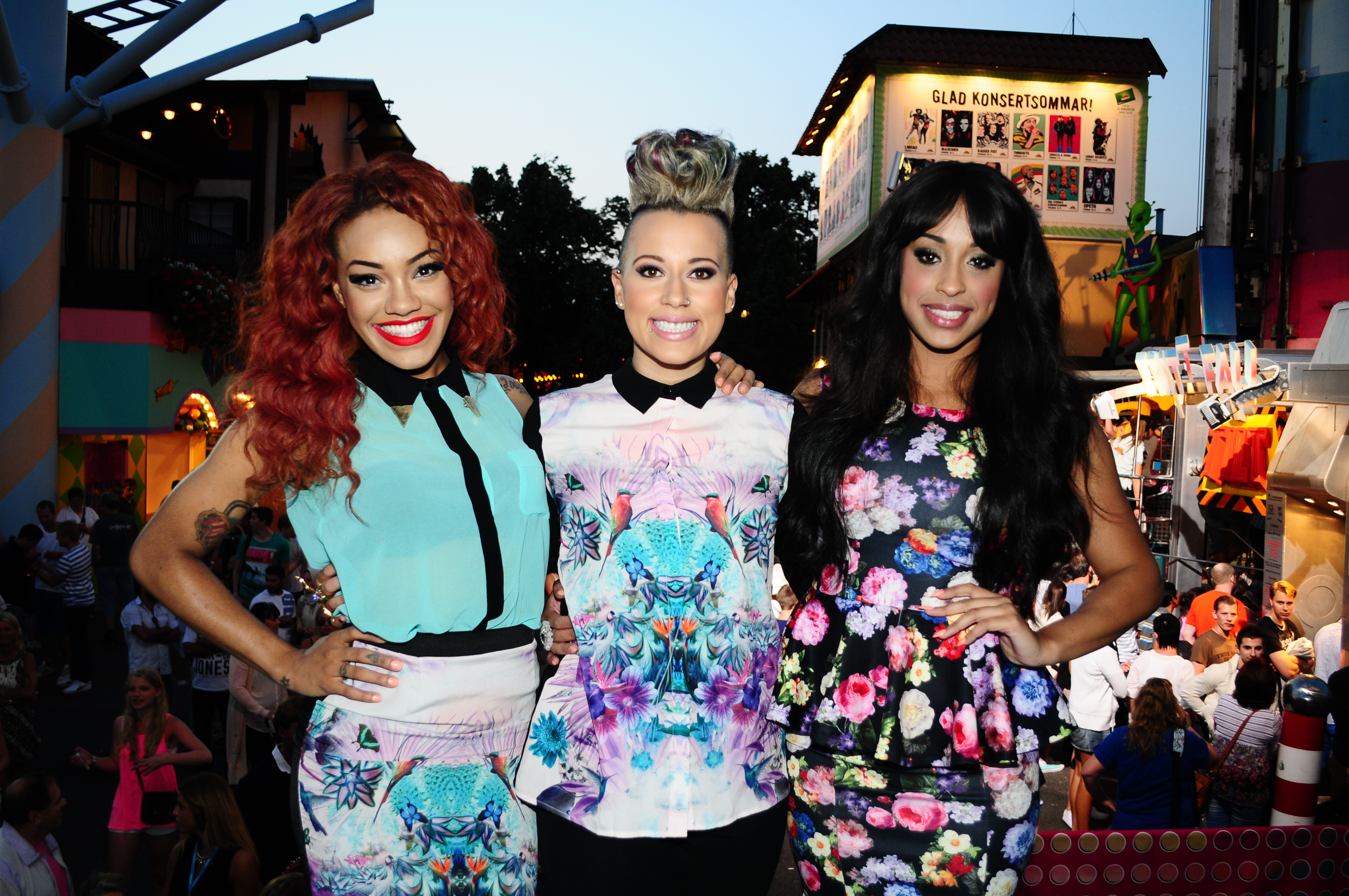
Stooshe on the show

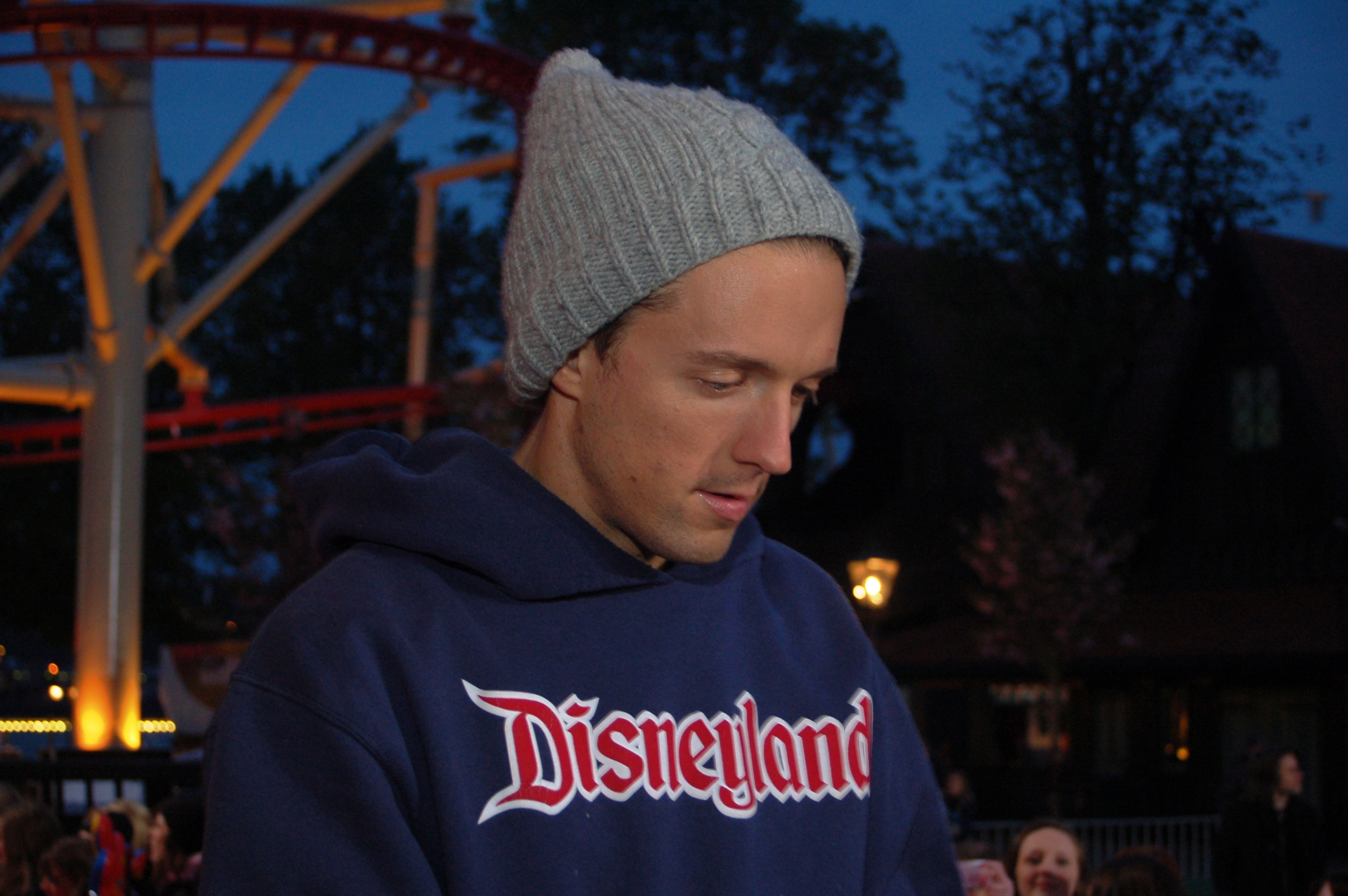
Jason Mraz on the show

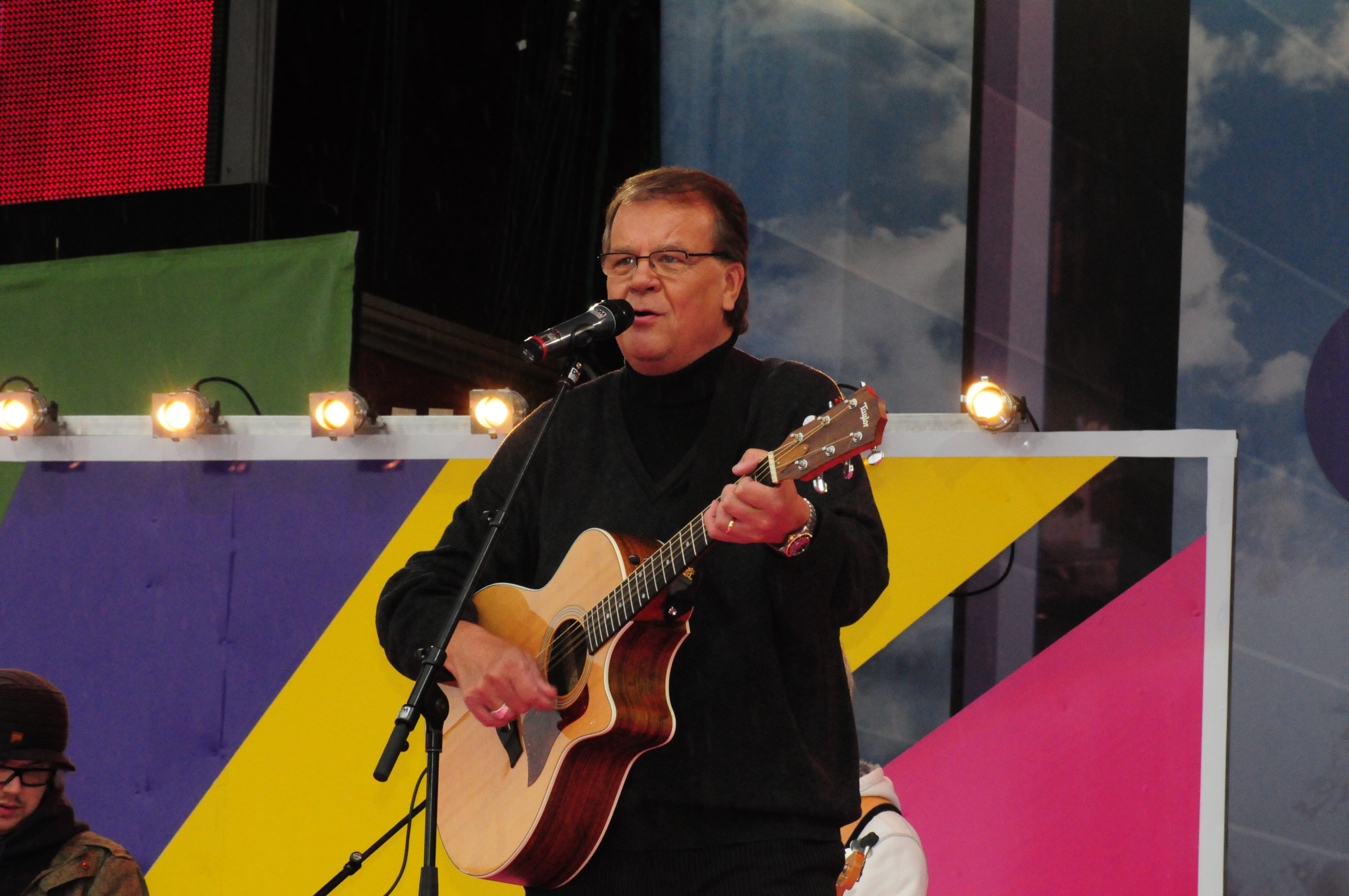
Lasse Berghagen on the show

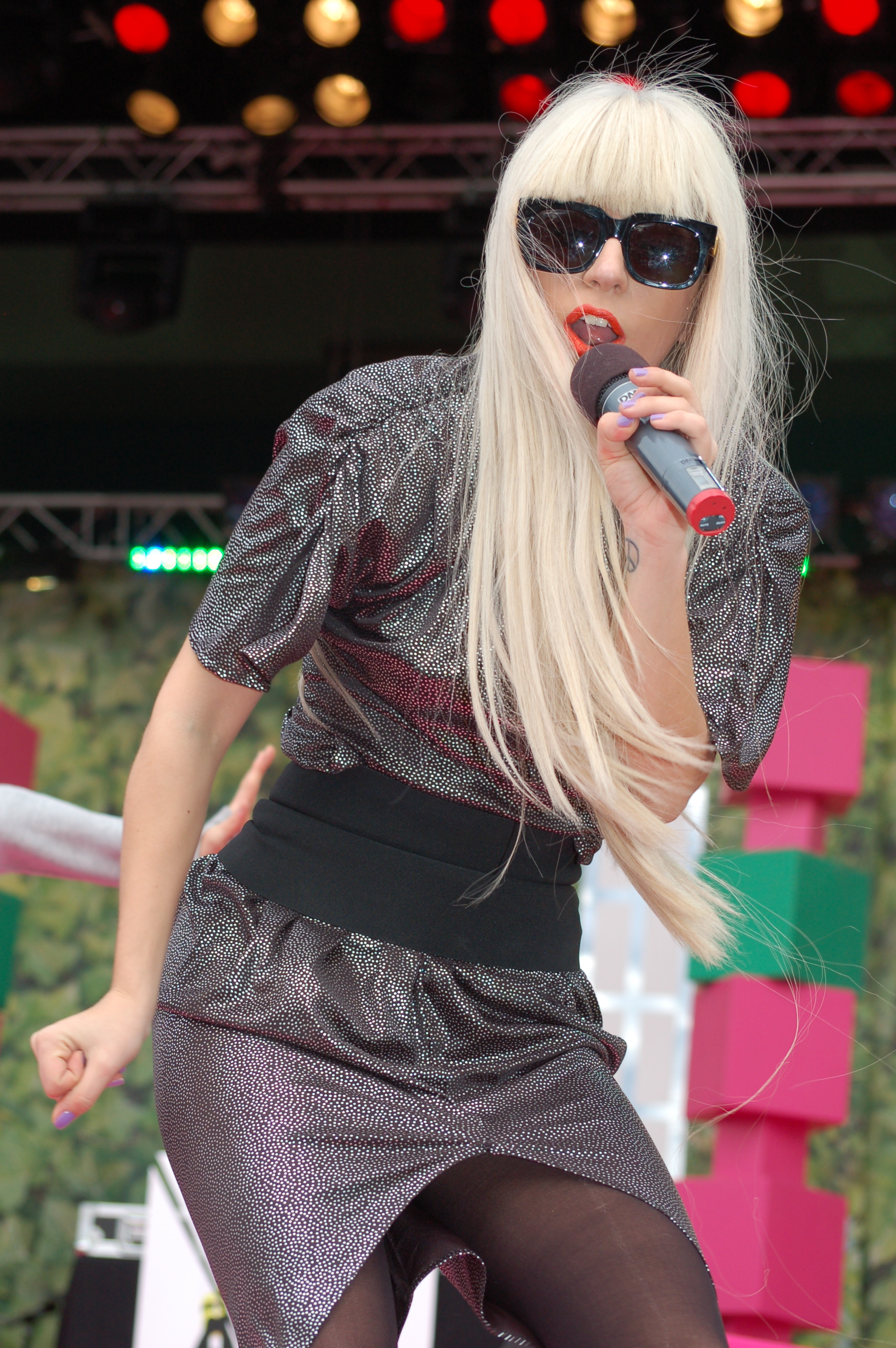
Lady Gaga on the show

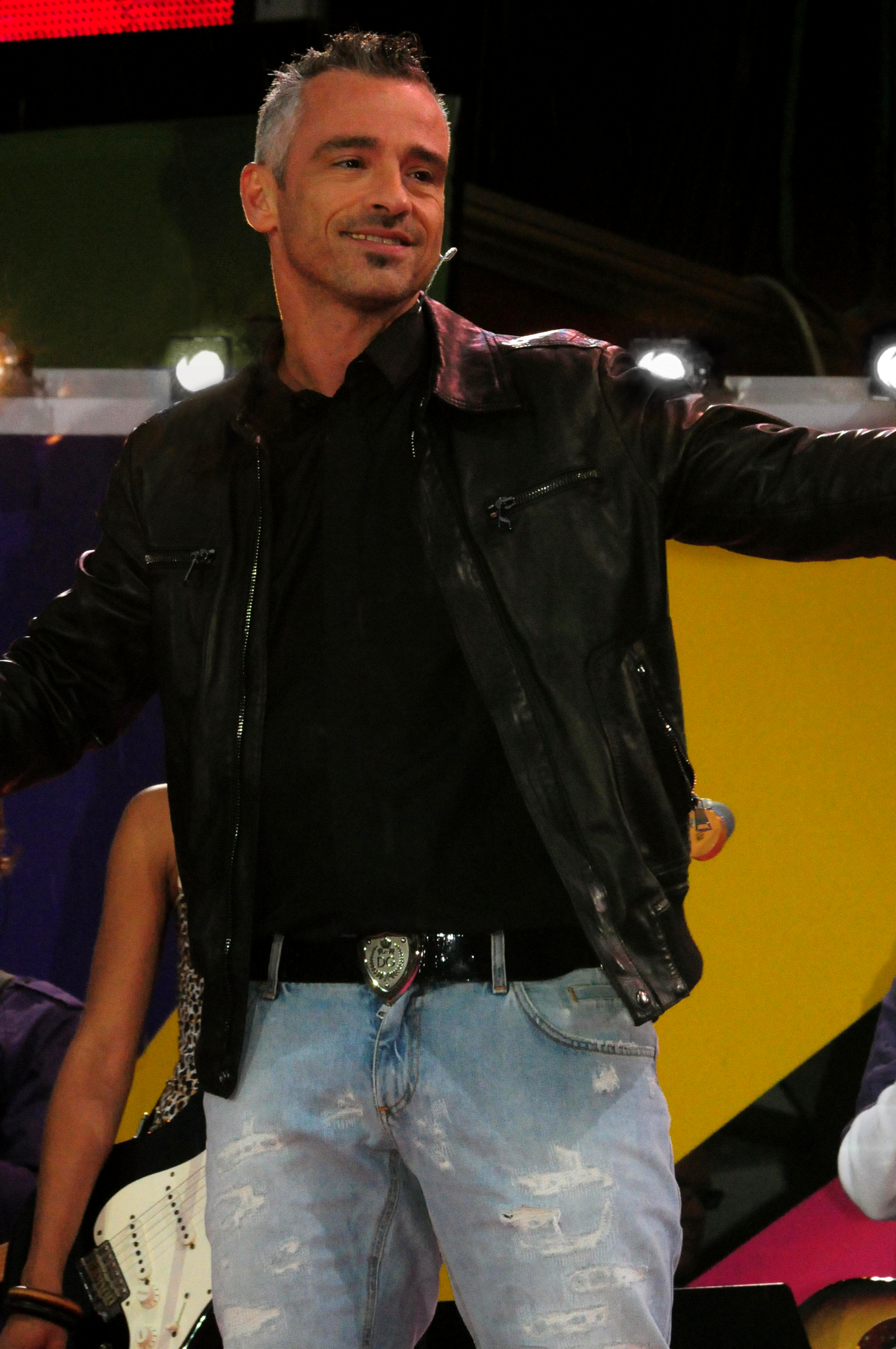
Eros Ramazzotti on the show

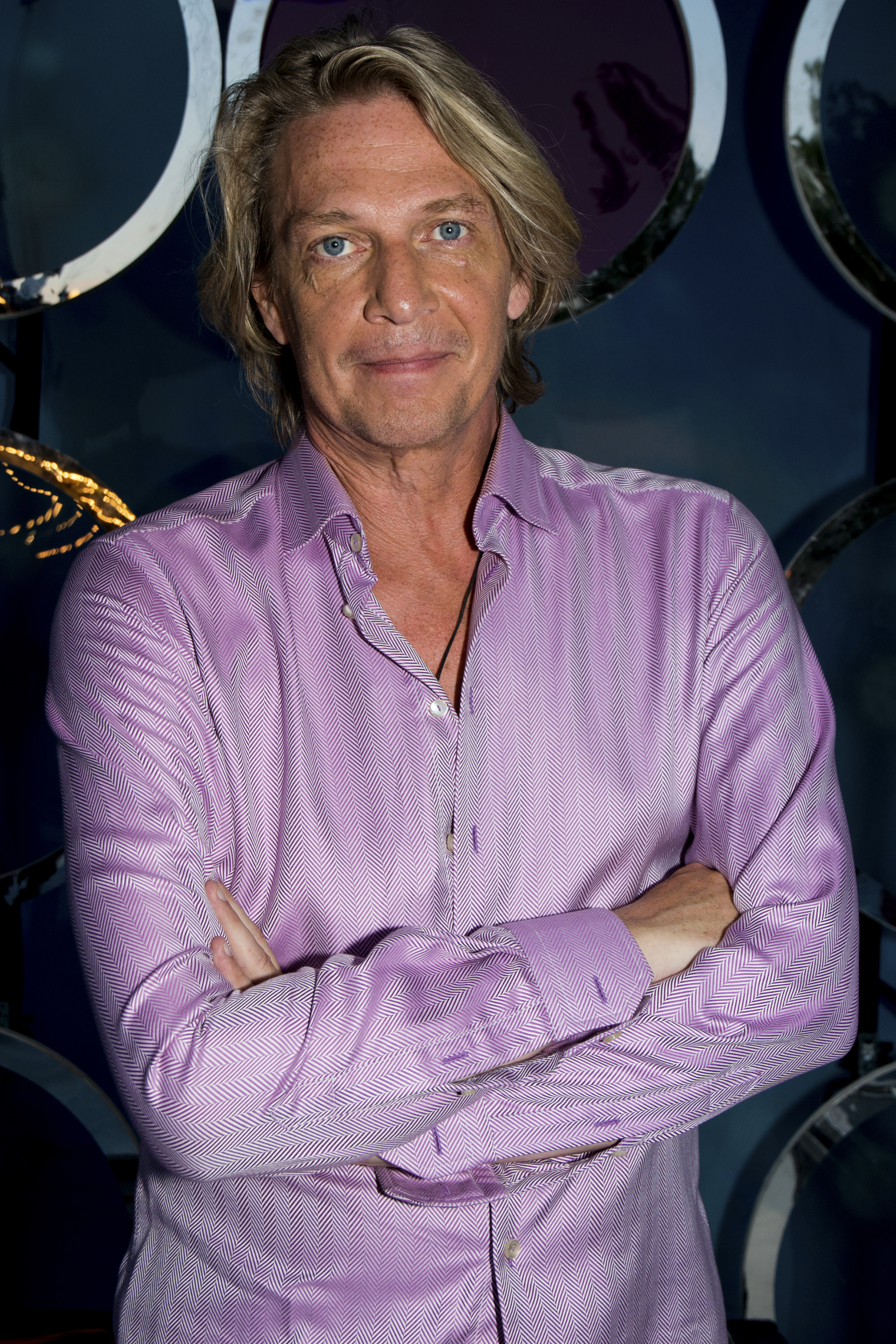
Tommy Nilsson on the show

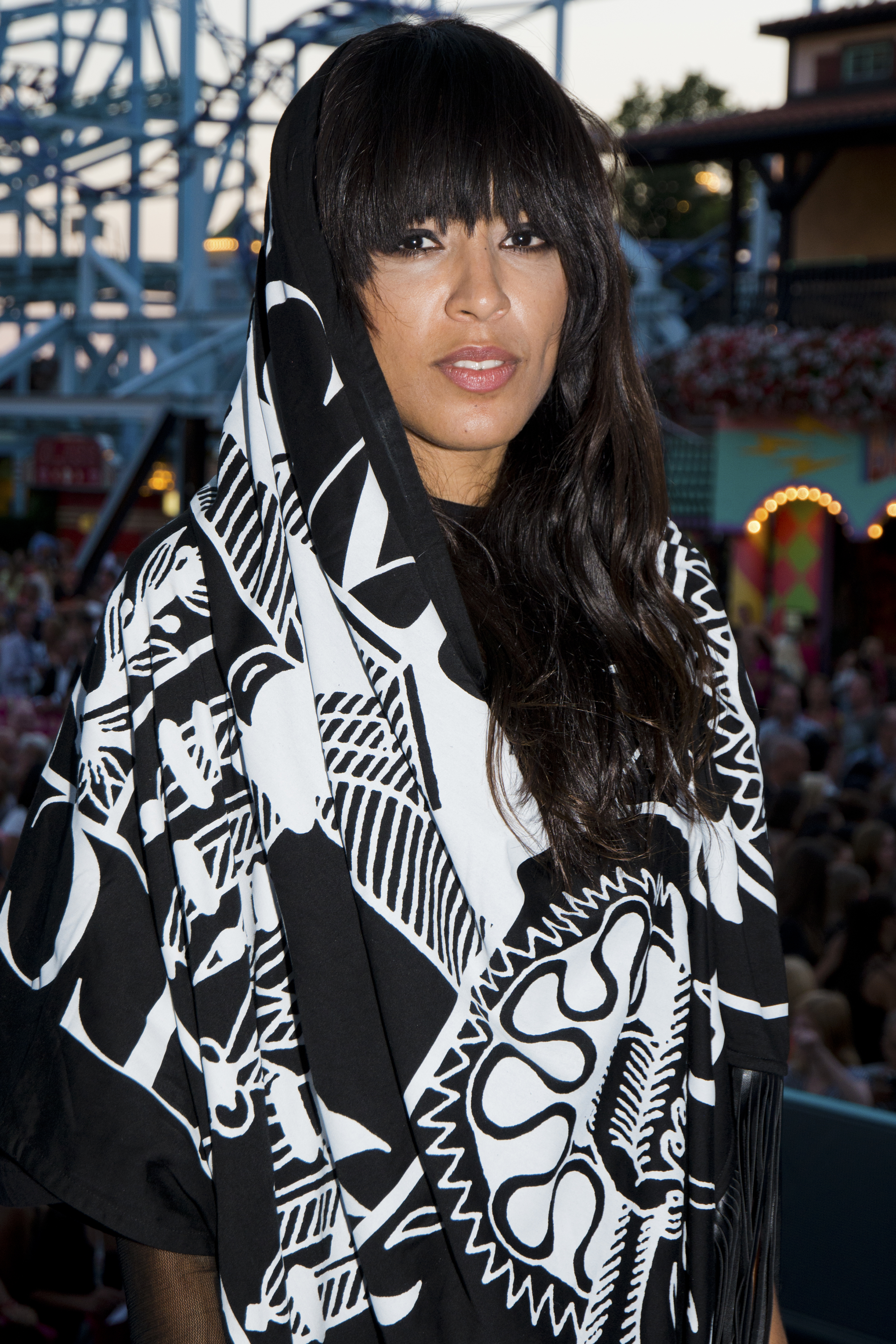
Loreen on the show

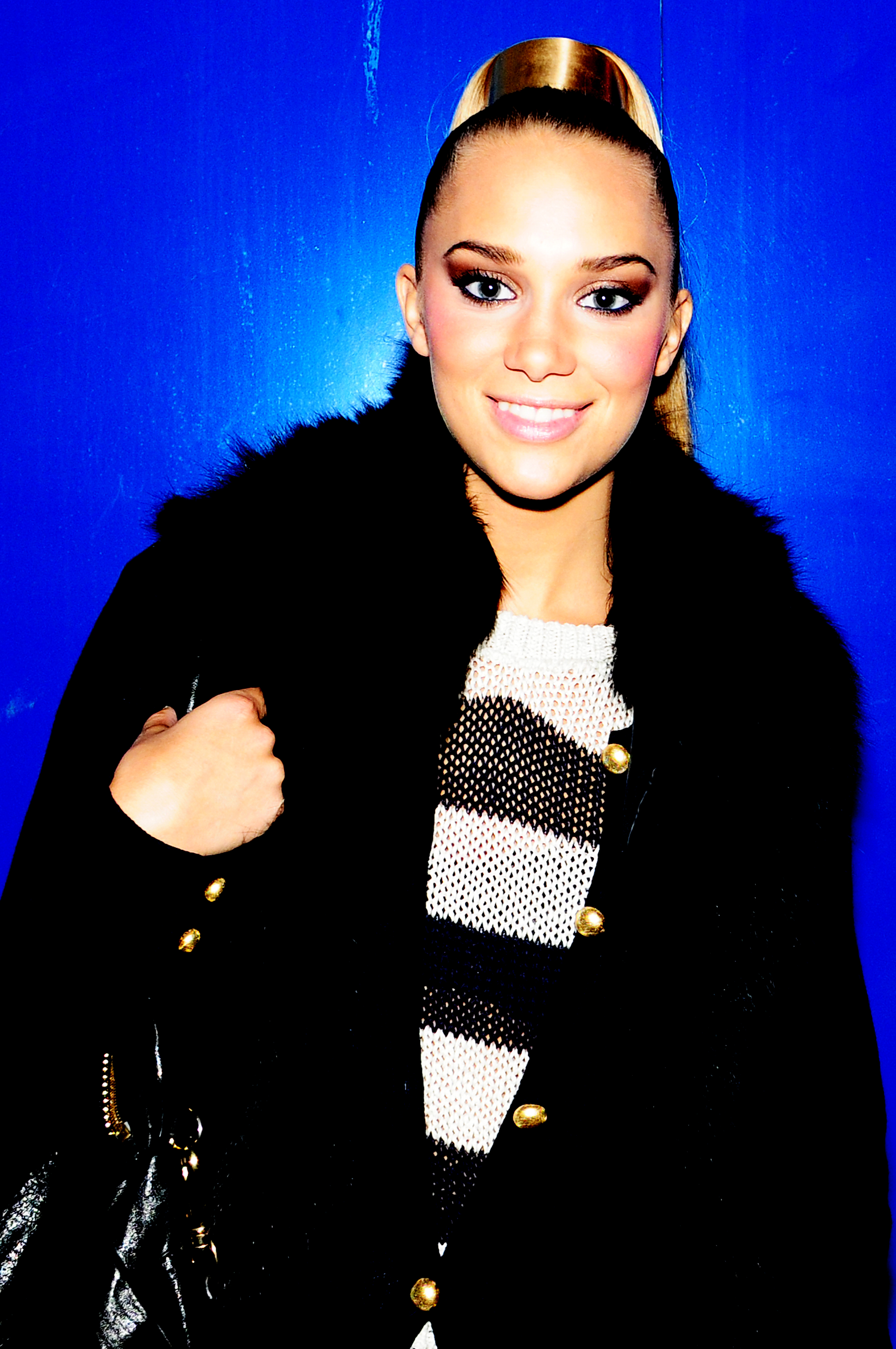
Agnes Carlsson on the show

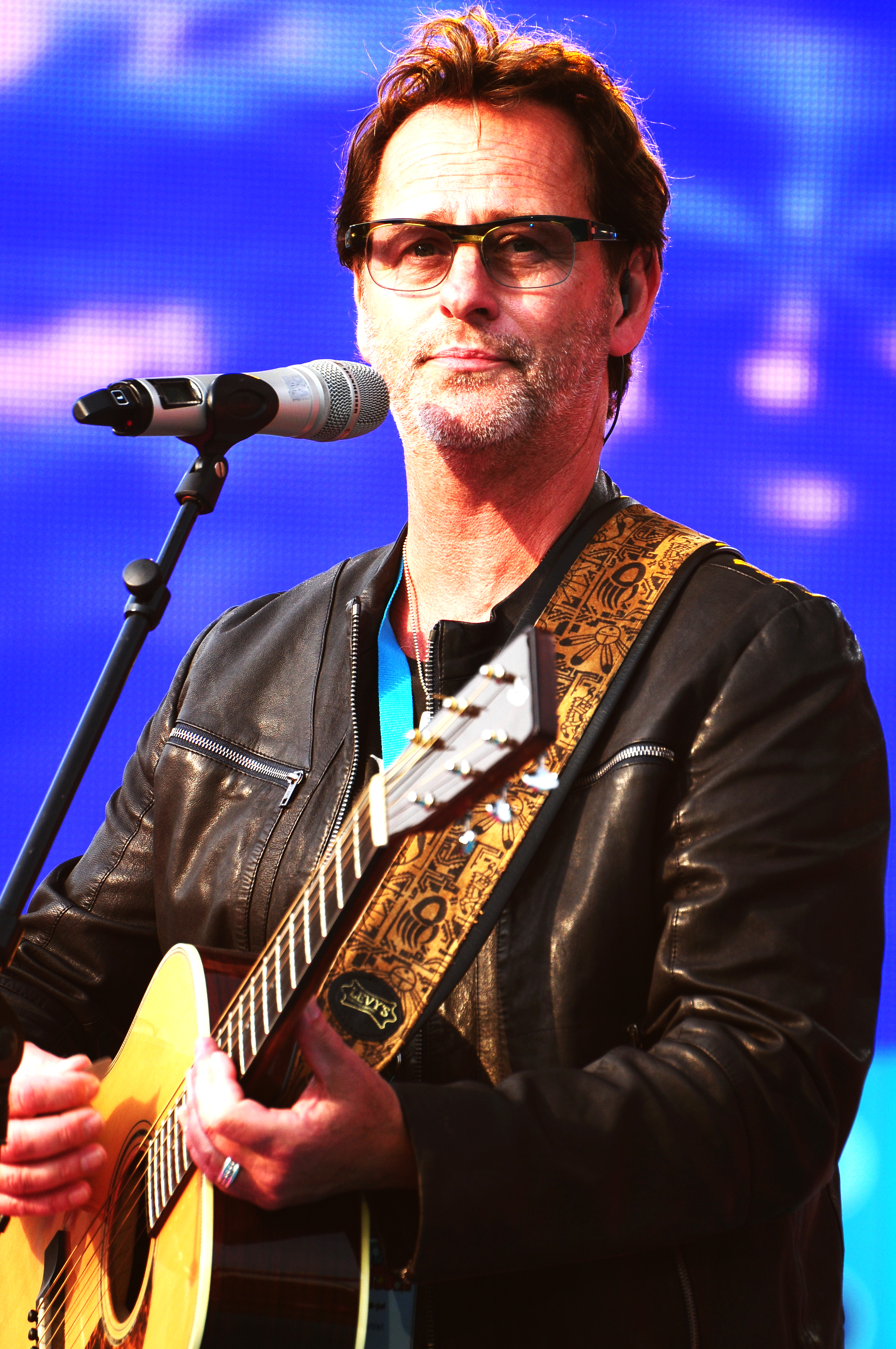
Uno Svenningsson on the show

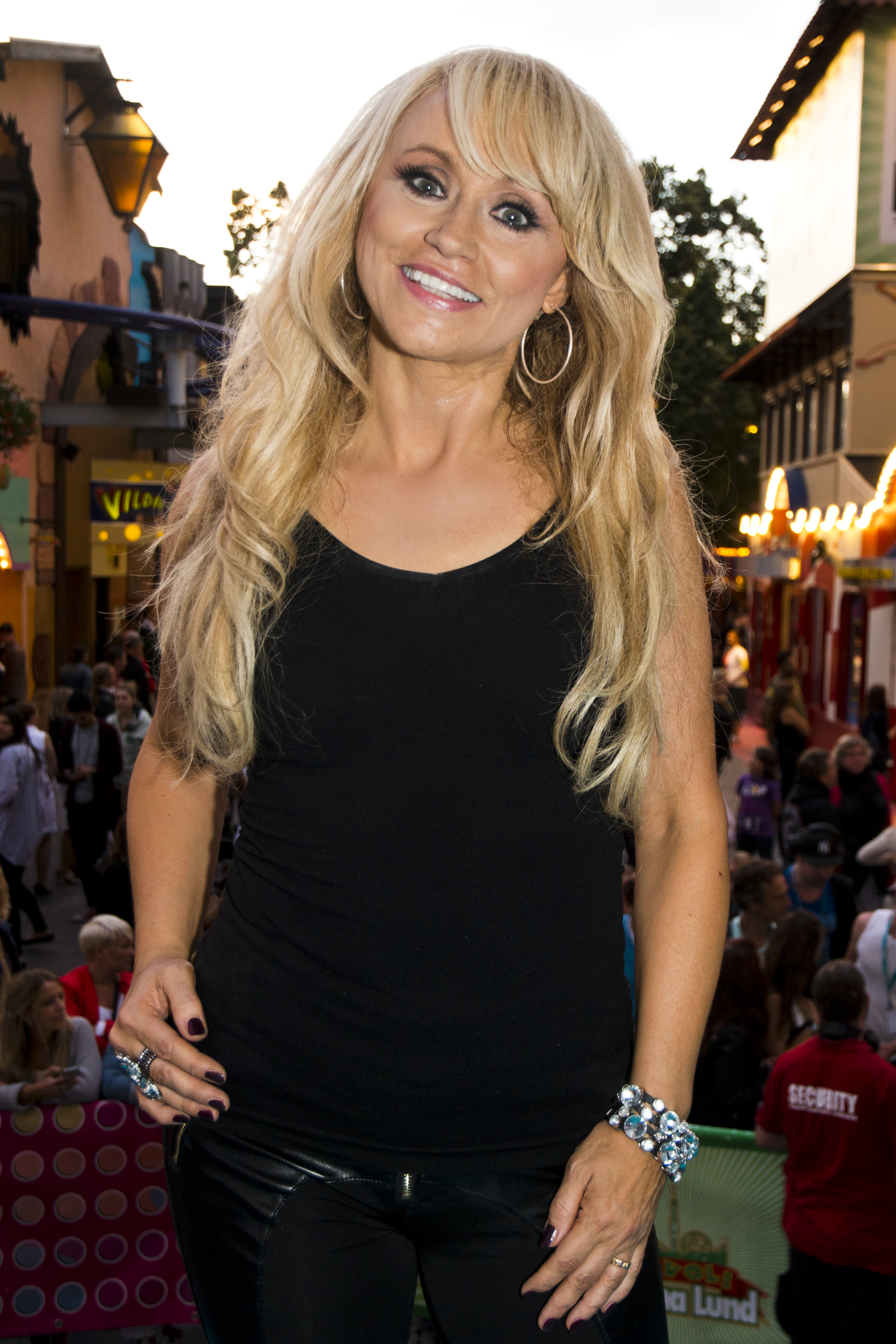
Nanne Grönvall on the show

== See also ==
- Allsång på Skansen
