= Om du vill ha mig =

Studio album by Drifters
- Released: 2001
- Genre: dansband music, schlager
- Length: circa 42 minutes
- Label: Scranta

Drifters chronology
På begäran (2000)	Om du vill ha mig (2001)	Det har jag ångrat tusenfalt (2004)

Om du vill ha mig is a 2001 studio album by Swedish band Drifters. From the album, the band scored three Svensktoppen hit songs.

== Track listing ==
1. Om du vill ha mig (Peter Dahl, Thomas Holmstrand, Linda Jansson)
2. Vem kan leva utan kärlek? (Thomas G:son)
3. Förälskad, förtrollad, förlorad (Gefunden, gehalten, verloren) (Tex Schultzieg, Peter Dahl, Thomas Holmstrand, Linda Jansson)
4. Samma sak igen (Peter Dahl, Thomas Holmstrand, Linda Jansson)
5. Kärleken rår ingen på (Thomas G:son)
6. Lyckans land (Håkan Larsson, Björn Lönnros)
7. Kom hem (och sov i min säng) (Peter Dahl, Thomas Holmstrand, Linda Jansson)
8. Mitt hjärta dansar (Henningsson, Nilsson)
9. Vandrar i månsken (Peter Dahl, Thomas Holmstrand, Linda Jansson)
10. Kärleken är evig (Torgny Söderberg, Per Gessle)
11. En på miljonen (Björn Alriksson, Ann Persson)
12. Valentine Day (Peter Dahl, Thomas Holmstrand, Linda Jansson)
13. Kärleken till dig (Håkan Larsson, Björn Lönnros)
