= Det brinner en låga =

Studio album by Drifters
- Released: 1997
- Genre: dansband music, schlager
- Length: circa 36 minutes
- Label: Scranta

Drifters chronology
Det finns en (1995)	Det brinner en låga (1997)	På begäran (2000)

Det brinner en låga is a 1997 album by Swedish band the Drifters.

== Track listing ==
1. Det brinner en låga (Hans Backström, Peter Bergqvist)
2. Jag chansar (I'm Walking) (Fats Domino, Dave Bartholomew, Margareta Forsberg)
3. Ring till mig (Tommy Gunnarsson, Elisabeth Lord)
4. Jag säger som det är (Ann Persson, Björn Alriksson)
5. Vila (Rose-Marie Stråhle)
6. Passar det inte så går jag (Tommy Gunnarsson, Elisabeth Lord)
7. Milda makter (Ulf Nordquist, Margareta Forsberg)
8. Du ger kärleken ett namn (Magnus Ekwall)
9. Tennesseevalsen (Tennessee Waltz) (Redd Stewart, Pee Wee King, Ninita, Tommy)
10. En vacker dag (Tommy Gunnarsson, Elisabeth Lord)
11. Den gamla goda tiden (Ulf Nordquist, Margareta Forsberg)
12. It's so Easy (Buddy Holly, Norman Petty)
13. Blå violer (Rose-Marie Stråhle)
