= Svenska dansbandsmästerskapen =

Svenska dansbandsmästerskapen (meaning Swedish Dansband Championships) is an annual music competition event for dansbands (dance bands) in Sweden. It was held between 1991 and 2003 when it was suspended. Dansbands were chosen by public vote after local elimination events prior to the final.

== Winners ==
(locations in parentheses)

- 1991: Carina Jaarneks (Ronneby
- 1992: Grönwalls (Hässleholm)
- 1993: Fernandoz (Torsby)
- 1994: Mats Bergmans (Nyköping)
- 1995: Martinez (Sundsvall)
- 1996: Boogart (Malå)
- 1997: Joyride (Stockholm)
- 1998: Casanovas (Vadstena)
- 1999: Sound Express (Mariestad)
- 2000: Expanders (Boden)
- 2001: Hjältarna (Södertälje)
- 2002: Zlips (Östersund)
- 2003: Gamblers (Mariestad)
