= Blå blå känslor =

Studio album by Drifters
- Released: 5 November 2014
- Genre: Dansband music
- Label: Neptun

Drifters chronology
Jukebox (2013)	Blå blå känslor (2014)

Blå blå känslor is a 2014 album by Swedish band, Drifters.

== Track listing ==
1. Jag räknar ner
2. Here You Come Again
3. Blå blå känslor
4. Ingen av oss förstår
5. Du bara du
6. Måndag morgon
7. Smultron på ett strå (summertime version)
8. Louisiana
9. Det är kanske försent
10. Böna och be
11. Lugn efter en storm (Calm After the Storm)
12. You Can't Love Me Too Much
13. Nu ser jag livet genom tårar
14. Mitt hjärta finns kvar här ändå

== Charts ==
Chart (2014)	Peak position
Sweden	18
