= Jag ringer på fredag =

Single by Sven-Ingvars

from the album Minnenas melodier
- A-side: "Jag ringer på fredag"
- B-side: "Skolfröken Nilsson"
- Released: April 1967
- Genre: schlager
- Label: Svensk American
- Songwriter: Ingvar Hellberg

"Jag ringer på fredag" is a song written by Ingvar Hellberg, and originally recorded by Sven-Ingvars and released as a single in April 1967. In 1979, the song appeared on the Sven-Ingvars album Minnenas melodier.

The Sven-Ingvars version charted at Svensktoppen, where it stayed for two weeks between 21–28 May 1967, with a 5th position followed up by an 8th position.

In 1967, the song was also performed by Anders Dahls orkesteron the EP Kristina från Vilhelmina.

In 1974, Ceges recorded the song as B-side for the single Köp hjärtan mitt hjärtas telefon, while Wallonerna recorded it on the 1986 album Dansmusik (2).

The song has also been recorded by Black Ingvars in 1995, appearing in the Karlstads collage Sven-Ingvars songs medley on the album Earcandy Five which also was a B-side for the 1996 single Vem tänder stjärnorna?. In 1996 it was performed by Titanix on the album Livs levande.

At Dansbandskampen 2008 the song was performed by Scotts. The Scotts version also appeared on the Dansbandskampen 2-CD compilation album.

At Körslaget 2009, the song was performed by Stefan Nykvist's choir from Älvdalen.

In 2010, the song was recorded by Wretaz on the album Vi hörs!.

== Charts ==
Chart (1967)	Peak position
Norway (VG-lista)	5
