= Ulf Granberg =

Swedish comic book editor (1945–2026)

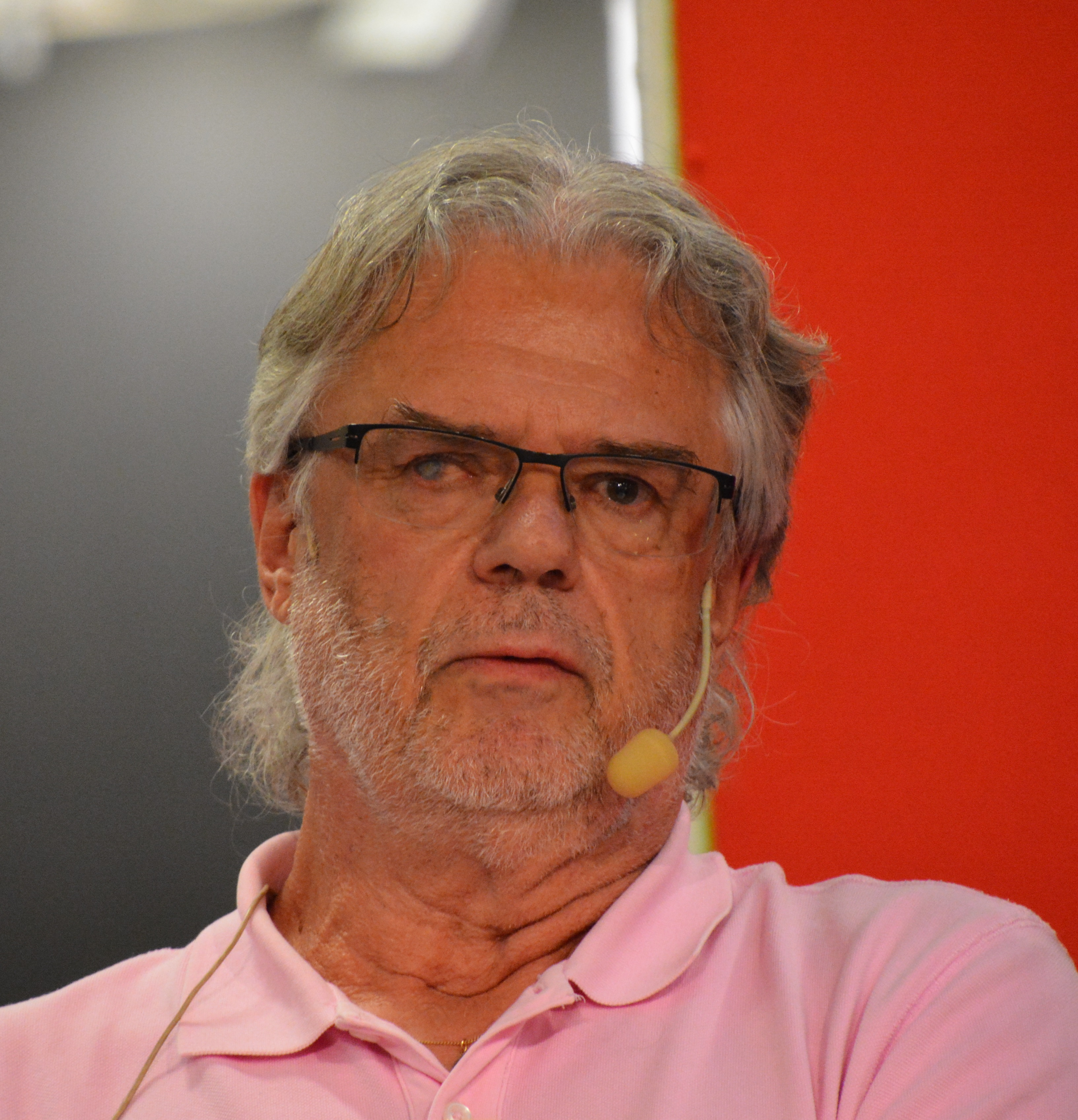
Ulf Granberg

Ulf Leo Granberg (9 May 1945 – 9 January 2026) was a Swedish comics creator and editor. Best known for his work with the Swedish comic book Fantomen, dedicated to the American comic strip The Phantom, Granberg was the editor and publisher of many other comic books as well.

== Life and career ==
Granberg was born on 9 May 1945, and became best known as the long-term editor of the Swedish comic book Fantomen.

The first issue with Granberg as an editor was published in 1973. In 1986, Granberg left the editorship to Mats Jönsson, but continued to be responsible for the Swedish production of licensed Phantom stories and assumed the title Gammelredax ("The Old Editor").

At the turn of the year 2003 he again became the editor of Fantomen, a position he held until 2012 when he was succeeded by editor Mikael Sol.

Over the years, Granberg was also the editor and publisher of many other comic books. Among other things, he was the driving force behind the magazine Svenska Serier. Granberg also translated a number of notable comics, mainly for the comic books he worked with. Among his other translation works into Swedish is the album edition of American comic strip Prince Valiant.

In 2015, he was awarded the Mini-Adamson Award which is awarded annually to notable cartoonists and other people working with comics publishing.

Granberg worked at the publishing company Semic Press, that was later purchased by Egmont Publishing.

His son Fredde Granberg is an actor.

Granberg died on 9 January 2026, at the age of 80.
