= Casanovas =

Swedish musical group

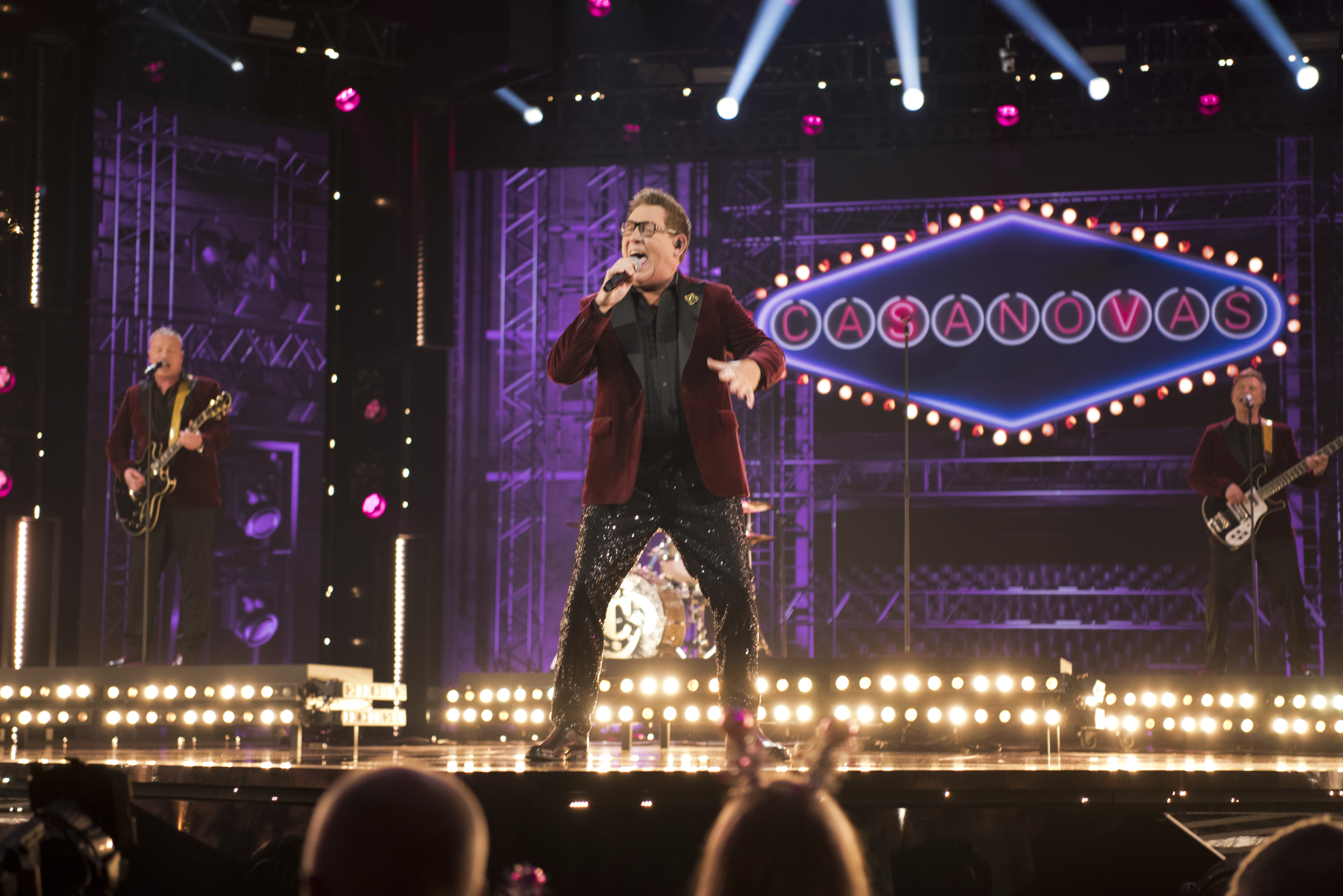
- Casanovas performing in 2023

Background information
- Origin: Vadstena, Sweden
- Genres: dansband
- Years active: 1989–present
- Labels: Atenzia Records
- Members: Henrik Sethsson; Jimmy Lindberg; Stefan Ryding; Hans Plahn
- Past members: Andreas Hedenskog
- Website: www.casanovas.se

Casanovas is a Swedish dansband established in 1989 in Vadstena, Sweden. They won the Svenska dansbandsmästerskapen, the Swedish Dansband Competition in 1998 with Andreas Hedenskog as vocalist. The present line-up of the band is Henrik Sethsson on vocals (who has replaced Hedenskog), Jimmy Lindberg on guitar, Stefan Ryding on bass and Hans Plahn on drums.

Their album Livet börja nu released on 30 May 2012 entered the official Swedish Albums Chart at #6 in its initial week of release.

== Discography ==
=== Albums ===
Year	Album	Peak chart positions
Year	Album	SWE
2000	I varje del av mitt hjärta	–
2007	Nu kommer jag tillbaks	39
2012	Livet börjar nu!	6
2013	Sommar i Sverige	7
2014	Hon ska bli min	14
2015	Galet mycket hits	9
2016	Kom och sjung halleluja	2
2017	Ut i livet	18
2018	Vi lever här och nu	20
2020	Mota olle i grind	14

=== Songs ===
- 1998: "Kärleken lever"
- 1999: "Minns du mig än"
- 2000: "I varje del av mitt hjärta"
- 2000: "Vem får din kärlek idag"
- 2001: "Om natten"
- 2002: "I dina ögon"
- 2002: "Låt drömmarna leva"
