= Minnenas allé =

Studio album by Fernandoz
- Released: January 19, 2005
- Genre: dansband music
- Label: Doreme

Fernandoz chronology
Vem får din kärlek i natt (2003)	Minnenas allé (2005)	En helt ny dag (2008)

Minnenas allé is a studio album by Fernandoz, released on 19 January 2005.

== Track listing ==
1. Minnenas allé (Kent Liljefjäll, Roberto Mårdstam, Claes Linder)
2. Maria Therese (Robert Broberg)
3. Alla vägar bär till dej (Peter Bergqvist, Hans Backström)
4. Monica (Magnus Andersson, Lars Waldefeldt)
5. Försök förstå (Anders Nordlund, Peter Månsson)
6. Mest av allt (I Love You Because) (Leon Payne, Gösta Rybrant, Lennart Reuterskiöld)
7. Är det konstigt att man längtar bort nån gång (I'm Gonna Be a Country Girl Again) (Buffy Sainte-Marie, Stig Anderson)
8. Varför (Åsa Karlström, Mats Larsson)
9. Minns du björken (Sven-Erik Magnusson, Gun Pettersson)
10. Dina blåa ögon (Johan Strömberg)
11. En sommardröm i vitt (Ganz in Weiß) (Rolf Arland, Bengt Sten)
12. Kan du se ett ljus (Birgitta Formgren, Torbjörn Karlström)
13. Där näckrosen blommar (Sven Du Rietz, Sven-Olof Sandberg)
14. Vad jag längtar hem (Peter Åhs)

== Charts ==
Chart (2005)	Peak position
Sweden (Sverigetopplistan)	9
