= Fernandoz =

- Origin: Vittsand, Sweden
- Genres: Dansband music
- Years active: 1986-

Fernandoz is a Swedish dansband formed in 1986 in Vitsand, near Torsby. They had a big hit in 1991 entitled with the song "Jag vet att jag vill ha dig". The band won the "svenska dansbandsmästare" award in 1993 and they started appearing on the popular television program Bingolotto, for a number of times. Their most recognized hits include "Guld och gröna skogar", "En dag den sommaren", "När ett hjärta har älskat" Band guitarist Conny Ohlson and singer Anders Nordlund have won a Swedish Grammy "Guldklaven" for their work.

== Members ==
Because of its long existence, the band has seen many changes.

Present members are:

- Anders Nordlund (1990-) - Solo singer, bass, guitar, accordion
- Tom Manninen (2004-) - Saxophone, guitar, vocals
- Kevin B. Nordlund (augusti 2010-) - Keyboards, accordion, vocals
- Thomas Wikström (2011-) - Drums, vocals

Earlier members included:

- Stefan Olsson - Guitar (1986 - 1997)
- Erik Strandberg - Keyboards, accordion (1986 - 1990)
- Peter Stolpe - Bass (1986 - 1990)
- Lars "i vika" Olsson - Drums, vocals (1986 - 1990)
- Christer Strandberg - Guitar, vocals (1986 - 1987)
- Lars-Inge Bergström - Guitar, vocals (1987 - 1989)
- Karl-Olof Werner - Saxophone, guitar, vocals (1989 - 2004)
- Per-Olov Olsson - Keyboards, accordion, saxophone, vocals (1991 - 1998)
- Martin Säfström - Drums, vocals (1991 - 1992)
- Mikael Kvarnlöv - Drums (1992 - 1998)
- Kenneth Herrgård - Keyboards, accordion, saxophone, vocals (1998 - 2007)
- Peter Månsson - Drums (1998 - 2001)
- J-O Ekström - Drums, vocals (2001 - 2002)
- Robert Eriksson - Drums (2002 - 2003)
- Mattias Berghorn - Drums, vocals (2003 - 2005)
- Göran Landberg - Drums (2005 - 2006)
- Conny Haglund - Keyboards (2007 - 2008)
- Git Persson - Accordion, vocals (2007 - 2009)
- Svante Gustavsson - Keyboards, accordion, vocals (2009 - 2010)
- Conny Ohlson - Guitar, steel guitar (1997 - 2011)
- Conny Falk - Drummer, vocals (2006 - 2011)

== Discography ==
=== Albums ===
Studio and live albums

Year	Album	Peak positions
Year	Album	SWE
1995	Dina ögon svarar ja	
1997	Ett enda minne	
1999	Guld och gröna skogar	
2001	Tomma löften	51
2003	Vem får din kärlek i natt	13
2005	Minnenas allé	9
2008	En helt ny dag (Fernandoz - Anders & Git)	6
2008	På väg igen	28
2008	Se mig i ögonen	11
2013	Home Sweet Home	7
2014	En bättre man	36
2016	Country Classics	52
2019	Livet	9
2022	Nu tar vi nya tag	39

Compilation albums

- 1995: Mitt liv med dig
- 1998: När ett hjärta har älskat
- 2002: En dag den sommaren
- 2006: Maria Therese
- 2008: Mest av allt - Fernandoz bästa låtar (Reached number 56 in Swedish Albums Chart)
- 2009: Upp till dans 11 (Expressens dansbandssatsning 2009)

=== Singles ===
- 1993: "Jag vill ha dig" / "Stand by Me" / "Café Nostalgi" / "What a Wonderful World"
- 1993: "Radio Luxemburg/Elvis Medley"
- 1994: "Våga tro på kärleken" / "The Great Pretender" / "Härliga lördag"
- 1994: "Dina ögon svarar ja" / "Det är dig jag tänker på"
- 1996: "När alla vindarna vänder" / "Stuck on You"
- 2000: "Störst av allt är kärleken" / "I kväll så ska det hända"
- 2001: "Tomma löften" / "Far och son i okänt land"
- 2001: "Stjärnor ska tändas i natt" / "Rock'N'Roll Crazy"
- 2003: "Vem får din kärlek i natt" / "I natt jag drömde"

=== Svensktoppen songs ===
- 1995: "Dina ögon svarar ja"
- 1995: "Mitt liv med dej" with Christina Lindberg
- 1997: "När alla vindarna vänder"
- 1997: "När ett hjärta har älskat"
- 1998-9: "Guld och gröna skogar"
- 1999: "En dag den sommaren"
- 1999: "Midnight Rendez-Vous"
- 2000: "Störst av allt är kärleken"
- 2001: "Tomma löften"
- 2002: "Stjärnor ska tändas i natt

Non-charting

- 1994: "Våga tro på kärleken"
- 1997: "Livets källa"
- 2008: "En helt ny dag"
