= Byhåla =

Swedish television series

Byhåla (a derogative slang term for a boring village) is a comedy series featuring Ronny and Ragge, played by Fredde Granberg and Peter Settman. The series aired on SVT in 1991 to 1993.
