= Fredde Granberg =

Swedish actor, playwright and director

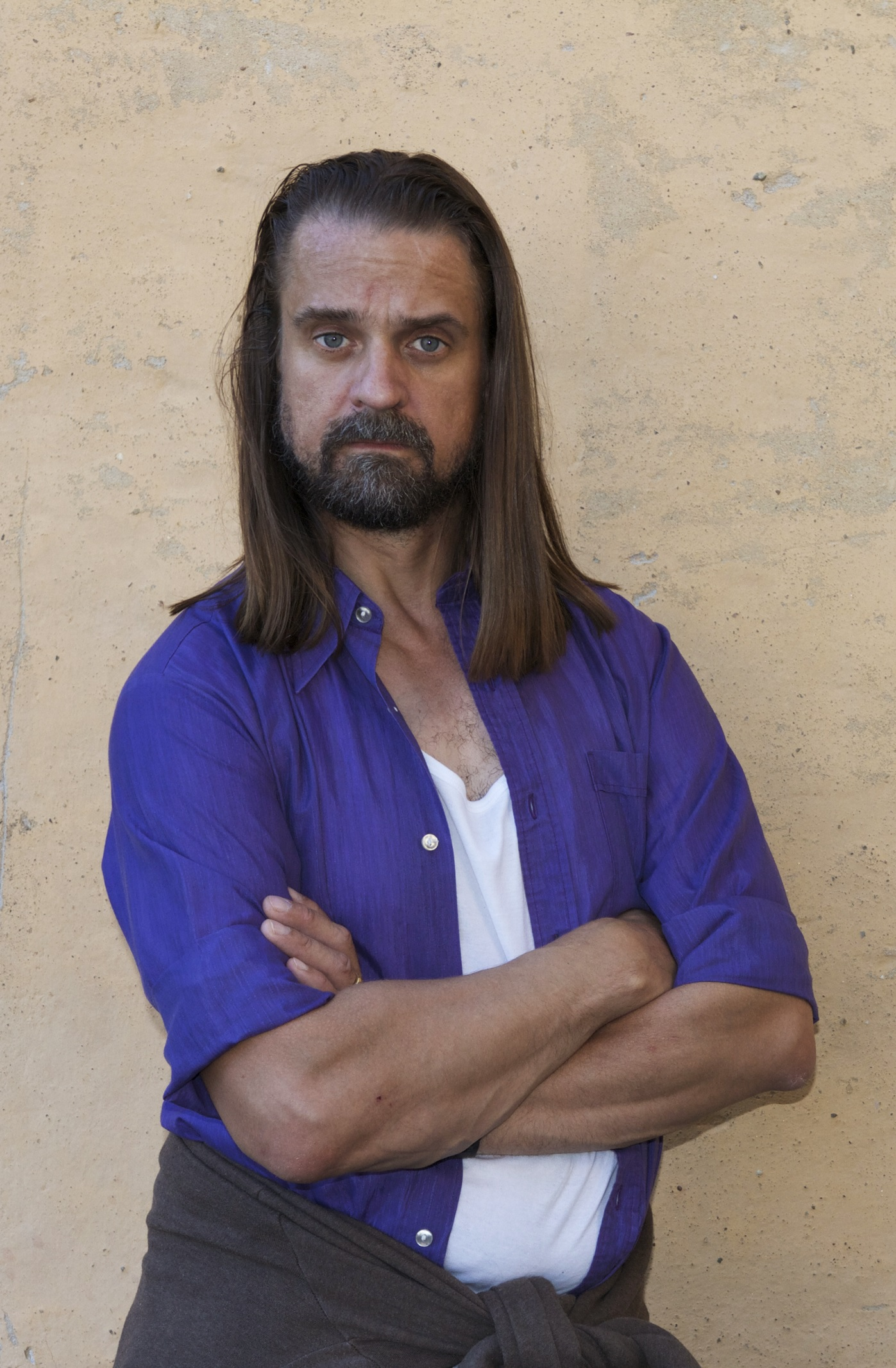
Granberg in 2014

Fredrik Jörgen Granberg (born 11 November 1970) is a Swedish actor, playwright and director, perhaps mostly known for his role in the Ronny and Ragge comedy series, which he played along with actor Peter Settman. In the 2013 Julkalendern on SVT, he played the lead role in Barna Hedenhös. He is the son of editor Ulf Granberg.

Granberg was born in Spånga, Sweden.
