= Höllberg (Westerwald) =

Mountain in Hesse, Germany

Coordinates: 50°38′42″N 8°09′00″E

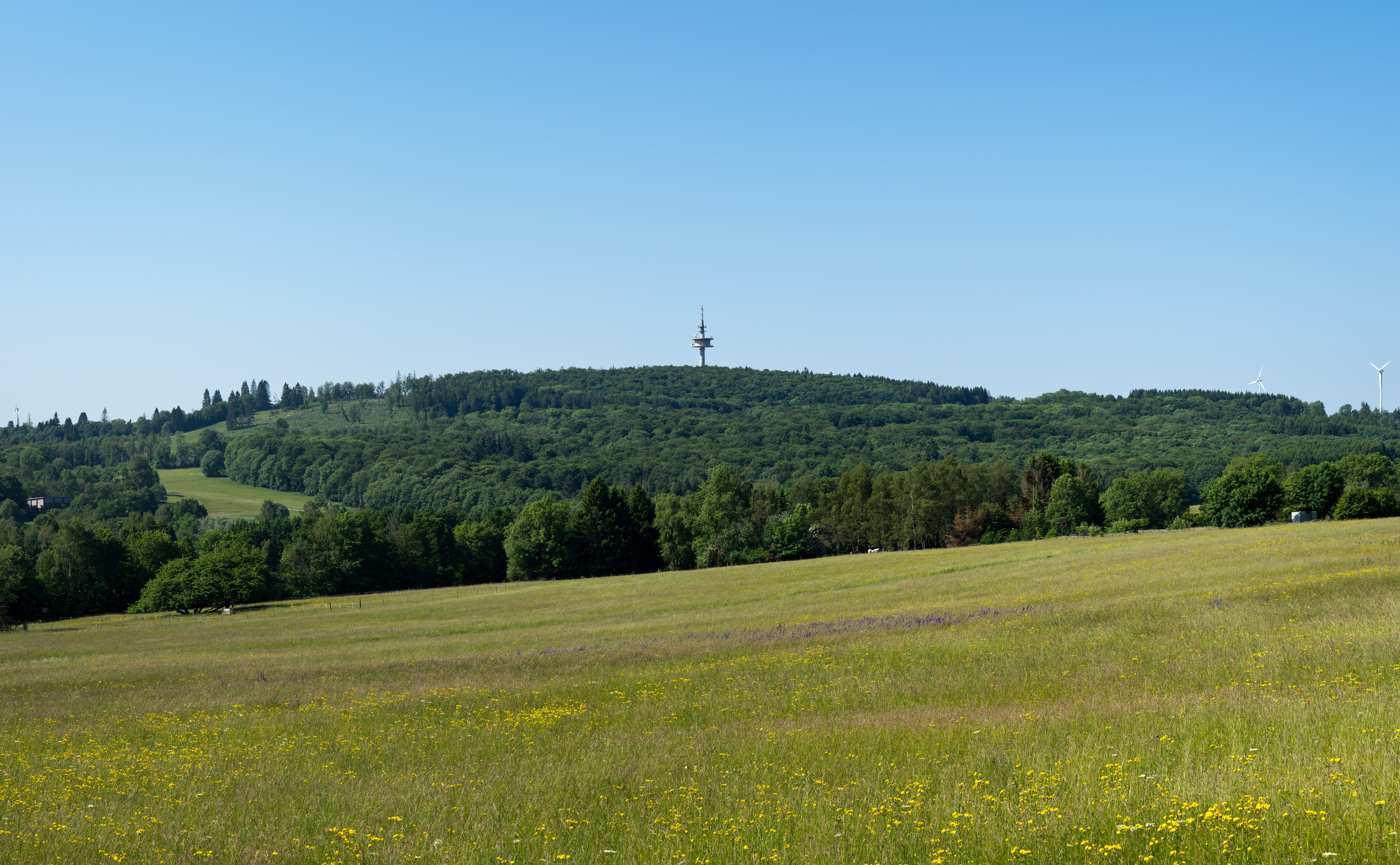
- View of the Höllberg

Highest point
- Elevation: 642.8 m (2,109 ft)

Geography
- Location within Hesse Location within Germany
- Location: Lahn-Dill-Kreis, Hesse, Germany
- Parent range: Westerwald

Höllberg is a mountain of the Westerwald in Hesse, Germany.
