= Willez =

Swedish dansband

- Origin: Ljungbyhed, Sweden
- Genres: Dansband music

Willez is a Swedish dansband from Ljungbyhed made up of Linus Troedsson (vocals), Emil Hansen (guitar), Johannes Olofsson (bass), Oliver Brons (drummer) and Niklas Lazukic (keyboards). Originally the band was named Milles after the guitarist member Emil Hansen, but was renamed Willez after they discovered that there was already a band called Milles.

Willez took part in Dansbandskampen in 2010, where they finished runners-up behind the winners Elisa's. The band is best known for the songs "Jag vill vara din Margareta", "Satellite" and "Snälla snälla".

== Discography ==
Year	Album	Peak chart positions	Certification	Notes
Year	Album	SWE	Certification	Notes
2012	Louisiana: Date of release: 2012; Record label: Mariann	11		
