= Ronny and Ragge =

Fictional Swedish raggare characters

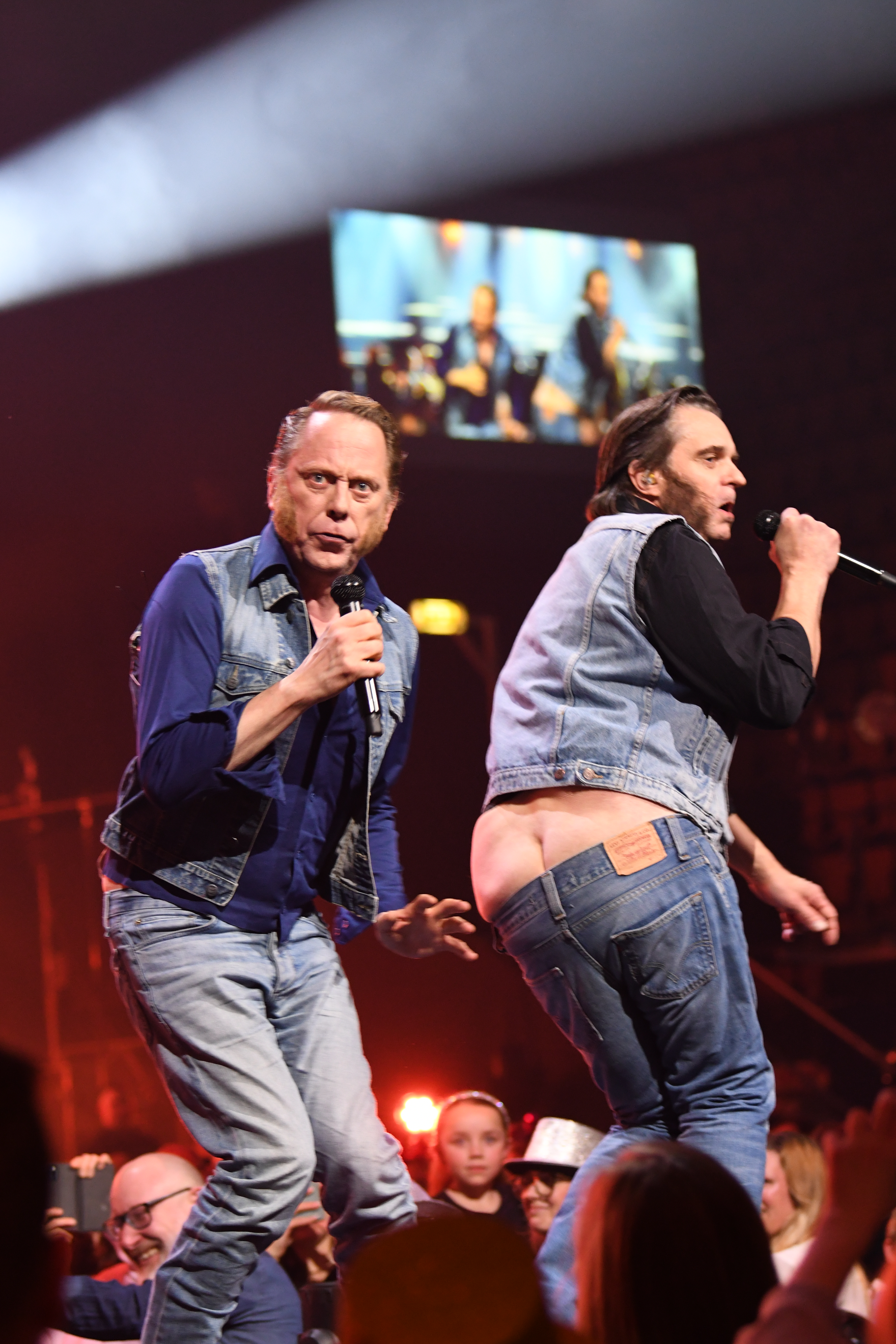
Ronny and Ragge in 2025

Ronny and Ragge (Ronny och Ragge in Swedish) are two fictitious raggare characters played by Peter Settman and Fredde Granberg, popularized in the 1990s. They first appeared in sketches on Swedish television and then got their own series called Byhåla on Sveriges Television.
