= BlackJack (Swedish band) =

Swedish dansband

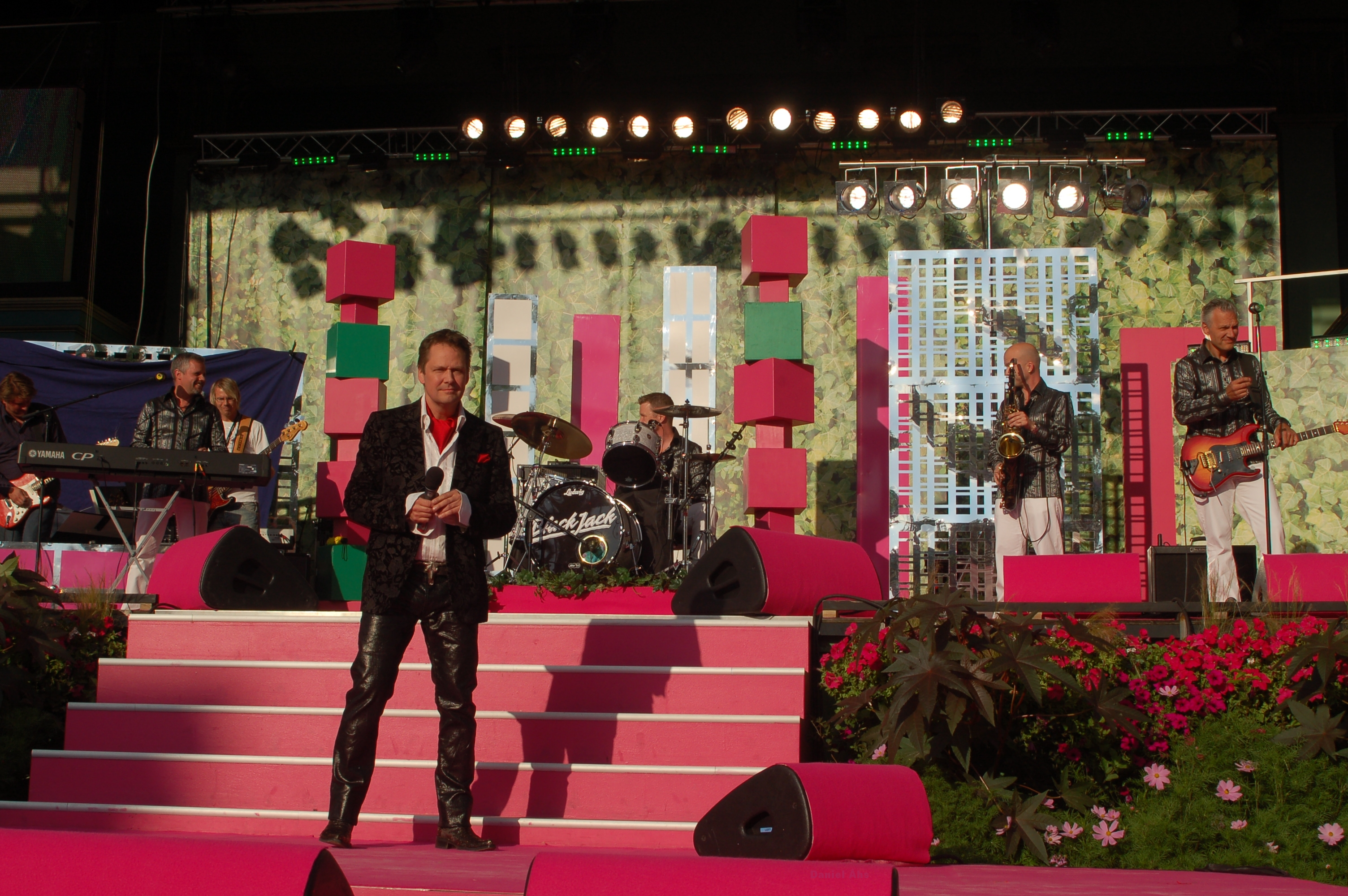
- BlackJack performing in August 2008

Background information
- Origin: Sundsvall, Sweden
- Genres: Dansband
- Years active: 1990–present
- Members: Kjelle Danielsson; Peder Matz; Ove Olsson; Mikael Östlin; Morgan Östlin

BlackJack is a Swedish dansband formed in Sundsvall in 1990. Their most famous hit song with "Inget stoppar oss nu". Throughout the years, the band has scored several other Svensktoppen hits, including "Om det känns rätt" in 1996.

The band was founded by Tony Ljungström, who also appeared in the film, and Torbjörn Eriksson (former Kapellmeister).

The band has played at TV shows like "Bingolotto", "Go'kväll", "Jeopardy!" and "Mat-Tina". They have also appeared in a Europolitan commercial.

== Personnel ==
- Kjelle Danielsson – vocals
- Peder Matz – keyboards, accordion
- Ove Olsson – guitar, vocals
- Mikael Östlin – drums
- Morgan Östlin – keyboards, saxophones

== Discography ==
=== Albums ===
Year	Album	Peak positions
Year	Album	SWE Sverigetopplistan
1991	Den stora kärleken	–
1996	Om det känns rätt	–
1998	Du och jag och kärleken	–
2001	En gång till	53
2004	Fina flickor	59
2006	Vad vore livet utan kvinnor	–
2009	Summertime Blues	11
2010	Festival	15
2012	Casino	11
2014	Nakna på balkongen	23
2017	Rosalie	11
2019	En, två kanske tre	33

=== Compilation albums ===
Year	Album	Peak positions	Certification
Year	Album	SWE Sverigetopplistan	Certification
2008	Det bästa med BlackJack / Plus: Inget Stoppar oss nu "Inatt Inatt"	10	

=== Singles ===
- 1991: "Den stora kärleken" (a 5-track CD)
1. "Den stora kärleken" (Kent Carlsson)
2. "Girl on Swing" (Bob Miranda)
3. "Last Date" (Boudleux Bryant-Floyd Cramer)
4. "Du är vinden" (Johnny Thunqvist)
5. "Tillsammans genom gränden" (Keith Almgren-Lars-Åke Svantesson)

Charting in Svensktoppen

- 1996: "Om det känns rätt"
- 1997: "Torka tåren"
- 1998: "Du vet"
- 1999: "Vinden har vänt"
- 2000: "Nu är det lördag igen"
- 2001: "Sommar flickor"
- 2001: "Får jag låna din fru ikväll"
- 2002: "Ge mig en chans"
