= Drifters (Swedish band) =

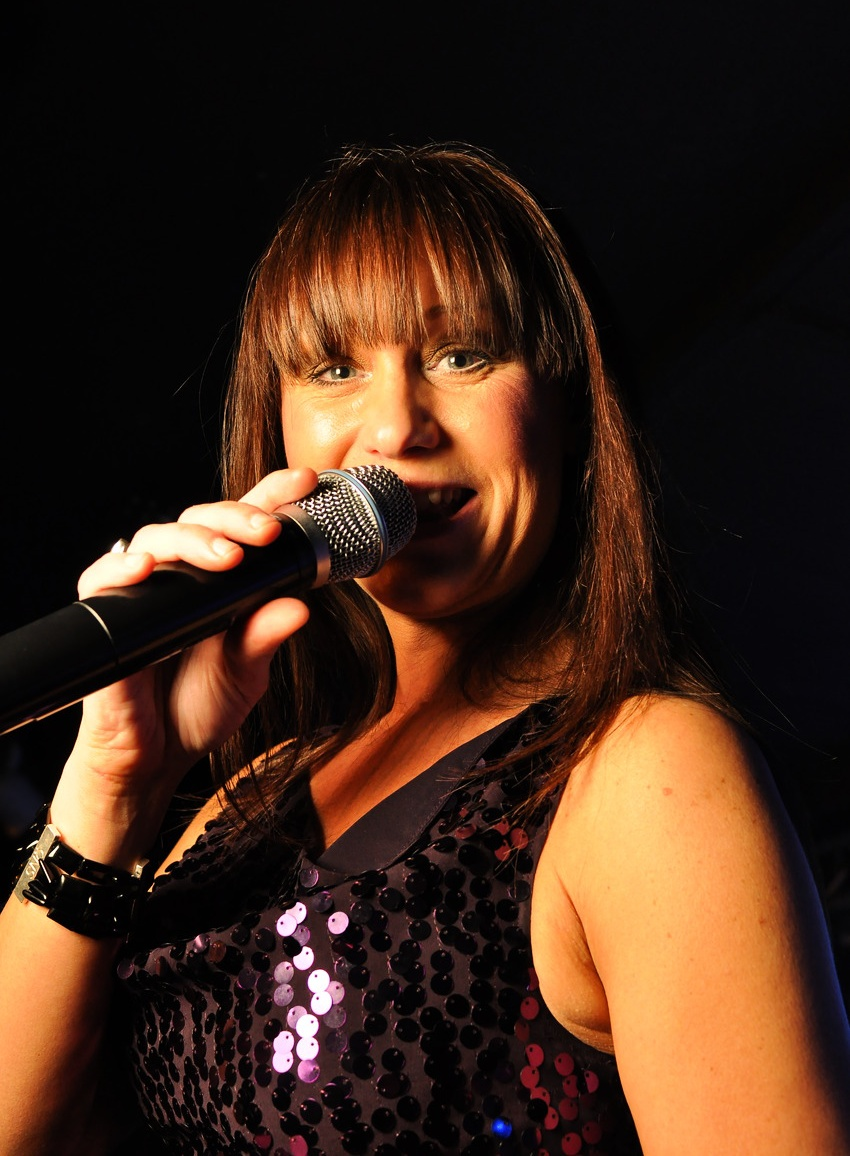
- Erica Sjöström

Background information
- Origin: Skövde, Sweden
- Genres: Dansband music
- Years active: 1962–

Drifters are a Swedish dansband from Skövde that was formed in 1962 and has won many prizes. They are signed to the Lionheart International record label.

== Members ==
In its long existence spanning several decades there were a number of key changes.

Lead singers

- 1962–1989: Johnny Wendelnäs
- 1989–1989: Ann-Charlotte Berndtsson
- 1989–1996: Marie Arturén
- 1996–1999: Ann-Charlotte Andersson (married and changed surname to Strandell in 2003)
- 1999–: Erica Sjöström

Bass

- 1968–2004: Leif Svensson
- 2004–2009: Kent Liljefjäll
- 2009– Henrik "Turbo" Wallrin

Keyboards

- 1969–1980: Lennart Green
- 1983– Stellan Hedevik

Drums

- 1983–2005: Robert Muhrer
- 2005–2011: Mattias Berghorn
- 2011– Tim Nilsson

== In popular culture ==
They also sang the theme for TV series Möbelhandlarens entitled "När du var här" in 2006.

== Awards and nominations ==
- In 2007, they were nominated for a Swedish Grammy for "Best Dance/Pop".

== Discography ==
=== Albums ===
Year	Album	Peak positions	Certification
Year	Album	SWE	Certification
1974	I kväll		
1975	Ett äventyr		
1977	Dansa, disco, rock		
1984	Tjejer		
1987	Kom igen		
1989	Drifters med dansmusiken-89 (25 years commemorative album)		
1993	Nästa gång det blir sommar		
1995	Det finns en		
1997	Det brinner en låga		
2000	På begäran		
2001	Om du vill ha mig		
2004	Det har jag ångrat tusenfalt		
2004	Träum dich zu mir		
2006	Kärlek är inget spel		
2007	Ett liv med dig	31	
2008	Midsommar: Ein lied für die Liebe	–	
2008	Tycker om dig: Svängiga låtar från förr	2	
2009	Ljudet av ditt hjärta	3	
2010	Stanna hos mig	3	
2011	Hoppas på det bästa	6	
2013	Jukebox	2	
2014	Blå blå känslor	18	
2015	Vår egen väg	35	

=== Singles ===
Year	Single	Peak positions	
Year	Single	SWE	
1993	Flyga över himmelen blå		with Marie Arturén
1993	Nästa gång det blir sommar		with Marie Arturén
1994	Kommer tid kommer råd		with Marie Arturén
1994	Lycka till		with Marie Arturén
1994	Än kan jag känna det där		with Marie Arturén
1995	Det finns en		with Marie Arturén
1995	Ännu en gång		with Marie Arturén
1997	Du ger kärleken ett namn		with Ann-Charlotte
1997	Det brinner en låga		Others
1999	Kärlek och gemenskap		Others
2000	Kärleken rår ingen på		Others
2000	Kom hem och sov i min säng		Others
2001	Om du vill ha mig		Others
1998	Jag säger som det är		Non-charting
2002	En på miljonen		Non-charting
2011	Stanna hos mig		Non-charting
