= CC & Lee =

- Origin: Malmö, Sweden
- Genres: Dansband music
- Years active: 2003-

CC & Lee is a band from Sweden, established in 2003. Their major breakthrough was Dansbandskampen 2008. In November 2011, it was announced that the band would no longer appear as a dansband.

== Members ==
- Cecilia "CC" Furlong - Vocals
- Lena "Lee" Ström - Vocals
- Robert Furlong - Guitar
- Henrik Ström - Piano
- Roger Holmberg - Bass
- Daniel Uhlas - Drums

== Discography ==
=== Studio albums ===
- 2009: Gåva till dig

=== Singles ===
- 2009: Himlen kan vänta
- 2009: Leende guldbruna ögon
- 2009: Leende guldbruna ögon (Perra remix)
- 2009: Kan du se genom tårarna
- 2010: Honey
