= Erica Sjöström =

Swedish singer and saxophonist (born 1970)

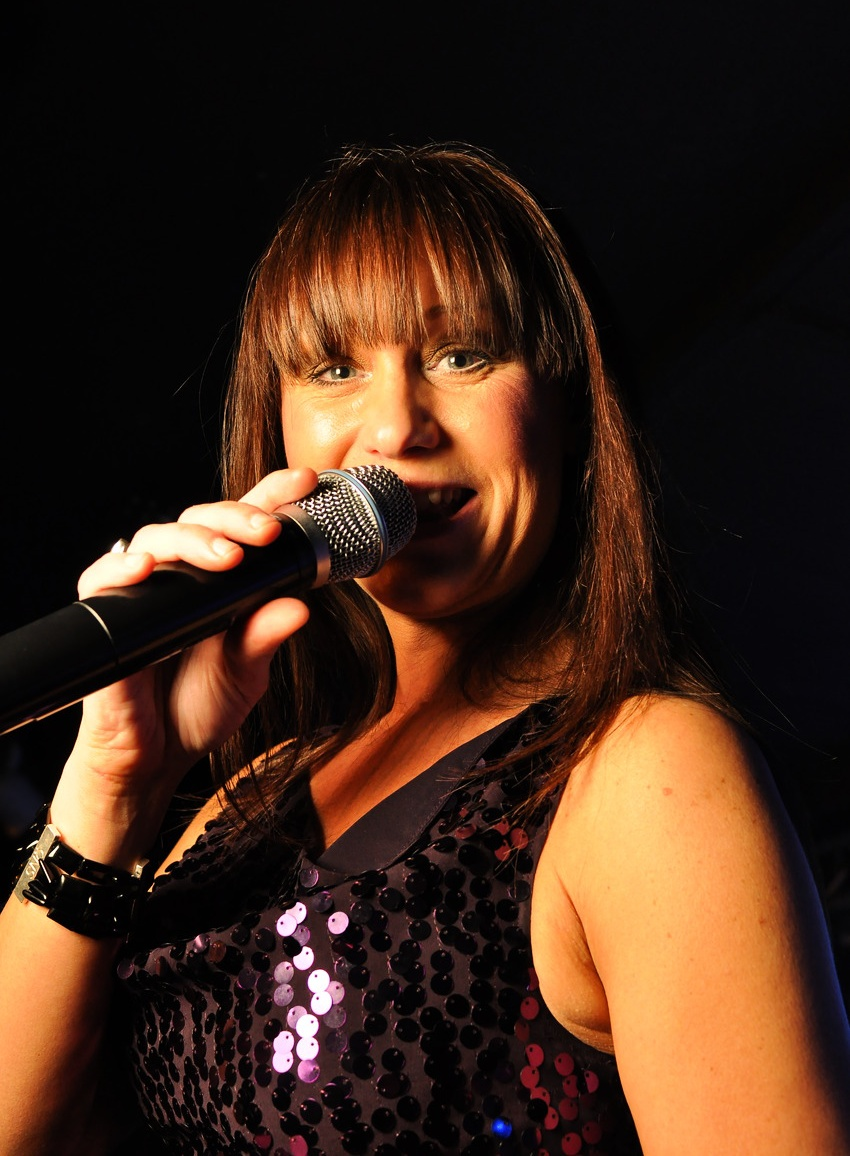
- Erica Sjöström on stage with the Drifters at Äpplet in Umeå, January 2010

Background information
- Born: 1970 (age 55–56); Tierp Municipality, Sweden
- Genres: Dansband music
- Occupations: Singer, musician
- Instrument: Saxophone

Erica Sjöström (born 1970) is a Swedish singer and saxophonist. Since 1999, she has been the singer in Swedish band the Drifters.

She was born and raised in Tierps kyrkby, Tierp Municipality, Sweden. She began her career in 1992 in the part-time band Manges orkester from Tierp. Manges participated at Svenska dansbandsmästerskapen in 1994 and 1996, reaching the finals.

In 1999, she won the "Sångmicken" contest in Ekebo. She has been awarded five Guldklaven awards in Malung, personal as "wind musician of the year" and "singer of the year", and together with the other bandmembers of the Drifters in the categories "band of the year" and "song of the year".

In 2010, she was featured in the television series Dansbandsbrudar. She could also be heard performing a duet with Scotts recording the song "In a Moment Like This".
