= Ulf Georgsson =

- Born: 22 April 1962; Kinna Parish, Sweden
- Died: 23 March 2024 (aged 61)
- Genres: Dansband music, schlager
- Occupation(s): Songwriter, musician
- Instrument: drums
- Years active: early 1980s–2024
- Labels: Lionheart
- Formerly of: Bhonus, Flamingokvintetten

Ulf Georg Georgsson (22 April 1962 – 23 March 2024) was a Swedish songwriter, who participated at Melodifestivalen as a songwriter, and wrote songs recorded by, among others, Lasse Stefanz, Vikingarna, Playtones, Drifters, Zekes, CC & Lee, Black Jack, Barbados, Friends and Frøya.

== Biography ==
Ulf Georg Georgsson was born in Kinna Parish in former Älvsborg County, Sweden on 22 April 1962.

As a musician he played the drums in Flamingokvintetten since June 2013, after 30 years in Bhonus.

At Svensktoppen he became the second most successful composer in the year 2000, and was appointed "composer of the year" in 2001.

Georgsson died on 23 March 2024, at the age of 61.
