= Sweden in the Eurovision Song Contest 2009 =

- Eurovision Song Contest 2009
- Participating broadcaster: Sveriges Television (SVT)
- Country: Sweden
- Selection process: Melodifestivalen 2009
- Selection date: 14 March 2009

Competing entry
- Song: "La voix"
- Artist: Malena Ernman
- Songwriters: Fredrik Kempe; Malena Ernman

Placement
- Semi-final result: Qualified (4th, 105 points)
- Final result: 21st, 33 points

Participation chronology

Sweden was represented at the Eurovision Song Contest 2009 with "La voix", written by Fredrik Kempe and Malena Ernman, and performed by Ernman herself. The Swedish participating broadcaster, Sveriges Television (SVT), selected its entry through Melodifestivalen 2009.

Ernman represented Sweden at the first semi-final of the Contest on 12 May 2009, where she qualified to the final of the Contest after receiving 105 points, placing 4th in a field of 18 competing entries. At the final she performed 4th on stage. At the close of the voting she had received 33 points, placing 21st of the 25 competing countries.

== Before Eurovision ==
=== Melodifestivalen 2009 ===
Sveriges Television (SVT) held Melodifestivalen 2009 between February and March 2009. It was the selection for the 49th song to represent Sweden in the Eurovision Song Contest, and was the 48th Melodifestivalen. Five heats were held in the Swedish cities of Gothenburg, Skellefteå, Leksand, and Malmö, with Norrköping hosting the final Andra Chansen (Second Chance) round. The final was held at the Globe Arena in Stockholm, where 11 songs competed.

Melodifestivalen 2009 implemented a number of new rules which changed the dynamics of the contest, including more people, pre-recorded backing vocals and a new international jury who selected an 11th finalist.

==== Semi-finals and Second Chance round ====
- The first heat took place on 7 February 2009 at the Scandinavium in Gothenburg. "Stay the Night" performed by Alcazar and "You're My World" performed by Emilia qualified directly to the final, while "Snälla, snälla" performed by Caroline af Ugglas and "Jag tror på oss" performed by Scotts advanced to the Second Chance round. "Snälla, snälla" was also selected by the international jury to progress to the wildcard round. "Tick Tock" performed by Nina Söderquist, "Welcome to My Life" performed by Jonathan Fagerlund, "Med hjärtat fyllt av ljus" performed by Shirley Clamp, and "Disconnect Me" performed by Marie Serneholt were eliminated from the contest.
- The second heat took place on 14 February 2009 at the Skellefteå Kraft Arena in Skellefteå. "Hope & Glory" performed by Måns Zelmerlöw and "1000 Miles" performed by H.E.A.T qualified directly to the final, while "It's My Life" performed by Amy Diamond and "Show Me Heaven" performed by Lili & Susie advanced to the Second Chance round. "It's My Life" was also selected by the international jury to progress to the wildcard round. "Jag ska slåss i dina kvarter!" performed by Lasse Lindh and Band, "Never Been Here Before" performed by Jennifer Brown, "Kärlekssång från mig" performed by Markoolio, and "What If" performed by Cookies 'N' Beans were eliminated from the contest.
- The third heat took place on 21 February 2009 at the Ejendals Arena in Leksand. "Baby Goodbye" performed by E.M.D. and "Så vill stjärnorna" performed by Molly Sandén qualified directly to the final, while "You're Not Alone" performed by BWO and "I Got U" performed by Rigo and the Topaz Sound feat. Red Fox advanced to the Second Chance round. "Alla" performed by Sofa was selected by the international jury to progress to the wildcard round. "The Queen" performed by Velvet, "Du vinner över mig" performed by Mikael Rickfors, and "Här för mig själv" performed by Maja Gullstrand were eliminated from the contest.
- The fourth heat took place on 28 February 2009 at the Malmö Arena in Malmö. "La voix" performed by Malena Ernman and "Love Love Love" performed by Agnes qualified directly to the final, while "Higher" performed by Star Pilots and "Moving On" performed by Sarah Dawn Finer advanced to the Second Chance round. "Moving On" was also selected by the international jury to progress to the wildcard round. "Du är älskad där du går" performed by Susanne Alfvengren, "Killing Me Tenderly" performed by Anna Sahlene and Maria Haukaas Storeng, "Sweet Kissin' in The Moonlight" performed by Thorleifs, and "Esta noche" performed by Next3 were eliminated from the contest.
- The Second Chance round (Andra chansen) took place on 7 March 2009 at the Himmelstalundshallen in Norrköping. "Moving On" performed by Sarah Dawn Finer and "Snälla, snälla" performed by Caroline af Ugglas qualified to the final. Of the two remaining songs eligible for the international jury wildcard, "Alla" performed by Sofia was selected to progress to the final.

==== Final ====
The final was held on 14 March at Globe Arena in Stockholm. 11 songs competed, with the winner being decided by a mix of televoting/SMS voting and jury voting. The final winner was Malena Ernman with the pop/opera song "La voix", composed by Ernman and last year's winning composer Fredrik Kempe, and was sung in both English and French. Ernman received top marks from the televoting public, and only came 8th with the juries. Second place went to Caroline af Ugglas with "Snälla, snälla", while third place went to boyband E.M.D. with "Baby Goodbye".

R/O	Artist	Song	Jury	Televote	Total	Place
1	Måns Zelmerlöw	"Hope & Glory"	96	48	144	4
2	Caroline af Ugglas	"Snälla, snälla"	51	120	171	2
3	Agnes	"Love Love Love"	40	0	40	8
4	H.E.A.T	"1000 Miles"	58	24	82	7
5	Emilia	"You're My World"	28	0	28	9
6	Alcazar	"Stay the Night"	67	72	139	5
7	Sarah Dawn Finer	"Moving On"	75	12	87	6
8	E.M.D.	"Baby Goodbye"	49	96	145	3
9	Sofia	"Alla" (Άλλα)	12	0	12	10
10	Molly Sandén	"Så vill stjärnorna"	2	0	2	11
11	Malena Ernman	"La voix"	38	144	182	1

== At Eurovision ==
Since Sweden is not one of the "Big Four" and was not the host of the 2009 contest, it had to compete in one of the two semi-finals.

Following a draw in Moscow, the Swedish entrant took part in the first semi-final on 12 May 2009, performing 5th. At the semifinal, Sweden's entry qualified for the final, which took place on May 16. while the draw for the running order was held on 16 March 2009. It finished 21st of 25 participants with just 33 points.

=== Voting ===
==== Points awarded to Sweden ====
Points awarded to Sweden (Semi-final 1)
Score	Country
12 points	
10 points	Finland; Iceland
8 points	Armenia; Malta; Portugal
7 points	Andorra; Belarus; Israel; United Kingdom
6 points	Czech Republic
5 points	
4 points	Belgium; Bosnia and Herzegovina; Germany; Romania; Switzerland; Turkey
3 points	Macedonia
2 points	
1 point	

Points awarded to Sweden (Final)
Score	Country
12 points	
10 points	
8 points	
7 points	Finland
6 points	Estonia
5 points	
4 points	Denmark; Malta; Norway
3 points	Iceland
2 points	Andorra; France
1 point	Albania

==== Points awarded by Sweden ====
Points awarded by Sweden (Semi-final 1)
Score	Country
12 points	Iceland
10 points	Finland
8 points	Bosnia and Herzegovina
7 points	Turkey
6 points	Israel
5 points	Armenia
4 points	Malta
3 points	Portugal
2 points	Switzerland
1 point	Belarus

Points awarded by Sweden (Final)
Score	Country
12 points	Norway
10 points	Iceland
8 points	Azerbaijan
7 points	Estonia
6 points	Turkey
5 points	Bosnia and Herzegovina
4 points	Finland
3 points	Armenia
2 points	Greece
1 point	Albania

==== Detailed voting results ====
Detailed voting results from Sweden (Semi-final 1)
R/O	Country	Televotes	Rank	Points
01	Montenegro	2,988	11	
02	Czech Republic	831	16	
03	Belgium	1,655	15	
04	Belarus	3,200	10	1
05	Sweden			
06	Armenia	7,397	6	5
07	Andorra	2,676	13	
08	Switzerland	4,251	9	2
09	Turkey	13,685	4	7
10	Israel	8,621	5	6
11	Bulgaria	725	17	
12	Iceland	35,994	1	12
13	Macedonia	2,986	12	
14	Romania	2,594	14	
15	Finland	31,988	2	10
16	Portugal	4,394	8	3
17	Malta	4,820	7	4
18	Bosnia and Herzegovina	30,688	3	8

Detailed voting results from Sweden (Final)
R/O	Country	Results					Points
R/O	Country	Jury	Televoting			Combined	Points
R/O	Country	Jury	Votes	Rank	Points	Combined	Points
01	Lithuania		7,446	19			
02	Israel		9,457	13			
03	France		4,916	21			
04	Sweden						
05	Croatia		3,752	23			
06	Portugal		7,894	17			
07	Iceland	12	58,151	2	10	22	10
08	Greece	6	14,450	11		6	2
09	Armenia	5	15,918	10	1	6	3
10	Russia		3,810	22			
11	Azerbaijan	8	39,145	5	6	14	8
12	Bosnia and Herzegovina		57,818	3	8	8	5
13	Moldova		6,131	20			
14	Malta		8,535	14			
15	Estonia	7	24,244	8	3	10	7
16	Denmark		26,635	7	4	4	
17	Germany	2	7,930	16		2	
18	Turkey	4	33,709	6	5	9	6
19	Albania	3	20,698	9	2	5	1
20	Norway	10	136,171	1	12	22	12
21	Ukraine	1	8,229	15		1	
22	Romania		7,638	18			
23	United Kingdom		12,854	12			
24	Finland		47,722	4	7	7	4
25	Spain		3,672	24			
