= Moving On (Sarah Dawn Finer song) =

Single by Sarah Dawn Finer

from the album Moving On
- A-side: "Moving On"
- Released: 28 February 2009
- Recorded: Roxy Recordings
- Genre: gospel, soul
- Songwriter(s): Fredrik Kempe, Sarah Dawn Finer

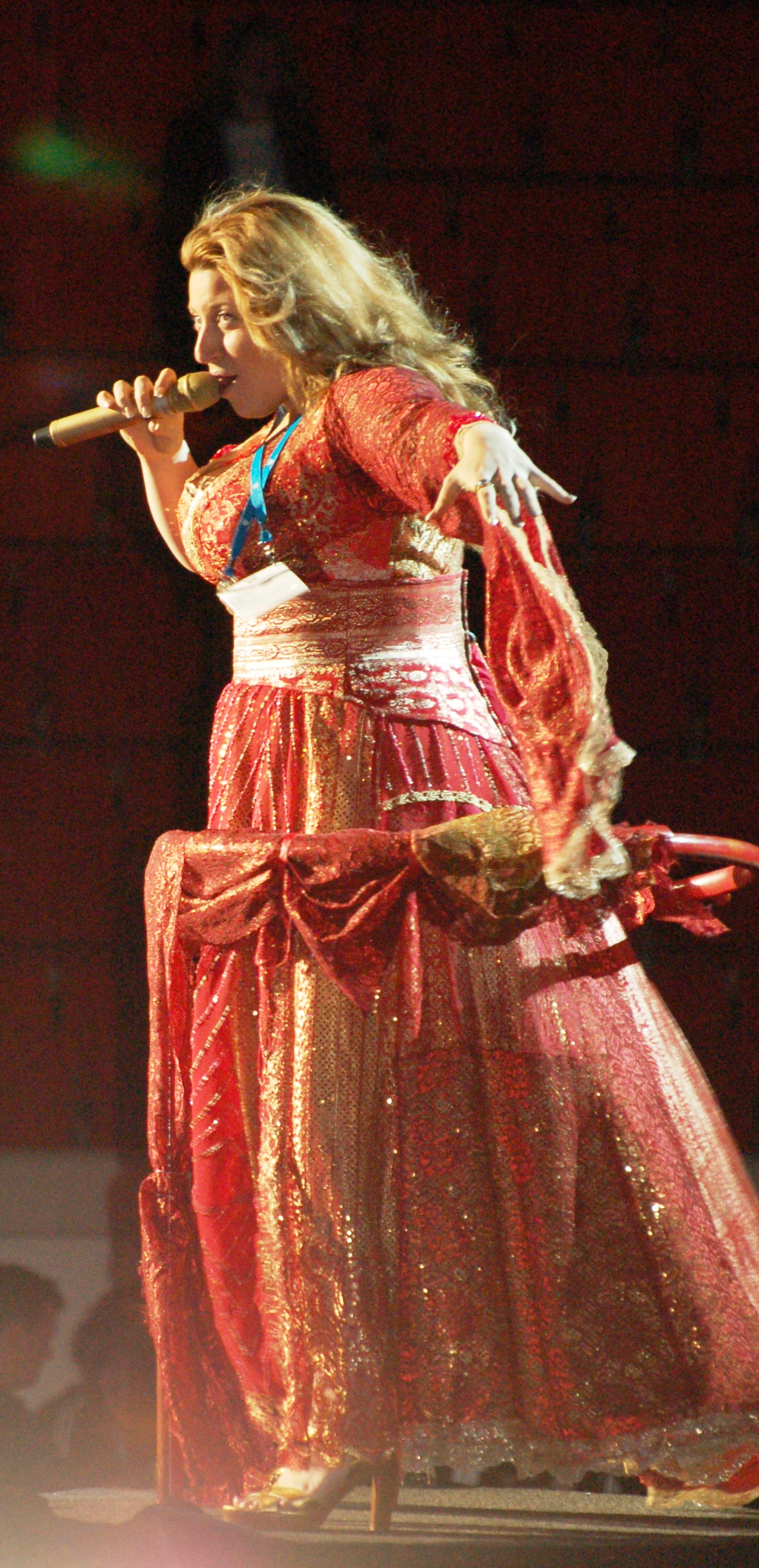
Sarah Dawn Finer performing Moving On at Melodifestivalen 2009.

"Moving On" is a song written by Fredrik Kempe and Sarah Dawn Finer, and performed by Sarah Dawn Finer at Melodifestivalen 2009, where it ended up 6th.

The song participated in the 4th semifinal in Malmö on 28 February 2009, dueling against Malena Ernman's song "La Voix" that reached the final. Sarah Dawn Finer's song reached "Andra chansen" in Norrköping on 7 March 2009. The song also became the choice of the international jury. At Andra chansen the song dueled against Scotts' "Jag tror på oss" and Lili & Susie's "Show Me Heaven", but managed to reach the finals together with Caroline af Ugglas's song "Snälla, snälla".

The song also charted at Svensktoppen, entering on 19 April 2009 where it stayed for 22 weeks. before leaving the chart in late September 2009.

== Charts ==
=== Weekly charts ===
| Chart (2009) | Peak position |
|---|---|
| Sweden (Sverigetopplistan) | 3 |

=== Year-end charts ===
| Chart (2009) | Position |
|---|---|
| Sweden (Sverigetopplistan) | 32 |
