= Dimitri Stassos =

Greek-Swedish songwriter

Dimitri Stassos (Greek: Δημήτρη Στασσος; born 1969 in Stockholm, Sweden), is a Greek-Swedish songwriter known for his entries in the Eurovision Song Contest as well as writing hits for Ola Svensson and others.

== Career ==
He has been working professionally as a songwriter, producer, and a musician for many years, signed to Warner Chappell Scandinavia.

He has gained success in the Swedish Eurovision Song Contest as a composer and producer four times, composed Spain's contribution "La noche es para mí", performed by Soraya, in the Eurovision Song Contest 2009, as well as co-writing the song "Aphrodisiac", performed by Eleftheria Eleftheriou, which represented Greece in the Eurovision Song Contest 2012 in Baku.

On the Swedish market Dimitri has worked with "Idol" star Ola Svensson, resulting in three number one singles, "Unstoppable (co-written), "Overdrive" and "I´m In Love" (co-written by Shellback and Alexander Kronlund). He composed two songs and produced six songs on Eric Saade's debut album "Masquerade", which made it to number one on the Swedish album chart. Dimitri has also worked with Sibel, Måns Zelmerlöw, Linda Sundblad, Danny Saucedo and many more.

Outside the Swedish market Dimitri has gained success in various countries. On the Spanish market he has written and produced for Soraya, David Bustamante (Platinum album) and David Bisbal (3× Platinum). The David Bisbal song also featured British pop star Pixie Lott.

On the Greek market, Dimitri wrote and produced the songs "Sose Me (Lights On)" and "Gelaei" (Gold album "Kalokairi Stin Kardia") for artist Ivi Adamou, and the songs "Ase Me" and "Stavrolekso" for artist Eleni Foureira, (Platinum album).

== Eurovision Entries ==
- "La noche es para mí" by Soraya Arnelas (Spain 2009), 24th place (final)
- "Aphrodisiac" by Eleftheria Eleftheriou (Greece 2012), 17th place (final)

== Entries in national Eurovision pre-selections ==
- "Hypnotized" by Sofia (Sweden 2007), 7th place (semi-final)
- "Alla" by Sofia (Sweden 2009), 10th place
- "La noche es para mí" by Soraya Arnelas (Spain 2009), 1st place
- "Unstoppable" by Ola Svensson (Sweden 2010), 7th place
- "Stop" by Sibel Redžep (Sweden 2010), 7th place (semi-final)
- "Aphrodisiac" by Eleftheria Eleftheriou (Greece 2012), 1st place
- "Waterfall" by Joni (Hungary 2014), 9th place (semi-final)
- (Republic of Ireland) "Memories (In Melody)" by Nikki Kavanagh (Ireland 2015), 4th place
- "Empty Hearted" by Domenique (Malta 2016), eliminated (semi-final)
- "The Wrong Kind" by Veronicas Illusion (Denmark 2016), Finalist
- "Don't Wake Me Up" by Tuuli Okkonen (Finland 2016), 9th place
- "A.S.A.P." by Johanna Beijbom (Denmark 2017), 3rd place
- "Čudo" by Goga Stanić (Serbia 2019), 8th place (semi-final)
- "Die for You" by Catarina Sandu (Moldova 2020), 4th place
- "Into the Fire" by Nicole Azzopardi (Malta 2022), 3rd place
- "Contrasens" by Reghina Alexandrina (Moldova 2024), 6th place
- "Play It!" by Xannova Xan (Greece 2025), 5th place
- "You Are the Fire" by Stella Kay (Greece 2026), eliminated (semi-final)
