= Melodifestivalen 2009 =

Swedish music competition

Dates and venue
- Heat 1: 7 February 2009
- Heat 2: 14 February 2009
- Heat 3: 21 February 2009
- Heat 4: 28 February 2009
- Second chance: 7 March 2009
- Final: 14 March 2009

Organisation
- Broadcaster: Sveriges Television (SVT)
- Presenter: Petra Mede

Participants
- Number of entries: 32
- Number of finalists: 11

Vote
- Voting system: Heats and Second chance: 100% public vote, one finalist selected by international jury Final: 50% public vote, 50% jury vote
- Winning song: "La Voix" by Malena Ernman

Melodifestivalen 2009 was the 49th edition of the Swedish music competition Melodifestivalen, which was organised by Sveriges Television (SVT) and took place over a six-week period between 7 February and 14 March 2009. The winner of the competition was Malena Ernman with the song "La Voix", who represented Sweden in the Eurovision Song Contest 2009, where she came twenty-first with 33 points.

== Format ==
For the 2009 contest a number of changes were made to this format: the first four heats now included a duel format, with the top four songs competing against each other for a place in the final - the 1st and 4th-placed songs and the 2nd and 3rd-placed songs battled against each other, with the winning songs, as decided by another public vote, qualifying to the final, while the losing songs took part in the Second Chance round.

Additionally, a maximum of eight people were allowed on stage, an increase from the previous maximum of six. Pre-recorded backing vocals were now allowed to be included on the songs' backing tracks, however the main vocals were still required to be performed on stage.

This year also marked the introduction of an "international jury". The jury consisted of 12 members, who all work within the music industry, with many of them involved in Eurovision. The international jury selected one song from each heat that did not qualify to the final, focusing their decision on their suitability for Eurovision. After the Second Chance round had finished, the jury selected their preferred song from the remaining entries, which qualified to the final, becoming the 11th finalist. The international jury also voted during the final of the contest, becoming the 12th jury, alongside the 11 regional juries of Sweden.

Competition Schedule
Show	Date	City	Venue
Heat 1	7 February 2009	Gothenburg	Scandinavium
Heat 2	14 February 2009	Skellefteå	Skellefteå Kraft Arena
Heat 3	21 February 2009	Leksand	Ejendals Arena
Heat 4	28 February 2009	Malmö	Malmö Arena
Second chance	7 March 2009	Norrköping	Himmelstalundshallen
Final	14 March 2009	Stockholm	Ericsson Globe

=== Stage design ===
The stage of the contest

The first plans of the stage were made during the summer of 2008 and was, for the third time, designed by Viktor Brattström, with the intention to provide a feeling of endlessness: "The audience will get the feeling of not knowing where the stage starts or ends, not knowing what's coming up around the corner".

The green room, where the artists rested after their performances, was altered from previous contests. Instead of competing artists and composers sitting together at tables, artists sat together on sofas beside the stage, while composers sat together in the front rows of the audience.

=== Wildcards ===
Starting in 2004, four out of the 32 participants were selected directly by the contest's producers, in order to increase musical and artistic breadth. Each artist, called "wildcard", participated in a different heat. The wildcards in 2009 were the following:

Artist	Song	Heat
Marie Serneholt	"Disconnect Me"	Heat 1
Markoolio	"Kärlekssång från mig"	Heat 2
E.M.D.	"Baby Goodbye"	Heat 3
Malena Ernman	"La Voix"	Heat 4

== Competing entries ==
A record-breaking 3,440 songs were submitted to the competition, with only 28 proceeding to the next round. The final 28 songs chosen to compete in the heats were released by SVT on 14 October, along with the names of their authors.

Artist	Song	Songwriter(s)
Agnes	"Love Love Love"	Anders Hansson
Alcazar	"Stay the Night"	Anders Hansson; Andreas Lundstedt; Lina Hedlund; Mårten Sandén; Tess Merkel
Amy Diamond	"It's My Life"	Alexander Bard; Bobby Ljunggren; Oscar Holter
Anna Sahlene & Maria Haukaas Storeng	"Killing Me Tenderly"	Amir Aly; Henrik Wikström; Tobbe Petterssen
BWO	"You're Not Alone"	Alexander Bard; Anders Hansson; Fredrik Kempe
Caroline af Ugglas	"Snälla, snälla"	Caroline af Ugglas; Heinz Liljedahl
Cookies 'N' Beans	"What If"	Amir Aly; Maciel Numhauser; Robin Abrahamsson
E.M.D.	"Baby Goodbye"	Danny Saucedo; Erik Segerstedt; Mattias Andréasson; Oscar Görres
Emilia	"You're My World"	Emilia Rydberg; Figge Boström
H.E.A.T	"1000 Miles"	David Stenmarck; Niklas Jarl
Jennifer Brown	"Never Been Here Before"	Jennifer Brown; Peter Kvint
Jonathan Fagerlund	"Welcome to My Life"	Didrik Thott; Samuel Waermö
Lasse Lindh och Bandet	"Jag ska slåss i dina kvarter!"	Lasse Lindh
Lili & Susie	"Show Me Heaven"	Calle Kindbom; Nestor Geli; Pär Lönn; Susie Päivärinta; Thomas G:son
Maja Gullstrand	"Här för mig själv"	Marcos Ubeda; Thomas G:son
Malena Ernman	"La Voix"	Fredrik Kempe; Malena Ernman
Måns Zelmerlöw	"Hope & Glory"	Fredrik Kempe; Henrik Wikström; Måns Zelmerlöw
Marie Serneholt	"Disconnect Me"	Peter Boström; Tony Nilsson
Markoolio	"Kärlekssång från mig"	Karl Eurén; Marko Lehtosalo; Patrik Henzel
Mikael Rickfors	"Du vinner över mig!"	Thomas G:son
Molly Sandén	"Så vill stjärnorna"	Bobby Ljunggren; Ingela Forsman; Marcos Ubeda
Next 3	"Esta noche"	Adam Soliman; Gonzalo Flores; Jimmy Almgren; Michael Xavier Barraza
Nina Söderquist	"Tick Tock"	Johan Lyander; Matti Alfonzetti
Rigo & The Topaz Sound feat. Red Fox	"I Got U"	Rodrigo Pencheff; Tobias Karlsson
Sarah Dawn Finer	"Moving On"	Fredrik Kempe; Sarah Dawn Finer
Scotts	"Jag tror på oss"	Ingela Forsman; Lars Diedricson; Martin Hedström
Shirley Clamp	"Med hjärtat fyllt av ljus"	Bobby Ljunggren; Henrik Wikström; Ingela Forsman
Sofia	"Alla"	Dimitri Stassos; Henrik Wikström; Irini Michas; Nina Karolidou
Star Pilots	"Higher"	Joakim Udd; Johan Becker; Johan Fjellström
Susanne Alfvengren	"Du är älskad där du går"	Bobby Ljunggren; Henrik Wikström; Ingela Forsman
Thorleifs	"Sweet Kissin' in the Moonlight"	Lina Eriksson; Mårten Eriksson
Velvet	"The Queen"	Henrik Janson; Tony Nilsson

== Contest overview ==
=== Heat 1 ===
The first heat took place on 7 February 2009 at the Scandinavium in Gothenburg. 3,294,000 viewers watched the heat live. A total of 721,334 votes were cast, with a total of SEK 1,396,108 collected for Radiohjälpen.

Round 1
R/O	Artist	Song	Votes			Place	Result	
R/O	Artist	Song	Round 1	Round 2	Total	Place	Result	
1	Nina Söderquist	"Tick Tock"	28,404	59,122	87,526	5	Out	
2	Jonathan Fagerlund	"Welcome to My Life"	20,847	—N/a	20,847	7	Out	
3	Shirley Clamp	"Med hjärtat fyllt av ljus"	11,542	—N/a	11,542	8	Out	
4	Scotts	"Jag tror på oss"	39,831	72,455	112,286	3	Round 2	
5	Emilia	"You're My World"	28,960	60,471	89,431	4	Round 2	
6	Alcazar	"Stay the Night"	40,913	77,368	118,281	1	Round 2	
7	Caroline af Ugglas	"Snälla, snälla"	32,839	84,451	117,290	2	I.J.	Round 2
8	Marie Serneholt	"Disconnect Me"	23,599	—N/a	23,599	6	Out	

Round 2
Duel	R/O	Artist	Song	Votes	Result	
I	1	Scotts	"Jag tror på oss"	63,208	Second chance	
I	2	Alcazar	"Stay the Night"	92,630	Final	
II	1	Emilia	"You're My World"	79,496	Final	
II	2	Caroline af Ugglas	"Snälla, snälla"	66,520	I.J.	Second chance

=== Heat 2 ===
The second heat took place on 14 February 2009 at the Skellefteå Kraft Arena in Skellefteå. 3,032,000 viewers watched the heat live. A total of 812,874 votes were cast, with a total of SEK 1,269,807 collected for Radiohjälpen.

Round 1
R/O	Artist	Song	Votes			Place	Result	
R/O	Artist	Song	Round 1	Round 2	Total	Place	Result	
1	Lili & Susie	"Show Me Heaven"	30,813	70,081	100,894	4	Round 2	
2	Lasse Lindh och Bandet	"Jag ska slåss i dina kvarter!"	9,084	—N/a	9,084	8	Out	
3	Jennifer Brown	"Never Been Here Before"	9,645	—N/a	9,645	7	Out	
4	H.E.A.T	"1000 Miles"	50,735	96,985	147,720	2	Round 2	
5	Markoolio	"Kärlekssång från mig"	14,704	—N/a	14,704	6	Out	
6	Amy Diamond	"It's My Life"	43,352	77,571	120,923	3	I.J.	Round 2
7	Cookies 'N' Beans	"What If"	33,490	64,613	98,103	5	Out	
8	Måns Zelmerlöw	"Hope & Glory"	74,821	129,621	204,442	1	Round 2	

Round 2
Duel	R/O	Artist	Song	Votes	Result	
I	1	H.E.A.T	"1000 Miles"	89,631	Final	
I	2	Amy Diamond	"It's My Life"	69,204	I.J.	Second chance
II	1	Måns Zelmerlöw	"Hope & Glory"	107,523	Final	
II	2	Lili & Susie	"Show Me Heaven"	67,859	Second chance	

=== Heat 3 ===
The third heat took place on 21 February 2009 at the Ejendals Arena in Leksand. 2,922,000 viewers watched the heat live. A total of 691,238 votes were cast, with a total of SEK 1,053,643 collected for Radiohjälpen.

Round 1
R/O	Artist	Song	Votes			Place	Result	
R/O	Artist	Song	Round 1	Round 2	Total	Place	Result	
1	Velvet	"The Queen"	15,985	—N/a	15,985	6	Out	
2	Rigo & The Topaz Sound feat. Red Fox	"I Got U"	18,515	38,078	56,593	4	Round 2	
3	Molly Sandén	"Så vill stjärnorna"	29,523	55,713	85,236	3	Round 2	
4	E.M.D.	"Baby Goodbye"	65,234	127,990	193,224	1	Round 2	
5	Mikael Rickfors	"Du vinner över mig!"	17,785	36,284	54,069	5	Out	
6	Maja Gullstrand	"Här för mig själv"	10,568	—N/a	10,568	8	Out	
7	Sofia	"Alla"	14,782	—N/a	14,782	7	I.J.	~~Out~~
8	BWO	"You're Not Alone"	41,082	80,414	121,496	2	Round 2	

Round 2
Duel	R/O	Artist	Song	Votes	Result
I	1	Rigo & The Topaz Sound feat. Red Fox	"I Got U"	39,124	Second chance
I	2	E.M.D.	"Baby Goodbye"	116,034	Final
II	1	BWO	"You're Not Alone"	66,520	Second chance
II	2	Molly Sandén	"Så vill stjärnorna"	85,886	Final

=== Heat 4 ===
The fourth heat took place on 28 February 2009 at the Malmö Arena in Malmö. 3,188,000 viewers watched the heat live. A total of 639,928 votes were cast, with a total of SEK 1,122,842 collected for Radiohjälpen.

Round 1
R/O	Artist	Song	Votes			Place	Result	
R/O	Artist	Song	Round 1	Round 2	Total	Place	Result	
1	Agnes	"Love Love Love"	27,501	61,082	88,583	2	Round 2	
2	Star Pilots	"Higher"	28,311	58,751	87,062	3	Round 2	
3	Susanne Alfvengren	"Du är älskad där du går"	7,530	—N/a	7,530	8	Out	
4	Anna Sahlene & Maria Haukaas Storeng	"Killing Me Tenderly"	17,240	—N/a	17,240	7	Out	
5	Thorleifs	"Sweet Kissin' in the Moonlight"	23,830	48 525	72,355	5	Out	
6	Sarah Dawn Finer	"Moving On"	27,394	57,776	85,170	4	I.J.	Round 2
7	Next 3	"Esta noche"	21,737	—N/a	21,737	6	Out	
8	Malena Ernman	"La Voix"	48,415	102,708	151,123	1	Round 2	

Round 2
Duel	R/O	Artist	Song	Votes	Result	
I	1	Star Pilots	"Higher"	54,785	Second chance	
I	2	Agnes	"Love Love Love"	66,740	Final	
II	1	Sarah Dawn Finer	"Moving On"	48,526	I.J.	Second chance
II	2	Malena Ernman	"La Voix"	88,870	Final	

=== Second chance ===
The second chance round took place on 7 March 2009 at the Himmelstalundshallen in Norrköping. 2,886,000 viewers watched the show live. A total of 639,928 votes were cast.

Round 1
Duel	R/O	Artist	Song	Votes	Result	
I	1	Scotts	"Jag tror på oss"	47,593	Out	
I	2	Sarah Dawn Finer	"Moving On"	88,739	I.J.	Round 2
II	1	Lili & Susie	"Show Me Heaven"	65,405	Round 2	
II	2	BWO	"You're Not Alone"	54,283	Out	
III	1	Amy Diamond	"It's My Life"	65,493	I.J.	~~Out~~
III	2	Star Pilots	"Higher"	84,671	Round 2	
IV	1	Rigo & The Topaz Sound feat. Red Fox	"I Got U"	49,543	Out	
IV	2	Caroline af Ugglas	"Snälla, snälla"	100,860	I.J.	Round 2

Round 2
Duel	R/O	Artist	Song	Votes	Result	
I	1	Sarah Dawn Finer	"Moving On"	98,984	I.J.	Final
I	2	Lili & Susie	"Show Me Heaven"	65,217	Out	
II	1	Star Pilots	"Higher"	107,425	Out	
II	2	Caroline af Ugglas	"Snälla, snälla"	111,009	I.J.	Final

==== International jury choice ====
The international jury had the task of selecting a song from each heat which they think was the most suitable for the Eurovision Song Contest. The jury were only able to pick songs that had not passed to the final. If they pick a song which qualifies to the final through the Second Chance round, that song became ineligible for the jury's choice. The international jury were also given the right to vote during the final of the contest, becoming the 12th jury, alongside the 11 regional juries.

Heat	Artist	Song	Result
Eligible entries
2	Amy Diamond	"It's My Life"	Out
3	Sofia	"Alla"	Final
Ineligible entries that already qualified to the final
1	Caroline af Ugglas	"Snälla, snälla"	—N/a
4	Sarah Dawn Finer	"Moving On"	—N/a

=== Final ===
The final took place on 14 March 2009 at the Ericsson Globe in Stockholm. 3,592,000 viewers watched the final live. A total of 1,748,970 votes were cast, with a total of SEK 3,457,435 collected for Radiohjälpen.

R/O	Artist	Song	Juries	Televote		Total	Place
R/O	Artist	Song	Juries	Votes	Points	Total	Place
1	Måns Zelmerlöw	"Hope & Glory"	96	182,651	48	144	4
2	Caroline af Ugglas	"Snälla, snälla"	51	318,952	120	171	2
3	Agnes	"Love Love Love"	40	49,819	0	40	8
4	H.E.A.T.	"1000 Miles"	58	178,283	24	82	7
5	Emilia	"You're My World"	28	48,844	0	28	9
6	Alcazar	"Stay the Night"	67	199,014	72	139	5
7	Sarah Dawn Finer	"Moving On"	75	146,300	12	87	6
8	E.M.D.	"Baby Goodbye"	49	231,098	96	145	3
9	Sofia	"Alla"	12	19,885	0	12	10
10	Molly Sandén	"Så vill stjärnorna"	2	51,467	0	2	11
11	Malena Ernman	"La Voix"	38	322,657	144	182	1

R/O	Song	International Jury	Regional Juries											Total
R/O	Song	International Jury	Luleå	Umeå	Sundsvall	Falun	Karlstad	Örebro	Norrköping	Gothenburg	Växjö	Malmö	Stockholm	Total
1	"Hope & Glory"	6	10	12	6	10	2	4	2	12	10	10	12	96
2	"Snälla, snälla"	10	12	8		4			6	4	6		1	51
3	"Love Love Love"		1	4	8	2	1			8		6	10	40
4	"1000 Miles"		2	6	2	1	12	2	4	1	8	12	8	58
5	"You're My World"	4				12		8			4			28
6	"Stay the Night"		6	10	12		10	1	10	10	1	1	6	67
7	"Moving On"	12	4	1	4	6	6	10	8	2	12	8	2	75
8	"Baby Goodbye"				10	8	8	12	1	6			4	49
9	"Alla"	8										4		12
10	"Så vill stjärnorna"	2												2
11	"La Voix"	1	8	2	1		4	6	12		2	2		38
Jury spokespersons
International jury – Marija Šerifović; Luleå – Soran Ismail; Umeå – Jan Bylund; Sundsvall – Tobias Persson; Falun – Måns Möller; Karlstad – Claudia Galli; Örebro – Thomas Oredsson; Norrköping – Jakob Öqvist; Gothenburg – Lasse Karlsson; Växjö – K.-G. Bergström; Malmö – Anna Granath; Stockholm – Thomas Järvheden

== Ratings ==
Viewing figures by show
Show	Air date	Viewers (millions)	Ref.
Heat 1	7 February 2009	3.294	
Heat 2	14 February 2009	3.032	
Heat 3	21 February 2009	2.922	
Heat 4	28 February 2009	3.188	
Second chance	7 March 2009	2.886	
Final	14 March 2009	3.592	

== See also ==
- Eurovision Song Contest 2009
- Sweden in the Eurovision Song Contest 2009
- Sweden in the Eurovision Song Contest
