= You're My World (disambiguation) =

You're My World is the English translation of the Italian ballad "Il mio mondo". The phrase may also refer to:

- "You're My World", a song by Emilia Rydberg from her 2009 album My World
- "(You're) My World", a song by Joe Satriani from his self-titled 1995 album
