= Figge Boström =

Swedish musician, songwriter and music producer

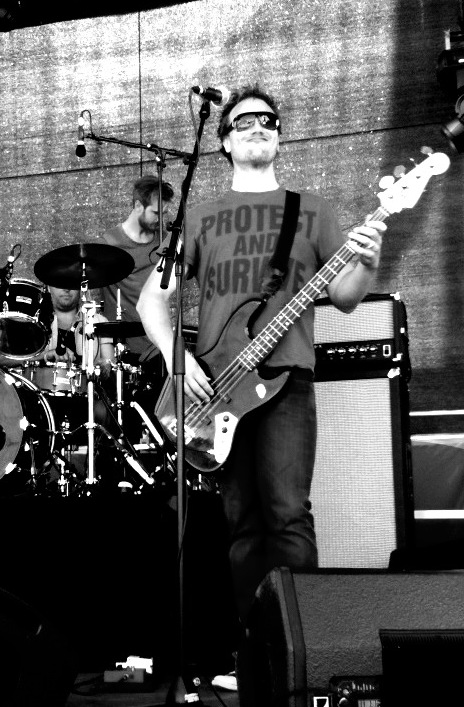

Background information
- Born: Fredrik Håkan Boström; 11 November 1969 (age 55)
- Origin: Sweden
- Genres: Pop; Eurodance; Teen pop Disco
- Occupation(s): Musician; Music producer Songwriter
- Years active: Since 1990
- Labels: Catfish Records
- Website: Studio Catfarm Music

Fredrik "Figge" Boström (born 11 November 1969 in Stockholm) is a Swedish musician, songwriter and music producer.

== Eurovision Song Contest (national entries) ==
Year	Country	Song	Artist	Written by	Notes
2007	Sweden	"Drop Dead"	Missmatch	Figge Boström / Woody/Woody/Persson/Grauers	Eliminated in the semi-finals
2009	Sweden	"You're My World"	Emilia Rydberg	Figge Boström / Emilia Rydberg	9th place
2011	Sweden	"Spring För Livet"	Sara Varga	Figge Boström / Sara Varga	9th place
2011	Sweden	"In The Club"	Danny Saucedo	Figge Boström / Peter Boström / Danny Saucedo	2nd place
2012	Sweden	"Amazing"	Danny Saucedo	Figge Boström / Peter Boström / Danny Saucedo	2nd place
2012	Norway	"Stay"	Tooji	Figge Boström / Peter Boström / Tooji	Winner of Melodi Grand Prix in Norway 2012. Competing in ESC in Baku May 2012
2012	Sweden	"The Boy Can Dance"	Afro-Dite	Figge Boström / Catrine Loqvist / Johan Lindman	5th place in the semi-finals
2012	Sweden	"Salt & Pepper"	Marie Serneholt	Figge Boström / Mårten Eriksson / Lina Eriksson	6th place in the semi-finals

== Discography ==
- 1998 Meja - Seven Sisters - All´bout The Money, Too Many Nigh's Late, Caught Up In The Middle - bass
- 1998 Meja - Radio Radio - Japan single - producer
- 1999 Eiko Masumoto (Jpn) - From The First Touch - bass
- 1999 Eva Dahlgren - La La Live - bass
- 1999 Orup - Elva Hjärtan - producer
- 2000 André De Lang - Educate Your Soul - Sunshine, Educate Your Soul, Could You Be (My Favourite Girl), Finally, For Your Love - co-writer
- 2000 Emilia Rydberg - Girlfriend, If It's Gonna Be U - producer
- 2000 Real Group - Commonly Unique - groove consultant
- 2001 Eva Dahlgren - Too Many Beliefs - single - producer
- 2001 Bosson - One In A Million - bass
- 2002 No Angels (Ger)- Still in Love with You - co-writer
- 2002 Afro-Dite - Celebration, MamaLou, Since Your Love Has Gone, Clap Your hands - co-writer - producer
- 2003 Nikki Cleary (UK)- Fish Out Of Water - bass
- 2003 Nektarios (Ger)- Look Like We Made It - bass
- 2003 Fame Factory Volym 6 - Modupeh Sowe - Jump Around - producer
- 2003 Magnus Bäcklund - Higher - producer
- 2004 Fame Factory Volym 7 - Modupeh Sowe - Hand In Hand - Karl Martindahl - Call You - producer
- 2004 Modupeh Sowe - Easy Come Easy Go, Movi´n - producer - co-writer
- 2004 IDOL - Darin - Unbreak My Heart - Cornelia - What It Feels Like To Be A Girl - producer
- 2004 Bosson - You Opened My Eyes - bass
- 2005 Carola - Genom Allt - bass
- 2005 Eric Bibb (US) - I'll Never Lose You - co-writer - co-producer
- 2006 Micke Syd - Du och och Glenn Hysén - bass - co-producer
- 2006 Eric Burdon (UK) - Feeling Blue - co-writer
- 2006 Eric Bibb (US) - Shine On - co-writer - bass
- 2006 Cotton Club - Christmas Cocktails - Papa Dee, Charlotte Perrelli, Jan Johansen, Pernilla Wahlgren, Sara Löfgren, Afro-Dite - musician - producer
- 2007 Bosson - Simple Man Wishing - background vocals
- 2007 André De Lang - Homecoming - bass - Record Label: Catfish Records
- 2007 Magnus Carlsson - Kom Hem - discoremix
- 2008 DBSK - Clap! - composer
- 2008 Charlotte Perrelli - Hero, Bullet, Addicted - co-writer
- 2008 Ola Svensson - Can't Get Enough, Feelgood, Love in Stereo - co-writer, bass
- 2014 Girls' Generation-TTS (KOR) - Holler - co-writer, co-producer
- 2017 Helene Fischer (GER) - Flieger, Sonne auf der Haut, Sowieso - co-writer
- 2022 Girls' Generation (KOR) - Paper Plane - co-writer, co-producer
