= Fut i fejemøget =

Song by John Mogensen
- Language: Danish
- Released: 1971
- Genre: popular music
- Label: John Mogensen
- Songwriter: John Mogensen

Fut i fejemøget (rough translation: Things start hotting up) is a song written by John Mogensen, who recorded it in 1971. Ewert Ljusberg wrote lyrics in Swedish, as Sofia dansar go-go, recorded by Stefan Rüdén scoring a Svensktoppen hit for 16 weeks between 5 November 1972 and 18 February 1973, which included topping the chart.

The song was also recorded by Larz-Kristerz on 2007 album Stuffparty 3 [ and by Scotts on 2009 album Längtan . At Dansbandskampen 2009 the song was performed by Torgny Melins. Stockholm folk-pop band Tuk Tuk Rally recorded the song on the album Även vackra fåglar skiter, consisting of a live recording at Totalgalan on 18–19 October 1991 in Köping.
