= Vi gör det igen =

2010 Scotts studio album

Studio album by Scotts
- Released: April 21, 2010
- Recorded: Sing2music Studio, Lidköping, Sweden
- Genre: modern dansband music, dansband pop
- Length: 42.19
- Label: Mariann
- Producer: Roberto Mårdstam, Claes Linder

Scotts chronology
Längtan (2009)	Vi gör det igen (2010)

Vi gör det igen was released on 21 April 2010, and is a studio album by Scotts.

The album consists of a recording of the song "In a Moment Like This", Denmark's Eurovision Song Contest 2010 entry, here performed by Scotts as a duet with Erica Sjöström from the Drifters, and a recording of The Playtones song "Sofie" from the Dansbandskampen 2009 finals. The album also consists of a recording of the 1966 Sven-Ingvars song, "Kristina från Vilhelmina".

The song "Jag ångrar ingenting" charted at Svensktoppen for one week on 25 July 2010, before getting knocked out of chart.

== Track listing ==
#	Title	Writer	Length
1.	"Jag ångrar ingenting"	Mikael Persson, Erik Mårtensson, Peter Karlsson	3.41
2.	"Vi gör det igen"	Thomas Thörnholm, Danne Attlerud	2.41
3.	"In a Moment Like This" (with Erica Sjöström from the Drifters)	Henrik Sethsson, Thomas G:sson, Erik Bernholm	3.02
4.	"Sommaren var vi"	Richard Larsson, Björn Strid, David Andersson	3.32
5.	"Beautiful Sunday"	Daniel Broone, Rod McQueen	2.57
6.	"Malena"	Johan Hamsås	2.58
7.	"Tillbaks med framtiden"	Martin "E-Type" Eriksson	2.49
8.	"Ingen kan älska som vi"	Roger Hansson, Mikael Lundgren, Klas Bergvall, Jan Persson, Chris Lancelot	3.56
9.	"Kristina från Vilhelmina"	Rune Wallebom	3.43
10.	"Jennie"	Henrik Sethsson, Pontus Assarsson	3.02
11.	"När vi har landat"	Martin Hägglund, Johan Skog	3.33
12.	"Sofie"	Henrik Sethsson, Thomas G:son	2.54
13.	"Bara du"	Henrik Sethsson, Mats Tärnfors	3.29

== Personnel ==
- Henrik Strömberg - vocals, guitar
- Claes Linder - keyboards, choir
- Roberto Mårdstam - bass, choir
- Per-Erik "Lillen" Tagesson - drums
- Production and arrangement: Roberto Mårdstam, Claes Linder
- Song production/Choir arrangement: Henrik Sethsson
- Recorded in Studio Scotts, Lidköping, Sweden
- Mixed by: Plec i Panicroom
- Engineer assistant: Ermin Harmidović
- Executive producer: Bert Karlsson
- The song "Jennie" produced and arranged by Henrik Sethsson och Pontus Assarsson and mixed by Jörgen Ringqvist
- Photography: Karin Törnblom
- Graphic form: R & R Reproduktion.se

== Charts ==
Chart (2008–2009)	Peak position
Sweden	4
