= Längtan (Scotts album) =

Studio album by Scotts
- Released: 29 July 2009
- Recorded: Sing2music Studio, Lidköping, Sweden
- Genre: modern dansband music, dansband pop
- Length: 42.52
- Label: Mariann
- Producer: Roberto Mårdstam, Claes Linder

Scotts chronology
Upp till dans (2009)	Längtan (2009)	Vi gör det igen (2010)

Längtan was released on 29 July 2009, and is a Scotts studio album. On 7 August 2009, the album topped the Swedish albums chart only to have sold over 20 000 copies circa two weeks later, leading to the band being awarded a golden record.

The song Underbar charted at Svensktoppen for two weeks between 23-30 August 2009.

== Track listing ==
#	Title	Weiter	Length
1.	"Längtan"	Jonas Hamsås, Jessica Jarl, Marcus Öhrn	2.55
2.	"Hon vill ha mera"	Pontus Assarsson, Henrik Sethsson, Claes Linder	3.41
3.	"Sofia dansar go-go (Fut i fejemøget)"	John Mogensen, Ewert Ljusberg	2.48
4.	"Underbar"	Pontus Assarsson, Jörgen Ringqvist, Daniel Barkman	2.54
5.	"Vilken natt"	Pontus Assarsson, Henrik Sethsson	3.13
6.	"Jag är förlorad (Making Your Mind Up)"	John Danter, Andy Hill, Camilla Andersson	2.45
7.	"Saturday Night"	Pontus Assarsson, Lasse Andersson	3.05
8.	"60's medley"		5.36
8. 1	"Let's Twist Again"	Karl Mann, David Appell	
8. 2	"Let's Dance"	Jim Lee	
8. 3	"Do You Wanna Dance?"	Bobby Freeman	
8. 4	"Runaway"	Max Crook, Del Shannon	
8. 5	"Pretty Woman"	Roy Orbison, Bill Daes	
8. 6	"Burning Love"	Dennis Linde	
8. 7	"Sweet Little Sheila"	Dieter Bohlen	
8. 8	"Hippy Hippy Shake"	Chan Romero	
9.	"Inget stoppar oss nu (i natt i natt)"	Lasse Holm, Ingela "Pling" Forsman	3.32
10.	"Suzy's sång"	Stefan Brunzell, Staffan Karlsson, Ulf Georgsson	3.09
11.	"Obladi Oblada"	Paul McCartney, John Lennon	3.02
12.	"En sista dans"	Pontus Assarsson, Henrik Sethsson, Claes Linder, Jimmy Lindberg	3.08
13.	"Jag tror på oss" ("bonus track")	Lars "Dille" Diedricson, Martin Hedström, Ingela "Pling" Forsman	3.02

=== Personnel ===
- Henrik Strömberg - vocals, guitar
- Claes Linder - keyboard, choir
- Roberto Mårdstam - bass, choir
- Per-Erik "Lillen" Tagesson - drums
- Production and arrangement: Roberto Mårdstam, Claes Linder
- Song producer/Choir arrangement: Henrik Sethsson
- Wind arrangement: Tore Berglund
- Mixed by: Plec i Panicroom
- Engineers: Plec och Andreas Rickstrand
- Sax: Martin Lindqvist, Tore Berglund
- Trumpet: Kart Olandersson, Johan Lindeborg
- Photo: Karin Törnblom
- Graphic form: R & R Reproduktion.se

== Charts ==
=== Weekly charts ===
Chart (2009)	Peak position
Swedish Albums (Sverigetopplistan)	1

=== Year-end charts ===
Chart (2009)	Position
Swedish Albums (Sverigetopplistan)	66
