= Kristina från Vilhelmina =

Single by Sven-Ingvars
- A-side: "Kristina från Vilhelmina"
- B-side: "Barndomshemmet" ("On the Banks of the Wabash, Far Away")
- Released: March 1966
- Label: Svensk-American
- Songwriter: Rune Wallebom

Kristina från Vilhelmina is a song written by Rune Wallebom, and originally recorded by Sven-Ingvars and released as a single in March 1966. The same month, the song was also included on the band's EP record Fyra hits. This version was tested for Svensktoppen, where it stayed for 12 weeks during the period 4 June-20 August 1966, and also topped the chart. Sven-Ingvars also did a 1990 re-recording for the album På begäran.

In 1967, the song was recorded by Anders Dahls orkester on the EP record Kristina från Vilhelmina.

Botten stars recorded the song in 1983 for the album I gamla parken. The same year it was performed by Mats Olofsson as B-side for the single Rekordmagasinet.

In 1993, the song was performed by Eric Donell & Zamira Hedström as a B-side for the single "De gamla kära sångerna", where a recording of Violen från Flen acted as A-side. In 1997, it was recorded by James Last at In Scandinavia and in 2000, Nisse Eriksson recorded it as a B-side for the single Nisses musicbox.

In 2010, Scotts recorded the song on the album Vi gör det igen.
