= Lili Päivärinta =

Swedish singer

Inga-Lill Kristina "Lili" Päivärinta (born 5 January 1966) is a Swedish singer and artist of Finnish ancestry.

== Career ==
She scored a number of hits with the duo Lili & Susie, a duo with her sister Susie Päivärinta, in the 1980s and early 1990s, several of which made the Swedish music charts.

Päivärinta has been a strong proponent of animal rights since she was a child. During 2000, Päivärinta filmed how she cared for animals, which resulted in a mini-series on TV4 that eventually lead to the long-running TV4 animal show Djurens Ö, where she showcases her job as an animal lifesaver. She is a vegetarian. Themes about animal rights have been featured regularly in Päivärinta's music and videos. She contributed to the album Building On Tradition by Andy McCoy. She also appeared as a regular in the TV-series Djurens hjältar broadcast on TV3.

== See also ==
- List of Swedes in music
