= Wake Up World =

Single by Karl Martindahl, Daniel Karlsson, and Robin Bengtsson
- Released: 2008
- Songwriter(s): Erik Anjou
- Producer(s): Keith Almgren

"Wake Up World" is the 2008 official single for the Swedish charity Hjälp Haiti ("Help Haiti"). The song was written by Erik Anjou and interpreted by Karl Martindahl, Daniel Karlsson and Robin Bengtsson. The initiative for the song was by Andreas Wistrand of the band Highlights. Songwriter Erik Anjou and music producer Keith Almgren donated all proceeds of the song to FRII (making up 103 organizations).

== Hjälp Haiti ==
"Hjälp Haiti" was a collection of 14 different organisations engaged in helping Haiti after its earthquake. Under FRII, (Frivilligorganisationernas Insamlingsråd) and TV4 Group, the organizations included:

- ActionAid
- Erikshjälpen
- Frälsningsarmén (The Salvation Army)
- Hoppets Stjärna
- Läkarmissionen,
- Plan Sverige
- PMU InterLife
- Rädda Barnen (Save the Children)
- Röda Korset (The Red Cross)
- Skandinaviska Barnmissionen
- SOS-Barnbyar (SOS Children's Villages)
- Svenska FN-förbundet
- Svenska Kyrkan (Church of Sweden)
- Unicef Sverige.

== Participating artists ==
Artists involved in the project included:

- Karl Martindahl, Daniel Karlsson and Robin Bengtsson - vocals
- Fredrik Wännman and Lars Norgren / Ramtitam - recorded, mixed and mastering
- Kristoffer Folin - assistant technician
- Johan Bergqvist - guitar and keyboard
- Mårten Bengtsson - bass
- Fredrik Svensson - drums
- Johannes Lagtun and Kristoffer Folin - disc cover

== Performances ==
The song was performed live on TV4 television station's program Nyhetsmorgon with Andreas Wistrand made the presentation alongside Maria Ros Jernberg, communications manager of FRII.
