= Samma himmel =

Studio album by Molly Sandén
- Released: 27 May 2009
- Genre: Pop; schlager
- Length: 43 minutes
- Label: Warner Music Sweden

Molly Sandén chronology
Samma himmel (2009)	Unchained (2012)

Samma himmel is the debut studio album by Molly Sandén, released in 2009.

== Track listing ==
No.	Title	Length
1.	"Kärlek"	3:46
2.	"Hallelujah"	4:10
3.	"Säg att det är regn"	4:09
4.	"Så vill stjärnorna"	3:04
5.	"Fånga en sommar"	3:35
6.	"Skör som glas"	3:18
7.	"Det är inte jag"	3:28
8.	"Stanna kvar"	3:27
9.	"Lova mig"	3:51
10.	"Samma himmel"	3:07
11.	"Mitt liv är mitt"	3:19
12.	"Gabriellas sång"	3:40

== Charts ==
Chart (2009)	Peak position
Swedish Albums (Sverigetopplistan)	16
