= It's My Life (Amy Diamond song) =

Single by Amy Diamond

from the album Swings and Roundabouts
- A-side: "It's My Life"
- B-side: "It's My Life" (karaoke/singback version)
- Released: March 2009
- Genre: Pop
- Label: Bonnier Music
- Songwriter(s): Alexander Bard, Oscar Holter, Bobby Ljunggren

Amy Diamond singles chronology
"Thank You" (2008)	"It's My Life" (2009)	"Up" (2009)

"It's My Life" is a song composed by Alexander Bard, Bobby Ljunggren and Oscar Holter. It was performed by Amy Diamond at Melodifestivalen 2009. The song was part of the second semi-final held at the Skellefteå Kraft Arena on 14 February 2009, and headed directly for Andra chansen, where the song was knocked out.

The single peaked number 14 on the Swedish singles chart.

== Charts ==
Chart (2009)	Peak position
Sweden (Sverigetopplistan)	14
