= Kärlekssång från mig =

Single by Markoolio
- Released: 2009
- Songwriter: Markoolio

Markoolio singles chronology
"The Markoolio Anthem" (2008)	"Kärlekssång från mig" (2009)	"Borta bra men hemma bäst" (2012)

"Kärlekssång från mig" is a ballad written by Patrik Henzel and Karl Eurén, and performed by Markoolio at Melodifestivalen 2009. The song participated in the second competition, inside the Skellefteå Kraft Arena on 14 February 2009, but was knocked out.

The single peaked at number 22 on the Swedish singles chart.

The song's lyrics describe things within Swedish popular music who aren't expected to appear, like a duet between Joakim Thåström and Carola Häggkvist, or Kent appearing during the Diggiloo tour, or that Markoolio should start singing love ballads.

== Charts ==
Chart (2009)	Peak position
Sweden (Sverigetopplistan)	22
