= Higher (Star Pilots song) =

Single by Star Pilots
- Released: 2009
- Genre: pop
- Songwriter(s): Johan Becker, Johan Fjellström, Joakim Udd

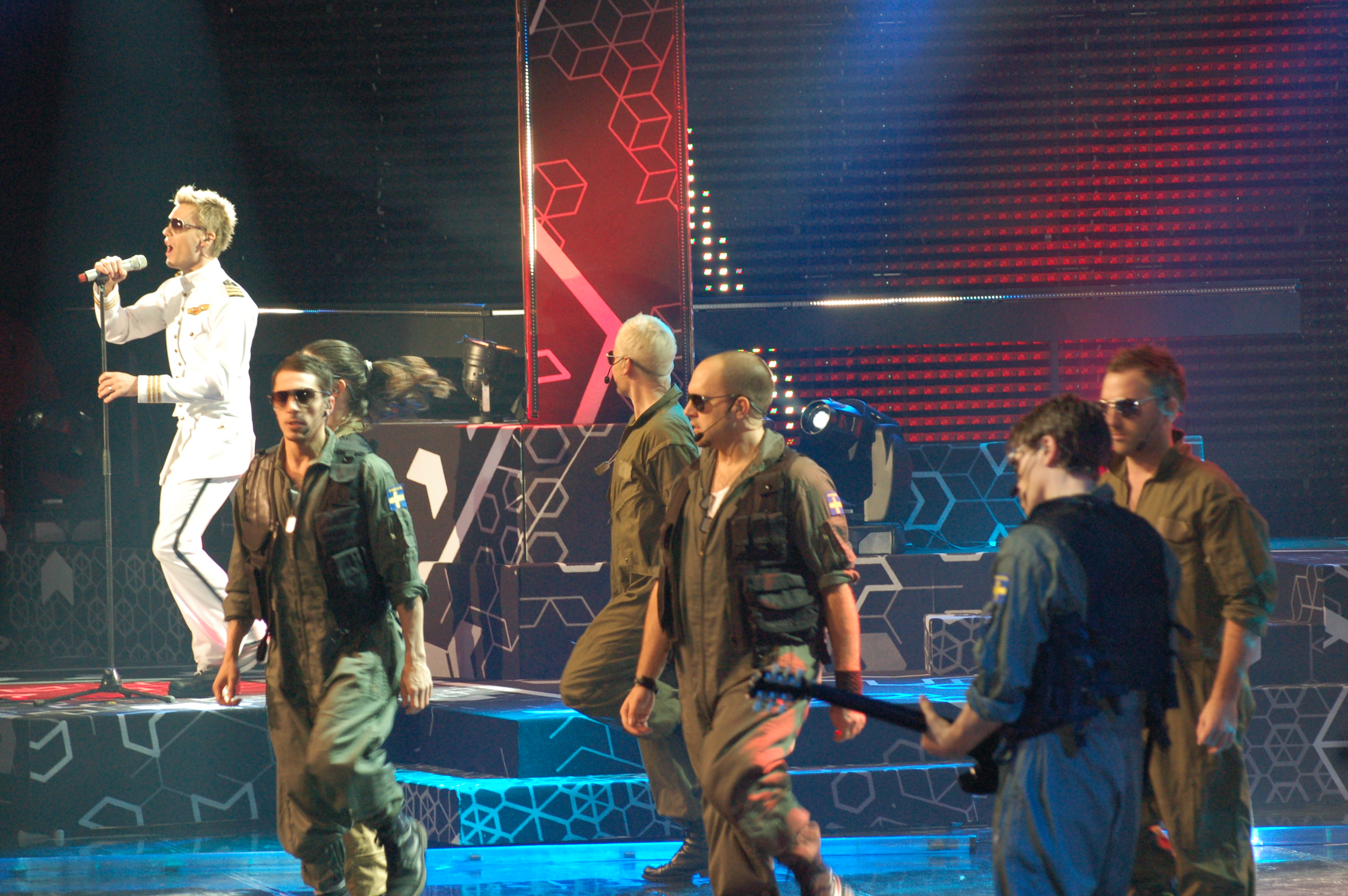
Star Pilots with the song "Higher" at Melodifestivalen 2009

"Higher" is a song written by Johan Fjellström, Joakim Udd and Johan Becker, and performed by Star Pilots at Melodifestivalen 2009. The song was performed in the 4th semifinal inside the Malmö Arena on 28 February 2009, and went further to Andra chansen where it ended up knocked out.

The single peaked at number 6 on the Swedish singles chart.

Several newspaper readers in Sweden blamed the song for being similar to the 1988 Boy Meets Girl song "Waiting For a Star to Fall" and the 2008 Jenny "Velvet" Petterssons song "Take My Body Close" as well as Survivors' 1982 song "Eye of the Tiger".

== Charts ==
=== Weekly charts ===
Chart (2009)	Peak position
Sweden (Sverigetopplistan)	6

=== Year-end charts ===
Chart (2009)	Position
Sweden (Sverigetopplistan)	36
