= The Wallstones =

Swedish musical duo

- Origin: Sweden
- Years active: 2004 – 2005
- Labels: Mar
- Members: Karl Martindahl; Johan Becker

The Wallstones was a Swedish musical duo formed in 2004 by Johan Becker, winner of the Fame Factory, a talent reality show in Sweden and Karl Martindahl another Fame Factory contestant. The Wallstones released their album Pleasure and Pain in 2005 and had three singles, "Good Old Stonecake" in 2004, and "C'mon Julie" in 2005.

== Melodifestivalen 2005 ==
The Wallstones duo made a bid to represent Sweden in the Eurovision Song Contest 2005 by taking part in the preselection contest Melodifestivalen 2005 with their song "Invisible People", written by Martindahl and Becker. But The Wallstones didn't make it to the final round of the contest.

== After break-up ==
After break-up of the duo, its members went on to pursue other musical careers. Karl Martindahl had some solo singles and later on formed the band Charlie Emm, alongside guitarist Ryan Roxie.

Johan Becker went on to form Star Pilots that took part in Melodifestivalen 2009 with "Higher". The band have hits both in Sweden and the United Kingdom particularly with "In the Heat of the Night" that reached #2 in Sweden and #21 in the UK.

=== Discography ===
==== Albums ====
- 2005: Pleasure and Pain

==== Singles ====
- 2004: "Good Old Stonecake" (reached #3 in Swedish Singles Chart)
- 2005: "Invisible People" (at Melodifestivalen 2005) (reached #6 in Swedish Singles Chart)
- 2005: "C'mon Julie"
