= 1000 Miles (H.E.A.T song) =

Single by H.E.A.T
- A-side: "1000 Miles"
- B-side: "1000 Miles (Karaoke Version)"
- Released: 2009
- Genre: heavy metal
- Songwriters: Nick Jarl, David Stenmarck
- Producers: Nick Jarl, David Stenmarck

"1000 Miles" is a song written by David Stenmarck and Nick Jarl and performed by Swedish rock band H.E.A.T. at Melodifestivalen 2009. Participating in the third semifinal inside the Skellefteå Kraft Arena on 14 February 2009, the song reached the final, ending up seventh.

The single peaked at third position at the Swedish singles chart. In April 2009, the song entered Svensktoppen.

== Contributors (H.E.A.T) ==
- Kenny Leckremo - lead vocals
- Dave Dalone - guitar
- Eric Rivers - guitar
- Jimmy Jay - bass
- Jona Tee - keyboards, backing vocals
- Don Crash - drums

== Charts ==
=== Weekly charts ===
Chart (2009)	Peak position
Sweden (Sverigetopplistan)	3

=== Year-end charts ===
Chart (2009)	Position
Sweden (Sverigetopplistan)	26

== Certifications ==
Region	Certification	Certified units/sales
Sweden (GLF)	Gold	6,000,000^{†}
^{†} Streaming-only figures based on certification alone.
