= Susie Päivärinta =

Swedish singer

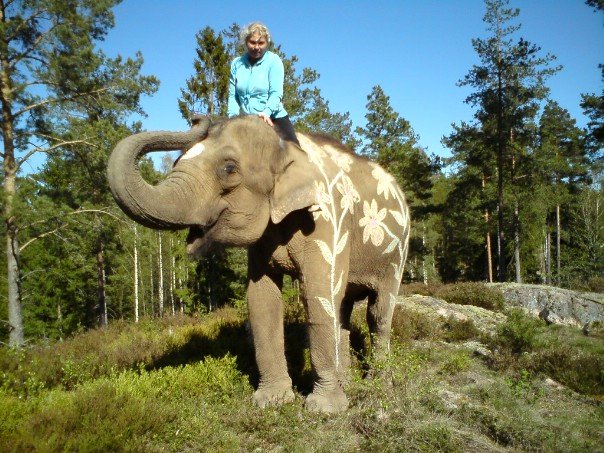
- Susie Päivärinta riding the elephant Saonoi at Kolmården Wildlife Park.

Background information
- Born: 10 May 1964 (age 61)
- Member of: Lili & Susie

Susanne Elisabeth "Susie" Päivärinta (also Sussie, born 10 May 1964) is a Swedish singer and artist of Finnish ancestry. She scored a number of hits in the 1980s and early 1990s with the duo Lili & Susie, with her sister Lili Päivärinta. Their most famous was their 1987 song "Oh Mama" which spent six weeks in the top five of the Swedish singles chart. They also competed at Melodifestivalen 1989 and in the Eurovision Song Contest with "Okey okey". In 1990, their song What's the Colour of Love also hit the top 5. The duo reunited in 2008 and competed at Melodifestivalen 2009 with the song Show Me Heaven, which peaked at number 6 in the Swedish singles chart. Päivärinta wrote C'est la vie! It's Alright!, performed by Lucia Perez, and Diamonds, performed by Melissa, which were both featured at Eurovision Song Contest 2011. Päivärinta helped write Baby Doll by the band Top Cats, which was selected for Melodifestivalen 2012 and reached 20 on the Swedish national radio chart.

== Career ==
=== Lili & Susie ===
She scored a number of hits with the duo Lili & Susie, a duo with her sister Lili Päivärinta, in the 1980s. Their 1987 song "Oh Mama" spent six weeks in the top five of the Swedish singles chart. They dissolved in 1993 and released a best-of compilation called The Collection 85-93 in 1994. The duo reunited in 2008 and competed in the Eurovision Song Contest with "Okey okey" in 1989 (5th place at Melodifestivalen 1989). The duo reunited in 2008 and competed again with Show Me Heaven in 2009 (4th place in Semifinal 2 of Melodifestivalen 2009, eliminated in "Andra chansen" round), which peaked at number 6 in the Swedish singles chart. Päivärinta and her sister reunited and went back on tour in 2013. In January 2014, they released a new video together as Lili & Susie.

=== Solo career ===
Päivärinta wrote two entries for the Spanish national selection for the Eurovision Song Contest 2011 Destino Eurovisión: C'est la vie! It's Alright!, performed by Lucia Pérez, and Diamonds, performed by Melissa. However, both were eliminated as they did not reach the top three in the jury vote. Päivärinta helped write Baby Doll by the bad Top Cats, which was selected for Melodifestivalen 2012 and reach 20 on the Swedish national radio chart. She helped write I Am Somebody by Pink Pistols, which competed in Melodifestivalen 2014 and placed 7th in the second semi-final.

=== Personal life ===
Päivärinta was born Susanne Päivärinta on May 10, 1964 in the Södermalm district of Stockholm, Sweden. She has been a strong proponent of animal rights since she was a child, and themes about animal rights are featured regularly in Päivärinta's music and videos. She has three children.

== See also ==
- List of Swedes in music
