= Mariann Grammofon =

Swedish record company

- Parent company: Warner Music Sweden
- Founded: 1972
- Founder: Bert Karlsson
- Genre: country, dansband music, pop, rock, schlager
- Country of origin: Sweden

Mariann Grammofon or Mariann Records, formed in 1972 was a record company run by Bert Karlsson in Skara, Sweden. Since May 2006 the label is owned by Warner Music Group which still, as of 2016, releases music using the label.

The label was sold following changes in music industry during the previous years.

== Signed artists and groups ==
- Afro-Dite
- Alf Robertson
- Anders Johansson
- Andrés Esteche
- Barbados
- Carola Häggkvist
- Casanovas
- Christina Lindberg
- Curt Haagers
- Date
- Drängarna
- Eddie Meduza
- Emil Sigfridsson
- Fame
- Flamingokvintetten
- Grönwalls
- Herreys
- Janne Lucas Persson
- Jigs
- Jimmy Jansson
- Johan Stengård
- Joyride
- Karl Martindahl
- Kellys
- Kikki Danielsson
- Lena Philipsson (until 1989)
- Linda Bengtzing
- Lotta Engberg
- Maja Gullstrand
- Martin Nilsson
- Martinez
- Mathias Holmgren
- Mats Bergmans
- Mats Rådberg & Rankarna
- Matz Bladhs
- Matz Stefanz med Lailaz
- Merit Hemmingsson
- Michael Michailoff
- Noice
- Peter Glyt
- Sandra Dahlberg
- Sara Löfgren
- Schytts
- Simson duPont
- Snowstorm
- Streaplers
- The Wallstones
- Towe Widerbergs
- Ultima Thule
- Wizex

== See also ==
- List of record labels
