= Alla (song) =

2008 song by Swedish singer Sofia

Single by Sofia
- Language: Greek
- Released: 28 February 2009
- Recorded: 2008
- Genre: Pop rock, modern laika
- Label: Lionheart/M&L
- Songwriters: Dimitri Stassos, Nina Karolidou, Irini Michas, Henrik Wikström

Sofia singles chronology
"Pote" (2008)	"Alla" (2009)

"Alla" (Greek: Άλλα; English: Other) is a song by Swedish singer Sofia and was her entrant in Sweden's Eurovision Song Contest selection process Melodifestivalen. The song is sung entirely in Greek and won the international jury's choice (wildcard) after failing to progress directly from its heat at the contest, gaining it a spot in the final, where it ended up placing tenth of eleven.

== Background and Melodifestivalen ==
After having taken part in the Swedish Melodifestivalen 2007 with "Hypnotized" and releasing the CD single "Pote" (Never) in Greece and Sweden, Sofia once again took part in the contest to select Sweden's Eurovision Song Contest entrant in 2009. For her second appearance, she chose to sing the song "Alla", sung in Greek. In an interview, Sofia said that she wanted to perform the song in Greek because she likes the language and because it was originally written in Greek and therefore should be performed that way. Writer Dimitri Stassos spoke about the song in an interview with Eurovision news website ESCToday saying:

This time, with Alla, we wanted to go all the way with Sofia, in Greek, and since the rules allow us, I΄m Greek, Sofia loves Greece and everything that comes along with it, it was never a difficult decision. Knowing that we had no chance to win, but at least we could be proud of our choice. It was also a great opportunity to promote Sofia and Alla to a big audience.

Sofia performed the song seventh on the night in the third semi-final of Melodifestivalen 2009, held on 21 February 2009. She received 14,782 televotes, placing her seventh of the eight entries. She was not one of the four songs selected for the final or second chance rounds, but it was revealed that she was chosen by the international jury to go against the other jury choices from the other semi-finals, with a chance of being the eleventh song in the contest's final.

On 7 March, Sofia once again appeared at Melodifestivalen, though she did not perform. Following the end of the "Second Chance Round", the jury chose her over semi-final two pick Amy Diamond to go to the final. In an interview after the round, Sofia said that she was glad that she will have the chance to sing the song even better than before and that she was probably chosen because she is an international artist with an international song. At the Melodifestivalen final, held on 14 March 2009, Sofia presented "Alla" ninth out of the eleven participants. When the results were announced, she received twelve points in total, eight from the international jury and four from the regional juries, placing her tenth.

== Release ==
"Alla" was first heard in the form of a one-minute clip on 20 February 2009, the day before Sofia appeared in the third semi-final of Melodifestivalen 2009. "Alla" was released to radios following the fourth semi-final on 28 February 2009, in line with the contest's rules. "Alla" then became available as a two track CD single and digital download on 1 March 2009 along with many of the other songs in the contest; it features the radio mix and a remix of the song by Oscar Holter. "Alla" was to be translated into both Swedish and English as well.

== Style and lyrical content ==
"Alla" is written by the same team that wrote her previous Melodifestivalen entry "Hypnotized" as well as the single "Pote". Writers Dimitri Stassos, Nina Karolidou, Irini Michas, and Henrik Wikström described it as "a rock inspired ethno pop number, or pop/rock [song] with a cool riff". Sofia sings about how other things will come along and how she lost herself and possessions, explaining that they "became smoke".

== Track listing ==
1. "Alla" (Radio Mix) – 3:00
2. "Alla" (Oscar Holter Remix) – 4:30

== Chart performance ==
The song debuted on the Swedish Singles Chart on the week of 13 March 2009 at number 26, and moved up to number 24 the following week, before falling to number 37, and recovering one spot to 36 in its fourth week.

Chart (2009)	Peak position
Swedish Singles Chart (Sverigetopplistan)	24
