= Cookies 'N' Beans =

Swedish country music group

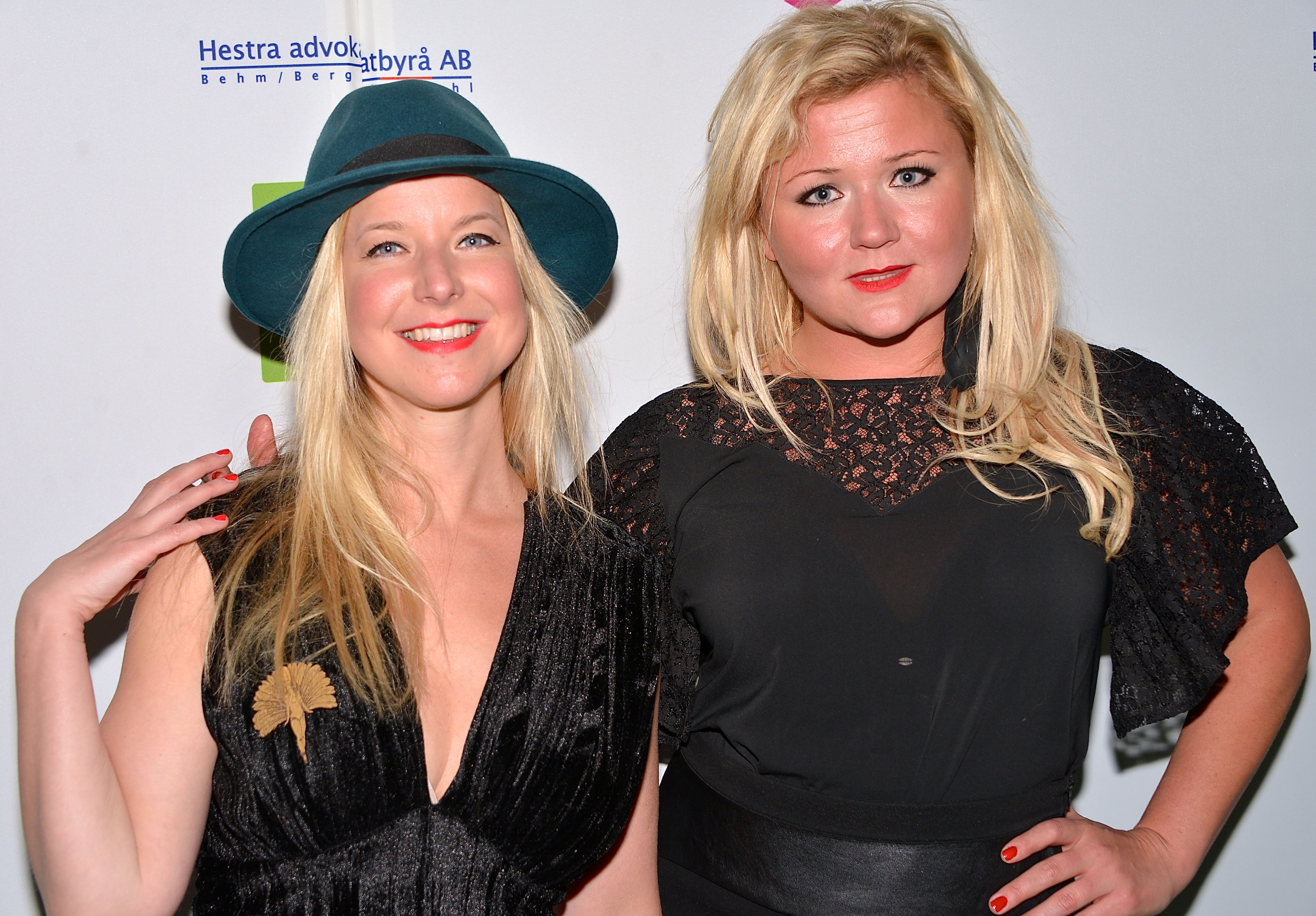
- Two members of Cookies 'N' Beans in 2013

Background information
- Origin: Sweden
- Genres: Country
- Years active: 2003–2013, 2026 -
- Members: Frida Öhrn; Linda Ström; Charlotte Centervall

Cookies 'N' Beans are a Swedish country music group consisting of Frida Öhrn, Linda Ström and Charlotte Centervall. The girls started the group in 2003 and in 2007 the group released their first cover album Tales from a Trailor Trash Soul. They participated in Melodifestivalen 2009, the Swedish national selection for the Eurovision Song Contest 2009 in Russia, with the song "What If", and again in Melodifestivalen 2013 for the Eurovision Song Contest 2013 in Malmö, with their song "Burning Flags". The group's fourth album, The First Steps, was released on 13 March 2013. The group has also appeared on several Swedish television shows such as Allsång på Skansen and Lotta på Liseberg singing their songs after appearing in Melodifestivalen the first time in 2009.

== Early career ==
They started the group in 2003 and in 2007 the group released their first cover album Tales from a Trailor Trash Soul which consisted of the group's favourite country music songs. In 2008 Cookies 'N' Beans won the Swedish country music championship in the genre "Alternative country". Later in 2008 they appeared on the tribute album of Leonard Cohen, Cohen – the Scandinavian Report with the song "First We Take Manhattan".

== Melodifestivalen ==
The group participated in Melodifestivalen 2009, the Swedish national selection for the Eurovision Song Contest 2009 held in Russia, with the song "What If", written by Amir Aly, Robin Abrahamsson and Maciel Numhauser. They sang in the second semifinal in Skellefteå on 14 February and placed fifth, not progressing to the Melodifestivalen final in Globen, Stockholm.

They also participated in Melodifestivalen 2013 for the Eurovision Song Contest 2013 held in Malmö, with their song "Burning Flags" written by Fredrik Kempe. They sang the song in the first semifinal in Karlskrona on 2 February and got enough votes to progress to the "Second chance" round of the competition. During the "Second chance" round they ended up in seventh place, yet again failing to make it to the Melodifestivalen final.

== Other work ==
On 9 March 2010, Cookies 'N' Beans all appeared in the singing television show Så ska det låta on SVT. And on 24 March the same year the group released their second music album, Beg, Borrow and Steal. In 2012 the group released their third album, Go Tell The World.

The group's fourth album, The First Steps, was released on 13 March 2013. Cookies 'N' Beans in 2010 appeared on Lotta på Liseberg, broadcast on TV4. In 2012 the band appeared on Allsång på Skansen on SVT.

== Discography ==
=== Albums ===
- 2007 – Tales from a Trailor Trash Soul
- 2010 – Beg, Borrow and Steal
- 2012 – Go Tell the World
- 2013 – The First Steps

=== Singles ===
- 2009 - "What If"
- 2010 - "First We Take Manhattan"
- 2013 - "Burning Flags"
- 2026 - "Hey I Oh"
