= Nina Söderquist =

Swedish musical singer (born 1972)

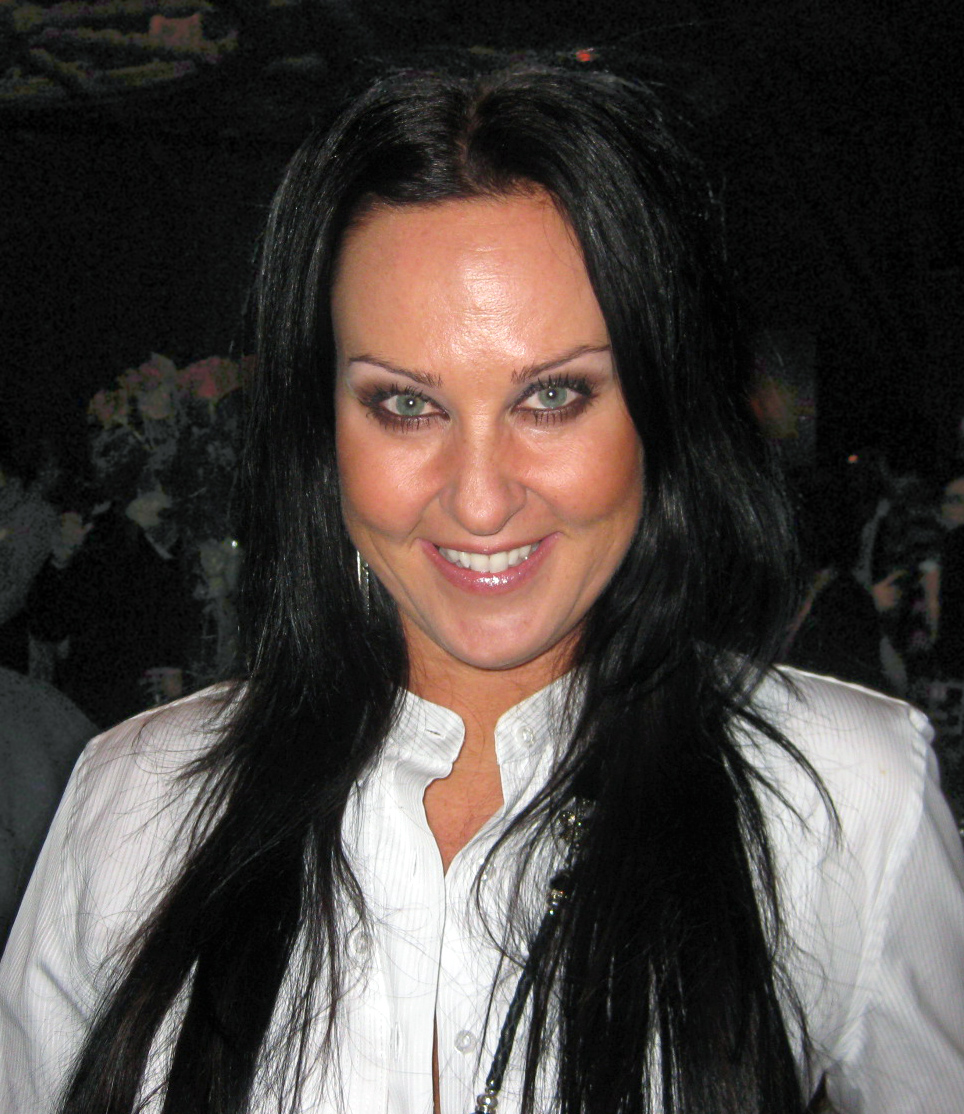
- Nina Söderquist in 2009

Background information
- Origin: Alfta, Sweden
- Genres: Musical, Pop, Rock
- Occupations: Singer, actress
- Website: Official myspace

Nina Söderquist (born 6 May 1972) is a Swedish musical singer and actress.

== Career ==
Nina started her career on Wallmans salonger and as a chorus singer girl behind many of Sweden's most popular singers. On 2 February 2008 Söderquist won the Swedish talent show West End Star on TV3. She won the prize of getting the leading role as "Lady of the Lake" in the London West End production of the musical Spamalot. In July of that year Söderquist was back in Sweden leaving the London stage for a while, she performed a song at the popular Swedish television show Allsång på Skansen. She was approached by the BBC to compete in the UK Eurovision selection event; she declined the offer.

In February 2009, Nina participated in Melodifestivalen 2009, the Swedish pre-selection show for Eurovision, in the hope of representing Sweden at the Eurovision Song Contest 2009 in Moscow, Russia. She performed first in her semi-final, finishing in fifth place, short of qualifying for the final and second chance round. She has since been working on material for an album due to be released some time during August, and has expressed a desire to return to Melodifestivalen.

Nina took the role Lady of the Lake in Spamalot once more, this time in Swedish, when the show opened in Malmö on 24 September 2010.

== America ==
In July 2008, it was revealed that Söderquist was among the front-runners for the role as "Saraghina" in the Rob Marshall film Nine, she however in the end lost the role to American singer Fergie. She left the role in Spamalot around that time to focus on Melodifestivalen and her wanting to get a role on Broadway also being offered appearances.
