= Show Me Heaven (Lili & Susie song) =

Single by Lili & Susie

from the album Nu och då - Det bästa med Lili & Susie
- Released: 2009
- Genre: pop, disco
- Label: M&L
- Songwriter(s): Pär Lönn, Thomas G:son, Calle Kindbom, Susie Päivärinta, Nestor Geli

Lili & Susie singles chronology
"Oh Mama (2000 Remix)" (2000)	"Show Me Heaven" (2009)	"Tease Me" (2009)

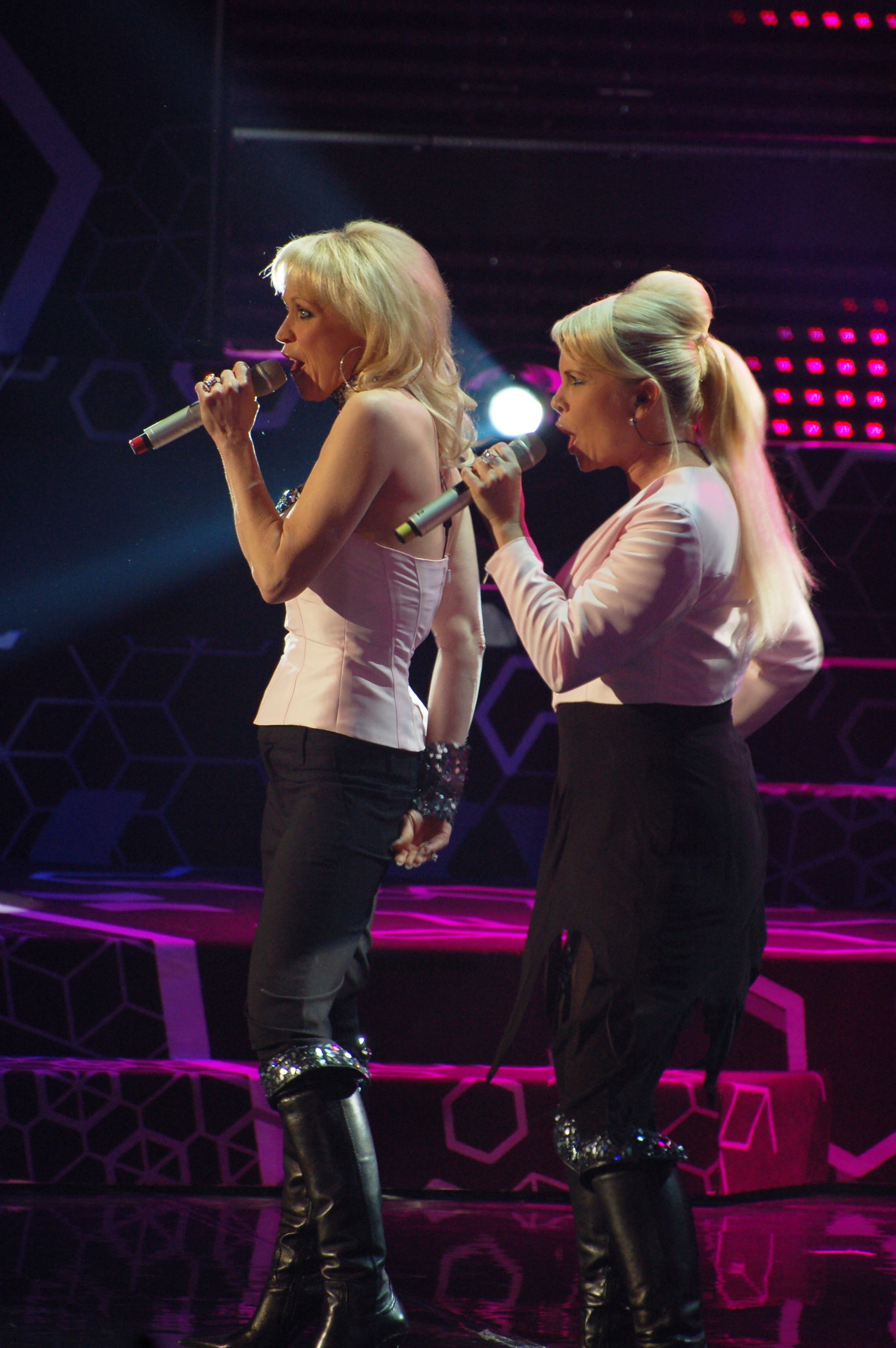
Lili & Susie with the song Show Me Heaven at Melodifestivalen 2009.

"Show Me Heaven" is a song written by Pär Lönn, Thomas G:son, Calle Kindbom, Susie Päivärinta and Nestor Geli, and performed by Lili & Susie at Melodifestivalen 2009. The song participated in the second semifinal held at the Skellefteå Kraft Arena on 14 February 2009, reaching the Andra chansen round, only to be eliminated in the end.

The single peaked at number 6 in the Swedish singles chart, entering on 19 April 2009.

During Melodifestivalen 2012, the song was selected for the "Tredje chansen" round.

== Charts ==
=== Weekly charts ===
Chart (2009)	Peak position
Sweden (Sverigetopplistan)	6

=== Year-end charts ===
Chart (2009)	Position
Sweden (Sverigetopplistan)	56
