= Disconnect Me =

Single by Marie Serneholt
- A-side: "Disconnect Me"
- B-side: "Disconnect Me" (instrumental version)
- Released: 2009
- Recorded: pop
- Songwriter(s): Peter Boström, Tony Nilsson

Disconnect Me is a song written by Peter Boström and Tony Nilsson, and performed by Marie Serneholt at Melodifestivalen 2009. The song participated in the competition inside Scandinavium in Gothenburg on 7 February 2009, but was knocked out ending up 6th.

The single peaked at 46th position at the Swedish singles chart and was also tested for Svensktoppen on 1 March 2009 but failed to enter the chart.

== Charts ==
Chart (2009)	Peak position
Sweden (Sverige)	46

== See also ==
- disconnect.me a privacy app for browser, desktop and mobile.
