= Take My Body Close =

2008 song

Single by Velvet
- A-side: "Take My Body Close"
- Released: August 2008
- Songwriter(s): Mathias Kallenberger, Anders Berlin

Velvet singles chronology
"Déjà vu" (2008)	"Take My Body Close" (2008)	"The Queen"

"Take My Body Close" is a song written by Mathias Kallenberger and Anders Berlin, and recorded by Velvet and released as a single in August 2008, and also appearing on her 2009 album The Queen. The single peaked at eight position at the Swedish singles chart.

== Charts ==
Chart (2008)	Peak position
Sweden (Sverigetopplistan)	8
