= Så vill stjärnorna =

Single by Molly Sandén

from the album Samma himmel
- A-side: "Så vill stjärnorna"
- Released: February 2009
- Genre: Pop
- Label: M&L Records
- Songwriters: Bobby Ljunggren, Marcos Ubeda, Ingela "Pling" Forsman

Molly Sandén singles chronology
"Keep on (Movin')" (2008)	"Så vill stjärnorna" (2009)	"Spread a Little Light" (2011)

"Så vill stjärnorna" is a song written by Bobby Ljunggren, Marcos Ubeda and Ingela "Pling" Forsman, and performed by Molly Sandén at Melodifestivalen 2009. The song participated in the third semifinal inside the Ejendals Arena in Leksand on 21 February 2009, from where it made it to the finals, where it ended up 11th.

The single peaked at 11th position at the Swedish singles chart. On 12 April 2009, the song entered Svensktoppen, where it ended up 9th the first week, only to have been knocked out of chart the upcoming week.

The song appeared on Molly Sandén's debut album Samma himmel.

== Charts ==
Chart (2009)	Peak position
Sweden (Sverigetopplistan)	11
