= Star Pilots =

Swedish pop band

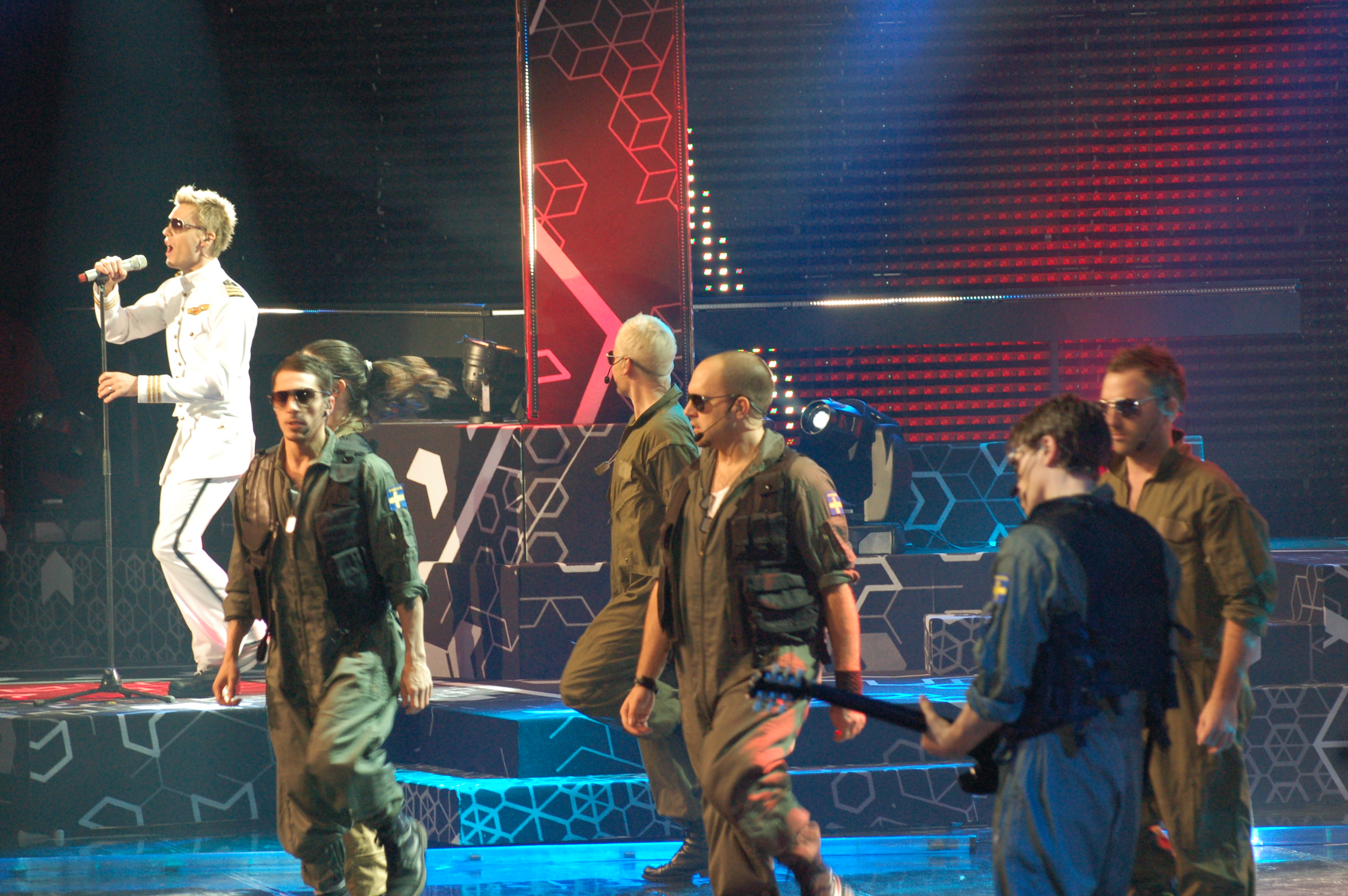
- Star Pilots performing at Melodifestivalen 2009

Background information
- Origin: Sweden
- Genres: Nu-disco, Dance-pop
- Labels: Hard2Beat
- Website: www.starpilots.se

Star Pilots is a Swedish pop group with Johan Becker, a contestant on Swedish television show Fame Factory and former member of the Swedish duo The Wallstones as lead singer.

The group's debut single, "In the Heat of the Night", was released in the United Kingdom on 18 May 2009, having already peaked at number 2 in the group's home country in Sweden, in 2008. The song's video features the band dressed as pilots with similarities to the 1980s film Top Gun (half-naked beach volleyball) and with five female dancers, including model Francesca Hoffman and Playboy model Louise Glover.

The group took part in the Swedish Melodifestivalen 2009 with "Higher" written by Johan Becker with songwriters and producers Johan Fjellström and Joakim Udd. The national competition is used for selecting the Swedish entry to the Eurovision Song Contest. Although reaching the "second chance" stage in the competition, they failed to make it to the Final 11. The song was still successful commercially reaching number 6 in Sweden.

== Members ==
Band members are:

- Mathias Singh
- Michael J:son Lindh
- Emilio Perrelli
- Petter Isaksson

Earlier members included

- Johan Becker
- Patrick Riber
- Daniel Gill
- Patrick Saxe
- Albin Sandqvist
- Daniel Wohlin

== Discography ==
=== Singles ===
Year	Title	Peak positions			Certification
Year	Title	SWE	NED Dutch Top 40	UK	Certification
2008	"In the Heat of the Night"	2	15* (Tipparade)	21	
2009	"Higher"	6	—	—	
2010	"I'm Alive"	22	—	—	
2011	"Heaven Can Wait"	—	—	—	
2016	"Only For Tonight"	—	—	—	

*Did not chart in main Dutch 40 chart, but in "bubbling under" Dutch Tipparade chart

Various band members had solo charting hits

== Individual member bios ==
=== Johan Becker ===
Johan Henrik Peter Becker was born in Helsinki on 27 March 1971 and brought up in Närpes, Finland. He took an interest in music and in his teens played the drums as part of a metal band in Finland. He moved to Sweden in 1997, aspiring to become a songwriter.

Now a Finnish-Swedish singer, in 2004, he took part in Fame Factory, winning the title. He found chart success with "Let Me Love You", one of his performances in Fame Factory, reaching number on the Sverigetopplistan, the official Swedish Singles Chart. Other performances during the show included "She's So High" and "Learning to Live", but these did not reach the charts. His song "As Long as We're Together" had a brief appearance in local Swedish charts. Let Me Love You was also covered by Filipino singer Jed Madela from his debut 2003 album I'll Be Around which was entitled "Let Me Love You (From The Bottom Of My Heart)"

Also in 2004, he also wrote the song "Här stannar jag kvar" for Sandra Dahlberg for Melodifestivalen 2004 and appeared with her during the show.

In 2004–2005, he was part of the pop duo The Wallstones with Karl Martindahl. They had initial success with the 2004 hit "Good Old Stonecake". The song reached #3 on the Swedish Singles Chart. In 2005, The Wallstones took part in Melodifestivalen 2005 with "Invisible People" The song also reached number 6 on the Swedish Singles Chart. The duo had one more release titled "C'mon Julie". All of these songs appeared on the duo's 2005 album Pleasure and Pain before they split up.

Johan Becker joined Star Pilots in 2005.

On September 9, 2006, he married Carola Szücs. They have two daughters, Bianca and Olivia.

He has cooperated with various artists like Girls' Generation, Exile, A-Teens and Peter Jöback. Exile's song "Rising Sun", written by Becker, was a hit in 2011 in Japan, reaching number 1 on the Oricon chart. The song was the official charity anthem after the tsunami disaster of 2011. He was one of the winners at the Japanese JASRAC Foreign Work Award alongside Sharon Vaughn and the Thott Brothers.

With Fredrik Thomander, he co-wrote the Girls' Generation single "Paparazzi", which reached number 1 on the Oricon charts in 2012.

Year	Title	Peak positions	Certification
Year	Title	SWE	Certification
2004	"Good Old Stonecake" (as part of The Wallstones)	3	
2005	"Invisible People" (as part of The Wallstones)	6	
2005	"Let Me Love You" (as Johan Becker)	3	

=== Petter Isaksson ===
As well as being a main vocalist with Star Pilots, in 2011 Petter Isaksson co-directed with Jonas Rosin and Roland Möhle a Swedish version of Jesus Christ Superstar. He also plays the role of Judas in the musical.

=== Albin Sandqvist ===
Albin Sandqvist, also known by the mononym Albin, besides Star Pilots was a solo electronic / dance pop act who in 2005 had a solo hit single, "I'll Be Waiting". The single included backing vocals by Marcus Öhrn and Sussie Ottebring with Lee Farmer on guitar, and a remix of the track by Punkstar.

Solo discography

- 2005: "I'll Be Waiting"

=== Mathias Singh ===
Mathias Singh, born 1977, is a professional dancer, choreographer and dance teacher at Danscenter in Stockholm. Besides Star Pilots, he was involved in a production of a Swedish version of the musical West Side Story. He was the host of the children's program Lattjo Lajban. With Sandra Dahlberg, he has hosted the program Prinsessan Sandra och Prinskörven and has long cooperated with other Star Pilot member Emilio Perrelli with artists like EMD, Linda Bengtzing, Darin, Carola Häggqvist, Rebound, Jasmine Kara, Ola Svensson, Danny, September, Elin Lanto, Lovestone and Sibel. He also runs the dance magazine 5678.

=== Emilio Perrelli ===
Emilio Perrelli born April 18, 1975, in Spångavägen, besides his membership in Star Pilots is a choreographer and together with Mathias Singh has worked with EMD, Danny Saucedo, September, Rebound, Carola Häggqvist and Darin. With Matias Singh, he also runs the dance magazine 5678. Emilio Perrelli's cousin Sebastian Ingrosso is a member of the Swedish House Mafia.
