= Snälla, snälla =

Single by Caroline af Ugglas

from the album Så gör jag det igen
- Released: 2009
- Genre: soul
- Label: M&L
- Songwriters: Heinz Liljedahl, Caroline af Ugglas

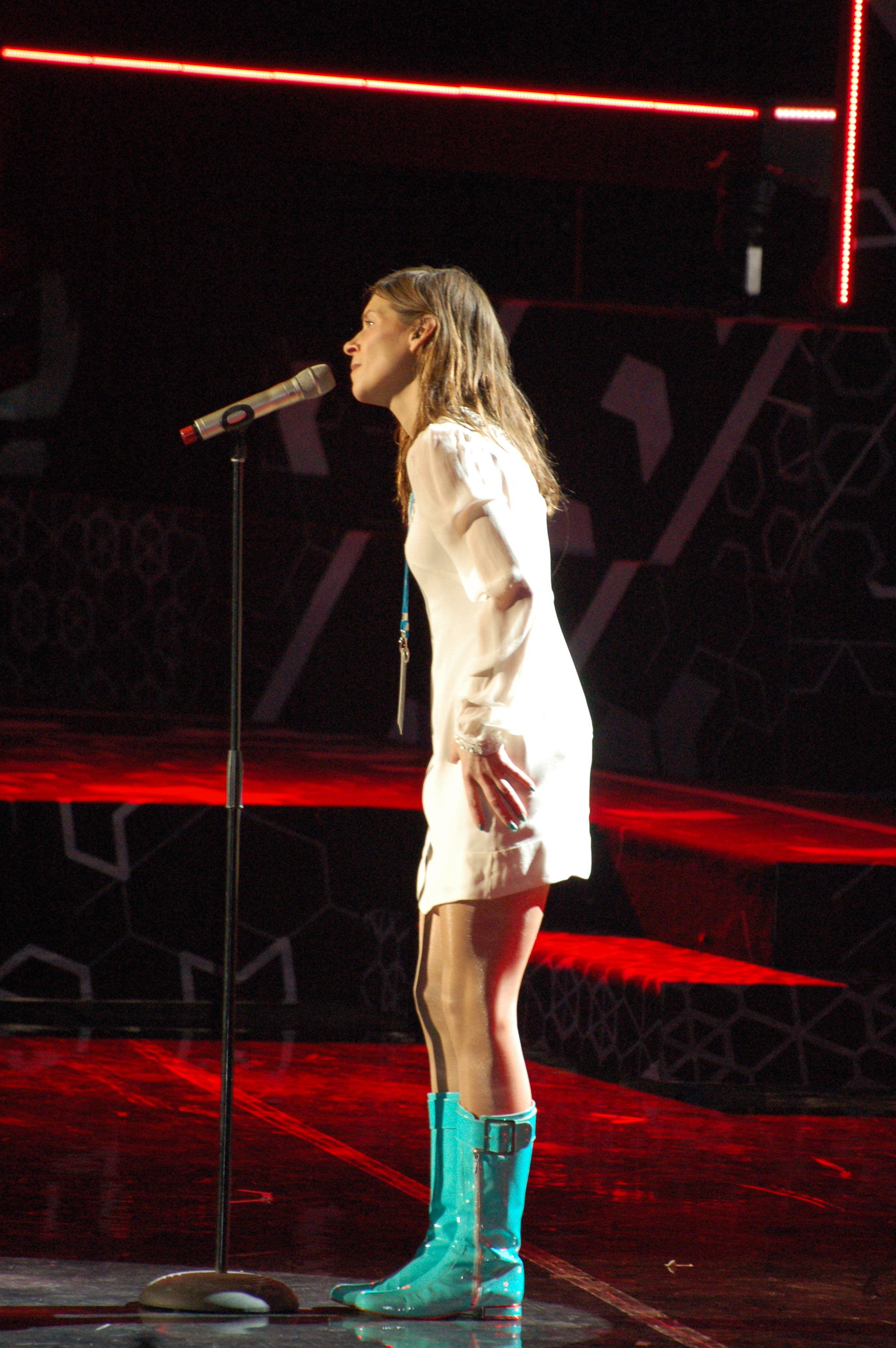
Caroline af Ugglas performing the song at Melodifestivalen 2009.

"Snälla, snälla" is a soul ballad written by Caroline af Ugglas and Heinz Liljedahl, and performed by Caroline af Ugglas at Melodifestivalen 2009, participating at the first semifinal inside Scandinavium in Gothenburg on 7 February 2009. Via Andra chansen, the song reached the finals, where it earned second place.

The song was also at the 2009 Caroline av Ugglas album Så gör jag det igen.

The single peaked at number 2 on the Swedish singles chart. The song also entered Trackslistan. On 10 May 2009, the song entered Svensktoppen.

At Dansbandskampen 2010, the song was performed by Willez.

== Charts ==
Chart (2009)	Peak position
Sweden (Sverigetopplistan)	2
