= Killing Me Tenderly =

Single by Anna Sahlene & Maria Haukaas Storeng
- A-side: "Killing Me Tenderly"
- Released: 2009
- Genre: pop
- Label: M&L Records
- Songwriter(s): Amir Aly; Henrik Wikström; Tobbe Petersson

"Killing Me Tenderly" is a song written by Amir Aly, Henrik Wikström, and Tobbe Petersson, and performed by Anna Sahlene & Maria Haukaas Storeng at Melodifestivalen 2009, finishing 7th in the 4th competition inside the Malmö Arena on 28 February 2009.

The song was also tested for Svensktoppen on 22 March 2009, but failed to enter chart. During Melodifestivalen 2012 the song was selected as one of the "Tredje chansen" entries.

== Charts ==
Chart (2009)	Peak position
Sverige	22
