= Sofia (Swedish singer) =

Sofia Σοφια
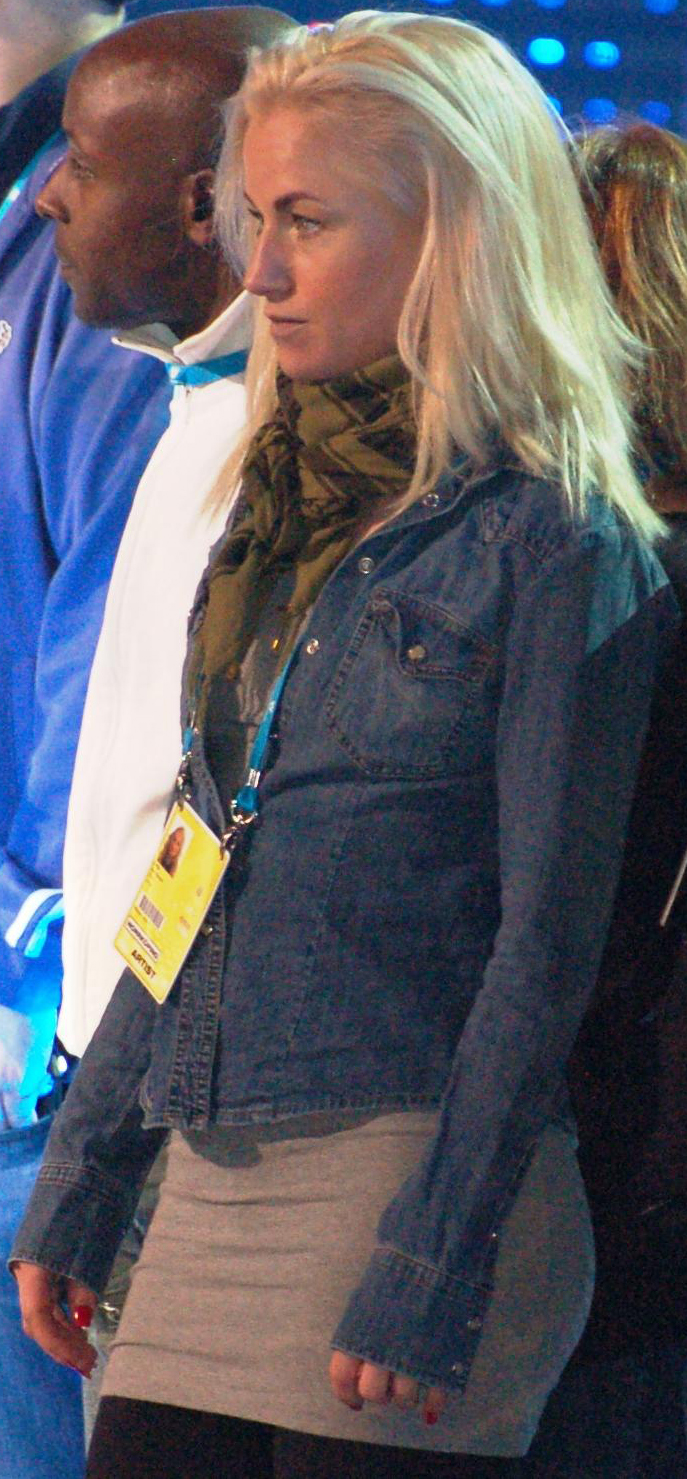
- Sofia in 2009

Background information
- Also known as: Sofia (Stage name)
- Born: Sofia Rebecca Hildegard Berntson; August 4, 1979 (age 47)
- Genres: Pop, modern laika
- Occupations: Singer, songwriter
- Instrument: Vocals
- Years active: 2007–present
- Labels: Lionheart/M&L; Universal Greece
- Website: sofiaberntson.se

Sofia Rebecca Hildegard Berntson (born August 4, 1979) is a Swedish singer who often sings in Greek. She has released three CD singles since 2007 and has taken part in the Swedish song selection process for the Eurovision Song Contest, Melodifestivalen, twice, in 2007 and more recently in 2009.

== Early life ==
Sofia was born in Stockholm in 1979. Until she was about sixteen, she visited Greece every summer on vacation and toured the country while being based mainly in Athens. She stated that she fell in love with the country and its music and culture after becoming friends with Greek musician Alexandros Papakonstantinou.

== Musical career ==
=== 2007–2008: "Hypnotized" and "Pote" ===
In 2007 Sofia participated in Melodifestivalen, the Swedish song selection process for the Eurovision Song Contest. She appeared in the first semi-final on February 3, 2007, and performed the song "Hypnotized" seventh in the running order. The song was described as having a Greek flavor and overall her performance was seen as professional, with her singing with a "very strong voice". The song did not manage to make it to the next round, placing seventh. Sofia stated in an interview after the event that she was very satisfied with her performance and that she never thought that she would be able to go through to the final. She added that she was "happy that [she] got a chance to show the Swedish audience who [she was] and what [she] can deliver on stage".

Following her appearance in Melodifestivalen, she released "Hypnotized" digitally as a four track CD single on February 5, 2007, with a physical copy being released on February 10. In addition to the original version, it contained a remix by Oscar Holter, a karaoke version, and a version sung in Greek titled "Ipopta Vlemata" (Suspicious). The song charted in Sweden for two weeks, peaking at number 50, and in Finland where it charted for a week, peaking at number six.

After Melodifestivalen, Sofia traveled to Greece where she stayed for eleven months. At the beginning of November 2007, Sofia attended and performed at the Thessaloniki Song Festival with the song "Anikse Tin Porta" (Open the door) once again composed by Dimitris Stassos and sung in Greek. In Fall 2008, Sofia made her Greek market debut, releasing a two track CD single titled "Pote" (Never). "Pote" is a pop ballad written by Greek-Swedes Nektarios Tyrakis, Dimitris Stassos and Irini Michas; Stassos had previously written "Hypnotized". In addition to the title track, the song "Toso Apla" (That simple) was also included, which is a duet between Sofia and Greek rap group Goin' Through.

=== 2009–present: "Alla" ===
In early 2009, Sofia released "Pote" in Sweden as a two track CD single, switching the duet with a remix of "Pote". In February, she once again took part in Melodifestivalen, this time with the song "Alla" (Other), sung in Greek. In an interview, Sofia said that she wanted to perform the song in Greek because she likes the language and because it was originally written in Greek and therefore should be performed that way. It was written by Dimitris Stassos, Nina Karolidou, Irini Michas, and Henrik Wikström who described it as "a rock inspired ethno pop number, or pop/rock [song] with a cool riff". Sofia performed the song seventh on the night in the third semi-final of Melodifestivalen 2009, held on February 21, 2009. She was not one of the four songs selected for the final or second chance rounds, placing seventh of eight, but was chosen by the international jury to go against the other jury choices from the other semi-finals, with a chance of being the eleventh song in the contest's final. A little more than a week later, "Alla" was released as a two track CD single on March 1, 2009, along with many of the other songs in the contest; it features the radio mix and a remix of the song by Oscar Holter.

On March 7, Sofia once again appeared at Melodifestivalen, though she did not perform. Following the end of the "Second Chance Round", the jury chose her over Amy Diamond to go to the final, held on March 14, 2009. In an interview after the round, Sofia said that she was glad that she would have the chance to sing the song even better than before and that she was probably chosen because she is an international artist with an international song. At the Melodifestivalen final, Sofia presented "Alla" ninth out of the eleven participants. When the results were announced, she received twelve points in total, eight from the international jury and four from the regional juries, placing her tenth. Soon after the final, the song entered the Swedish Singles Chart and peaked at number 24.

In early 2011, Sofia resurfaced in music after a press release by Oxygen Music/4 Music stated that she and writer/rapper Apollon were submitted to Greek broadcaster Hellenic Broadcasting Corporation to be considered as participants together in a national final to represent Greece in the Eurovision Song Contest 2011. The record label alleged that the broadcaster would not entertain the idea of either the label or Sofia and Apollon participating in the final. The claim was similar to several other acts who wished to participate, but were blocked from consideration by the broadcaster.

== Discography ==
=== CD singles ===
- 2007: "Hypnotized"
1. "Hypnotized" (Radio Version) – 3:17
2. "Ipopta Vlemata" – 3:16
3. "Hypnotized" (Oscar Holter Remix) – 2:42
4. "Hypnotized" (Karaoke Mix) – 3:13

- 2008: "Pote" (Never) [Greek Release]
1. "Pote" – 4:04
2. "Toso Apla" (duet with Goin' Through) – 3:08
- 2009: "Pote" (Never) [Swedish Release]
1. "Pote" – 4:04
2. "Pote" (Remix) – 4:09

- 2009: "Alla" (Other)
1. "Alla" (Radio Mix) – 3:00
2. "Alla" (Oscar Holter Remix) – 4:30
