= You're My World (Emilia Rydberg song) =

Single by Emilia Rydberg

from the album My World
- A-side: "You're My World"
- Released: 2009
- Genre: Soul pop
- Length: 3 minutes
- Label: M&L Records
- Songwriters: Figge Boström, Emilia Rydberg

Emilia Rydberg singles chronology
"I Can Do It" (2008)	"You're My World" (2009)

"You're My World" is a song written by Emilia Rydberg and Figge Boström, and performed by Emilia Rydberg at Melodifestivalen 2009. The song participated at the semifinal in Scandinavium in the town of Gothenburg on 7 February 2009, reaching the finals where the song ended up 9th.

Emilia Rydberg described the song as a "tribute to those we love, and the warmth they give us".

The song was awarded a Marcel Bezençon Awards in 2009 for best Melodifestivalen composition of 2009.

The single peaked at third position at the Swedish singles chart. On 3 May 2009 the song also entered Svensktoppen, where it stayed for seven weeks until 14 June 2009 peaking at eight position before leaving chart.

== Charts ==
=== Weekly charts ===
Chart (2009)	Peak position
Sweden (Sverigetopplistan)	11

=== Year-end charts ===
Chart (2009)	Position
Sweden (Sverigetopplistan)	91
