= Jag tror på oss =

Single by Scotts

from the album Längtan
- A-side: "Jag tror på oss"
- Released: March 2009
- Genre: modern dansband music
- Label: M&L Records
- Songwriters: Lars "Dille" Diedricson, Martin Hedström, Ingela "Pling" Forsman

Scotts singles chronology
"Om igen" (2008)	"Jag tror på oss" (2009)

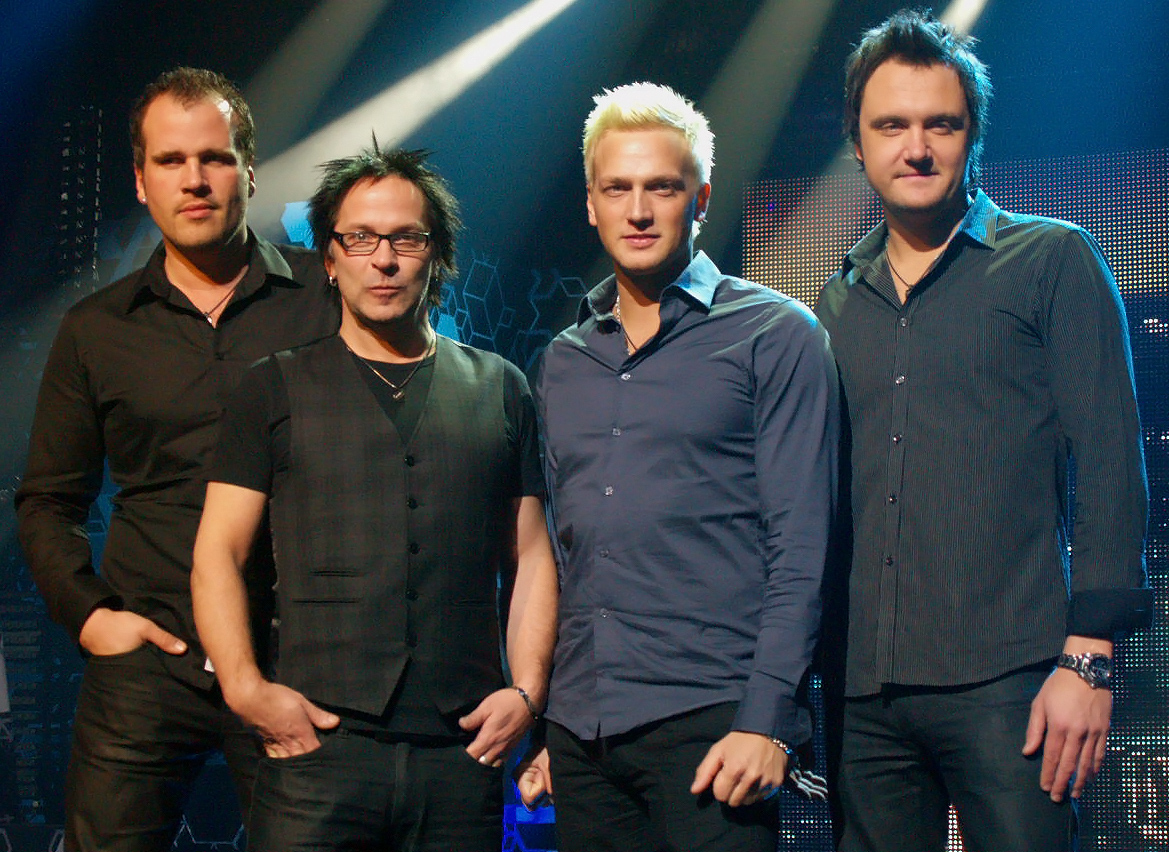
Scotts before Melodifestivalen 2009.

"Jag tror på oss" is a song written by Lars "Dille" Diedricson, Martin Hedström and Ingela "Pling" Forsman, and performed by the Swedish band Scotts at Melodifestivalen 2009. Through the semifinal in Gothenburg on 7 February 2009, the song went to Andra chansen where it failed to reach the finals.

The song peaked at 3rd place on the Swedish singles chart. The song was also tested for Svensktoppen on 12 April 2009 but failed to go through.

Later in 2009, the song was also added as a bonus track on the Scotts album Längtan.

After Dark was originally asked to participate with the song, but declined following scheduling problems.

== Charts ==
Chart (2009)	Peak position
Sweden (Sverigetopplistan)	32
