= Karl Martindahl =

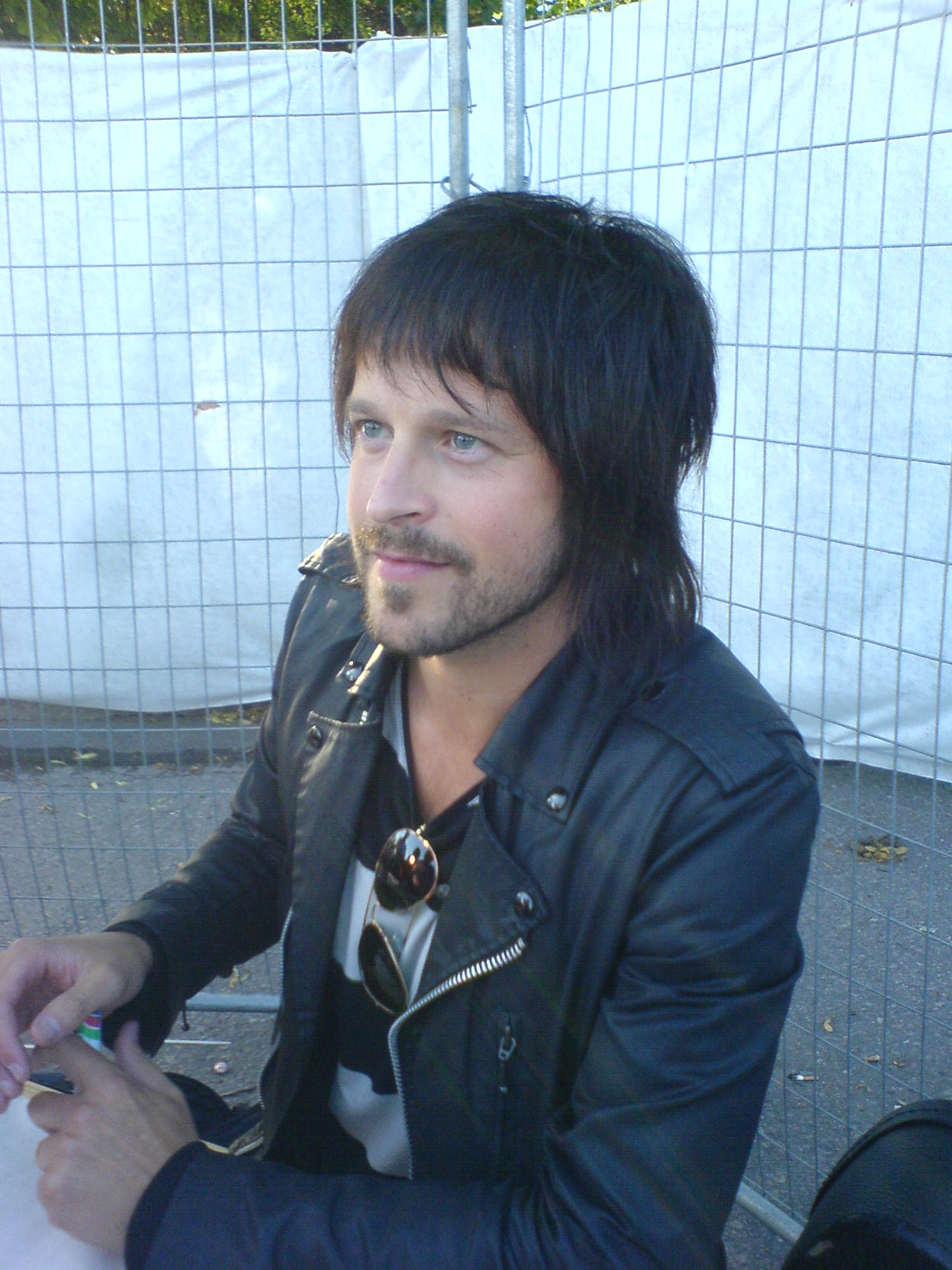
- Karl Martindahl in Vätternfestivalen in Motala in 2007

Background information
- Born: Karl Glenn Martindahl; June 5, 1980 (age 45)
- Origin: Bankeryd, Sweden
- Genres: Pop
- Occupation: Singer
- Instrument: Vocals
- Years active: 1990–present
- Website: [www.karlmartindahl.se/ Official Site]

Karl Glenn Martindahl (born in Bankeryd, Sweden on 5 June 1980) is a Swedish singer and son of Swedish footballer Glenn Martindahl.

== Beginnings ==
Karl Martindahl had his debut in the TV program Söndagsöppet in the early 1990s as a child singer with "The Flying Eagles" and the song "Filippa". He also took part in the Swedish reality show Fame Factory for the 2003–2004 season.

In 2004, he took part in Melodifestivalen 2004 with "Love Turns Water into Wine" written by Michael Persson and Peter Broman a bid to represent Sweden in the Eurovision Song Contest 2004, but failed to be chosen. He continued his solo musical career.

== The Wallstones ==
In 2004, agreed with Johan Becker, the Fame Factory winner in 2004 to form the pop duo The Wallstones where they had a 2005 album Pleasure and Pain and three singles "Good Old Stonecake" in 2004, and "C'mon Julie" in 2005. The Wallstones duo made another bid to Melodifestivalen 2005 with "Invisible People" written by Martindahl and Becker, but didn't make it to the final of the contest.

== Charlie Emm ==
Karl Martindahl is now a lead singer with the band Charlie Emm, that also includes Ryan Roxie (the former guitarist with Alice Cooper).

== In popular culture ==
In 2010, he joined Daniel Karlsson and Robin Bengtsson to sing "Wake Up world", the charity song for "Hjälp Haiti".

== Discography ==
=== Singles ===
Solo

- 2003: "When you're coming back again" (reached #4)
- 2004: "Love Turns Water into Wine" (at Melodifestivalen 2004) (reached #14)
- 2004: "Turn and Walk Away" (reached #21)
- 2007: "B.B.B Baby"

Collective

- 2010: "Wake Up World" (as part of "Hjälp Haiti")
