= Lili & Susie =

Swedish musical duo

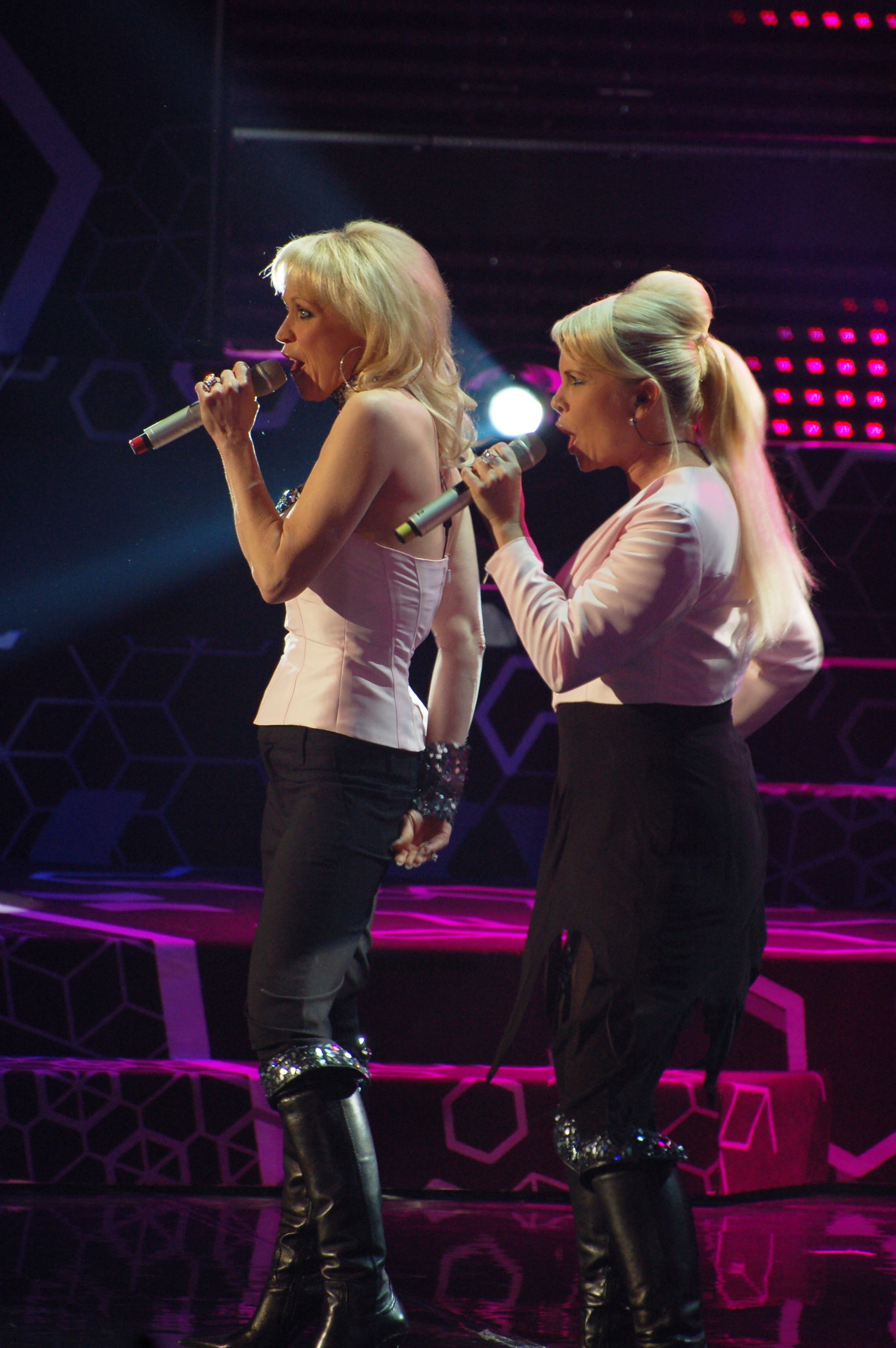
- Lili & Susie performing at Melodifestivalen 2009

Background information
- Origin: Sweden
- Years active: 1985-1993, temporary reunions in 1996, 2000 and 2009
- Past members: Lili Päivärinta, Susie Päivärinta

Lili & Susie (initially Lili & Sussie) is a Swedish pop duo composed of the sisters Lili Päivärinta and Susie Päivärinta. They scored a number of hit singles in the late 1980s and early 1990s. Their single Candy Love, written in the tradition of Italo Disco, was a dancefloor hit in the discothèques around the mediterranean in 1986, with modest success in northern Europe. Their biggest hit was "Oh Mama" in 1987. "Oh Mama" spent six weeks in the top five of the Swedish singles chart. They dissolved in 1993 and released a best-of compilation called The Collection 85-93 in 1994. The duo competed in the Swedish pre-selection to the Eurovision Song Contest 1989 with the song "Okey, okey", finishing 5th, at the final of Melodifestivalen 1989.

The duo reunited in 2008 and competed in Melodifestivalen 2009 with the song "Show Me Heaven". It placed fourth in Semi-final 2 leading to an appearance in the "Andra chansen" (second chance) round, where it was subsequently eliminated. The song later peaked at number 6 on the Swedish singles chart. The Päivärinta sisters reunited again in 2013, performing a mini-tour. In January 2014, they released a new video together as Lili & Susie.

== Discography ==
=== Albums ===
- Lili & Sussie (1985)
- Dance Romance (1987)
- Anytime (1988)
- Let Us Dance! A Remix Retrospective (1989)
- The Sisters (1990) - gold
- No Sugar Added (1992)

=== Compilations ===
- Non Stop Dancing (1990)
- Chance to Dance (1991)
- The Collection (1993)
- I vågens tecken (1995)
- Flashback #6 (1995)

=== Singles ===
- Sommar i natt (1985)
- Stjärnljus (1985)
- Om du kan (1985)
- Stay (1986)
- Candy Love (1986)
- Samma tid samma plats (1986)
- Tokyo (1987)
- Oh Mama (1987)
- Bara du och jag (1987)
- Enkel Resa (1988)
- We Were Only Dancing (1988)
- Jag drömmer om en jul hemma (White Christmas) (1988)
- Robert & Marie (1989)
- Okey Okey! (1989)
- Let Us Dance Just a Little Bit More (1989)
- Svullo (1990/Svullo + Lili & Susie)
- What's the Colour of Love (1990) - platinum
- Boyfriend (1990) - gold
- Nothing Could Be Better (1990)
- Something in Your Eyes (1991)
- Evelyn (1991)
- Can't Let You Go (1991)
- Where Eagles Fly (1992)
- Ride On My Love (1992)
- All You Can Say Is Goodbye (1993)
- Halfway to Heaven (1993)
- I Believe in Good Things '93/Megamix (1993)
- Love Never Dies (1996)
- Hypnotized (1996)
- Oh Mama (2000 Remix) (2000)
- Show Me Heaven (2009)
- Tease Me (2009)
- Bailamor (2011)
- Från oss till er (2011)
- Fly, Fly Little Bird (2014)
- Would You Be Mike (2014
- En liten kyss av dig (2020)
- Hela livet var ett disco (2020)
- Drömmar (2021)

== See also ==
- List of Swedes in music
