= Caroline af Ugglas =

Swedish singer, artist and chorister (born 1972)

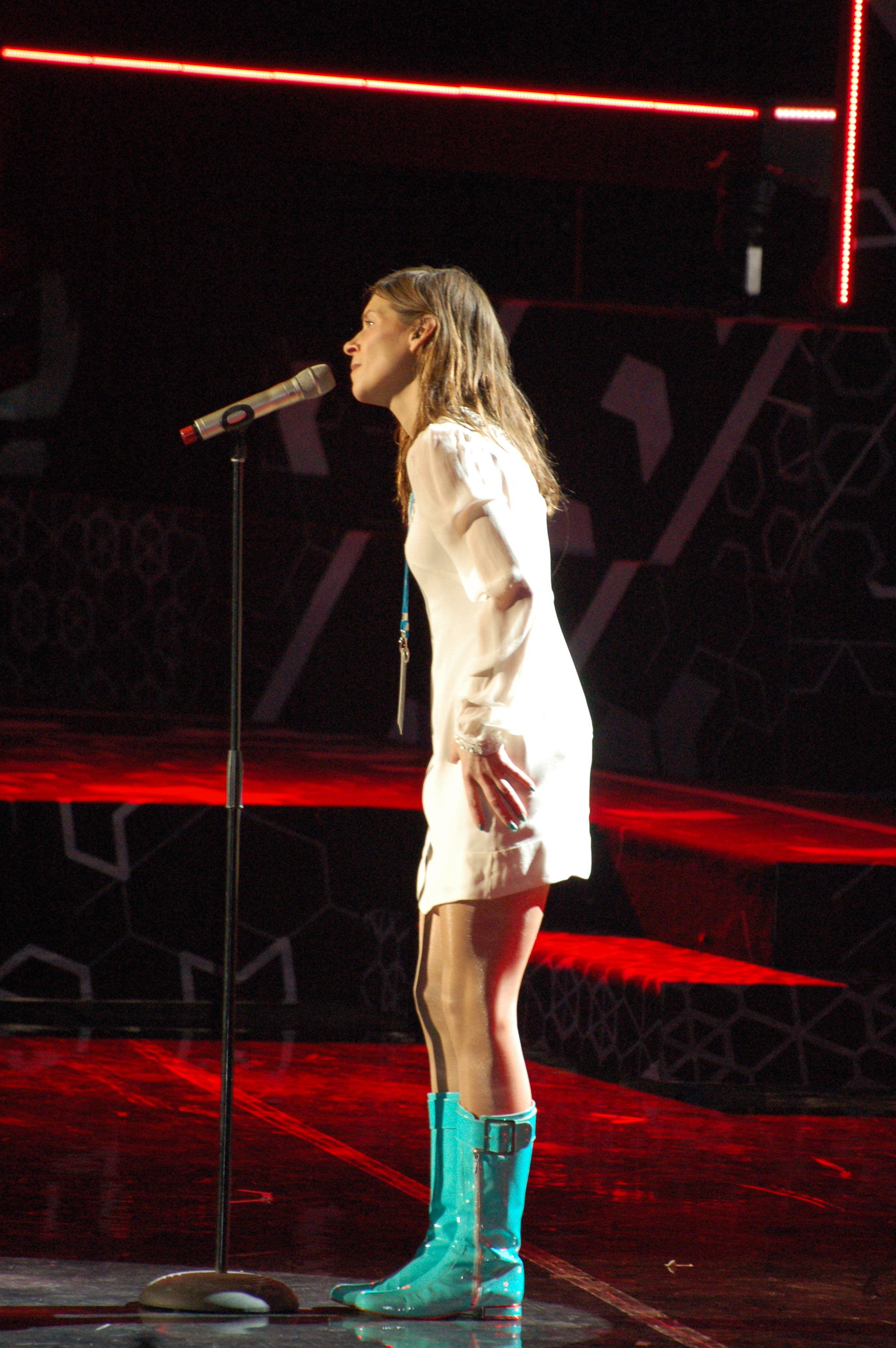
- Caroline Af Ugglas performing in Melodifestivalen 2009

Background information
- Born: 7 April 1972 (age 54)
- Origin: Bromma, Sweden
- Genres: Soul, Pop
- Occupation: Singer
- Instrument: Vocals

Caroline Thérese af Ugglas Liljedahl (born 7 April 1972) is a Swedish singer, artist and chorister.

Af Ugglas created the format for a televised choir contest, which was picked up by NBC in the United States as the show Clash of the Choirs, and by the Seven Network in Australia as Battle of the Choirs.

== Melodifestivalen ==
Caroline af Ugglas has taken part so far in three Melodifestivalen events:

- Melodifestivalen 2007 with the song "Tror på dig", written by herself along with Heinz Liljedahl and Mattias Torell. On 24 February 2007 she performed "Tro på dig", ending up in 6th place, which did not qualify her any further in the contest.
- Melodifestivalen 2009 with the track "Snälla Snälla" (Please, Please). It proceeded to the final where it came second, only 11 points from winning.
- Melodifestivalen 2013 with the song "Hon har inte".

== Discography ==
=== Albums ===
Year	Title	Peak positions	Certification
Year	Title	SWE	Certification
1997	Ida Blue	—	
1999	Mrs Boring	—	
2005	Twiggs (with Twiggs)	—	
2007	Joplin på svenska	3	GLF: Gold
2009	Så gör jag det igen	1	GLF: Platinum
2010	Vad var det jag sa	5	
2013	Jag har katten	5	
2016	Nåväl	14	
2020	Antingen (Eller)	—	

=== Singles ===
Title	Year	Peak positions	Certification	Album
Title	Year	SWE	Certification	Album
"Senior & Junior"	1997	—		Ida Blue
"Heaven & Earth"	1997	—		Ida Blue
"Nothing Left to Say"	1999	—		Mrs Boring
"Egoistic"	1999	—		Mrs Boring
"I Wanna Be Naked"	1999	—		Mrs Boring
"Waltzing"	2005	—		Twiggs
"En del av mitt hjärta" (cover of Piece of My Heart)	2006	—		Joplin på svenska
"Tror på dig"	2007	12		Non-album single
"Snälla snälla"	2009	2	GLF: Gold	Så gör jag det igen
"Vi blundar"	2009	—		Så gör jag det igen
"Hon har inte"	2013	59		Jag har katten

=== Other appearances ===
- 1999 – Barn 2000 (sings the song "Gud")
- 2007 – Scarsoul (sings the song "Hold On")

== International Chart Success ==
- The Pmachinery Top 30: No. 3
