= Scotts (band) =

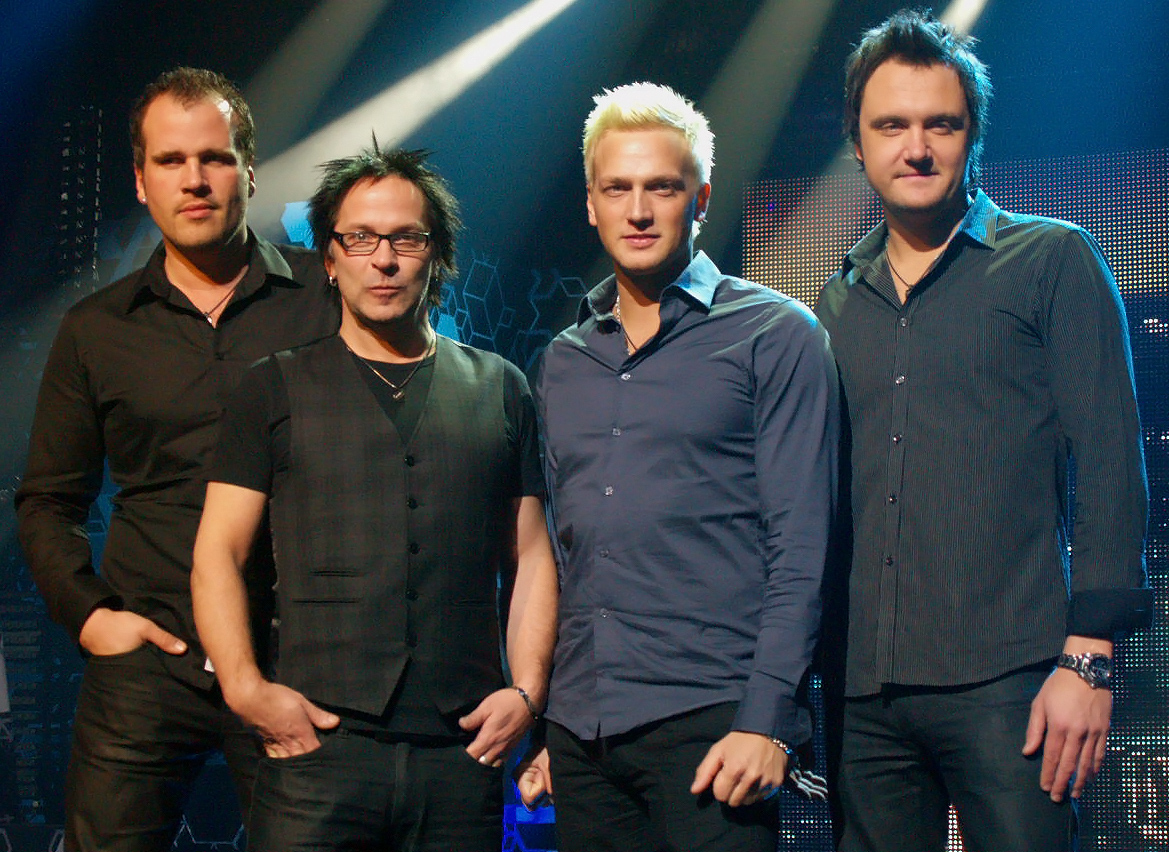

Background information
- Origin: Lidköping, Sweden
- Genres: Modern dansband music
- Years active: 1992-present

Scotts is a modern dansband from Lidköping, Sweden. Established in 1992, Scotts competed at Dansbandskampen 2008, finishing up second behind Larz-Kristerz, starting to aim at their ambition becoming a full-time band. The band also competed at Melodifestivalen 2009, with the song "Jag tror på oss".

== Members ==
- Henrik Strömberg - Vocal, guitar
- Roberto Mårdstam - bass
- Claes Linder - keyboard
- Per-Erik "Lillen" Tagesson - drums

== Discography ==
=== Albums ===
Year	Album	Peak positions
Year	Album	SWE
1992	Om det känns rätt	
2008	På vårt sätt	1
2009	Längtan	1
2010	Vi gör det igen	4
2014	Tre år senare	15

Others

- 2009: Upp till dans

=== Singles ===
Year	Single	Peak positions	Album
Year	Single	SWE	Album
2001	"En blick, en dans, en kyss" ("One Dance, One Rose, One Kiss")		
2004	"Du"		
2006	"Big Boys'n Pink Ladies"		
2008	"Om igen"	27	
2009	"Jag tror på oss"	32	Längtan

=== DVD ===
- 2010: På väg till Malung med Scotts

== Svensktoppen songs ==
- 1999: "Cassandra"
- 2001: "Marias kärlek"
- 2001: "En blick, en dans, en kyss" (One Dance, One Rose, One Kiss)
- 2009: "Om igen"
- 2009: "Underbar"
- 2010: "Jag ångrar ingenting"

=== Missade svensktoppslistan ===
- 2002: "Leker med elden"
- 2009: "Jag tror på oss"
