= Skellefteå Kraft Arena =

Indoor ice hockey rink in Skellefteå, Sweden

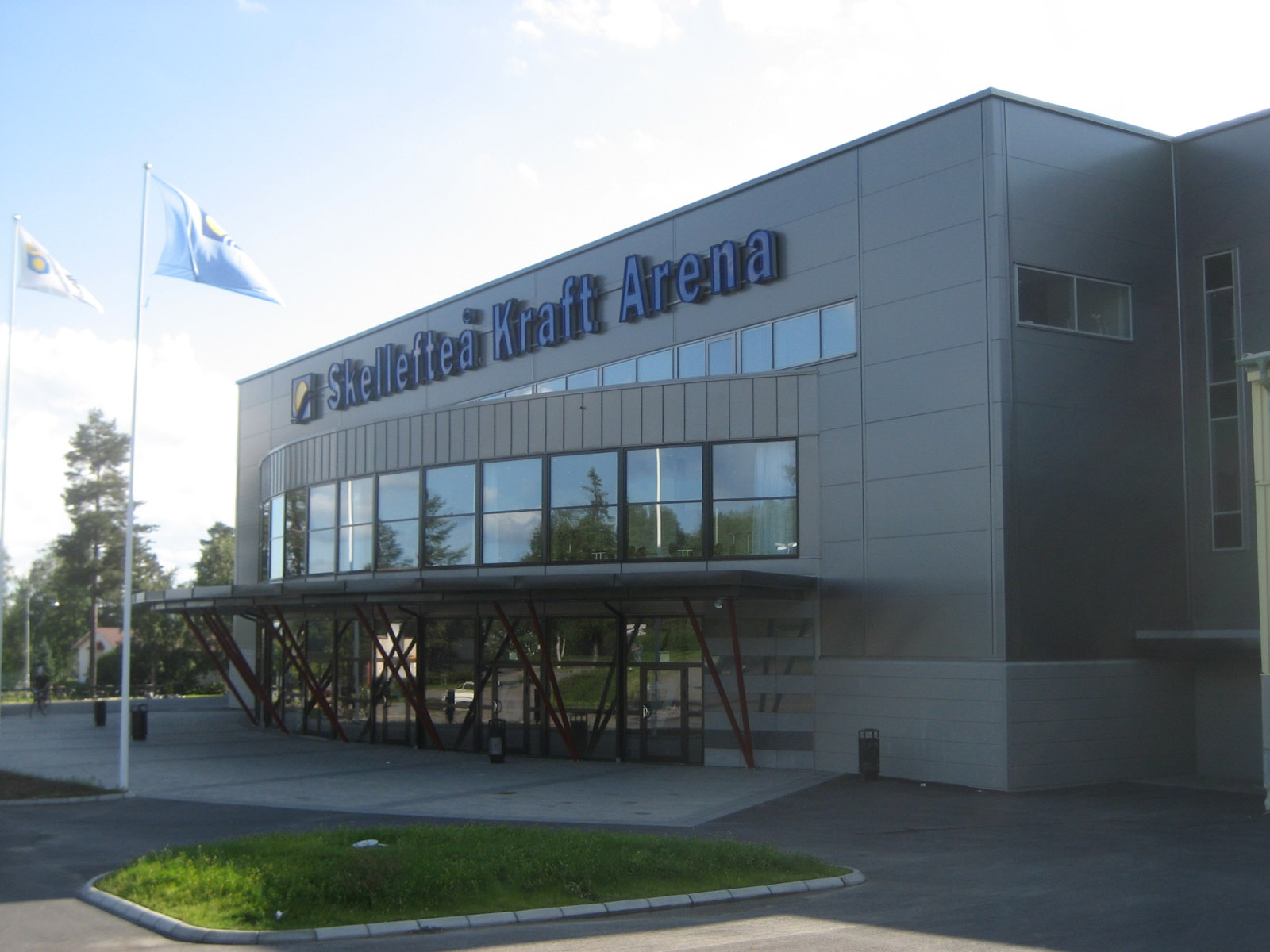
- Skellefteå Kraft Arena in July 2008
- Interactive map of Skellefteå Kraft Arena
- Location: Mossgatan 27, Skellefteå, Sweden
- Coordinates: 64°45′41″N 20°58′02″E
- Owner: Skellefteå Kommun
- Capacity: Ice hockey: 5,801

Construction
- Built: 1966
- Opened: 6 January 1967
- Renovated: 2005–2008

Tenants
- Skellefteå AIK (SHL) (1967–present); SK Lejon

Skellefteå Kraft Arena is an indoor sporting arena located in Skellefteå, Sweden. The capacity of the arena is 5,801 and it was built in 1966. and inaugurated on 6 January 1967. It is the home arena of the SHL's Skellefteå AIK as well as Hockeyettan's SK Lejon. The arena is named after Skellefteå Kraft, a Swedish power company.

== Renovation ==
Skellefteå Kraft Arena turned into a construction site in late summer 2005, since the decision had been made to renovate the arena. By the start of the 2007/2008 season the renovation was almost finished, and the seating capacity had been increased from 5,200 to 6,001. The renovation cost an estimated 140 MSEK, and transformed the arena from a typical Swedish indoor ice hockey venue to a modern ice hockey and event arena.

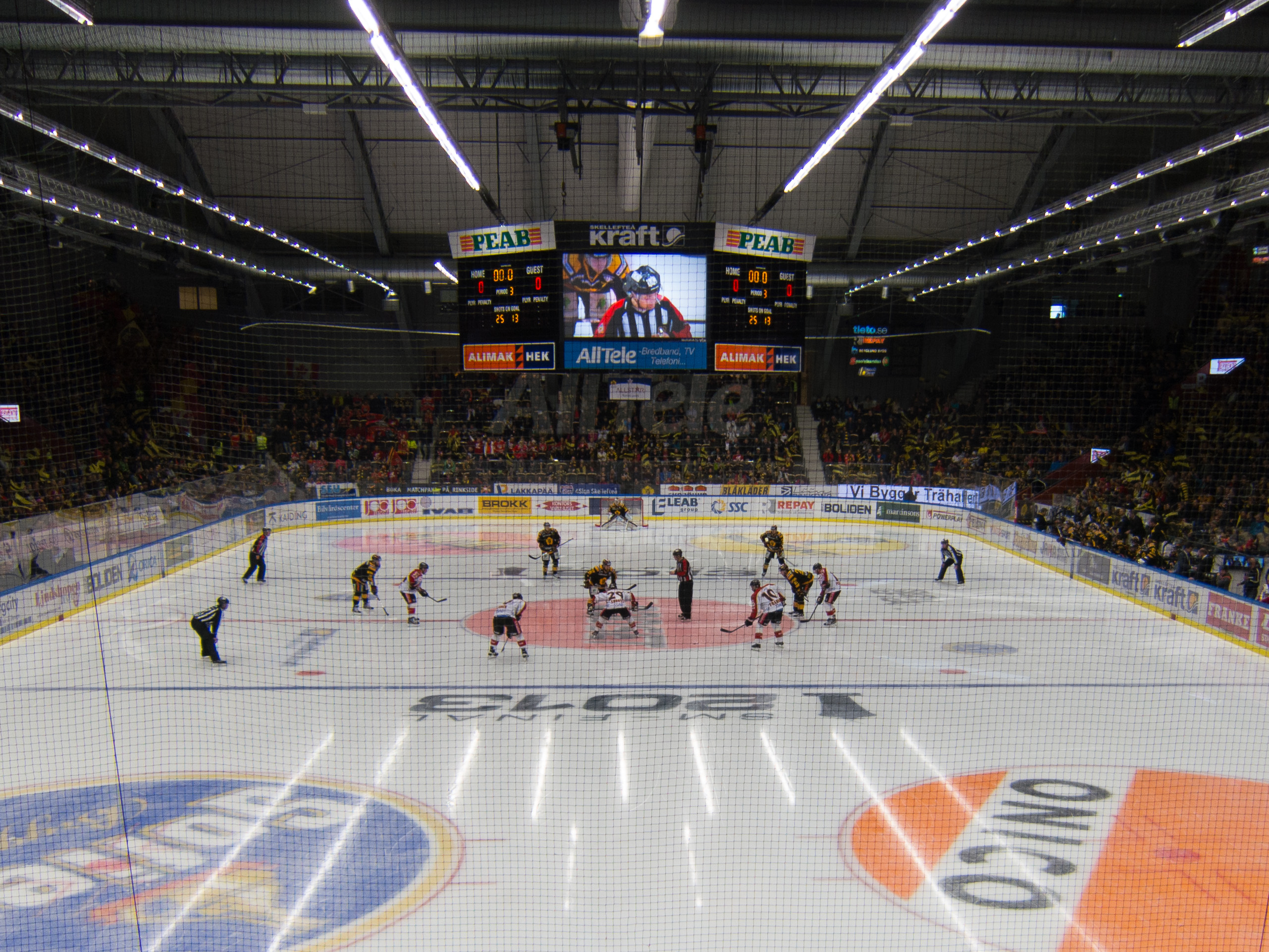
Skellefteå AIK - Luleå HF Finals 2013, Game 1

== See also ==
- List of indoor arenas in Sweden
- List of indoor arenas in Nordic countries
