= Lotta Engberg discography =

This is the discography of Swedish pop singer Lotta Engberg.

== Studio albums ==
Solo

Year	Album	Peak chart positions
Year	Album	SWE
1987	Fyra Bugg & en Coca Cola	27
1988	100%	40
2016	Lotta på Liseberg	45

As dansband Lotta & Anders Engbergs orkester

Year	Album	Peak chart positions
Year	Album	SWE
1989	Genom vatten och eld	48
1990	En gång till	–
1991	Världens bästa servitris	–
1992	Stora rubriker	30
1993	Kärlek gör mig tokig	33

As dansband Lotta Engbergs

Year	Album	Peak chart positions
Year	Album	SWE
1994	Våra nya vingar (credited to Lotta Engbergs orkester)	–
1996	Äntligen på väg	13
1997	Tolv i topp	23
1998	Åh vad jag älskade dig just då	22
1999	Tjejer & snubbar, kärringar & gubbar	50
2000	Vilken härlig dag	17

Joint albums

Year	Album	Peak chart positions
Year	Album	SWE
1987	Kvinna & man (Lotta Engberg & Jarl Carlsson)	–
2012	Lotta & Christer (Lotta Engberg & Christer Sjögren)	2
2012	Heroes (Willie Nelson & Lotta Engberg)	34

== Compilation albums ==
Solo compilation albums

Year	Album	Peak chart positions
Year	Album	SWE
2003	Fyra bugg & en Coca Cola och andra hits	–
2006	Världens bästa Lotta	17
2006	Jul hos mig	2
2007	När du tar mig i din famn	–
2007	Alla lyckliga stunder	–
2009	Upp till dans	–

Lotta & Anders Engbergs orkester compilation

Year	Album	Peak chart positions
Year	Album	SWE
1992	På begäran	–
1995	Tusen vackra bilder	–

Lotta Engbergs compilation albums

Year	Album	Peak chart positions
Year	Album	SWE
1998	Håll om mig nu	–
2000	Stanna en stund	–

Kikki, Bettan & Lotta compilation albums

Year	Album	Peak chart positions
Year	Album	SWE
2002	20 år med oss – Vem é dé du vill ha	–

== Live albums ==
Kikki, Bettan & Lotta live albums

Year	Album	Peak chart positions
Year	Album	SWE
2002	Live från Rondo	–

== Singles ==
Solo singles

Year	Single	Peak chart positions	Notes	Album
Year	Single	SWE	Notes	Album
1987	"Fyra bugg & En Coca Cola"	19	"Fyra bugg & en Coca Cola" also known as "Boogaloo "Winner of Melodifestivalen 1987 and Eurovision Song Contest 1987	Fyra bugg & en Coca Cola
1987	"Succéschottis"	–		Fyra bugg & en Coca Cola
1990	"En gång till"	–	Melodifestivalen 1990 entry	Äntligen på väg
1996	"Juliette & Jonathan"	51	Melodifestivalen 1996 entry	Äntligen på väg
2009	"Äntligen december"	–		Jul hos mig

Singles as Kikki, Bettan & Lotta

Year	Single	Peak chart positions	Notes	Album
Year	Single	SWE	Notes	Album
2002	"Vem é dé du vill ha"	32	Melodifestivalen 2002 entry	

Joint singles and featured in

Year	Single	Peak chart positions	Notes	Album
Year	Single	SWE	Notes	Album
1984	"Sankta Cecilia" (duet with Göran Folkestad)	–	Double A side single with "Du"	
1987	"Världens lyckligaste par" (duet with Lasse Stefanz)"	–		
1987	"Världens lyckligaste par" (duet with Olle Jönsson)"	–		Världens bästa lotta
1987	"100%" (duet with Triple & Touch)"	–	Melodifestivalen 1988 entry	Världens bästa lotta
1988	"Ringar på vatten" (duet with Haakon Pedersen)"	–	With Side B as "Kan man gifta sig i jeans?"	
2008	"Det måste gå" (duet with Lasse Holm)"	–		

Lotta & Anders Engsbergs orkester

(Svensktoppen songs)

- 1989: "Melodin"
- 1989: "Genom vatten och eld"
- 1989: "En gång till"
- 1990: "Tusen vackra builder"
- 1991: "Världens bästa servitris"
- 1992: "Tusen skäl att stanna"
- 1992: "Allt jag vill säga"
- 1993: "Alla lyckliga stunder"

Lotta Engsbergs Svensktoppen songs

(Svensktoppen songs)

- 1994: "Våra nya vingar"
- 1994: "Någon"
- 1995: "Ringen på mitt finger"
- 1996: "Håll om mig nu"
- 1996: "Juliette & Jonathan"
- 1998: "Åh vad jag älskade dig just då"
- 1998: "Var rädda om kärleken"
- 1998: "Om jag bara kunde"
- 1999: "Inget mera regn"
- 1999: "Tjejer & snubbar, kärringar & gubbar"
- 1999: "Stanna en stund"
- 2000: "En liten stund på Jorden"
- 2000: "Brinner för dej"
- 2001: "Vilken härlig dag"
- 2001: "Blå, blå är himmelen" (failed to enter the list)
