= På begäran (Lotta & Anders Engbergs orkester album) =

Compilation album by Lotta & Anders Engbergs Orkester
- Released: 3 January 1992
- Genre: Dansband music
- Label: NMG

På begäran is a compilation album from Swedish dansband Lotta & Anders Engbergs Orkester, released on 3 January 1992. Some songs on the album are Lotta Engberg solo.

== Track listing ==
1. Fyra Bugg & en Coca Cola
2. Tusen vackra bilder
3. Världens bästa servitris
4. En gång till
5. Skön Cecilia
6. Yakety Sax
7. Melodin
8. På min sommaräng (My Boy Lollipop)
9. 100%
10. Succéschottis
11. True Love
12. Kan man gifta sig i jeans?
13. Brevet från Maria på Öland
14. Genom vatten och eld
15. Så många barn
16. Två ska man va' (I'm Gonna Knock on Your Door)
