= Live från Rondo =

Compilation album by Kikki, Bettan & Lotta
- Released: 14 February 2003
- Recorded: 11 December 2002; Rondo, Gothenburg, Sweden (CD1); 1981-2002 (CD 2)
- Genre: Country, Pop
- Length: 73 minutes (CD 1); 49 minutes (CD 2)
- Label: Mariann Grammofon AB

Kikki, Bettan & Lotta chronology
20 år med oss - Vem é dé du vill ha (2002)	Live från Rondo (2003)

Live från Rondo was released on 14 February 2003 and is an album from singer trio Kikki Danielsson, Elisabeth Andreassen och Lotta Engberg, who then sang together as Kikki, Bettan & Lotta. CD 1 is a live record, where the recording is from Rondo in Gothenburg, Sweden on 11 December 2002. CD 2 is a studio record. The album peaked at number 15 on the Swedish Albums Chart.

== Track listing ==
=== CD 1 (Live från Rondo) ===
1. God afton
2. Intåg
3. Åh vad jag älskade dig just då - Lotta
4. Papaya Coconut - Kikki
5. Danse mot vår - Bettan
6. Country-medley
  1. 9 to 5 - Kikki
  2. Man, I feel Like a Woman - Bettan
  3. Take Me Home Country Road - Lotta
  4. One Dance, One Rose, One Kiss - Bettan & Lotta
  5. Stand by Your Man - Kikki
7. Så länge skutan kan gå - Bettan
8. Feels Like Home
9. Juliette & Jonathan - Lotta
10. Killarna i mitt band
11. Amazing Grace - Kikki
12. Hit-parad
  1. Dag efter dag - Bettan & Kikki
  2. Kär och galen - Lotta
  3. Miss Decibel - Kikki
  4. Då lyser en sol - Bettan
  5. Having a Party
  6. 100%
  7. Dag efter dag
13. Vem é dé du vill ha
14. Schlager-medley
  1. Fyra Bugg & en Coca Cola - Lotta
  2. Bra vibrationer - Kikki
  3. La det swinge - Bettan
15. Sångerna som för oss tätt tillsammans

=== CD 2 (bonus-CD) ===
1. Fri - Kikki
2. Danse mot vår - Bettan
3. Håll om mig nu - Lotta
4. Han pendlar varje dag (Morning Train) - Bettan
5. Rör vid mig - Kikki
6. Tennessee Waltz - Lotta
7. En enda morgon (Angel of the Morning) - Bettan
8. Easy Come, Easy Go - Kikki
9. Sången han sjöng var min egen - Lotta
10. Så skimrande var aldrig havet - Bettan
11. Nära dig - Kikki
12. Brevet från Maria på Öland - Lotta
13. Lämna mig inte - Kikki
14. Lipstick on Your Collar - Bettan
15. Jag har börjat leva nu - Kikki
16. Having a Party - Chips

=== Contributing musicians ===
- Leif Ottebrand - Kapellmeister, arrangements and keyboards
- Henrik Gad - Saxophone
- Håkan Glänte - Keyboards and choir
- Peter Johansson - Trombone
- Mats Johansson - Guitar
- Per Strandberg - Bass and choir
- Miko Rezler - drums

== Charts ==
Chart (2003)	Peak position
Sweden (Sverigetopplistan)	15
