= Tusen vackra bilder =

Single by Lotta & Anders Engbergs orkester

from the album Världens bästa servitris
- A-side: "Tusen vackra bilder"
- B-side: "Ett skratt förlänger livet"
- Released: 1990
- Genre: dansband music
- Label: Doreme
- Songwriters: Mikael Wendt, Christer Lundh

Lotta & Anders Engbergs orkester singles chronology
| "En gång till" (1990) | "Tusen vackra bilder" (1990) | "Antonio" / "All My Loving" (1990) |

"Tusen vackra bilder" (translated to English is "A thousand beautiful pictures") is a song written by Mikael Wendt and Christer Lundh, and originally performed by Lotta & Anders Engbergs orkester. It charted at Svensktoppen for 17 weeks during the period of 2 December 1990. – 14 April 1991.

The song was also released as a 1990 single, with "Ett skratt förlänger livet" (translated to English is "A laugh prolongs life") as a B-side, and became a major hit, finishing up second at Hänt i veckan's song contest that year. The song also became available in Lotta & Anders Engbergs orkester's 1991 studio album "Världens bästa servitris", as well as the 2006 compilation album "Världens bästa Lotta" from 2006 by Lotta Engberg.

Stig Lorentz orkester & Diana recorded the song on the 1991 album "Här och nu". The same year the song was also recorded by Spotlights, and by Mats Bergmans, on the album Mats Bergmans.

== Single track listing ==
1. "Tusen vackra bilder"
2. "Ett skratt förlänger livet"
