= TV-aksjonen =

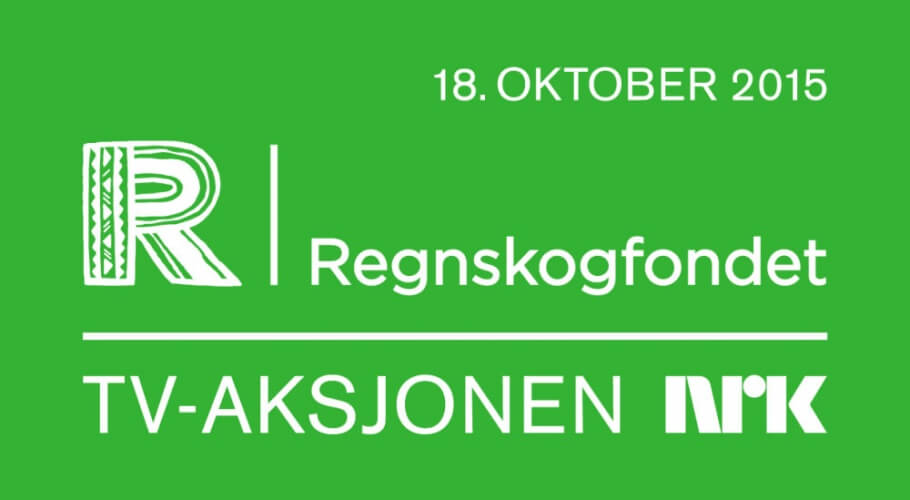
- Logo for the 2015 TV campaign devoted to the Norwegian Rainforest Foundation.
- Status: Active
- Genre: Charitable fundraiser
- Date: A chosen Sunday in October
- Frequency: Annually
- Venue: NRK
- Country: Norway
- Years active: 52
- Inaugurated: October 6, 1974
- Most recent: October 19, 2025
- Next event: October 2026
- Website: www.nrk.no/tvaksjonen/

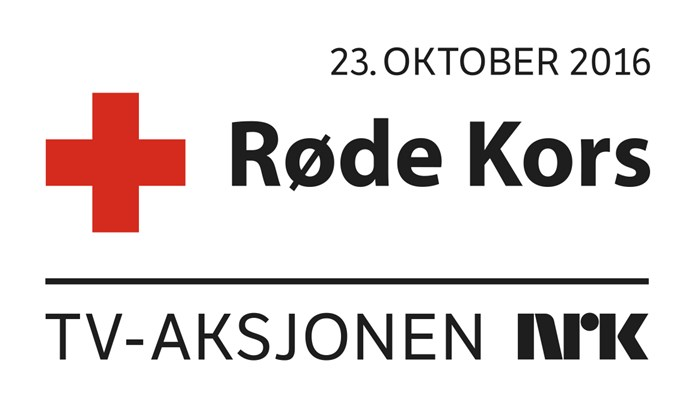
Logo for the 2016 TV campaign, with the proceeds going to the Norwegian Red Cross. The campaign raised 229.7 million NOK ($28.8 million) to aid for people in Syria, South Sudan, Afghanistan, Somalia, Myanmar and Central America, including access to medication and health aid.

TV-aksjonen (English: "The TV Campaign/Auction") is an annual national Norwegian charity fund raising event that since 1974 has been run by Norwegian public broadcaster NRK in conjunction with selected organizations. The fundraiser is the world's largest, measured in terms of donated value per capita and number of participants. The event is central to Norwegian society inasmuch as it is viewed as the most famous and trusted charity fundraiser in the country. The campaign is held on a Sunday in October each year, and on the selected day NRK devotes most of its airtime to informing the public about the organization and that year's special cause.

The beneficiary of each year's event is decided by a fund-raising committee at NRK, which also receives detailed follow-up reports from the selected charity on the spending of the raised money. Charities vary, with causes including combating poverty, providing healthcare, clearing minefields and munitions, protecting women, and the environment. The Norwegian Refugee Council and Norwegian Church Aid are the organizations which have the most campaigns run for their benefit, with five and four fundraisers, respectively. Funds have also been earmarked to assist displaced persons in Armenia, Azerbaijan, Burundi, Angola, and Uganda (1998), and refugees from wars in Afghanistan, Pakistan, Democratic Republic of the Congo, Sudan, Somalia, the Palestinian territories, and Colombia (2010).

Contributions are collected in a number of ways. Central to the campaign is the door-to-door campaign of approximately 100,000 volunteers servicing all 1.8 million Norwegian households, as well as donations accepted via telephone or by funds transfer to the campaign's bank account. NRK also hosts a live auction of various items and experiences, with proceeds also going to that year's selected charity. Several organizations donate considerable amounts, as does the government of Norway on behalf of the Norwegian people.

Since its inception, a total of about 9 billion NOK ($1.1 billion USD) has been raised as of 2017. (Note: Sum of all amount results (adjusted to 2017 NOK and USD respectively).)

== List of campaigns ==
Year	Charity	Campaign name (tagline)	Cause	Amount raised (in NOK millions)	Amount adjusted to January 2017 NOK (in millions)	Converted to 2017 USD (in millions)
1974	Norwegian Refugee Council	Flyktning-74; English: "Refugee '74"	Development aid	22.5	133.3	16.7
1975	Norwegian Women's Public Health Association	Revmatismeåret; English: "Rheumatism-year"		10	52.9	6.63
1976	Norwegian Association of the Blind	Regnbueaksjonen; English: "Rainbow Campaign"		13.5	66.1	8.3
1977	Norwegian Church Aid	Nødhjelp-77; English: "Emergency relief '77"	Development aid	54.5	242.9	30.4
1978	Save the Children Norway	Aksjon-78; English: "Campaign '78"		42.7	176	22
1979	Norwegian Refugee Council	Flyktning-79; English: "Refugee '79"		74.1	293.9	36.8
1980	Norwegian Cancer Society	Kreftaksjonen-80; English: "Cancer Campaign '80"	Cancer research and aid to cancer patients	79.7	279.9	35.1
1981	Norwegian Red Cross, Norwegian Association of the Blind, Norwegian Association of the Disabled, Norwegian Association of the Mentally Retarded	Et nytt liv English: "A New Life"		84.9	264.3	33.1
1982	Norwegian Missionary Council	Aksjon Håp; English: "Campaign: Hope"		86.7	242.4	30.4
1983	Norwegian People's Aid	Menneskeverd; English: "Human dignity"	Human dignity	69.4	180.5	22.6
1984	Amnesty International	Aksjon Amnesty; English: "Campaign: Amnesty"	Work for human rights	81	198.8	24.9
1985	National Council of Children and Youth Organizations of Norway	Ungdomskampanjen 85; English: "Youth Campaign '85"		79	183.5	23
1986	Norwegian Church Aid	Hjelp uten grenser English: "Aid without borders"	Development aid	110	235.1	29.5
1987	National Association for Public Health	Hjerte for livet English: "A Heart for life"		115	228.5	28.6
1988	Norwegian Refugee Council	På flukt English: "In flight"	Development aid	96.9	181.1	22.7
1989	"Women in the Third World" (joint effort) (Note: The 1989 campaign was arranged as a cooperative effort between 41 organizations, among them Norwegian National Women's Council)	Kvinner i den 3. verden English: "Women in the Third World"	Development aid specially targeted to women	88.2	158.1	19.8
1990	Save the Children Norway	En himmel full av stjerner English: "A Sky Full of Stars"		139	238.1	29.8
1991	Atlas Alliance	Et nytt liv English: "A New Life"	People with disabilities in developing countries	102	170.5	21.4
1992	Norwegian Council for Mental Health	Psykisk helse English: "Physical Health"	Treatment of mental disorders	90	147.1	18.4
1993	Norwegian Red Cross	Grenseløs omsorg English: "Care without borders/limitless care"	Development aid	133	213.1	26.7
1994	Norwegian People's Aid	Aksjon menneskeverd English: "Campaign: Human Dignity"	Development aid	123	193.8	24.3
1995	Salvation Army	Omsorg for hele mennesket English: "Care for all of man"	Aid to the poor in countries such as Haiti, India, Russia and Bosnia	148.4	228.6	28.6
1996	"Environment for life" (joint effort) (Note: The 1996 Campaign was a joint effort between Future In Our Hands, Norwegian Society for the Conservation of Nature, Rainforest Foundation Norway, Development Fund and World Wide Fund for Nature)	Miljø for livet English: "Environment for Life"	Aid for environmental focus	77	116.6	14.6
1997	Norwegian Cancer Society	Krafttak mot kreft English: "Effort against cancer"	Testing of new methods of treatment and diagnosing	177	262.6	32.9
1998	Norwegian Refugee Council	På flukt i eget land English: "In flight within one's country"	Informing of the situation of those internally displaced	128	185.7	23.3
1999	Amnesty International	Din innsats – andres frihet! English: "Your effort — other's freedom!"	Strengthen the work for human rights in ten selected countries	128.5	181.9	22.8
2000	SOS Children's Villages	SOS-barnebyer; English: "SOS Children's Villages"	Aid to orphaned children, especially in Colombia, Haiti, India, Russia and Zimbabwe	153	210	26.3
2001	Norwegian Church Aid	Livskraft mot hiv/aids English: "Vitality against HIV/AIDS"	Development projects	140.1	188.1	23.6
2002	Atlas Alliance	Et nytt liv English: "A New Life"	Disabled people in developing countries	145	191.2	24
2003	Save the Children Norway	Redd Barna; English: "Save the Children"	Aid to children in Guatemala, Nicaragua, Uganda, Ethiopia, Cambodia and Norway	158.3	205.4	25.7
2004	Church City Mission and Norwegian Council for Mental Health	Hjerterom; English: "Hospitality"	Treatment of mental illness	151	193.2	24.2
2005	Forum for Women and Development (Note: The 2005 Campaign was devoted to FOKUS, a union of 72 women organizations)	Drømmefanger; English: "Dreamcatcher"	Aid to women subject to violence in poor countries	137	172.2	21.6
2006	Doctors Without Borders	De glemte humanitære krisene English: "The forgotten humanitarian crises"		206	252.2	31.6
2007	UNICEF, Norwegian Olympic and Paralympic Committee and Confederation of Sports, Right To Play	Sammen for barn English: "Together for children"	Prevention and aid of HIV/AIDS among children	220	270	33.8
2008	Norwegian Blue Cross	I sentrum står et menneske English: "In the center is a person"	Prevention, treatment and monitoring of alcohol and drug abuse	192	223.5	28
2009	Norwegian CARE	Sterkere sammen English: "Stronger together"	Aiding poverty	194	224.3	28.1
2010	Norwegian Refugee Council	På flukt fra krig English: "In flight from war"	Aid to refugees from war	208.5	236.1	29.6
2011	Norwegian People's Aid	Vi rydder for livet English: "We're clearing for life"	Clearing of minefields and cluster munitions in Africa, Asia, Europe and the Middle-East.	218.9	244.7	30.7
2012	Norwegian Amnesty International	Stå opp mot urett! English: "Rise against injustice!"	Working towards uncovering large human rights abuses across the world.	198.7	219.8	27.5
2013	National Association for Public Health	Dagene som forsvinner English: "The days that disappear"	Working towards bettering the quality of life of those suffering from dementia	224.2	242.1	30.3
2014	Norwegian Church Aid	Vann forandrer alt English: "Water changes everything"	Securing access to clean water and safe sanitation in several countries in Africa and Asia	253	267.2	33.5
2015	Rainforest Foundation Norway (Note: The 2015 campaign was co-hosted by English musician Sting.)	Vi kan fortsatt redde regnskogen English: "We can still save the rainforest"	Working to preserve the rain-forest in more larger areas of Brazil, Peru, Congo and New Guinea	183	189	23.7
2016	Norwegian Red Cross	Sammen får vi hjelpen helt frem English: "Together we get the help all the way"	Work towards aid to people in Syria, South Sudan, Afghanistan, Somalia, Myanmar and Central America, including access to medicines and health aid. 10% of total amount went to domestic efforts such as asylum center activities and health centers for paperless refugees.	230.6	229.7	28.8
2017	UNICEF Norway committee	Læring i krig English: "Education in War"	Providing education to children affected by war and conflict in Colombia, Mali, Syria, Pakistan and South Sudan.	217.7	217.7	27.2
2018	Church City Mission	Kom inn English: "Enter"		244.5	—N/a	—N/a
2019	CARE Norway	Nå er det hennes tur English "It's her turn now"	Give women in some of the world's poorest countries the opportunity to build a better life for themselves, their families and their communities.	240.5		
2020	World Wide Fund for Nature	Gå for et hav av muligheter English "Go for an ocean of possibilities"	To remove plastic from the oceans.	228.4		
2021	Plan International Norge	Barn, ikke brud English "Child, not bride"	To stop girls in Bangladesh, Niger, Nepal, Malawi and Mali from getting married as children.	243.3		

== Awards and nominations ==
Year	Organization	Category	Nominee(s)	Result	Ref.
2017	Gullruten	Best Event or Sports Broadcasting	—N/a	Nominated	
