= Vilken härlig dag =

Studio album by Lotta Engbergs
- Released: 18 September 2000
- Recorded: 2000
- Genre: Dansband music, folk songs
- Length: 43 minutes
- Label: Nordiska musikgruppen

Lotta Engbergs chronology
Stanna en stund (2000)	Vilken härlig dag (2000)

Vilken härlig dag is a studio album from Swedish dansband Lotta Engbergs, released on 18 September 2000. The album was more singer-songwriter-inspired than earlier albums, and it was the last album from Lotta Engbergs. The album peaked at 17th place on the Swedish album chart. It was also the last Lotta Engbergs album before the band disbanded in 2002.

== Track listing ==
#	Title	Songwriter	Length
1.	"Vilken härlig dag"	Hans Backström, Peter Bergqvist	?
2.	"En liten stund på Jorden"	Mikael Wendt, Christer Lundh	?
3.	"Brinner för dig"	Per-Arne Tigerberg, Jan Broman	?
4.	"Blå, blå är himmelen"	Steve Eriksson	?
5.	"Bang en boomerang"	Benny Andersson, Björn Alvaeus, Stikkan Anderson	?
6.	"Dröm om mig (Save Your Love) (duet Lotta Engberg-Peter Åhs)"	John Edward, Sue Edward, Britt Lindeborg, Anne-Marie Nilsson	?
7.	"Så tokig var jag i dig"	Fredrik Möller, Ola Hallberg	?
8.	"Det vackraste av ord"	Henrik Sethsson, Jana Wähämäki	?
9.	"Tennessee Waltz"	Redd Stewart, Pee Wee King	?
10.	"Stunderna av lycka"	Thomas Thörnholm, Camilla Andersson, Danne Attlerud	?
11.	"Kom"	Henrik Sethsson, Jana Wähämäki	?
12.	"Som en stjärnas ljus"	Tommy Kaså	?
13.	"Lyckan ler mot mig"	Mikael Wendt, Christer Lundh	?
14.	"För kärleken"	Hans Backström, Peter Bergqvist	?

== Contributing musicians ==
- Lotta Engberg, song
- Peter Ljung, piano
- Lasse Wellander, guitar
- Prem Sandell, percussion instruments
- Pernilla Emme, song

== Hits ==
Many of the songs from the album was tested for the hit list Svensktoppen.

=== Blå, blå är himmelen ===
Blå, blå är himmelen, written by Steve Eriksson, failed on 25 August 2001 to enter Svensktoppen.

=== Brinner för dig ===
Brinner för dig was on Svensktoppen for two rounds, 2 December 2000 (7th) and 9 December 2000 (8th).

=== En liten stund på Jorden ===
The biggest hit from the album was the ballad-inspired En liten stund på Jorden, which during its 12 rounds long visit on Svensktoppen from 10 June to 25 August 2000, at best was placed 5th, which happened on 29 July 2000. En liten stund på Jorden was written by Christer Lundh and Mikael Wendt, and a theme in the song is walking in the forest.

=== Vilken härlig dag ===
Vilken härlig dag is also the first track on the album. The song Vilken härlig dag is about summer and was written by Torgny Söderberg. On 3 February 2001 Vilken härlig dag achieved 10th place at Svensktoppen, and on 10 February 2001 it reached 9th place. Then it was knocked out from Svensktoppen.

== Charts ==
Chart (2000)	Peak position
Sweden (Sverigetopplistan)	17
