= Genom vatten och eld (song) =

Song by Lotta & Anders Engbergs orkester

from the album Genom vatten och eld
- Language: Swedish
- Released: 1989
- Songwriter: Torgny Söderberg

Genom vatten och eld is a song written by Torgny Söderberg, and originally recorded by Lotta & Anders Engbergs orkester on the 1989 studio album "Genom vatten och eld", and also appearing on the 2006 Lotta Engberg compilation album "Världens bästa Lotta". Becoming a major hit, it charted at Svensktoppen for eight weeks in 1989, peaking at fifth position.

In 1990 the song was recorded by Lisbet Jagedal & Pools orkester on the album Lisbeth Jagedal & Pools orkester.

In 1995, heavy metal band Black-Ingvars recorded the song on their "Whole Lotta Engberg" medley.

In the 2007 TV series "Leende guldbruna ögon", it was performed by fictional dansband Sven Bodins. This version also appear on the soundtrack album.
