= Tjejer & snubbar =

Studio album by Lotta Engbergs
- Released: 22 March 1999
- Genre: Dansband music
- Length: 48 minutes
- Label: Nordiska musikgruppen

Lotta Engbergs chronology
Håll om mig nu (1998)	Tjejer & snubbar (1999)	Stanna en stund (2000)

Tjejer & snubbar ("Girls and Boys"), also known as Tjejer & snubbar, kärringar & gubbar ("Girls and Boys, Old Ladies and Old Men"), was released in March 1999 and is a studio album from Swedish dansband Lotta Engbergs. The album peaked at #50 at the Swedish album chart.

The song "Tjejer & snubbar, kärringar & gubbar", which is on this album and was written by Bo Fransson, entered the Swedish hitlist Svensktoppen on 8 May 1999, with the third place in the first round as best result. On 26 June 1999 the song was "knocked out" from Svensktoppen after seven rounds. The song "Tjejer & snubbar, kärringar & gubbar" uses a "humorist" and "happy" way to talk about getting older. A children's choir was used in the refrains of that song. The album reached the 50th place at the Swedish album chart.

== Track listing ==
#	Title	Songwriter	Length
1.	"Tjejer & snubbar, kärringar & gubbar"	Ulf Georgsson, Bo Fransson	?
2.	"Stanna en stund"	Torbjörn Karlström	?
3.	"Inget mera regn"	Tommy Kaså	?
4.	"Vi grälar och vi älskar" ("I Hate You then I Love You")	Tony Renis, Manuel De Falla, Alberto Testa, Fabio Testa, Norman Newell, Peter Åhs	?
5.	"Börja dagen med en sång"	Gert Lengstrand, Lasse Holm	?
6.	"Ingen jag älskar som dig"	Thomas G:son	?
7.	"Undrar du som jag"	Jaana Vähämäki, Henrik Sethsson	?
8.	"Allt och lite till"	Jörgen Persson, Jörgen Andersson	?
9.	"Som gjorda för varann"	Jörgen Persson, Jörgen Andersson	?
10.	"Vad dom än säger (No Matter What)"	Andrew Lloyd Webber, Jim Steinman, Lars Sahlin	?
11.	"Allt man kan önska sig"	Mårten Eriksson	?
12.	"Du är min stjärna"	Pär Renevall, Anders Löfgren, Lars Sandberg	?
13.	"Caroline"	Per-Anders Forsén	?
14.	"Så Solen tittar fram igen"	Pernilla Emme	?

== Charts ==
Chart (1999)	Peak position
Sweden (Sverigetopplistan)	50
