= 20 år med oss – Vem é dé du vill ha =

Compilation album by Kikki, Bettan & Lotta
- Released: 8 March 2002
- Recorded: 1978–2002
- Genre: Country, pop
- Label: Mariann Grammofon AB
- Producer: Bert Karlsson

Kikki, Bettan & Lotta chronology
20 år med oss – Vem é dé du vill ha (2002)	Live från Rondo (2003)

20 år med oss – Vem é dé du vill ha is a compilation album from the singers Kikki Danielsson, Elisabeth Andreassen and Lotta Engberg, who then sang together as the trio "Kikki, Bettan & Lotta". It was released on 8 March 2002 and sold gold in Norway and Sweden, in Norway this happened the second week after it released there. The album reached number three on the Norwegian Albums Chart.

"Vem é dé du vill ha" is the only song on this album that the trio sing together all three. However, the album also contains songs who Kikki Danielsson and Elisabeth Andreassen sang together in the Swedish pop group "Chips" in the early 1980s. The album also contained four new songs, "Vem é dé du vill ha" by Kikki, Bettan & Lotta, "Hela världen öppnar sig" and "Klia mej på ryggen" by Lotta and "Easy Come, Easy Go" and "Jag har börjat leva nu" by Kikki. However, "Klia mej på ryggen" was a cover version of a 2001 Björnes song.

== Track listing ==
No.	Title	Writer(s)	Length
1.	"Vem é dé du vill ha"	Kikki, Bettan & Lotta
2.	"Fri"	Kikki
3.	"Hela världen öppnar sig"	Lotta
4.	"Dag efter dag"	Chips
5.	"Då lyser en sol"	Bettan
6.	"100%"	Lotta
7.	"Our Love is over"	Chips
8.	"La det swinge"	Bobbysocks!
9.	"Klia mej på ryggen"	Lotta
10.	"Bra vibrationer"	Kikki
11.	"Ängel i natt (The Power of Love)"	Bettan
12.	"Fyra Bugg & en Coca Cola"	Lotta
13.	"Easy Come, Easy Go"	Kikki
14.	"Lys og varme"	Bettan
15.	"Juliette & Jonathan"	Lotta
16.	"Jag har börjat leva nu"	Kikki
17.	"Together Again"	Bettan
18.	"Miss Decibel"	Wizex
19.	"Sankta Cecilia"	Lotta & Göran Folkestad
20.	"I evighet"	Bettan

== Charts ==
Chart (1981)	Peak position
Norwegian Albums (VG-lista)	3
