= Världens bästa servitris (song) =

Song by Lotta & Anders Engbergs orkester

from the album Världens bästa servitris
- Language: Swedish
- Released: 1991
- Genre: dansband music, schlager
- Label: Doreme
- Songwriters: Mikael Wendt, Christer Lundh

"Världens bästa servitris" is a song written by Mikael Wendt and Christer Lundh, and originally recorded by Lotta & Anders Engbergs orkester, scoring a Svensktoppen hit between the period of 7–21 April 1991. The song became available on the 1991 Lotta & Anders Engbergs orkester studio album "Världens bästa servitris", as well as 2006 Lotta Engberg compilation album "Världens bästa Lotta".

The song is also known after the opening lines Här i stan ligger ett kondis nere vid torget. Becoming a huge hit, the lyrics are about a waitress who according to the song text is the best waitress in the world, and the waitress works at a café located nearby the town square in a town.

In 1996 the song was recorded by Flinckman on the EP Flinckmans fyra.

In 1995, heavy metal band Black-Ingvars recorded the song on their medley single "Whole Lotta Engberg".
