= Big Bag (disambiguation) =

Big Bag is a live action television puppet program that aired from 1996 to 1998.

Big Bag may also refer to:

- Flexible intermediate bulk container
- Big Bag Records, distributor of Genom vatten och eld etc.
- Big Bag trap, see Battle of Pszczyna

== See also ==
- Big Bags, album by Milt Jackson
- BigAirBAG, Dutch enterprise developing cushion
- Big Brown Bag
