= En gång till =

En gång till may refer to:

- Swedish for the phrase "One more time"
- En gång till (Lotta & Anders Engbergs orkester album), 1990
  - "En gång till" (song), the title song
- En gång till (KSMB album), 1993
- En gång till (TV4), a TV-programme on TV4
