= Arne Husveg =

Norwegian disability rights activist

- Born: 11 February 1933; Stavanger
- Died: 16 November 2004 (aged 71); Oslo
- Known for: Secretary-general of the Norwegian Association of the Blind and Partially Sighted (1971–1994); Chair of the Norwegian Association of the Blind and Partially Sighted (1969–1971); Chair of the Norwegian Federation of Organisations of Disabled People (1979–1983)

Arne Husveg (11 February 1933 – 16 November 2004) was a Norwegian organizational leader and disability rights activist.

He was born in Stavanger, and became blind at the age of 2. He took his examen artium in 1952, studied at the universities of Exeter, Vienna and Florence until 1955 and worked for some years as a translator. From 1963 to 1971 he worked as a physiotherapist.

Husveg was a co-founder of the Norwegian Federation of Organisations of Disabled People already in 1950. He was also involved in the Norwegian Association of the Blind and Partially Sighted, and participated at their national convention for the first time in 1951. He chaired the organization for one term, from 1969 to 1971, and from 1971 to 1994 he was employed as their secretary-general.

He also chaired the Federation of Organisations of Disabled People from 1979 to 1983, having been a board member from 1969 to 1979. He co-founded the European Blind Union in 1984, and was board member for many years as well as president from 1987 to 1996. From 2000 to his death he was vice president of the World Blind Union. He represented the Socialist Left Party in Oslo city council.

Arne Husveg was decorated with the Royal Norwegian Order of St. Olav and the World Blind Union's highest award, the Louis Braille Medal. He was married twice—in 1956, he married Anne Bolley and in 1987, he married college lecturer Else Momrak Haugan. He died in November 2004 in Oslo.
