= Äntligen på väg =

Äntligen på väg may refer to:

- Äntligen på väg (Ted Gärdestad album), 1994 album from Swedish singer Ted Gärdestad
- Äntligen på väg (Lotta Engbergs album), 1996 album from Swedish "dansband" Lotta Engbergs
