= Tjejer =

Tjejer, a slang term for "girls" in Swedish, may refer to:

- Tjejer (album), by Arvingarna, 1994
- Tjejer, an album by Drifters, 1984
- "Tjejer", a song by Kikki Danielsson from Ett hus med många rum, 1997
- "Tjejer", a song by Magnus Uggla from Allting som ni gör kan jag göra bättre, 1987

== See also ==
- Tjejer & snubbar, a 1999 album by Lotta Engbergs
