= Tolv i topp =

Studio album by Lotta Engbergs
- Released: 16 June 1997
- Genre: Dansband music
- Length: 50 minutes
- Label: Nordiska musikgruppen

Lotta Engbergs chronology
Äntligen på väg (1996)	Tolv i topp (1997)	Åh vad jag älskade dig just då (1998)

Tolv i topp is a 1997 cover album from Swedish dansband Lotta Engbergs, mostly featuring covers from 1960s and 1970s hits/schlagers. The album was recorded after Lotta Engberg in 1996 hosted the TV show "Fem i topp" in TV4, and sung the songs. The album was released in the name of the dansband Lotta Engbergs. The album peaked at # 23 at the Swedish album chart.

== Track listing ==
#	Title	Songwriter	Length
1.	"Leva livet (It's My Party)"	Herbert Wiener, John Gluck, Wally Gold, Stikkan Anderson	?
2.	"Lyckliga gatan (Il ragazzo della via Gluck)"	Adriano Celentano, Mariano Detto, Britt Lindeborg	?
3.	"Sånt är livet (You Can Have Her)"	Bill Cook, Stig Rossner	?
4.	"Fernando"	Benny Andersson, Stikkan Anderson, Björn Ulvaeus	?
5.	"Vilken härlig dag (La Felicidad)" duet Lotta Engberg-Sten Nilsson	Palito Ortega, Per-Anders Boquist	?
6.	"Sången han sjöng var min egen (Killing Me Softly With His Song)"	Charles Fox, Bo-Erik Rehnberg	?
7.	"Gammaldags musik (Good Old Fashioned Music)"	Gary Sulsh, Stewart Leathwood, Bruno Glenmark	?
8.	"När du tar mig i din famn"	Agnetha Fältskog, Fältskog	?
9.	"Jag önskar att det alltid vore sommar (It Might as Well Rain Until September)"	Gerry Goffin, Carole King, Bengt Palmers, Bodil Olsson	?
10	"En sång en gång för länge sen (Green, Green Grass of Home)"	Curly Putman, Stikkan Anderson	?
11.	"Det finns ingenting att hämta (Blame it on the Bossa Nova)"	Barry Mann, Cynthia Weil, Stikkan Anderson	?
12.	"Där björkarna susa"	Oskar Merikanto, Jussi Snellman	?

== Chart positions ==
Chart (1997)	Peak position
Sweden (Sverigetopplistan)	23
