= Airbag (disambiguation) =

An airbag is a device designed to inflate rapidly in a collision.

Airbag may also refer to:

- Airbag (film), a 1997 Spanish film
- "Airbag", a song from Radiohead's 1997 album, OK Computer
- Airbag / How Am I Driving?, a 1998 Radiohead EP
- Airbag (band), an Argentine hard rock band
- Mozilla Airbag, crash reporting software

== See also ==
- Air bag vest, worn by motorcyclists and equestrian competitors
- BigAirBAG, a brand of cushion used to improve safety at snow sport competitions
- Air suspension for vehicles, initially referred to as airbags
- Blobbing, a pastime involving the use large air bags as water trampolines
- Pneumatic lifting bag, an inflatable air bag used to lift heavy objects
