= Hofgaard =

Hofgaard is a surname. Notable people with the surname include:

- Elias Hofgaard (1856–1906), Norwegian pioneer educator for deaf people
- Signe Hofgaard (1901–1998), Norwegian dancer, choreographer and organizational leader
- Tor Levin Hofgaard (born 1968), Norwegian psychologist
