= Kärlek gör mig tokig =

Studio album by Lotta & Anders Engbergs Orkester
- Released: June 1993
- Recorded: 1993
- Genre: Dansband music
- Length: 47 minutes
- Label: Doreme Records AB

Lotta & Anders Engbergs Orkester chronology
Stora rubriker (1992)	Kärlek gör mig tokig (1993)	På begäran (1994)

Kärlek gör mig tokig is a 1993 studio album from Swedish "dansband" Lotta & Anders Engbergs Orkester. It peaked at #33 at the Swedish album chart. By early 1994, the album was awarded a Grammis award for as "best dansband of 1993".

== Track listing ==
1. "Kärlek gör mig tokig"
2. "Alla lyckliga stunder"
3. "Kär och galen"
4. "Breaking up is Hard to Do"
5. "Farbror Max"
6. "Aldrig nånsin glömmer jag dig (Hopelessly Devoted to You)"
7. "Livet börjar nu"
8. "Vägen till ditt hjärta"
9. "Ännu en vacker dag"
10. "Mammas flicka"
11. "Karl Johan"
12. "Livets gåta" (instrumental)
13. "Flamingo"
14. "Ingen är så go (Kjærlighetsvise)"

== Chart positions ==
Chart (1993)	Peak position
Sweden	33
