= Äntligen på väg (Lotta Engbergs album) =

Studio album by Lotta Engbergs
- Released: 18 March 1996
- Genre: Dansband music
- Length: 47 minutes
- Label: Nordiska musikgruppen

Lotta Engbergs chronology
| Våra nya vingar (1994) | Äntligen på väg (1996) | Tolv i topp (1997) |

Äntligen på väg is a 1996 studio album from Swedish singer Lotta Engbergs. The album peaked at #13 on the Swedish album chart.

== Track listing ==
| No. | Title | Writer(s) | Length |
|---|---|---|---|
| 1. | "Äntligen på väg" | Mikael Wendt, Christer Lundh | 2:58 |
| 2. | "När jag vilar i din famn" | Wendt, Lundh | 3:02 |
| 3. | "Juliette & Jonathan" | Torgny Söderberg, Monica Forsberg | 3:01 |
| 4. | "Lämna mig aldrig" | Söderberg, Forsberg | 4:03 |
| 5. | "I'm Gonna Rock It" | Wendt, Lundh | 3:09 |
| 6. | "Håll om mig nu" | Wendt, Lundh | 3:27 |
| 7. | "Vandrar i regnet" | Peter Åhs | 3:36 |
| 8. | "Lycklig igen" | Wendt, Lundh | 3:01 |
| 9. | "Du är helt perfekt" | Per Strandberg, Leif Ottebrand | 4:30 |
| 10. | "Högt upp i det blå" | Åke Swahn, Peter Åhs | 2:44 |
| 11. | "Jag vill ha dig och ingen annan" | Peter Bergquist, Hans Backström | 2:58 |
| 12. | "Gryningsljus" | Lars Sörås, Per Sivle, Peter Åhs | 3:31 |

== Chart positions ==
| Chart (1996) | Peak position |
|---|---|
| Sweden | 13 |
