= På begäran =

På begäran may refer to:

- På begäran (Kikki Danielsson album), a 1990 album from Swedish pop and country singer Kikki Danielsson
- På begäran 2, a 1994 album from Swedish pop and country singer Kikki Danielsson
- På begäran (Lotta & Anders Engbergs Orkester album), a 1994 album from Swedish "dansband" Lotta & Anders Engbergs Orkester
