= Tore Holden =

Norwegian ice hockey official

Tore Holden (born 27 May 1946) is a Norwegian ice hockey referee and television personality. He was active as a referee in the 1970s and 1980s and hosted game shows in the 1990s.

== Ice hockey ==
He was an accomplished ice hockey referee in the 1970s and 1980s, representing the club Sandefjord. Holden made his refereeing debut in Norway's highest league in 1973, and made his international debut in 1975. In 1988 he refereed his tenth match in the Norwegian final series.

== TV personality ==
In 1993 he was headhunted by the television channel TV 2 to host the lottery game show BingoLotto, an import from Sweden where it had millions of viewers. Holden was chosen for his popular and down-to-earth appeal, though he did not have any prior experience as a television host. The show started airing in May 1993.

The game itself was administered by a company named BingoLotto Norge. In April 1994, after a year with BingoLotto, the ratings had plummeted to 200,000 viewers and 35,000 lottery ticket buyers. The Norwegian Federation of Organisations of Disabled People, which had cooperated with TV 2, saw little of its promised share of the lottery income. BingoLotto Norge as well as the Swedish people behind BingoLotto criticized Holden's performance. The show was stopped altogether in mid-1994.

In January 1995 Holden became host of the new quiz game show Ryk eller reis. Centered on the topic of travel, this was a family-themed show in which quiz teams consisted of one young, one adult, and one elderly member from the same family. It should not be confused with Arve Juritzen's program Ryk og reis, which had aired in 1993. The season finale of Ryk eller reis was in April. At the same time, Holden worked behind the scenes on the TV 3 show Otnes Live with Ragnar Otnes.
