= 100% (Lotta Engberg album) =

- Album cover

Studio album by Lotta Engberg
- Released: March 1988
- Recorded: January–February 1988; KMH Studio, Stockholm
- Genre: Schlager
- Label: Big Bag Records

Lotta Engberg chronology
Fyra Bugg & en Coca Cola (1987)	100% (1988)	Fyra Bugg & en Coca Cola och andra hits (2003)

100% is a studio album from Lotta Engberg, released in March 1988. The album was recorded in KMH Studio in Stockholm, Sweden in January–February 1988. The album peaked at number 40 on the Swedish Albums Chart.

== Track listing ==
Side A
No.	Title	Writer(s)	English translation	Length
1.	"100%" (with Triple & Touch)	Torgny Söderberg, Monica Forsberg		2:57
2.	"Do re me"	Mikael Wendt, Anders Engberg, Christer Lundh		3:04
3.	"Två ska man va' (I'm Gonna Knock on Your Door)"	Aaron Schroeder, Sid Wayne, Lundh	You should be two	3:21
4.	"Lång natt mot gryning"	Lasse Holm, Ingela Forsman	Long night before the dawn	3:25
5.	"Fånga en vind (Rockin' Around the Christmas Tree)"	Johnny Marks, Christer Lundh	Catch a breeze	3:25
6.	""En liten mänska" (I maschi)"	Gianna Nannini, Fabio Pianigiani, Forsberg	A small human being (The males)	4:01

Side B
No.	Title	Writer(s)	English translation	Length
1.	"Kan man gifta sig i jeans?"	Lasse Holm, Ingela Forsman	Can you get married in jeans?	2:59
2.	"Två blåa ögon"	Peter Åhs, Forsman	Two blue eyes	3:05
3.	"Ge mig ett hav"	Göran Arnberg, Magnus Fermin	Give me an ocean	4:05
4.	"Pick och pack"	Torgny Söderberg, Lena Philipsson	Odds and ends	3:08
5.	"Jag gör som jag vill"	Lasse Westmann	I do what I want	2:43
6.	"À la carte"	Arnberg, Fermin		3:57

== Personnel ==
- Lotta Engberg: Vocals
- Lasse Westmann, Lilling Palmeklint, Liza Öhman-Halldén: backing vocals
- Hasse Rosén, Lasse Jonsson, Lasse Wellander: Guitars
- Pedro Johannsen, Peter Ljung: Keyboards
- Rutger Gunnarsson: Bass
- Per Lindvall: drums

== Charts ==
Weekly chart performance for 100%
Chart (1988)	Peak position
Swedish Albums (Sverigetopplistan)	40
