= Kan man gifta sig i jeans? =

Song by Lotta Engberg

from the album 100%
- Language: Swedish
- Released: 1988
- Genre: dansband music, schlager
- Label: Big Bag
- Songwriter: Ingela Forsman
- Composer: Lasse Holm

"Kan man gifta sig i jeans?", written by Lasse Holm and Ingela Forsman, is a song recorded by Lotta Engberg on the 1988 studio album 100%.

As a single, it was the B-side of the single Ringar på vatten, but became a major hit, staying at Svensktoppen during the period 15–29 May 1988.

Lyrically, the song insists that you mustn't wear dressclothes when marrying someone, and the shoes can still remain inside the bus, because the important thing according to the lyrics is love being right and correct.

A Framåt fredag version entitled "Kan man jobba klädd i jeans?" ("Can you work wearing jeans?") describe jobs where wearing dressclothes is a requirement.
