= BingoLotto (Norwegian game show) =

Norwegian television gameshow

BingoLotto is a lottery game show which aired on Norwegian television channel TV 2 from 1993 to 1994; an import of the Swedish show of the same name. It failed to garner the millions of TV viewers witnessed in Sweden, and was cancelled. In autumn 1996, an attempt was made to restart the show with a more famous host, but the attempt stranded since two consecutive governments each refused to grant a lottery concession.

== First incarnation ==
BingoLotto was imported to Norway in 1993 by the newly founded (1992) television channel TV 2. Former ice hockey referee Tore Holden was selected as host. He had no prior television experience, but was found to have a popular appeal.

The game itself was administered by a company named BingoLotto Norge. In April 1994, after a year with BingoLotto, the ratings had plummeted to 200,000 viewers and 35,000 lottery ticket buyers. The Norwegian Federation of Organisations of Disabled People, which had cooperated with TV 2, saw little of its promised share of the lottery income. BingoLotto Norge as well as the Swedish people behind BingoLotto criticized Holden's performance. The show was stopped altogether in mid-1994.

== Second incarnation ==
In late 1996 an attempt was made to kickstart the show again, this time with the Norwegian Confederation of Sports as beneficiary organization. Hallvard Flatland first said no to become host, then yes the next month. However, the people behind BingoLotto struggled to find a channel to air the program, and to get the relevant concession from the Norwegian Ministry of Justice.

In August 1997 the concession application was declined. Turid Birkeland of Jagland's Cabinet was responsible, and the case thus became a part of the election campaigning for the Norwegian parliamentary election of 1997. Hallvard Flatland, who had lost his prospect of a job worth 4,000,000 kr (in wages), took part in the campaigning. As the election resulted in a cabinet change, the new Bondevik's First Cabinet promised to consider the application anew. The Confederation of Sports, however, backed out. An opposition party, the Conservative Party, brought the case to the Parliament of Norway, but the Standing Committee on Justice declined to support the application. When the case went on to the Parliament in session in December 1997, it was again rejected, against the votes of the Conservative and Progress Party. The majority voted to send the case back to the government. The government issued its final verdict in May 1998, again rejecting a concession.
