= Kvinna & man =

Studio album by Lotta Engberg, Jarl Carlsson
- Released: 23 February 2005
- Recorded: Sweden and the Czech Republic – 2003, 2005
- Genre: Folk songs, pop
- Length: 57:40
- Label: Mariann Grammofon AB
- Producer: Patrik Ehlersson and Leif Ottebrand

Lotta Engberg, Jarl Carlsson chronology
Fyra Bugg & en Coca Cola och andra hits (2003)	Kvinna & man (2005)	Världens bästa lotta (2006)

Kvinna & man was released on 23 February 2005 and is a studio album from Swedish singer Lotta Engberg, where she together with Jarl Carlsson sings love songs. The last track on the album, "Nära livets mening", was recorded by her in Prague in the Czech Republic in 2003, together with the symphony orchestra Czech National Symphony Orchestra, as she turned 40 years old.

== Track listing ==
#	Title	Songwriter	Length	Lead vocals
1.	"Kvinna & man"	Jarl Carlsson, Lars Granath	3:36	Lotta & Jarl
2.	"När kyrkklockor ringa"	Patrik Alm, Martha Johansson	3:15	Lotta
3.	"I folkviseton"	Nils Ferlin, Torgny Björk	2:36	Lotta & Jarl
4.	"Aldrig ska jag sluta älska dig"	Jesper Leisner, Jonas Gardell	3:07	Lotta
5.	"För kärlekens skull"	Ted Gärdestad, Kenneth Gärdestad	4:02	Lotta
6.	"Bara du"	Johan Landqvist, Lars Kronér	4:13	Jarl
7.	"Där björkarna susa"	Oskar Merikanto, Karl Sund	2:27	Lotta & Jarl
8.	"Barfotavals"	Lennart Carlberg	3:27	Jarl
9.	"I dag" ("I Swear")	Frank Myers, Gary Baker, Anica Olson	4:21	Lotta & Jarl
10.	"Ett liv för mig"	Anders Enderoth	3:22	Lotta
11.	"Sida vid sida"	Jarl Carlsson, Lars Granath	3:03	Jarl
12.	"Det vackraste"	Peter Grönwall, Nanne Grönwall, Maria Rådsten Ekman	3:23	Lotta
13.	"Vår sång"	Jarl Carlsson, Lars Granath	3:52	Lotta & Jarl
14.	"Ett litet ord"	Jarl Carlsson, Lars Granath	3:04	Jarl
15.	"Älska mig för den jag är"	Benny Andersson, Marie Nilsson	4:24	Lotta
16.	"Nära livets mening"	Mikael Wendt, Mikael Wendt	3:48	Lotta

== Contributing musicians ==
- Bow arrangement: Anders Lundqvist (5, 7, 15), Martin Schaub (3, 6, 8, 11)
- Choir arrangement: Lotta Engberg, Per Strandberg
- Vocals: Lotta Engberg, Jarl Carlsson
- Drums and percussion: Per Lindvall
- Bass: Tobias Gabrielsson
- Grand piano and organ: Peter Ljung
- Keyboards: Leif Ottebrand
- Guitar: Mats Johansson, Per Strandberg (10), Henric Cederblom (11)
- Saxophone, flute and oboe: Wojtek Goral
- Choir: Lotta Engberg, Per Strandberg, Magnus Bäcklund, Amanda & Malin Engberg
- Bow: (5, 7, 15) Åsa Stove Paulsson, Emilia Erlandsson, Susanne Magnusson
- Anders Andersson: Håkan Westlund, Amanda Sjönemo, Peter Gardemar
- Bow: (3, 6, 8, 11) Elin Stjärna, Tarik Lindström, Mats Lindberg, Thomas Lindström
- Synthesizer programming: Per Strandberg (12)
- Czech National Symphony Orchestra (16)
- Trumpet: Magnus Johsnsson (2, 7)
