= Kikki, Bettan & Lotta =

Swedish-Norwegian super trio

- Origin: Sweden / Norway
- Genres: Country / Dansband music / Pop / Schlager
- Instruments: Accordion (Kikki), Double bass (Bettan), Piano (Lotta)
- Years active: 2001-2004
- Label: Mariann Grammofon AB
- Members: Kikki Danielsson; Elisabeth Andreassen; Lotta Engberg

Kikki, Bettan & Lotta was a Swedish-Norwegian super trio, active 2001-2004 and consisting of Kikki Danielsson, Elisabeth "Bettan" Andreassen and Lotta Engberg.

== Career ==
In November 2000, Kikki Danielsson, Elisabeth "Bettan" Andreassen and Lotta Engberg sang together at the TV-aid En helg för världens barn, there they sang the song "Feels Like Home" which was the first time for all three as a group.

Kikki Danielsson and Elisabeth Andreassen had sung together in the band Chips in the early 1980s, when they won Melodifestivalen 1982 with Dag efter dag. On the other hand, Kikki had competed with Bettan at the Eurovision Song Contest 1985 when Kikki was representing Sweden, while Bettan representing Norway as a part of Bobbysocks won that year.

Kikki, Bettan & Lotta competed in the Swedish Melodifestivalen 2002, singing the song Vem é dé du vill ha (written by Thomas G:son), finishing third in the Swedish final on March 1, 2002.

On March 8, 2002 they released the album 20 år med oss - Vem é dé du vill ha.

The following year, the ladies entered the Norwegian Melodi Grand Prix 2003 with Din hånd i min hånd (music again by G:son, lyrics by Bettan), finishing fourth.

On July 9, 2002 the trio appeared in Allsång på Skansen and on July 14, 2002, they appeared in the celebration of Swedish crown princess Victoria's 25th birthday on Öland.

From 2002 to 2004 they toured Sweden with their own three-star show. In 2004, Kikki fell out for "personal reasons". Bettan and Lotta continued to tour for some time alone.

On 16 July 2012, all three artists temporary appeared at Allsång på Liseberg in Gothenburg.

== Melodifestivalen ==
- 2002: Vem é dé du vill ha (3rd place)

== Melodi Grand Prix ==
- 2003: Din hånd i min hånd (4th place)

== Discography ==
=== Albums ===
- 20 år med oss - Vem é dé du vill ha (2002)
- Live från Rondo (2003)

=== Singles ===
- Vem é dé du vill ha (2002)

== See also ==
In 2004, three other veteran Swedish singers, Ann-Louise Hanson, Towa Carson and Siw Malmkvist, formed a similar group called Hanson, Carlson & Malmkvist to enter Melodifestivalen 2004 with the song "C'est la vie", which also is a song by G:son.
