= Åh vad jag älskade dig just då =

Studio album by Lotta Engbergs
- Released: 16 February 1998
- Recorded: 1997–1998
- Genre: Dansband music
- Length: 47 minutes
- Label: Nordiska musikgruppen

Lotta Engbergs chronology
Tolv i topp (1997)	Åh vad jag älskade dig just då (1998)	Håll om mig nu (1998)

Åh vad jag älskade dig just då is a 1998 studio album from Swedish dansband Lotta Engbergs. The album reached the 22nd place on the Swedish album chart.

== Track listing ==
#	Title	Songwriter	Length
1.	"Om jag bara kunde"	Roland Andersson, Janet Jensen	?
2.	"Åh, vad jag älskade dig just då"	Bo Fransson, Kristina Morgärds	?
3.	"En plats i mitt hjärta"	Tony Westland, Camilla Andersson	?
4.	"Hatten av för farmor" ("Hatten af for farmor")	Carsten Warming, Hilda Heick, Keld Heick, Janet Jensen	?
5.	"Om du stannar kvar"	Henrik Sethsson, Jaana Sethsson	?
6.	""Ta mig med till världens ände" ("Ta mig med til verdens ende")	Søren Bundgaard, Keld Heick	?
7.	"Tre röda smultron"	Peter Bergqvist, Hans Backström	?
8.	"Var rädda om kärleken"	Elisabeth Lampert, Janett Jensen	?
9.	"Ta mig me'"	Thorleif Östmoe, Camilla Andersson	?
10.	"Du och jag"	Henrik Sethsson	?
11	"Vilken härlig morgon"	Martin Rahmberg, Carl Lösnitz	?
12.	"Mitt hjärta tillhör dig"	Tommy Kaså	?
13.	"Nånting´è på gång"	Thomas G:son, Tony Johansson	?
14.	"Jag vill vara din vän"	Pernilla Emme-Alexandersson	?
