= Erik Dammann =

Norwegian writer and environmentalist (1931–2025)

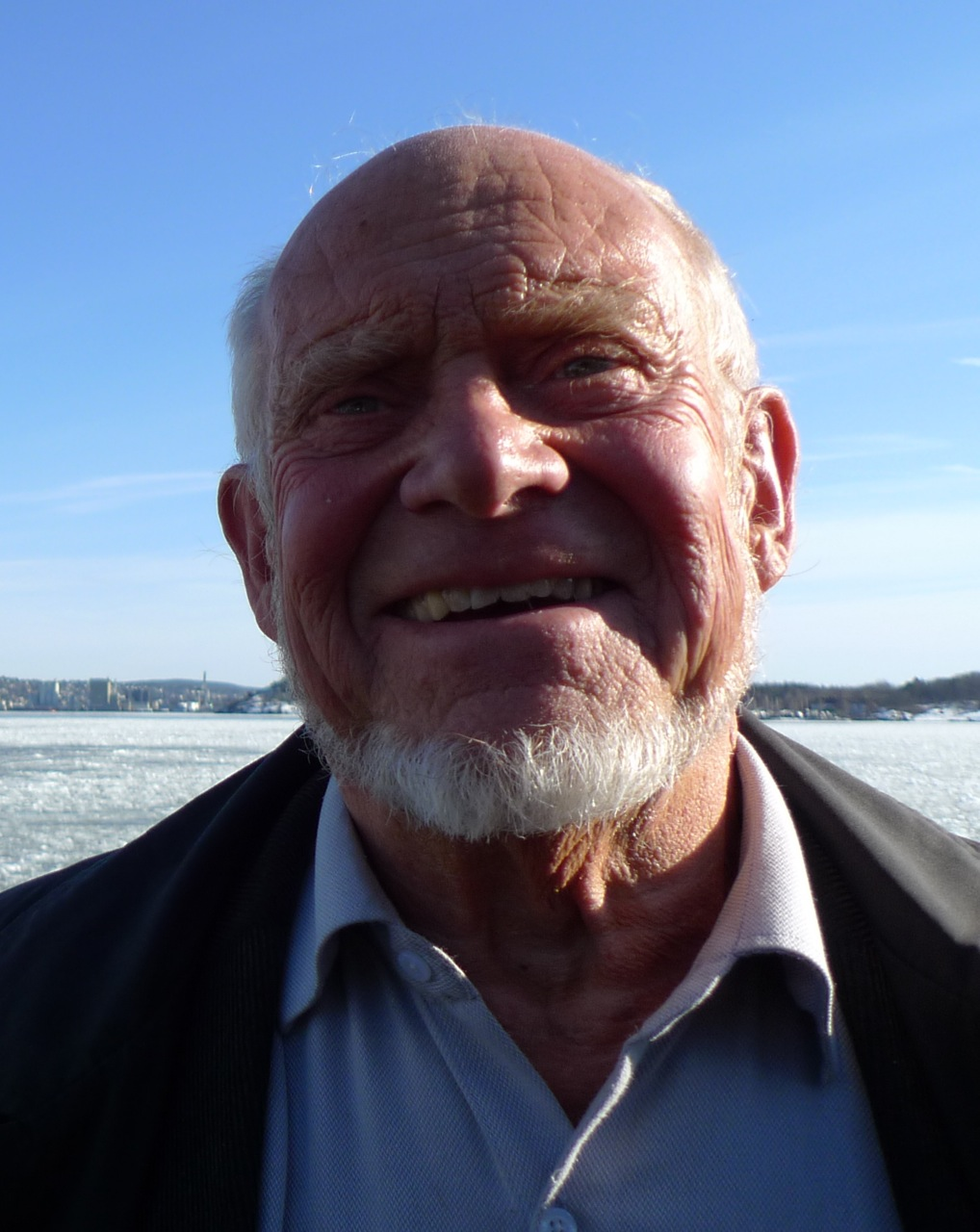
Dammann in 2011

Erik Dammann (9 May 1931 – 21 June 2025) was a Norwegian author, environmentalist and government scholar. He was mostly known for founding of the organization, The Future in Our Hands (Framtiden i våre hender). In 1982, he was awarded the Right Livelihood Award for "challenging Western values and lifestyles in order to promote a more responsible attitude to the environment and the third world". In 2011, he was knighted by the Royal Norwegian Order of Saint Olav.

== Life and career ==
Born in Oslo on 9 May 1931, Dammann was educated within advertising.

His book The Future in Our Hands raised social and environmental questions and put them in a much larger perspective than until then had been the norm. Inspired by the interest in this book in 1974, he initiated Framtiden i våre hender, today a worldwide organisation with thirty partner organisations over the globe. In 1978, the organization established The Development Fund (Utviklingsfondet). In 2003, The Development Fund established a youth-based affiliate, Spire.

Dammann was also known for his stay on the island of Samoa, described in the book With four children in a palm hut (1968), and also for starting the movement Project Alternative Future and Forum for System Debate. His book Behind time and space (1987) was described as the first introduction of New Age philosophy in Norway. In advertising in the early 70s, he contributed strongly to the introduction of the orange “S” as a square in the logo for Samvirkelaget.

In 1982, he received The Right Livelihood Award, "...for challenging Western values and lifestyles in order to promote a more responsible attitude to the environment and the third world." Beginning in 1988, Dammann was a recipient of a Lifetime Government grant. His books have been translated into nine languages.

Dammann was a long-time resident of Nesodden. He died on 21 June 2025, at the age of 94.

== Bibliography ==
- 1966: Truls and Tone the Magician, an adventure in reality
- 1968: With four children in a palm hut
- 1972: The Future in Our Hands
- 1972: Adoption?
- 1976: New lifestyle, and then what?
- 1977: The parties at separation point (with Jacob Bomann-Larsen)
- 1979: Revolution in the affluent society
- 1980: You decide!
- 1981: Free thoughts
- 1982: Talofa Samoa!
- 1987: Behind time and space
- 1989: Money or your life!
- 1998: Kidnapped (with Ragnhild Dammann)
- 2005: Contrasts, an account of a varied life (autobiography)
