= Development Fund (Norway) =

Nongovernmental organization, founded 1978

The Development Fund (Norwegian: Utviklingsfondet) is a Norwegian non-governmental organization (NGO) founded in 1978 by Norwegian author, Erik Dammann.

== Utviklingsfondet ==
Published in 1972, Dammann's book The Future in Our Hands raised social and environmental questions and put them in a much larger perspective than until then had been the norm. Inspired by the interest for this book, in 1974 he initiated Framtiden i våre hender (The Future in Our Hands), today a world wide organisation with thirty partner organisations over the globe. In 1978, that organization established The Development Fund (Utviklingsfondet).

Utviklingsfondet is an independent environment and development organization. The organization’s mission is “to contribute, with emphasis on long-term measures, to promoting a fairer distribution of the world’s resources, supporting sustainable development and local participation aimed at promoting democracy and human rights, reducing poverty and safeguarding the environment.” The Development Fund addresses in particular the challenges of small scale farmers in the South in advancing food security and make for sustainable agricultural practices when facing the effects of climate change. Through local partners in Asia (Nepal), Africa (Ethiopia, Malawi, Somalia, Mozambique) and Central America (Guatemala), The Development Fund works with different development and environment projects related to such as food security, pastoralists in dry-land areas, and agricultural biodiversity.

== Spire ==
Utviklingsfondet has a related youth group, Spire. Spire was established in 2003 and has local branches in Oslo, Ås, Bø, Stavanger, Trondheim, Tromsø, and Bergen. Spire works across party lines with global issues related to trade, development, environment, food and agriculture. Spire is an organization established for the purpose of working across party lines with global issues related to trade, climate and food. This youth group works on collaborative projects in Malawi.
