= Triple & Touch =

Swedish pop duo

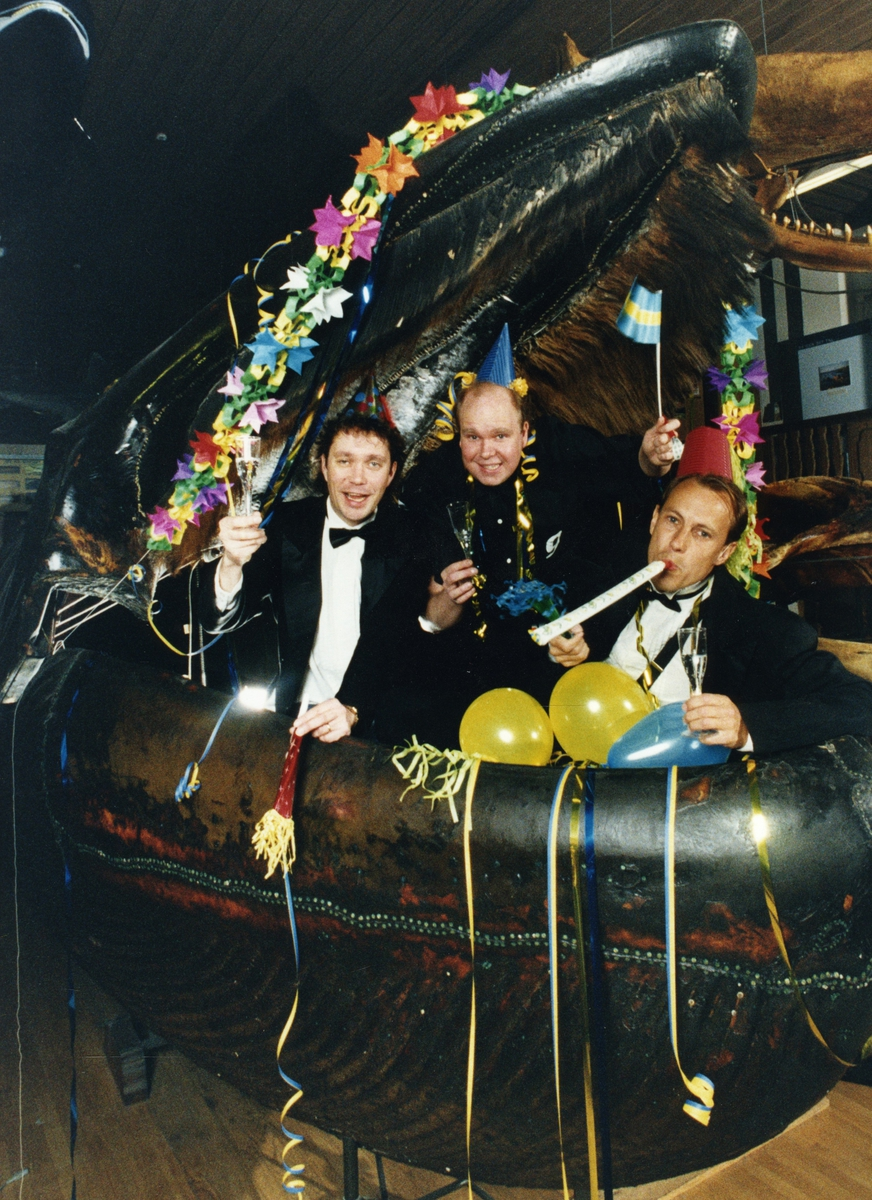
- Triple & Touch in 1992; from left to right: Göran Rudbo, Lasse Kronér and Ken Wennerholm

Background information
- Origin: Gothenburg, Sweden
- Genres: Pop; schlager
- Years active: 1983–present
- Members: Ken Wennerholm; Göran Rudbo
- Past members: Håkan Glänte; Lasse Kronér

Triple & Touch is a Swedish pop duo formed in Gothenburg in 1983. Earlier, Lasse Kronér (born 1962 in Gothenburg) was also a member until 1999, when he succeeded Leif Olsson for the leadership for the TV gameshow Bingolotto.

== History ==
=== 1980s ===
Featuring Swedish singer Lotta Engberg, Triple & Touch competed in the Swedish Eurovision Song Contest Melodifestivalen 1988 with the song "100%". The song won third place. It also peaked at number 13 on the Swedish singles chart. The trio sang in the choir for Swedish musician Björn Afzelius on his 1988 tour.

=== 1990s ===
During the 1990s, the group (with Lasse Kronér) led the TV show "Musikjägarna". Triple & Touch were the hosts of the Swedish Melodifestivalen 1993.

=== 2000s ===
In 2000, the duo Wennerholm and Rudbo led a summer entertainment from the park Trädgårdsföreningen in Gothenburg. During the season of the TV show På spåret 2005/2006 Rudbo/Wennerholm were members of the band.

In 2007, to help address the AIDS/HIV epidemic, the duo joined with South African rapper Prokid to release single "Aids-Free, That's Me".

== Personnel ==
- Ken Wennerholm – vocals (1983–present)
- Göran Rudbo – vocals (1983–present)
- Håkan Glänte – vocals (1983–1989)
- Lasse Kronér – vocals (1985–1999)

== Discography ==
- T&T (1993)
- 1000 gånger (1996)
- De 3 vise männen (1998)
- Duetter i stereo (2000)
