= BingoLotto (British game show) =

- Genre: Entertainment
- Created by: Gert Eklund
- Presented by: Joe Pasquale (Series 1), Suzanne Shaw (Series 1), Ulrika Jonsson (Series 2)
- Country of origin: United Kingdom
- Original language: English
- No. of seasons: 2
- No. of episodes: 6

Production
- Running time: 60 minutes (including adverts)

Original release
- Network: Virgin 1, Challenge
- Release: 29 February 2008 – 4 October 2009

Related
- Bingolotto

BingoLotto is a hybrid lottery-bingo style gameshow based on the Swedish show of the same name, Bingolotto. Each week, viewers with a valid gamecard had a 1 in 9.5 chance of winning. However, unlike the National Lottery, prizes would be life-enhancing, rather than life-changing. In other words, prizes were "small," varying from more game-cards to the maximum cash prize of £100,000. The game cards were printed in Sweden by "Idrottens Digital Print".

The show was promoted by IGS Television, as often mentioned in broadcasts.

== The Game ==
=== Card Spins ===
Every Game-card had a serial number unique to that card. During each show, numbers would spin on screen. If a person sitting at home could match their serial number to those on screen, they could call in an receive a prize. Prizes ranged from digital cameras to cars.

=== Bingo Games ===
There were 3 Bingo games that took place in BingoLotto. They corresponded with the red, yellow, and blue "cards" that were on each BingoLotto game-card. As numbers were read out on the show, players at home (and in the studio) would cross out corresponding numbers on the card. If a player got 4 corners or a straight line, they had a chance to call the studio and win a prize.

=== Cancellation ===
The company behind Bingolotto UK was reported to be in liquidation as of 8 October 2009. Employees were let go, and a year later, on Sunday 4 October 2009, ran the last BingoLotto game in the UK.

=== Music ===
Presentation elements of the main show were intertwined with various musical interludes including the acclaimed "Get me to the Church on time" theme.

== Beneficiaries ==
Like competing lotteries, Bingolotto donated some of its proceeds to charity. For example, at least 20% made from the sale of the £2 BingoLotto cards was donated to two charities: the CCPR and the NCVO.

=== CCPR ===
CCPR is the national alliance of governing and representative bodies of sport and recreation.

=== NCVO ===
The National Council for Voluntary Organisations (NCVO) is the umbrella body for the voluntary sector in England. NCVO works to support the voluntary sector and to create an environment in which voluntary organisations can flourish.

== Trivia ==
- The show's mascot was Mr. Bing, the bingo card, born at 7.07 pm on 7 July 1977. He weighed 7lb, 7oz.
- The show ran without commercial breaks.

== See also ==
- Bingolotto (Swedish version).
- National Lottery
- The Health Lottery
