= Succéschottis =

Song written and composed by Göran Arnberg and Magnus Fermin

Song by Lotta Engberg

from the album Fyra Bugg & en Coca Cola
- Language: Swedish
- Released: May 1987
- Genre: dansband music, schlager
- Label: Mariann
- Songwriters: Göran Arnberg, Magnus Fermin
- Composers: Göran Arnberg, Magnus Fermin

Succéschottis also known as Världens längsta schottis is a song written by Göran Arnberg and Magnus Fermin. It was originally recorded by For Meget Productions. Lyrically, the song is a joyful tune describing an international dance around the Earth, with references to various geographical locations, from Washington to Blekinge.

Lotta Engberg performed the song on her 1987 album Fyra Bugg & en Coca Cola, and her version was released to Svensktoppen, where it stayed for 10 weeks during the period 14 June–1 November 1987, peaking at third position.

Cowboybengts covered the song on their 2001, Grammis awarded album Vi är Cowboy Bengts. Lotta Engberg also appears on this version, with a sampled addition of her "Hej!" in the opening of her version of the song. The song has also been recorded in other languages, including a Norwegian take known as "Østerdalssvingom" with references to other geographical locations, which has been recorded by Norwegian dansband Scandinavia.
