= Lasse Kronér =

Swedish television presenter and musician

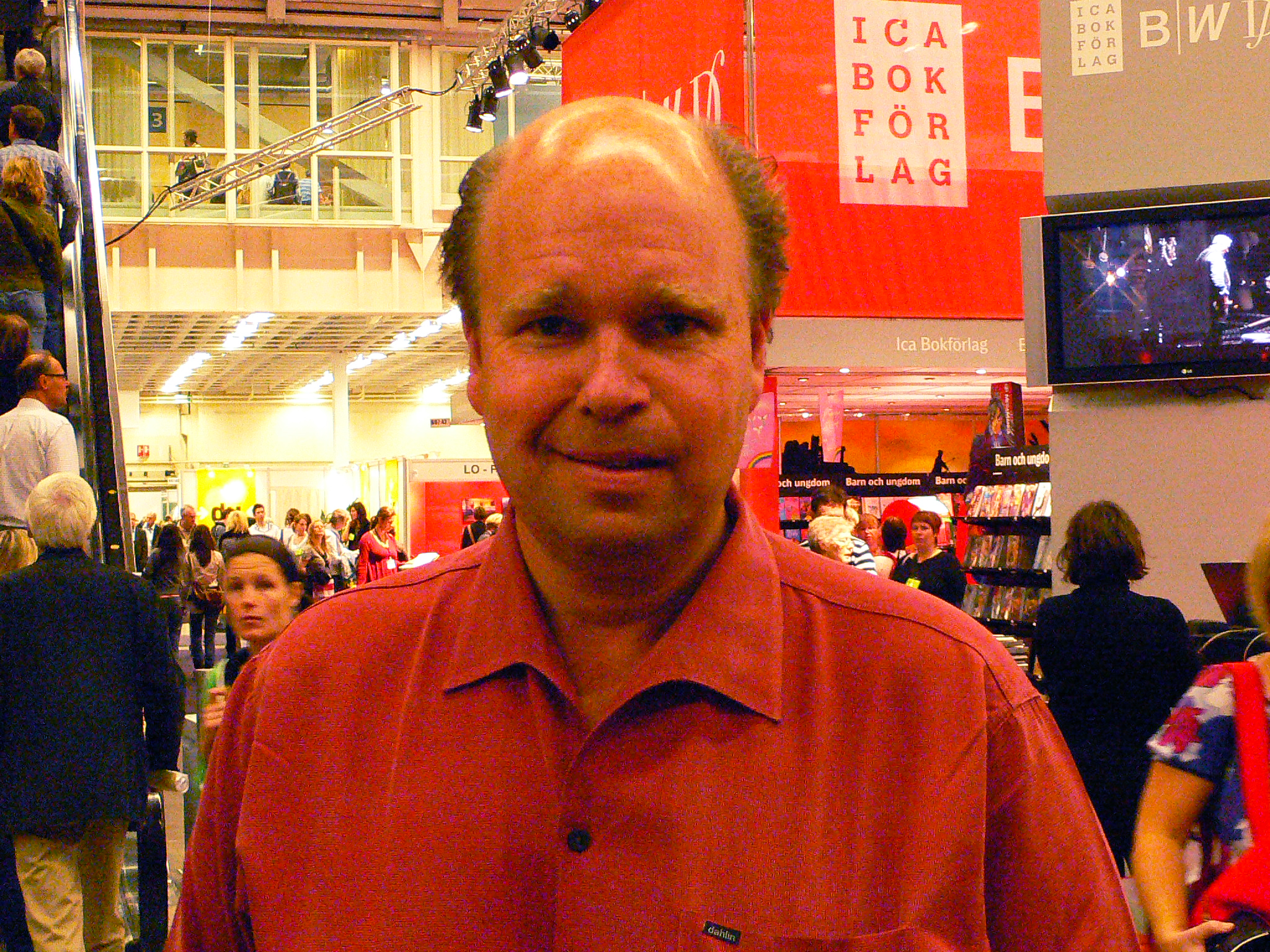
- Kronér in 2007
- Born: Lars Ove Kronér; 15 November 1962 (age 63); Gothenburg, Sweden
- Occupations: Musician, tv presenter
- Known for: A member of Triple & Touch; TV host of Bingolotto, Doobidoo, Zesam Lotto, Melodifestivalen 1993.

Lars Ove "Lasse" Kronér (born 15 November 1962) is a Swedish television presenter and musician, who resides in Onsala. Between 1985 and 1999 he became famous as a member of the music and show group Triple & Touch. Since then, he has mostly appeared as a presenter of various game shows on TV.

== Career ==
=== Music ===
Kronér first became known as one of the members of the group show Triple & Touch, where he was a member between 1985 and 1999. He participated in Melodifestivalen 1996, along with Peter Lundblad, Nick Borgen, Janne Bark and Lennart Grahn with the song "Gör någon glad", but they were knocked out after the first round. In 2000 he released his first solo album, with the title Lasse Kronér. The album has sold over 30,000 copies.

=== Television ===
In 1997, he appeared as the presenter of Zesam Lotto, Bingolotto's first live summer program on TV4. In 1999, he took over as host for the entire Bingolotto, after Leif "Loket" Olsson decided to leave the show, and ended up leading it until 2004.

In autumn 2005, he began to host a new program, the music quiz Doobidoo in Sveriges Television, a program for which he developed the idea Doobidoo has been ongoing since 2005, and, as of summer of 2012, had produced programs for the eighth season which aired on TV in autumn the same year.

In 2008, Kronér was SVT's yearly Christmas host on Christmas Eve. Since the spring of 2011, he is the TV presenter of the game show Smartare än en femteklassare, which is the Swedish version of the format Are You Smarter than a 5th Grader?. In 2011 he was a participant, along with Claes Malmberg, in the music game show Så ska det låta, where they competed against Jessica Andersson and Nanne Grönvall.

=== Other works ===
In 1996, he did the voice of the character Hugo in the Swedish language version of the Disney film The Hunchback of Notre Dame. In 2000, he released the board game Wall Street, which for some years were very successful. He also published a book of recipes for sandwiches in 2003, titled Åttio väldigt goda mackor (Eighty very tasty sandwiches).

== Discography ==
=== Studio albums ===
- 2001: Lasse Kronér (peaked at #13 on Sverigetopplistan)
- 2015: Nu (peaked at #40 on Sverigetopplistan)
