= En gång till (Lotta & Anders Engbergs orkester album) =

Studio album by Lotta & Anders Engbergs orkester
- Released: 1990
- Recorded: 1990
- Genre: Dansband music
- Length: 45 minutes
- Label: Doreme Records AB

Lotta & Anders Engbergs orkester chronology
| Genom vatten och eld (1989) | En gång till (1990) | Världens bästa servitris (1991) |

En gång till is a 1990 studio album from Swedish dansband Lotta & Anders Engbergs orkester.

== Track listing ==
| # | Title | Songwriter | Length |
|---|---|---|---|
| 1. | "Kärleken lever" | Lasse Westmann, Lennart Sjöholm | ? |
| 2. | "Ingen man är som han" | Mikael Wendt, Christer Lundh | ? |
| 3. | "True Love" | Cole Porter | ? |
| 4. | "Du är min egen Romeo" | Diana Thylin, Nigel Nuca, Christer Lundh | ? |
| 5. | "Ett café i Bordeaux" | Peter Åhs, Carl Lösnitz | ? |
| 6. | "Det känns alltid bra att va med dig" | Lasse Holm | ? |
| 7. | "Vår tid är nu" | Erik Lihm, Rita Saxmark | ? |
| 8. | "En gång till" | Mikael Wendt, Christer Lundh | ? |
| 9. | "Malaika" | Fadhili William-Mdawida, Ingela Forsman | ? |
| 10. | "Ingenting är bättre än det här" | Peter Åhs, Christer Lundh | ? |
| 11 | "Den bästa tiden i mitt liv" | Mikael Wendt, Christer Lundh | ? |
| 12. | "Can't Buy Me Love" ("instrumental") | John Lennon, Paul McCartney | ? |
| 13. | "Antonio" | Mikael Wendt, Christer Lundh | ? |
| 14. | "Då tänds lyktorna" | Peter Åhs, Carl Lösnitz | ? |
