= Norwegian Council for Mental Health =

Logo.

The Norwegian Council for Mental Health (Norwegian: Rådet for psykisk helse) is a humanitarian organisation in Norway.

It was established in 1985 to help people with mental problems. It has 29 member bodies, among others universities and other humanitarian organisations. It issues the magazine Psykisk helse. Chairman of the board is Tor Levin Hofgaard, and the organizational headquarters are in Oslo.
