= Leif "Loket" Olsson =

Swedish radio and television host (1942–2025)

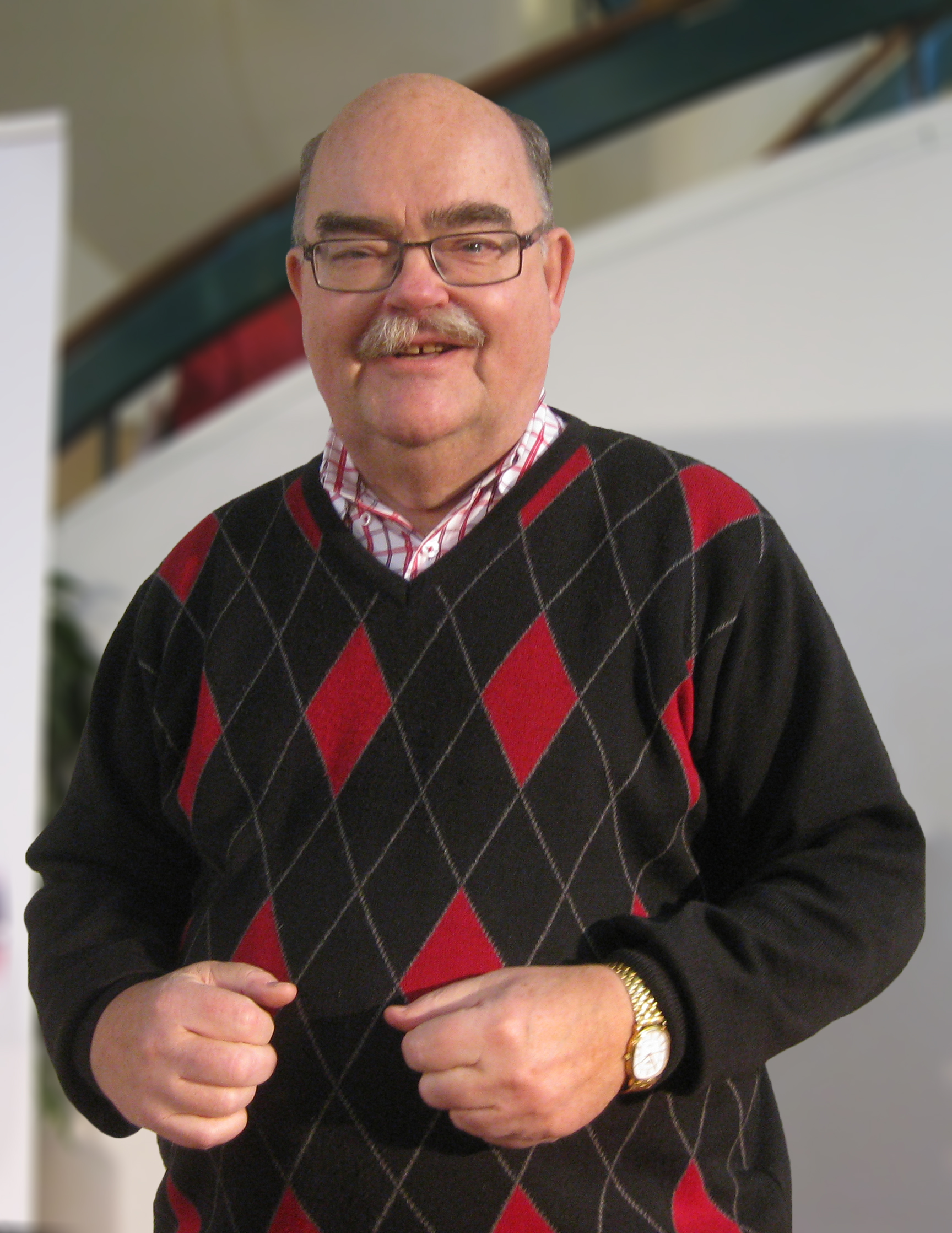
- Olsson in 2010
- Born: Leif Olsson; 12 July 1942; Gothenburg, Sweden
- Died: 30 January 2025 (aged 82); Gothenburg, Sweden
- Known for: Presenter of Bingolotto
- Honours: Gothenburger of the Year

Leif Oskar "Loket" Olsson (12 July 1942 – 30 January 2025) was a Swedish television presenter, sports journalist, radio host, and dansband singer. He is most recognised as the presenter of Bingolotto on TV4 between 1991 and 1999. Olsson got his breakthrough as the presenter of the radio programme Radio Ringlinjen which started in 1978. In 1992, Olsson was awarded the Lennart Hyland-Award as "most popular television personality of 1992" for his work on Bingolotto. Olsson was also known for presenting Svenska Idrottsgalan between 2000 and 2002, and also for the economy show Deklarera med Loket och Unni.

== Career ==
Olsson started his career as a handball referee in a career that included refereeing the handball semifinal between Yugoslavia and Romania at the 1972 Summer Olympics in Munich, Germany. Along with Hans Carlsson he also refereed the bronze medal match of the same tournament.

=== Radio Ringlinjen ===
Olsson got his breakthrough as the presenter of the radio programme Radio Ringlinjen which was broadcast on Friday night in the late 1970s to the early 1990s. The show was a success and was broadcast five nights a week. Olsson had a new topic for each show and let the listeners call in and tell their opinions about the topic. The show was broadcast on Sveriges Radio P1 between 1978 and 1991.

=== Bingolotto ===
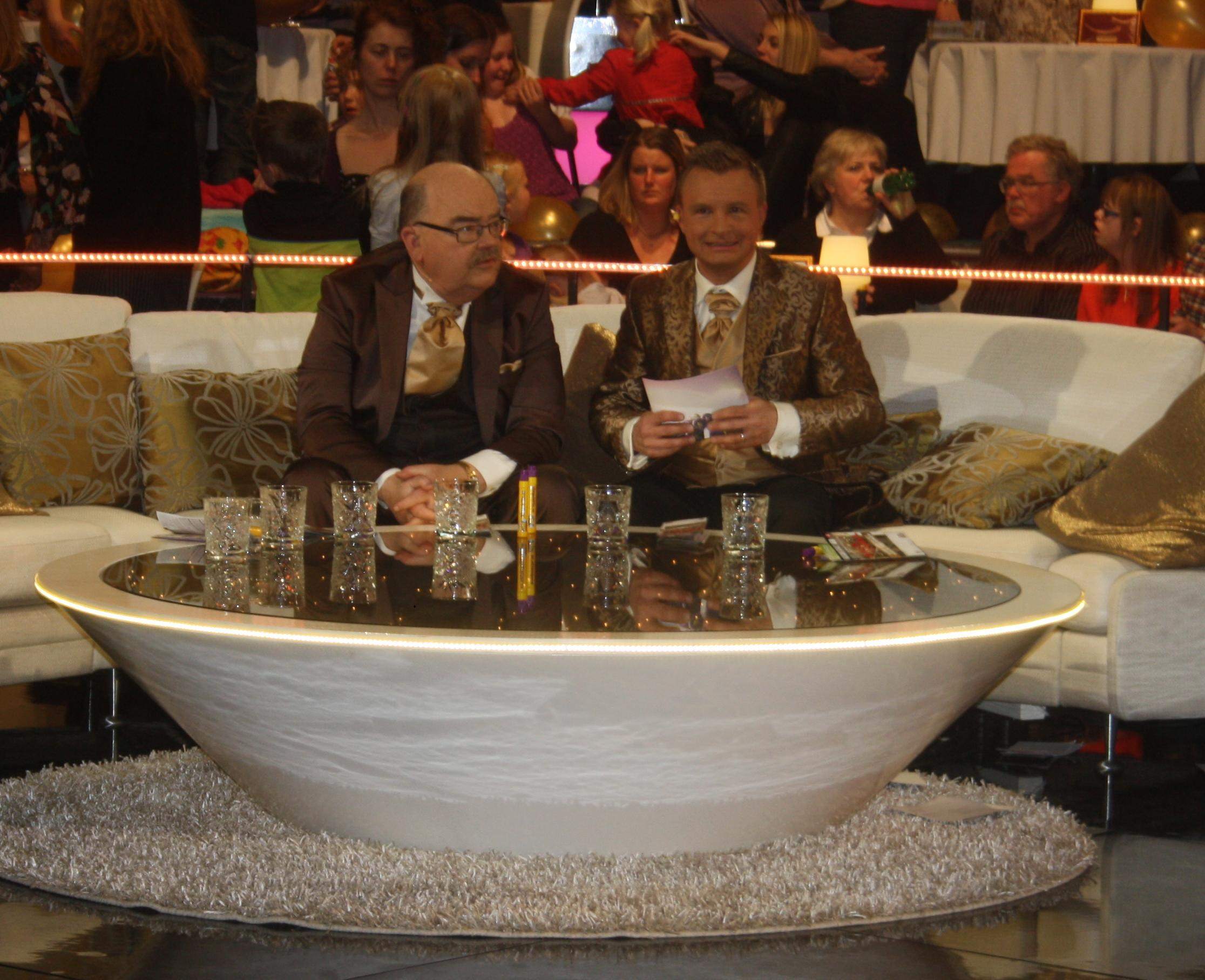
Olsson and Jan Bylund in the Bingolotto studio

Olsson is most popularly known for presenting Bingolotto, a lottery game show which he created and pitched for TV4. He presented the show from 1989 to 1999 after which Lasse Kronér took his role. Bingolotto became one of the most watched programmes on Swedish television in the 1990s. During the special Christmas broadcast of Bingolotto in 1995, it received 3,145 million viewers. The show's rating dropped in 1999 after Olsson quit the show. Olsson returned as a guest host in 2004 and 2011. Olsson was awarded the Lennart Hyland-Award as "most popular television personality of 1992" for his work on Bingolotto.

=== Other television and film appearances ===
After Bingolotto, Olsson presented Svenska Idrottsgalan (Swedish Sports Awards) on SVT during a three-year period between 2000 and 2002 along with Kristin Kaspersen. In 2002, Olsson presented Deklarera med Loket och Unni (Economy with Loket and Unni) on TV4.

Olsson also made a cameo-appearance in the soap opera Tre kronor on TV4. Olsson appeared as himself in several Swedish films, including Yrrol – en kolossalt genomtänkt film in 1994 and En på miljonen in 1995. He can be seen briefly, in footage from Bingolotto, in the music video for "Ray of Light" by Madonna.

=== Music ===
Olsson was also a dansband singer and released several albums in the 1990s. His most sold music recordings were the dansband record Lokets favoriter and the single "Vart tog jultomten vägen?" ("Where Did Santa Claus go?"), which sold 250,000 copies.

== Death ==
Olsson died in Gothenburg on 30 January 2025, at the age of 82. Hours after the announcement of his death, Sweden's Prime Minister Ulf Kristersson made a statement that Loket "was a big personality" and that "we are thinking about him today".
