= Norwegian Association of the Blind =

Norwegian visual disability advocacy group

The Norwegian Association of the Blind (Norwegian: Norges Blindeforbund) is the advocacy group for the blind and visually impaired in Norway. It is Norway's oldest association of the disabled.

It has ca. 11,000 members as of 2015. Its headquarters is in Oslo, with regional offices in each county. Its general secretary has been Arnt Holte since January 1, 2016.

It publishes its own magazine Norges Blinde (English: "The Blind of Norway"), as well as Alt om syn (English: "All about sight") for external information.

== Activities ==
Alongside advocacy, the Norwegian Association of the Blind also carries out charitable work and services, partially through government funds. It owns and runs several events for the visually impaired, and carries out various rehabilitation and well-being activities for all ages.

In Malawi the Norwegian Association of the Blind supports the Malawi Union of the Blind (MUB).

== History ==
It was founded in 1909 by Nordenfjeldske Blindeforbund (English: "Northern Mountains' Association of the Blind")—in turn founded in 1900 as De Blindes Selvhjælperforening (English: "Self-help Association of the Blind")— as well as Vestlandske Blindeforbund (English: "Association of the Blind of Western Norway"; f. 1904) and Østlandske Blindeforbund (English: "Association of the Blind of Eastern Norway"; f. 1907).

It was in 1975 reformed with county-based groups as its fundamental components; at this point the Association of the Blind of Western Norway broke out of the organization. Both re-merged January 1, 2008.

The Norwegian Association of the Blind has been selected as a cause for the Norwegian TV campaign three times, in 1976, 1981 and 1991—although the two latest campaigns has been run in conjunction with other associations.
