= Jörgen Andersson =

Swedish actor, dramaturge and pedagog

Jörgen Andersson (born 14 September 1951) is a Swedish actor, dramaturge and pedagog. He was born and raised in Önnestad, Sweden. He was admitted to the Malmö Theatre Academy in 1980, and has had both stage and screen roles. He later worked as a teacher.

== Selected filmography ==
- 1997 - Beck – Mannen med ikonerna
- 1987 - Lackalänga (TV)
- 1985 - Åshöjdens BK (TV)
- 1978 - Grabbarna i 57:an (TV)
