= Genom vatten och eld =

Studio album by Lotta & Anders Engbergs orkester
- Released: May 1989
- Recorded: Nordic Sound Lab Studios, Skara, Sweden, January–March 1989
- Genre: Dansband music
- Length: 42 minutes
- Label: Big Bag (CD); Doreme (LP, MK)

Lotta & Anders Engbergs orkester chronology
Genom vatten och eld (1989)	En gång till (1990)

Genom vatten och eld is a studio album from Swedish dansband Lotta & Anders Engbergs orkester, released in 1989. The album peaked at #48 at the Swedish album charts.

== Track listing ==
#	Title	Songwriter	Length
1.	"Genom vatten och eld"	Torgny Söderberg	?
2.	"Skön Cecilia"	traditional, arrangement Anders Engberg, Michael Wendt	?
3.	"Nyfiken"	Mikael Wendt, Christer Lundh	?
4.	"Så många barn"	Peter Åhs, Christer Lundh	?
5.	"På min sommaräng" ("My Boy Lollipop")	Morris Levy, Robert Spencer, Johnny Roberts, Christer Lundh	?
6.	"Bara du"	Mikael Wendt, Christer Lundh	?
7.	"All My Loving"	John Lennon, Paul McCartney	?
8.	"Melodin"	Torgny Söderberg, Monica Forsberg	?
9.	"20-30-45"	Anders Melander	?
10.	"Bonn-Pärs bröllop"	Peter Åhs, Christer Lundh	?
11	"En kärlekssång till dej"	Py Bäckman, Dan Hylander	?
12.	"Om du säger som det är"	Lasse Holm	?
13.	"Zambesi River"	Nico Carstens, Anton de Waal	?
14.	"Eldröda rosor"	Lasse Westmann, Lennart Sjöholm	?

== Charts ==
Chart (1989)	Peak position
Sweden (Sverigetopplistan)	48
