= Tor Levin Hofgaard =

Tor Levin Hofgaard (born 26 March 1968). He is now the chief psychologist in the insurance company Euro Accident.

He was president of the Norwegian Psychological Association from 2007-2019. He has been vice-president of International Union of Psychological Science and an Executive Council member in the European Federation of Psychologists' Associations. In Norway he was chair of the board in Norwegian Council for Mental Health for 12 years, and a member of the board in Federation of Norwegian Professional Associations.

Norwegian psychological association
Hofgaard was elected president first time in 2007, and has since been re-elected three times.

In his time as president he has made four main elements his priority:

- Psychology serving society
- Easy access to psychologists in primary care
- Openness and debate
- Professionalizaton of the associations work

International Union of Psychological Science

Hofgaard as elected as vice-president in 2012 for a period of four years. His focus in the union is on:

- capacity building
- policy
- strategy.

European Federation of Psychologists' Associations

Hofgaard was elected as Executive Council member in 2011 for a period of four years. He has special responsibility for the area of community psychology and prevention and intervention. His second term ended in 2019.

Norwegian Council for Mental Health

Hofgaard was elected chair of the board in 2011.

Federation of Norwegian Professional Associations

He was elected member of the board in 2010.

Clinical work

Hofgaard has been working especially with long term severe drug addiction and with early intervention for psychosis, as well as with acute ward patients and with patients in outpatient clinics. He has also had a private practice working especially with LGBT related subjects, including patients with HIV.

Hofgaard also has a university education in political science. Before starting his psychological degree he had an officer's education, and worked in the Royal Norwegian Navy.
