= Bingolotto =

1989 Swedish TV show

- Opening sequence
- Created by: Gert Eklund
- Starring: Leif "Loket" Olsson (1989-1999, 2004); Lasse Kronér (1999-2004); Gunde Svan (2004-2005); Rickard Olsson (2005-2008, 2018-); Lotta Engberg (2008-2011) (2017-2018) (2020-); Jan Bylund (2011-2013); Marie Serneholt (2013-2014); Ingvar Oldsberg (2014-2017); Agneta Sjödin (2017-2018); Stefan Odelberg (2020-)
- Country of origin: Sweden
- No. of episodes: 1077

Production
- Running time: 100 minutes (since 2014)
- Production company: Eyeworks

Original release
- Network: Kållevisionen/TV21 (1989-2000); TV4 (1991-); TV4 Plus (2008-2011); Sjuan (2011-2015)
- Release: 16 January 1989

Bingolotto is a Swedish primetime television lottery game show that was first broadcast 1989 on local TV and since 1991 nationwide on the Swedish network TV4. The show is a collaboration work between Swedish TV channel TV4, the Swedish lottery game company Folkspel and the Swedish sports life. The show premiered on 16 January 1989 on the local TV channel Kållevisionen with the highly popular Leif "Loket" Olsson as show host. Since the beginning, the show has given 16 billion Swedish krona to the Swedish sports life centre.

== History ==
In January 1989, Bingolotto premiered in Gothenburg, introduced by Leif "Loket" Olsson. The programme became popular in this area and 10,000 lottery tickets were sold to every episode between 1989 and 1991. In the autumn of 1990, the game show's owner and C.E.O. Gert Eklund started his collaboration with TV4 to start broadcasting the show nationwide. Olsson, who had built the game and company together with Eklund in 1988, owned a 25 percent share of the game but was bought out in 1999.

On 19 October 1991, Bingolotto premiered nationwide on TV4, still hosted by Olsson. The premiere episode was watched by 1.3 million viewers in Sweden, a surprisingly high viewing figure. From October 1991 to March 1992, Bingolotto's viewing figures rose from 1.3 million viewers to 2.1 million. The success of the show was positively associated with the popularity of host Leif "Loket" Olsson.

In 1992, Olsson received the television award The Lennart Hyland TV Prize for Best Male Show Host of the Year. Loket received this prize again in 1994 and 1997. In 1993, Loket received the prize "Årets Göteborgare" (Gothenburg Citizen of the Year).

In 1994, Olsson attracted 3.5 million viewers to watch every single program throughout the whole year, a record-high viewing figure. In 1995, Olsson attracted 4.5 million viewers to every programme, the highest viewing figure that has been registered in Swedish TV.

In 1999, Olsson left the show and was replaced by Lasse Kronér. The viewing figure immediately crashed to only 900,000 viewers per programme, and a number of viewers and fans of the show wanted "Loket" to return. In January 2004, Kronér was fired and Olsson was asked to return briefly.

The price of the lottery ticket has been between 25 and 50 Swedish kronor, and in March 2005, one billion tickets had been sold since the beginning. The surplus is given to Swedish sport associations, a fact which is commonly believed to have increased the penetration of the show. 31.5 million Swedish kronor (approx £2.5 million) is the highest ever prize in the history of Bingolotto, won by a woman from Vara.

After Olsson's second retirement from the show in 2004, it was hosted by entertainer and musician Lars Kronér, skiing athlete Gunde Svan, and TV-personality Rickard Olsson, none of whom were able to maintain the show's earlier popularity. A significant rise in popularity developed when the singer Lotta Engberg took over the hosting in autumn 2008. From autumn 2011 the show was hosted by Jan Bylund. In 2008 the program moved from TV4 to TV4 Plus; on 12 September 2011 the channel name was changed to Sjuan (The Seven). In August 2015 the program moved back to TV4 with Ingvar Oldsberg as host.

Clips from Bingolotto are featured in the video of Madonna's 1998 song "Ray of Light", directed by Swede Jonas Åkerlund. and in the 1998 film Show Me Love. In both cases clips from the period when Leif "Loket" Olsson hosted the show were used.

A UK version was also produced, see BingoLotto (UK). Both TV programs have had as media consultant professor Charlie Medina.

In 2023, Spelinspektionen received multiple tips that an underage bettor was able to bet on the December 23rd show, and sanctioned Folkspel in June 2024. Spelinspektionen alleges that there were no technical requirements to ensure underage punters could not access the game when calling in.

== Music ==
The programmes contains music pauses, where an artist or group appears. During the Leif "Loket" Olsson leadership era, Bingolotto was strongly dominated by dansband music. Later, other popular music also has become more common.

In the 2000s, many international superstars performed on the show, including Anastacia, Andrea Bocelli, David Bowie, Michael Bublé, Chicago, Phil Collins, Céline Dion, Elton John, Bon Jovi, Def Leppard, Dolly Parton, Deep Purple, Lionel Richie, Rod Stewart, Shania Twain and Robbie Williams.

== See also ==
- BingoLotto (Norway), the Norwegian version
- BingoLotto (UK), the British version broadcast in 2008–2009
