= Världens bästa servitris =

Studio album by Lotta & Anders Engbergs Orkester
- Released: 1991
- Recorded: 1990–1991
- Genre: Dansband music
- Length: 49 minutes
- Label: Doreme Records AB

Lotta & Anders Engbergs Orkester chronology
En gång till (1990)	Världens bästa servitris (1991)	Stora rubriker (1992)

Världens bästa servitris is a 1991 studio album from Swedish dansband Lotta & Anders Engbergs Orkester.

== Track listing ==
=== Side A ===
#	Title	Songwriter	Length
1.	Världens bästa servitris	Mikael Wendt, Christer Lundh	?
2.	Tusen vackra bilder	Mikael Wendt, Christer Lundh	?
3.	Ge mig en chans ("How Do You Do It?")	Mitch Murray, Mikael Wendt, Christer Lundh	?
4.	Du ger mig ljuset varje morgon ("Hvor jeg dog elsker denne morgen")	Ole Bredahl, Bente Frithioff Kawa, Mikael Wendt, Christer Lundh	?
5.	Ingen annan än du (vocals by Peter Åhs)	Peter Åhs, Carl Lösnitz	?
6.	Min gamla jukebox (Mr. Duke)	Søren Bundgaard, Keld Heick, Mikael Wendt, Christer Lundh	?
7.	Lassie	Benny Andersson, Marie Nilsson	?

=== Side B ===
#	Title	Songwriter	Length
8.	Rosa på bal (Fritiof och lilla jag) (duet Lotta Engberg-Christer Sjögren)	Evert Taube	?
9.	Vem är den flickan?	Mikael Wendt, Christer Lundh	?
10.	Jag vill sjunga ut min glädje (Tenk så bra)	Frank Wisur, Hanne Sommernes, Mikael Wendt, Christer Lundh	?
11.	Put Your Head on My Shoulder (duet Lotta Engberg-Peter Åhs)	Paul Anka	?
12.	Yakety Sax (instrumental)	Boots Randolph, James Rich	?
13.	Då, när vi rör vid varann	Mikael Wendt, Christer Lundh, Carl Lösnitz	?
14.	Minns du än (vocals by Peter Åhs)	Peter Åhs, Carl Lösnitz	?
15.	Ett skratt förlänger livet	Fredrik Strelvik, Marie Strelvik	?
