= BigAirBAG =

Dutch sports equipment manufacturer

- Founded: 2004; 22 years ago
- Headquarters: Netherlands

BigAirBAG is a Dutch sports equipment manufacturer which produces a large, inflatable cushion. The company's product, also called BigAirBAG (BAB), is intended to soften and secure the impact from landing tricks as part of a variety of extreme sports including snowboarding, skiing, BMX, mountain biking, mountain boarding and indoor climbing.

== History ==
The company was established in 2004 by Dutch snowboarders who wanted to improve their technical skills with reduced risk of injuries. The BigAirBAG first gained popularity in the indoor parks throughout the Netherlands (SnowPlanet, SnowWorld). Within two years, a number of resorts in Europe and internationally had deployed BigAirBAGs.

== Product ==
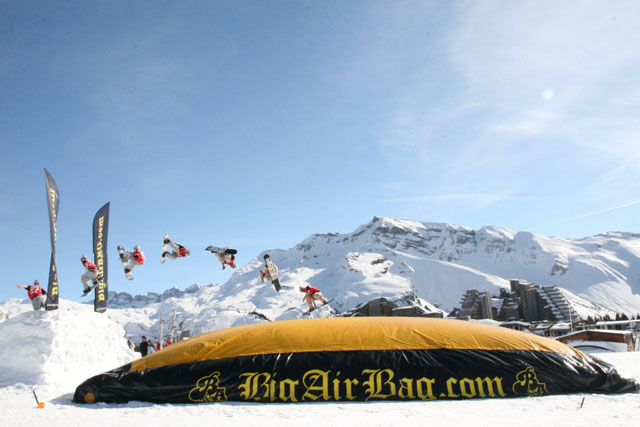

The BigAirBAG is built upon the 'fall cushion' concept used in professional stunts. The BAB incorporates two nylon air 'pillows': the lower one is firm, ensuring stability while the upper one is soft, enabling smoothness of the fall. Two electrical blowers are placed in the sides of the bag to keep it inflated while it is being used. It is normally placed below the kicker (in run) of a jump and when a rider lands on it, the holes in the upper layer let air out thus absorbing the fall. The BAB has additional layers on the top ('impact deck') and on the sides to protect the cushions from damage. BABs are produced in several sizes.

== Locations ==
In Europe, the BigAirBAG is used in 44 resort parks, in countries such as Switzerland, Italy, France, Austria, Turkey, Norway, Finland, Bulgaria, Spain, etc. Globally, BigAirBAG is used in Dubai, Lebanon, Chile, New Zealand, Iran, etc. It is in partnership with Danish social network My Snowparks enabling users to map the resorts, share information about the parks, the weather conditions, etc. The BigAirBAG has been employed as part of the Swatch summer and winter parks.

== Events ==
The BigAirBAG regularly supports events in the Netherlands and worldwide including events and free style camps in Spaarnwoude, Den Bosch, Utrecht, Norway (Tacky Invitational Hafjell ), Andorra, Italy, etc. In 2006 BigAirBAG provided the support for the professional snowboarders competing for the world's record in airtime in David Benedek’s Red Bull Gap Session.
