= Fyra Bugg & en Coca Cola =

1987 Lotta Engberg album

Studio album by Lotta Engberg
- Released: 13 April 1987
- Genre: Pop
- Length: 39:46
- Label: Mariann
- Producer: Anders Engberg

Lotta Engberg chronology
Fyra Bugg & en Coca Cola (1987)	100% (1988)

Singles from Fyra Bugg & en Coca Cola
- 1. "Boogaloo" Released: May 1987

Fyra Bugg & en Coca Cola, also known as 4 Bugg & en Coca Cola, is the debut studio album by the Swedish singer Lotta Engberg, released on 13 April 1987 by Mariann Grammofon.

It was rereleased to CD in 1992.

== Track listing ==
Side one
No.	Title	Writer(s)	Length
1.	"Boogaloo"	Mikael Wendt, Christer Lundh	2:54
2.	"Orientexpressen"	Christer Lundh, Göran Arnberg, Magnus Fermin	2:58
3.	"Jag vandrar i ett regn"	Mikael Wendt, Christer Lundh, Anders Engberg	3:34
4.	"Hey Hey Lady Lay"	Christer Lundh, Håkan Almqvist, Bobby Ljunggren	3:06
5.	"Vi kan drömma"	Christer Lundh, Göran Arnberg, Magnus Fermin	4:09
6.	"Dom vill bara väl"	Christer Lundh, Göran Arnberg, Magnus Fermin	3:28
Total length:			20:09

Side two
No.	Title	Writer(s)	Length
1.	"Succéschottis"	Göran Arnberg, Magnus Fermin	3:23
2.	"Brevet från Maria på Öland"	Christer Lundh, Maria Olsson, Thore Skogman	3:12
3.	"Jag vill bara va' en människa av idag"	Rolf Lövland, Örjan Englund, Ulf Westman	3:10
4.	"Nicolaj"	Torgny Söderberg, Ingela Forsman	4:10
5.	"Håll om mej i natt (Together We Can Make this Wrong World Right)"	Christer Lundh, Peter Right Steyne	3:14
6.	"Ditt monopol"	Christer Lundh, Anders Engberg	2:28
Total length:			19:37

== Charts ==
Chart (1987)	Peak position
Swedish Albums (Sverigetopplistan)	27
