= Framtiden i våre hender =

Norwegian environmental organization

Framtiden i våre hender is an idealistic organization in Norway that advocates green consumption and resource justice. The Norwegian name literally translates to The Future in Our Hands.

The organization is critical of the ever-increasing consumption in rich countries such as Norway, and believes that consideration for nature and climate is more important than growth in consumption and economy. The organization was inspired and founded by Erik Dammann in 1974, and is currently led by Anja Bakken Riise.

As of 2020, the Future is in our hands is Norway's largest environmental organization with more than 35,000 members.

Arild Hermstad sat as leader until 2017. He was replaced by Anja Bakken Riise, who is the organisation's current leader.

== Core causes ==
The organization prioritizes three causes in particular:

1) Fair pay for those who make the products we use in everyday life - such as clothing, food and mobile phones - especially in poor countries.

2) Reduced meat consumption and production: for the sake of environment, public health, and animal welfare.

3) Fossil fuel divestment: shifting investment from the coal, oil and gas industry to renewable energy.
