= Boogaloo (song) =

1987 Lotta Engberg song

"Fyra Bugg och en Coca Cola"

Single by Lotta Engberg

from the album Fyra Bugg & en Coca Cola
- Language: Swedish
- B-side: "En helt ny dag"
- Released: May 1987
- Label: Mariann Grammofon
- Composer: Mikael Wendt
- Lyricist: Christer Lundh

Lotta Engberg singles chronology
"Fyra Bugg och en Coca Cola" (1987)	"Orientexpressen" (1987)

Eurovision Song Contest 1987 entry
- Country: Sweden
- Artist: Lotta Engberg
- Language: Swedish
- Composer: Mikael Wendt
- Lyricist: Christer Lundh
- Conductor: Curt-Eric Holmquist

Finals performance
- Final result: 12th
- Final points: 50

Entry chronology
- ◄ "E' de' det här du kallar kärlek?" (1986)
- "Stad i ljus" (1988) ►

"Boogaloo", also known by its original title "Fyra Bugg och en Coca Cola" ("Four Buggs and a Coca-Cola"), is a Swedish-language song. written by Mikael Wendt and Christer Lundh, with which Swedish dansband and pop singer Lotta Engberg won the Melodifestivalen 1987.

The song, which is about summer, was renamed "Boogaloo" for the Eurovision Song Contest 1987, where it represented Sweden. It is the title track of Engberg's 1987 album, Fyra Bugg & en Coca Cola.

The single was released in May 1987, with the song "En helt ny dag" as the B-side. It peaked at number 19 on the Swedish Singles Chart. Additionally, the song charted at Svensktoppen for six weeks between 19 April and 24 May 1987, topping the chart all six times.

== Charts ==
Chart (1987)	Peak position
Sweden (Sverigetopplistan)	19
Sweden (Svensktoppen)	1

== In popular culture ==
- A Swedish television clip from 1987 featured future prime minister Carl Bildt doing sing-along to "Fyra bugg och en Coca Cola" when he visited a music studio. Bildt, who was wearing headphones, was distinctly off-key in his singing performance, and this clip has been used several times by comedy shows on Swedish television.
- In the Melodifestivalen 2010, Timo Räisänen performed the song.

Preceded by E' de' det här du kallar kärlek? by Lasse Holm and Monica Törnell	Melodifestivalen winners 1987	Succeeded by Stad i ljus by Tommy Körberg
