= Norwegian Federation of Organisations of Disabled People =

Logo

The Norwegian Federation of Organisations of Disabled People (Norwegian: Funksjonshemmedes Fellesorganisasjon, FFO) is an umbrella organization for interest organizations of disabled people in Norway.

It was founded on 21 September 1950. Originally named Landsnemnda av de delvis arbeidsføres organisasjoner, its current name dates from 1974.
