= 100% (Lotta Engberg and Triple & Touch song) =

1988 single by Lotta Engberg and Triple & Touch

Single by Lotta Engberg and Triple & Touch

from the album 100%
- Language: Swedish
- B-side: "Lång natt mot gryning"
- Released: 1988
- Genre: Schlager
- Length: 2:55
- Label: Big Bag
- Songwriters: Torgny Söderberg; Monica Forsberg
- Producers: Anders Engberg; Torgny Söderberg

Lotta Engberg singles chronology
"Fyra Bugg & en Coca Cola" (1987)	"100%" (1988)	"Ringar på vatten" (1988)

Triple & Touch singles chronology
"100%" (1988)	"Pata-pata" (1989)

Audio
- "100%" on YouTube

"100%" is a Swedish language song, written by Torgny Söderberg and Monica Forsberg. The song was sung by Lotta Engberg of the group Triple & Touch at the Swedish Melodifestivalen 1988, where it finished third with 47 points. The song text describes the days as a roller coaster, but it's also about love.

In 1988, the songs 100% and Lång natt mot gryning from the album 100% were also released on a single record, peaking at #13 at the Swedish singles chart.

The song was tested at Svensktoppen, where it stayed for 10 weeks during the time April 3-June 5, 1988. It charted at number one during the first two weeks.

== Cover versions ==
- In 1988, the Swedish dansband Vikingarna covered the song.
- In 1989, Finnish singer Ritva Elomaa recorded a Finnish language cover version named Täydellinen onni.
- Danish singer Birthe Kjær has recorded the song with lyrics in Danish.

== Track listing and formats ==
- Swedish 7-inch single

A. "100%" – 2:55
B. "Lång natt mot gryning" – 3:15

== Charts ==
Weekly chart performance for "100%"
Chart (1988)	Peak position
Sweden (Sverigetopplistan)	13
