= En gång till (song) =

Single by Lotta & Anders Engbergs orkester

from the album En gång till
- A-side: "En gång till"
- B-side: "Bara du"
- Released: 1990
- Genre: Dansband music Schlager
- Label: Doreme
- Songwriters: Christer Lundh; Mikael Wendt

"En gång till" ("one more time"), written by Christer Lundh and Mikael Wendt, is the song that Swedish dansband singer Lotta Engberg performed when it competed in the Swedish Melodifestivalen 1990, where it finished 8th. In 1990, Lotta & Anders Engbergs Orkester released the single En gång till, with the song Bara du as B-side.

The song charted at Svensktoppen for two weeks during the period 8–15 April 1990, with a 7th and an 8th place as best result there.

== Cover versions ==
Danish singer Birthe Kjær covered the song in a Danish as En gang til, with lyrics by Dan Adamsen, on her 1993 album Jeg ka' ikke la' vær'.
