= Vem é dé du vill ha =

Single by Kikki, Bettan & Lotta

from the album 20 år med oss
- A-side: "Vem é dé du vill ha"
- B-side: "Vem é dé du vill ha" (instrumental version)
- Released: 2002
- Genre: Schlager
- Label: Mariann
- Songwriters: Thomas Gustafsson; Calle Kindbom

Vem é dé du vill ha ("Who is it you want") is a pop song in Swedish, written by Thomas G:son and Calle Kindbom. With the song, Kikki, Bettan & Lotta competed in the Swedish Melodifestivalen 2002, where the song finished 3rd. The song is an old style and joyful "schlager" and is about love.

In 2002, "Vem é dé du vill ha" was also released on a single record, peaking at #32 at the Swedish singles chart. Between 23 March and 11 May 2002 the song was also listed in the Swedish radio show "Svensktoppen", peaking at #2 there.

The song was released to the Kikki, Bettan & Lotta album "20 år med oss - Vem é dé du vill ha".

== Track listing ==
1. Vem é dé du vill ha
2. Vem é dé du vill ha (instrumental)

== Charts ==
=== Svensktoppen ===
Sweden Top 60
Week	8 March 2002	15 March 2002	22 March 2002	29 March 2002	5 April 2002	12 April 2002	19 April 2002
Position	45	33	32	49	51	50	56

=== Sverigetopplistan ===
Chart (2002)	Peak position
Sweden (Sverigetopplistan)	32
