= Lotta Engberg =

Swedish singer (born 1963)

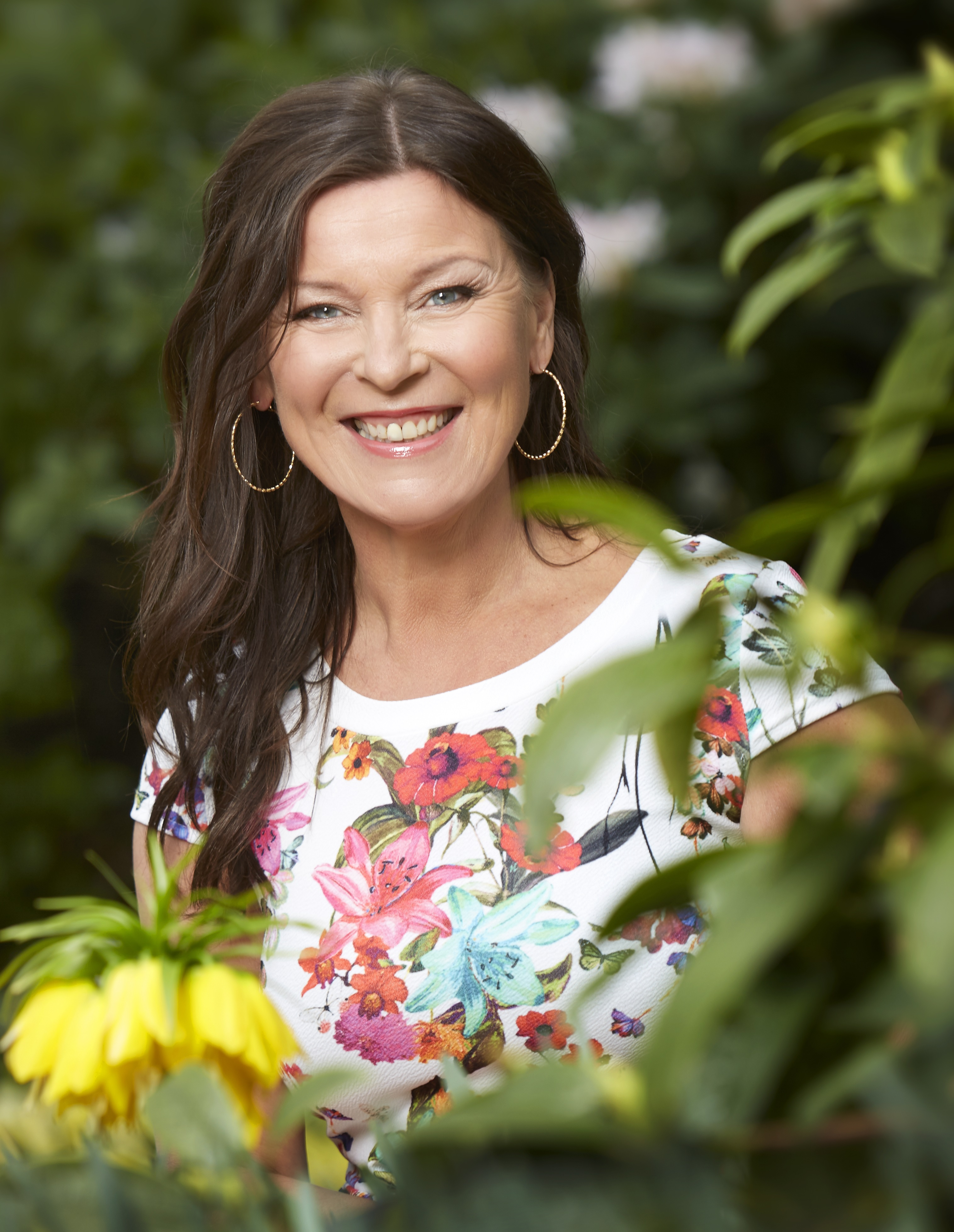
- Engberg in 2015

Background information
- Born: Anna Charlotte Pedersen; 5 March 1963 (age 63); Överkalix, Sweden
- Occupation: Singer
- Years active: 1980–present
- Website: lottaengberg.se
- Musical career
- Genres: Dansband; pop; schlager
- Instruments: Vocals; piano
- Label: Mariann
- Formerly of: Kikki, Bettan & Lotta

Anna Charlotte "Lotta" Engberg (born Pedersen; 5 March 1963) is a Swedish singer.

She represented Sweden in Eurovision Song Contest 1987 with "Boogaloo" after winning Melodifestivalen 1987. She also tried many times in Melodifestivalen in 1984, 1988, 1990, 1996, 2002 and 2012.

She was also a singer in a number of formations including "Trioala" early on, and in dansbands Lotta & Anders Engbergs orkester from 1989 to 1994, and after her divorce from Anders Engberg, in dansband Lotta Engbergs from 1994 until 2002. She continues now as a solo artist. On 2 October 1999, Sweden issued a postage stamp with her portrait. She also has a great number of collaborations including joint albums with Jarl Carlsson in 1987, Christer Sjögren and Willie Nelson, both in 2012.

== Career ==
Under her maiden name, Lotta Pedersen, she made her debut in the Sveriges Television program Nygammalt in 1980 when she was 17. She was also a member of the Trioala, an a cappella choir. Later, she received a permanent place in the TV program's choir.

== Marriage ==
She married Anders Engberg and took his surname in her recordings recording. She also became main vocalist for the dansband Lotta $ Anders Engbergs orkester that continued until 1994 when the couple divorced.

== In Melodifestivalen and Eurovision ==
She represented Sweden in Eurovision Song Contest 1987 after winning the Melodifestivalen of that year with "Fyra bugg & en Coca Cola". The song was renamed "Boogaloo" for the Eurovision competition and placed 12th.

She also tried in Melodifestivalen many other times but did not win to go on to the Eurovision finals.

- In Melodifestivalen 1984, she sang "Sankta Cecilia" in partnership with Göran Folkestad, coming second behind the later Eurovision winners, The Herreys
- In Melodifestivalen 1988, she sang "100%" in partnership with Triple & Touch, coming third.
- In Melodifestivalen 1990, she returned as a solo act singing "En gång till", coming eighth.
- In Melodifestivalen 1996, she took part with "Juliette & Jonathan", coming third.
- In Melodifestivalen 2002, she took part as the super group Kikki, Bettan & Lotta singing "Vem é dé du vill ha", finishing third
- In Melodifestivalen 2012, she took part with Christer Sjögren singing "Don't Let Me Down", finishing third in her semi final, also finishing third in the second chance round and narrowly missing out on a place in the Melodifestivalen 2012 final. The annual contest was in place won by Loreen of whom was the later Eurovision winner in Baku.

== Lotta & Anders Engbergs orkester ==
Lotta & Anders Engbergs orkester
- Origin: Skara, Sweden
- Genre: Dansband music
- Years active: 1989–1994
- Past members: Lotta Engberg; Anders Engberg; Patrik Ehlersson; Peter Åhs; Pedro Johansson; Jörgen Horneij

(This section is about the dansband and covers the period 1989 to 1994) Lotta & Anders Engbergs orkester was a dansband in Skara, Sweden which was active during the years 1989–1994, with Lotta Engberg as singer. She formed the band in 1989 with her then husband Anders Engberg, who already had a band in his own name. In 1993, the band was awarded a Grammis in 1993 for their album Kärlek gör mig tokig. It peaked at #33 at the Swedish album chart.

Lotta Engberg left the band around New Year 1993–1994, and started her own dansband, Lotta Engbergs orkester, following the couple's divorce. The remaining part of the band formed Anders Engbergs.

Members

- Lotta Engberg - vocals
- Anders Engberg - bass, saxophone, choir
- Patrik Ehlersson - guitar
- Peter Åhs - keyboards, sometimes also vocals
- Pedro Johansson - keyboards
- Jörgen Horneij - drums

Awards

In early 1994, because of the success of the album Kärlek gör mig tokig, the band was awarded a Grammis award for as "Best Dansband of 1993".

== Lotta Engbergs ==
Lotta Engbergs
- Also known as: Lotta Engbergs orkester
- Origin: Skara, Sweden
- Genre: Dansband
- Years active: 1994–2002
- Past members: Lotta Engberg; Peter Åhs; Pedro Johansson; Bengt Andersson; Per Strandberg; Patrik Ehlersson

(This section is about the dansband and covers the period 1994 to 2002)

Lotta Engbergs was a dansband in Skara, Sweden. The band was formed in 1994, when Lotta Engberg left Lotta & Anders Engbergs orkester. The band was, in its early days, known as Lotta Engbergs orkester, which later was shortened to just Lotta Engbergs. Lotta Engbergs was disbanded in 2002.

Members

- Lotta Engberg - vocals
- Peter Åhs - guitar, keyboards, sometimes also vocals
- Pedro Johansson - musical keyboards
- Bengt Andersson - drums
- Per Strandberg - bass, guitar, choirs, sometimes also vocals
- Patrik Ehlersson - guitar, bass

== Kikki, Bettan & Lotta ==
Kikki, Bettan & Lotta was a Swedish-Norwegian super trio, active 2001-2004 and consisting Kikki Danielsson, Elisabeth "Bettan" Andreassen and Lotta Engberg.

== Television career ==
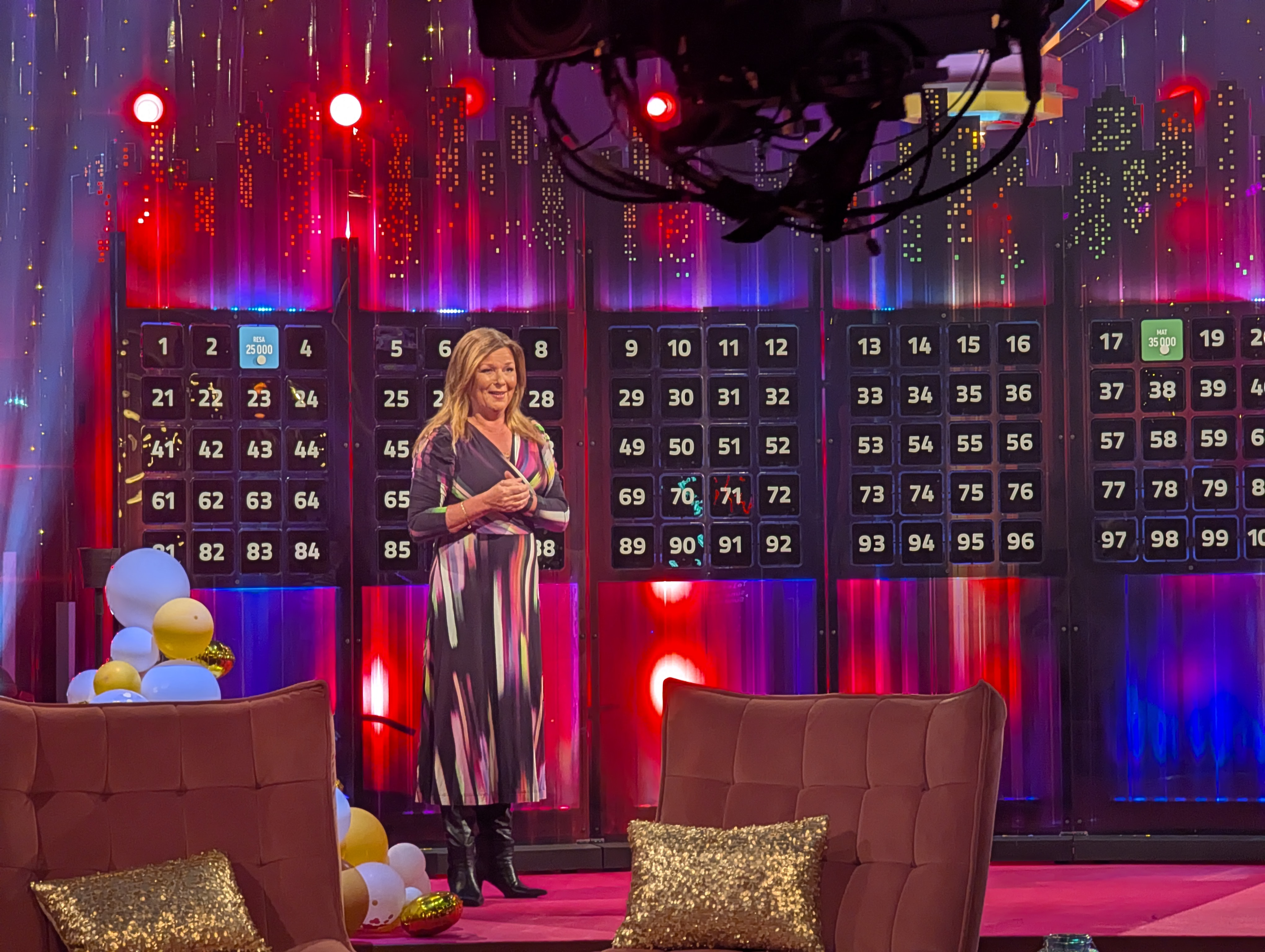
Engberg hosting Bingolotto in 2025

Lotta Engberg has also developed a prosperous television career.

- She hosted the Swedish sing-along show Lotta på Liseberg.
- From 2008 to 2011, she also hosted the Swedish game show Bingolotto

In 2014, Lotta Engberg competed as a celebrity dancer in Let's Dance.

== Personal life ==
Born in Överkalix, she was raised in Laxå, Örebro County. She was married to Anders Engberg, but they divorced in 1994. She now lives in Alingsås.

== Discography ==
- Fyra Bugg & en Coca Cola (1987)
- 100% (1988)

== Citations ==
Awards and achievements
Preceded by Monica Törnell & Lasse Holm	Sweden in the Eurovision Song Contest; 1987	Succeeded by Tommy Körberg
Preceded by (Sweden) Cecilia Vennersten	OGAE Second Chance Contest winner 1996	Succeeded by (Italy) Anna Oxa
