= Dansband =

Type of band

Dansbandsmusik
- Stylistic origins: Country; pop music; rock and roll; swing; schlager
- Cultural origins: 1970s, Sweden
- Typical instruments: Guitar; electric guitar; bass guitar; drums; keyboard; saxophone; accordion; steel guitar

Other topics
- Bingolotto; Dansbandskampen; music of Sweden; music of Norway; Svensktoppen

Dansband (Swedish pronunciation: [ˈdânsˌband]; "dance band"), or danseband in Norwegian and Danish, is a Swedish term for a band that plays dansbandsmusik (Swedish pronunciation: [ˈdânsˌbandsmɵˌsiːk]; "dance band music"). Dansbandsmusik is often danced to in pairs. Jitterbug and foxtrot music are often included in this category. The music is primarily inspired by schlager, country, rock'n'roll and some swing. The main influence for rock-oriented bands is the rock music of the 1950s and 1960s.

The terms dansband and dansbandsmusik were coined around 1970, when Swedish popular music developed a signature style. The genre developed primarily in Sweden, but has spread to neighbouring countries Norway, Denmark and the Swedish-speaking regions of Finland. When the music came to Norway it was first called "svensktoppar" (from the Swedish radio music chart Svensktoppen, which was a major arena for dansband music before its rules changed in January 2003).

A dansband often travels by bus, performing several times every week year-round, outdoors in the summertime and indoors in the wintertime. Performances are also often held on cruise ships.

Several dansbands are named after their lead singer (whose name is sometimes shortened), followed by "orkester" ("orchestra"). The tradition originates from the old dance orchestras, often named after their Kapellmeister. The possessive suffix "s" is often replaced by "z" in dansband names. Some dansbands are named after earlier members.

The music is often performed live by the bands at venues where the main interest of the audience is dancing, rather than watching the performance on stage. However, many dansbands also record albums and singles.

== Lyrics ==
Dansband lyrics are often upbeat, and are mostly about love, friendship and peace. Other lyrics are about dancing. Some lyrics are inspired by national romanticism, with lyrics about things such as old memories from the past, nature, or native districts. Romantic dansband lyrics are reminiscent of pop, where the singer declares his or her love for the person being sung to, but are often more focused on growing old together and living together until one of them dies. The Norwegian dansband Ole Ivars has also, with much humour, written lyrics that are more about society than traditional dansband lyrics.

The lyrics are often in Swedish in Sweden, and in Norwegian in Norway.

In the 1990s, special "dansband songwriters" broke through, among them Lasse Holm, Gert Lengstrand and Torgny Söderberg. For many years, the same persons wrote songs for most of the major names, but soon dansband musicians became more involved in songwriting.

== History ==
=== 1970s: Dancing in Folkets park ===
Before dansband music became popular, many jazz orchestras played a "schlager-inspired" dance music. Many people believe that the development of the dansbands during the 1950s and 1960s depended on the decreasing interest for jazz, it being replaced by pop and rock as the most popular music among young people. Many Swedish dansbands of the time were known as pop groups during the 1960s, a gestation period shared with the showband scene in Ireland, which had many similarities with its Nordic counterpart, especially in the influences referenced in creating a homegrown music scene such as jazz, American and British pop music, swing, and country.

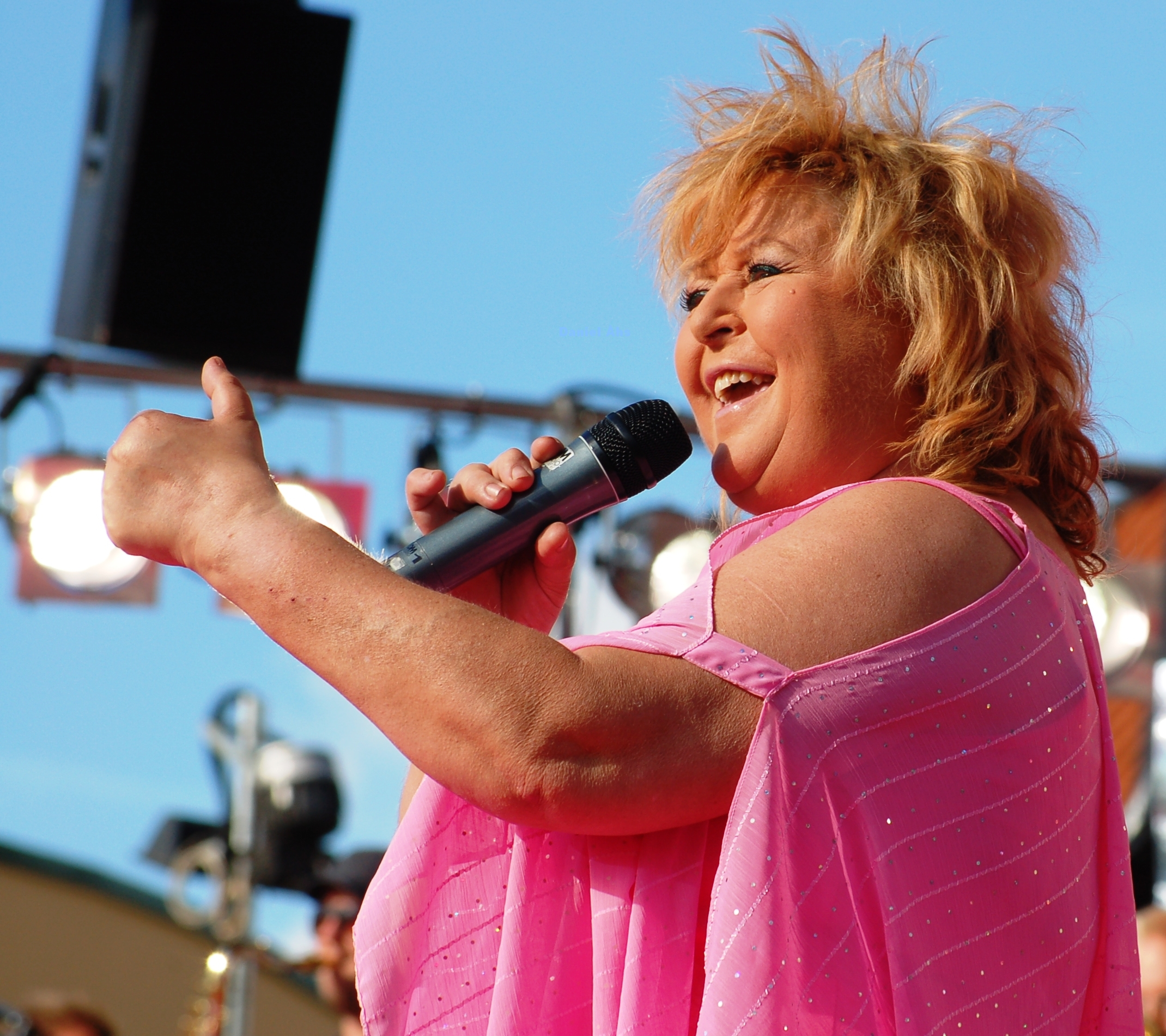
Kikki Danielsson broke through with Wizex in the 1970s.

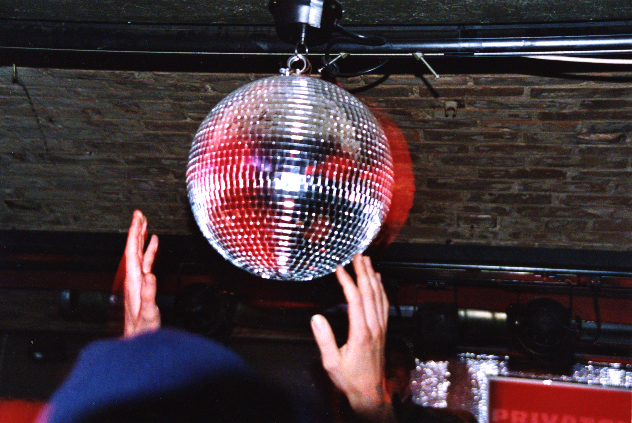
From the late 1970s until the late 1980s, disco music and nightclubs became a major competitor to dansbands in Sweden.

The golden era of dansband music was the 1970s, with bands like Thorleifs, Flamingokvintetten, Ingmar Nordströms, Wizex and Matz Bladhs. There were at most around 800 full-time working dansbands in Sweden; by the late 1990s this number was down to around 500.

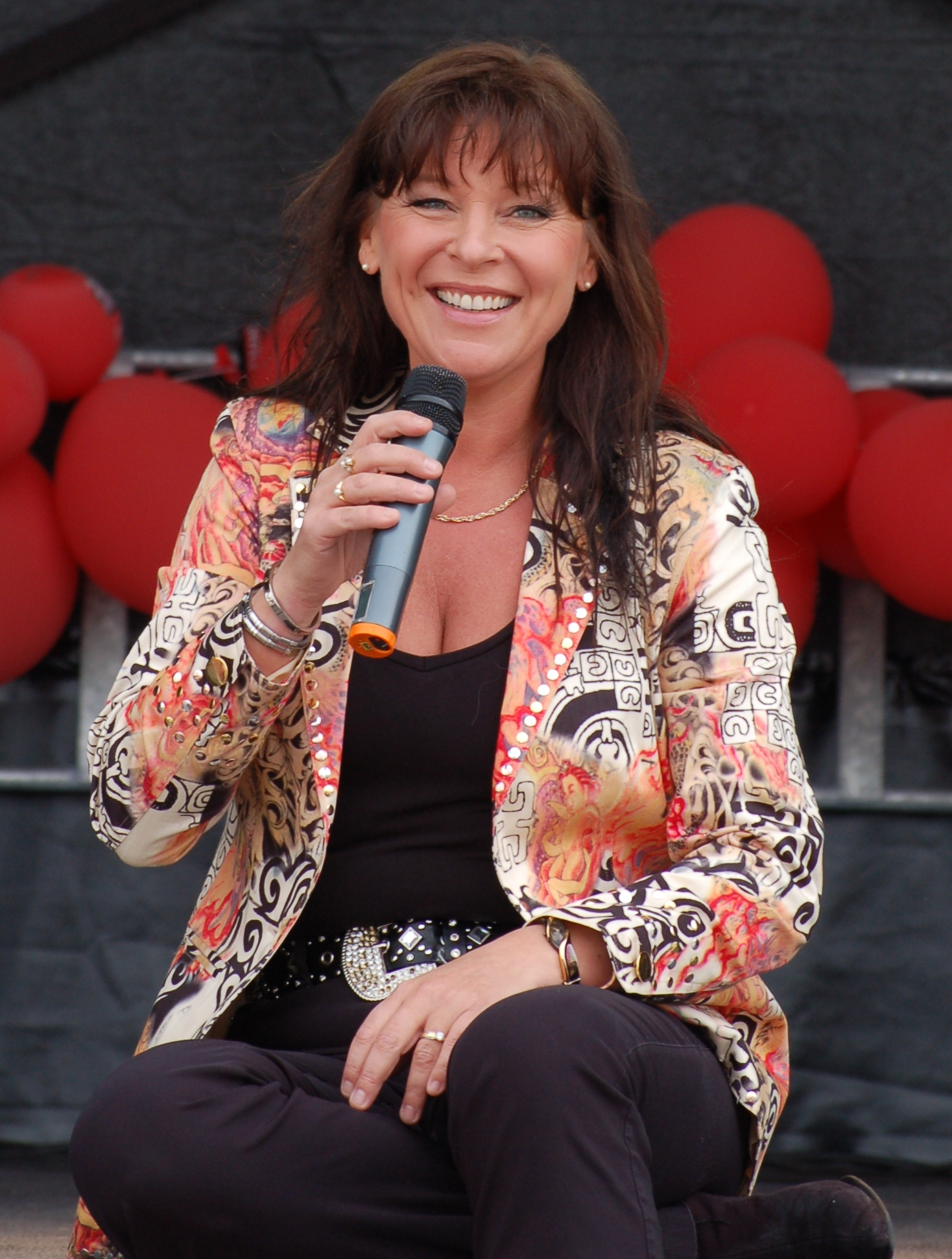
Lotta Engberg scored major dansband successes in Sweden during the rebirth of the genre between the late 1980s and the early 2000s, at first with the band of her former husband and later with her own band.

The term dansband was coined in Sweden in 1976, to sound more modern and tougher than the earlier dansorkester (dance orchestra), but later many of the bands have begun to call themselves "live bands".

In 1977, the song "Beatles", performed by Swedish dansband Forbes, won the Swedish Melodifestivalen 1977 and finished 18th (last) in the Eurovision Song Contest 1977.

For tax reasons, it was possible to write-off "fantasy" outfits in declaring of income, on the grounds that it would not be possible to wear such outfits in everyday life. This led to many bands wearing highly extravagant matched outfits in their stage performances.

=== 1980s: Dansband decline during the years of disco ===
By 1976–1977, pop groups like ABBA, The Bee Gees and Boney M. came to dominate dance floors and pop charts with disco. Some dansbands, like Sten & Stanley, "became turncoats", performing their own disco covers, and followed the disco fashion. However, most of these changes failed and "Dansband death" became a common expression. Several dansbands disbanded and soon only the full-time bands remained, highlighted by Matz Bladhs and Vikingarna. Performances often took place on boats and at town hotels, with male members appearing in a suit, which for many years would become a dansband stereotype.

In 1987, the song "Fyra Bugg & en Coca Cola" (renamed "Boogaloo" because of commercial controversy about the lyrics), performed by Swedish dansband singer Lotta Engberg, won the Swedish Melodifestivalen 1987 and finished 12th in the Eurovision Song Contest 1987. By the late 1980s and early 1990s, Lotta Engberg gained popularity in the Nordic region with a sound including several catchy and joyful melodies as the lead singer in Lotta & Anders Engbergs Orkester.

=== 1990s: I afton dans, rebirth and strong media attention ===
In the late 1980s, the decline of discothèques once again gave dansbands more space. They became more visible in the media. Sveriges Radio began broadcasting of "I afton dans" from several dancing venues, and café programmes in Sveriges Television invited dansbands as house bands. The early 1990s also saw a new period of popularity for Sven-Ingvars.

In 1993, the song "Eloise", performed by Swedish dansband Arvingarna, won the Swedish Melodifestivalen 1993 and finished 7th in the Eurovision Song Contest 1993. Arvingarna had a more pop and rock-oriented dansband sound, and gained popularity among many teenagers.

In 1999, Wizex singer Charlotte Nilsson performed the song "Tusen och en natt", with lyrics in English known as "Take Me to Your Heaven", winning both the Swedish Melodifestivalen 1999 and the Eurovision Song Contest 1999.

Vikingarna was one of the more popular dansbands in Sweden before being disbanded in 2004, but during the late 1990s and early 2000s (decade), they also toured (Germany) and recorded albums in German.

After a substantial decrease in the broadcasting of dansband music on radio and television in Sweden during the early 2000s (decade), despite their continuing popularity with the wider public, the dansbands declared that they were being discriminated against in August 2007, since Sveriges Radio plays many different genres of music, especially if the songs are written or performed by Swedes. The dansbands reported Sveriges Radio to Granskningsnämnden för radio och TV (the Swedish Broadcasting Commission) in what became known as Dansbandsupproret ("the dansband rebellion"), which was covered widely by the mass media. However, a few days later the commission decided not to take up the matter.

In recent years, artists have begun to mix dansband music with other genres. Per Arnez, for example, has gained some fame by remixing dansband with hip-hop.

== Sub-genres ==
Dansband has been split into many sub-genres, arguably due to the aging audience and the influence of pop-music.

- Moget, Swedish for 'mature', is the older form of dansband, characterized by slower tempo and easier rhythms. The bands playing moget usually play covers of songs from the 1950s and 1960s.
- Modernt, Swedish for 'modern', exists as a contrast to moget, in that it is the most modern and recently crafted songs and styles. It features songs played at a higher tempo with influences from contemporary pop music.

== Svensktoppen and Bingolotto ==
The Swedish Sveriges Radio chart Svensktoppen was dominated by dansbands between 1993 and 2002. When the rules were changed in January 2003 to allow songs in languages other than Swedish, dansband music started to decline and was replaced with conventional pop and rock. Dansband music also dominated the musical interludes in Bingolotto until Leif "Loket" Olsson resigned as presenter in 1999.
