= Melodifestivalen 2011 =

Swedish music competition

Dates and venues
- Heat 1: 5 February 2011
- Heat 2: 12 February 2011
- Heat 3: 19 February 2011
- Heat 4: 26 February 2011
- Second chance: 5 March 2011
- Final: 12 March 2011; Globe Arena, Stockholm

Production
- Broadcaster: Sveriges Television (SVT)
- Director: Daniel Jelinek; Janne Jansson
- Presenters: Marie Serneholt and Rickard Olsson

Participants
- Number of entries: 32: 8 in each heat; 10 in the final (2 from each heat, 2 from the Second Chance round)

Vote
- Voting system: 50% Jury, 50% SMS and telephone voting 11 international juries give 1, 2, 4, 6, 8, 10 and 12 points to their seven favourite songs. People can vote by televote or SMS. Televoting points are based on percentages, totalling 473 points. If an entry gets 10% of the tele-votes it will be equivalent to 10% of 473 points.
- Winning song: "Popular" by Eric Saade

Melodifestivalen 2011 was a Swedish song contest held in February and March 2011. It selected Sweden's 51st song to represent Sweden in the Eurovision Song Contest, and was the 50th edition of Melodifestivalen. Eric Saade, with the song "Popular", won the contest and thus was selected to represent Sweden in the Eurovision Song Contest 2011.

== Format ==
The 2011 edition of Melodifestivalen was similar to the previous year's arrangement, with four heats, a second-chance round and a grand final. The four heats were held in Luleå (5 February), Gothenburg (12 February), Linköping (19 February) and Malmö (26 February). The second chance round was held in Sundsvall on 5 March and the final in Stockholm was held on 12 March. SVT presented the competing songs during autumn 2010.

As in 2010 and 2009, a maximum of eight people were allowed on stage, while only persons of 16 years or over would be eligible. (However, in accordance with Eurovision rules, only six people were allowed on stage for the Swedish entry at Eurovision.) The main singer(s) had to perform vocals live on stage, however other backing vocals could be pre-recorded along with the song's backing track.

There was a large change in the way that the 32 songs were selected. In 2010, 27 songs were selected by a selection panel, 4 songs were then selected by SVT in order to diversify the musical quality of the contest and one song was then selected through a "Web wildcard" competition. Members of the public were allowed to submit songs onto the SVT website, with the public selecting one song through SMS voting. For 2011, this was changed: only 15 songs were selected by the selection panel. The remaining 15 songs were then selected by SVT, from remaining submissions made to the selection panel, or from specially invited artists and songs. The web wildcard competition was expanded; instead of just one song was chosen, the public selected two songs. The web wildcard competition began on 11 October, and ended with a live show on 8 November on SVT24, held at the Golden Hits nightclub in Stockholm.

Other changes introduced to Melodifestivalen 2011 were revealed by SVT. For the first time, non-Swedish songwriters were able to enter songs into the contest, as long as there is at least one Swedish songwriter also contributing. Solo singer-instrumentalists were now allowed to perform their instruments live during the TV broadcast.

On 17 November, SVT announced Marie Serneholt and Rickard Olsson as the hosts for the heats, the second chance and the final, but there was also a guest host in each program.

=== Changes ===
- All entries were submitted via Melodifestivalen website instead of by post.
- The selection panel and SVT chose fifteen entries each, instead of the selection panel choosing twenty-seven and SVT four.
- Foreign songwriters could post entries, but only in combination with at least one Swedish author.
- Artists were able to play at least one instrument live on stage.
- In the regular selection process, it was the only established songwriters who could submit entries. The public were only allowed to submit entries to the web wildcard competition.
- As in previous years, the songs may be up to three minutes on stage, but a new rule is that they must be at least two minutes long.
- The whole voting in the final will be changed. The total value of the votes are 946 points, which means that tele-votes and jury-votes represent 50/50 each. If an entry is getting 10% of the tele-votes it will be equivalent to 47 points. The Swedish jury groups are replaced by 11 international groups. Each jury group gives their points according to the ESC-standard: 1, 2, 4, 6, 8, 10 and 12 points. If two songs end up at the same position, the people's votes will overrule the jury-votes.

== Schedule ==
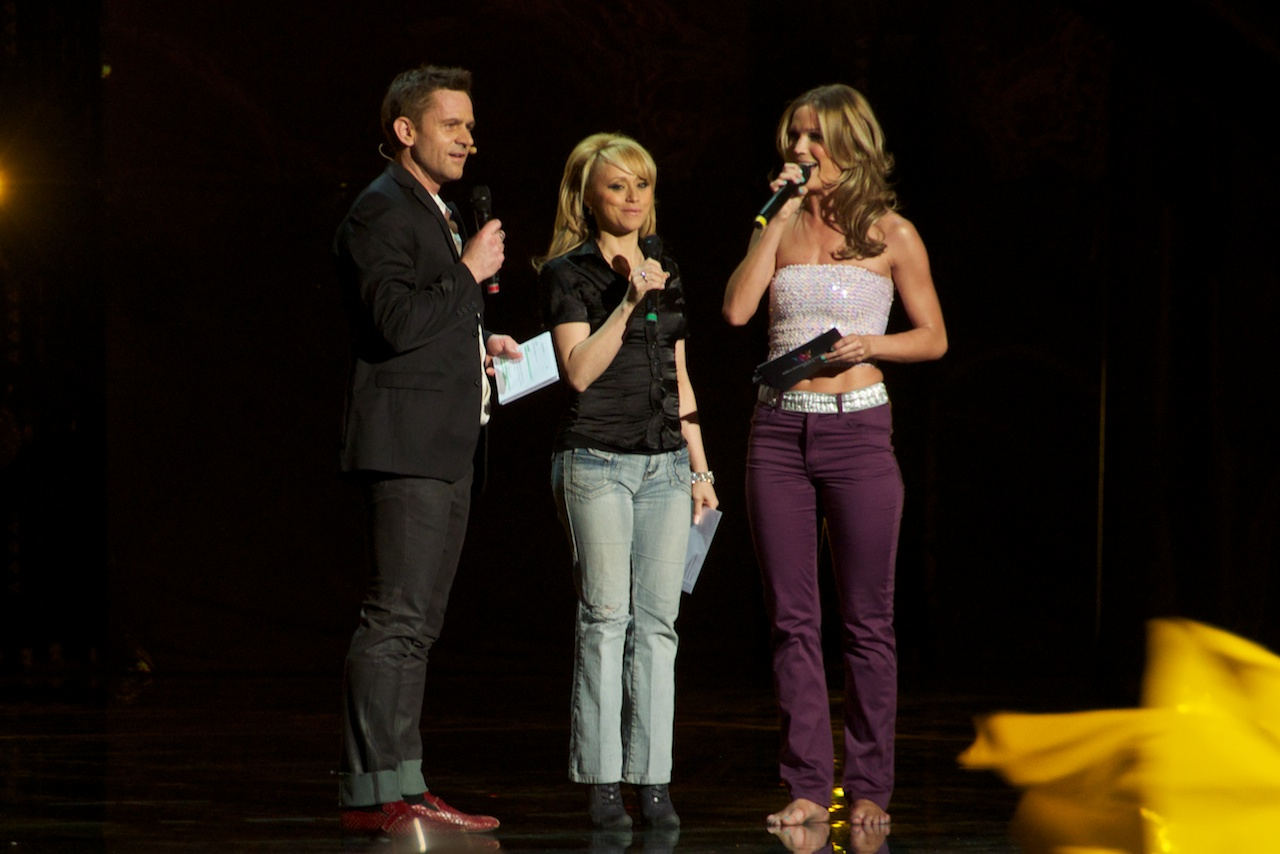
Rickard Olsson, Nanne Grönvall and Marie Serneholt during the first heat broadcast

Date	City	Venue	Heat	Host(s)	Guest artist(s)
8 November	Stockholm	Golden Hits	Web wild card final	Henric von Zweibergk	-
5 February	Luleå	Coop Norrbotten Arena	Heat 1	Marie Serneholt, Rickard Olsson and Elsa Billgren	Peter Stormare and Nanne Grönvall
12 February	Gothenburg	Scandinavium	Heat 2	Marie Serneholt, Rickard Olsson and Elsa Billgren	Peter Stormare and Christer Sjögren
19 February	Linköping	Cloetta Center	Heat 3	Marie Serneholt, Rickard Olsson and Elsa Billgren	Peter Stormare and Lena Philipsson
26 February	Malmö	Malmö Arena	Heat 4	Marie Serneholt, Rickard Olsson and Elsa Billgren	Peter Stormare and The Ark
5 March	Sundsvall	Nordichallen	Second chance (Andra chansen)	Marie Serneholt, Rickard Olsson and Elsa Billgren	-
12 March	Stockholm	Globen	Final	Marie Serneholt, Rickard Olsson and Elsa Billgren	All of the Above, Dynazty, and Anna Bergendahl

== Entries ==
32 songs competed in Melodifestivalen 2011. 15 of them were selected from a public call for songs, in which public songwriters and artists could send in songs to SVT, until 21 September 2010. The format for the contest remained the same from last year's, the same format that was introduced in 2002. The 32 songs were presented over 4 heats. A public televote was held to select two songs to progress directly to the final, with the 3rd and 4th placed songs progressing to a Second Chance (Andra Chansen) round. The eight songs in the Second Chance round battled in duels until two songs are left, which also progress to the final. In the final, the votes of the public constituted 50% of the total vote, with the remaining 50% coming from the juries.

On 22 September, SVT announced that a record number of 3852 entries have been submitted. 424 of them were submitted to the web wildcard selection.

=== Web wildcards ===
From July to November 2010 SVT held the second Melodifestivalen web wildcard contest. From 9 July to 21 September musicians with no previous music contract could submit songs to the SVT Melodifestivalen website. From 11 October the 232 submissions could be voted on by SMS voting, with only five being left to progress to the web wildcard final on 8 November.

Of the 424 entries entered into the contest, 232 were selected to compete after disqualifying those that did not meet the rules of the contest.

- 11 October 2010 - all 232 entries were made available for voting
- 18 October 2010 - 100 entries went on to the next round
- 25 October 2010 - 50 entries went on to the next round
- 27 October 2010 - 20 entries went on to the next round (the votes were now reset for the remaining songs)
- 29 October 2010 - 15 entries went on to the next round
- 31 October 2010 - 10 entries went on to the next round
- 1–5 November 2010 - ten entries left, one song voted out every day
- 8 November 2010 - five entries remained in the web wildcard final, where two songs were selected to compete in the Melodifestivalen heats

On 31 October the top ten songs were announced by SVT. From 1 November one song was eliminated every day, leaving five songs on 5 November. The final two winners were announced on 8 November in a live TV final on SVT24. The eliminated songs in the top 10 were:

Artist	Song (English translation)	Songwriter(s)	Place	Date Eliminated
Anton & Dejo	"I Wanna Be With You"	Dennis Andersson, Anton Dahlrot	—	—
Billy	"Tusen nätter" (Thousand nights)	Daniel Wollbratt	—	—
Engla	"Don't Stop"	Sargon Jakob	—	—
Jonas Matsson	"On My Own"	Peter Autio, Sari Autio Olsson	—	—
Julia Alvgard	"Better or Worse"	Manne Hjelm, Ola Holstad, Joar Lenz	—	—
Björn Hasselquist	"Beautiful World"	Björn Hasselquist	6	5 November
Madeleine Jangklev	"Stay With Me"	Madeleine Jangklev, Nic Arphult	7	4 November
Fredrik & Magnus	"Get Out"	Fredrik Hanefalk, Magnus Paues	8	3 November
Trison	"Lovar och svär" (Promise and Swear)	Tony Andersson	9	2 November
Succubus	"Raise Your Hands"	Daniel Lindberg	10	1 November

=== Final ===
The two winners of the web wildcard contest were decided on 8 November at the Golden Hits nightclub in Stockholm, hosted by Henric von Zweibergk, floor manager of Melodifestivalen. Televoting and SMS voting decided the final winner, which was announced by executive producer Christer Björkman.

R/O	Artist	Song	Songwriter(s)
1	Billy	"Tusen nätter"	Daniel Wollbratt
2	Julia Alvgard	"Better or Worse"	Manne Hjelm, Ola Holstad, Joar Lenz
3	Anton & Dejo	"I Wanna Be With You"	Dennis Andersson, Anton Dahlrot
4	Engla	"Don't Stop"	Sargon Jakob
5	Jonas Matsson	"On My Own"	Peter Autio, Sari Autio Olsson

== Heats ==
The four heats were, for this edition, held in Luleå, Gothenburg, Linköping and Malmö. The jury, which chose the fifteen songs of the over 3000 submissions, were selected at the end of September 2010. SVT's fifteen wild cards and the jury's choice has and will be revealed before the end of November 2010. The two web wildcards were chosen by viewers on 8 November 2010.

SVT announced the first four songs on 7 October, which featured the return of three-time competitor Linda Bengtzing. A further eight songs were announced on 19 October, with Sanna Nielsen and Danny returning. The 13th song in Melodifestivalen 2011 was revealed on 1 November: Lars-Åke Wilhelmsson, aka Babsan, will compete with "Ge mig en spanjor", and on 3 November SVT revealed that Nicke Borg will also compete in the contest with the song "Leaving Home".

On 7 November it was revealed by Expressen that former Eurovision Song Contest winner Elisabeth Andreassen would make a return to Melodifestivalen in 2011. Andreassen won the 1985 Eurovision for Norway as part of Bobbysocks!, and also took part in 1994 (with Jan Werner Danielsen). She also competed for Norway in 1996, and in 1982 for Sweden (as part of Chips). On 8 November SVT confirmed that Andreassen would make a comeback to Melodifestivalen, and will take part with the song "Vaken i en dröm". Also on 8 November the web wildcard contest ended with a live TV final on SVT24. Julia Alvgard and Jonas Matsson won after the public televote with the songs "Better or Worse" and "On My Own".

On 22 November, a further six entries were revealed by SVT. However, during this press conference SVT revealed the entries that would compete in the first two heats. The remaining entries were announced on a press conferences on 29 November, which featured the return of Shirley Clamp and Eric Saade. However, on 27 November, Christer Björkman revealed the Swedish dance band The Playtones would participate in Melodifestivalen 2011 with the song "The King". The song "Don't Stop" was disqualified because it has been published on Chasez MySpace. However, SVT told the songwriters and the artist Andreas Fernette to write a new song. On 10 December, SVT announced Fernette's new song "Run".

On 5 January 2011, SVT revealed Love Generation's song "Dance Alone" and the running order for each heat.

SVT announced that this years Melodifestivalen would have the same rules in the heats as there were in Melodifestivalen 2010. This means that the song which receiving the most votes in the first round would automatically qualify to the final, skipping the second round. The remaining top four would battle again for a place in the final and Andra Chansen round - the 2nd placed song qualifying to the final, the 3rd and 4th placed songs progressing to Andra Chansen, and the song placed fifth will be eliminated from the competition. However, SVT will not announce the vote result for each song until the final has been broadcast.

=== Heat 1 ===
The first heat was held on 5 February 2011 in Coop Norrbotten Arena, Luleå. The songs are in running order.

R/O	Artist	Song (English translation)	Songwriter(s)	Votes		Place	Result
R/O	Artist	Song (English translation)	Songwriter(s)	Round 1	Round 2	Place	Result
1	Dilba	"Try Again"	Niklas Pettersson, Linda Sonnvik	9 256	—	8	Out
2	Swingfly	"Me and My Drum"	Teron Beal, Patrik Magnusson, Johan Ramström, Swingfly	25 634	42 104	2	Final
3	Jenny Silver	"Something in Your Eyes"	Erik Bernholm, Thomas G:son, Henrik Sethsson	27 017	37 262	3	Second Chance
4	Jonas Matsson	"On My Own"	Peter Autio, Sari Autio Olsson	10 860	—	7	Out
5	Le Kid	"Oh My God"	Märta Grauers, Anton Malmberg Hård af Segerstad, Felix Persson	16 512	16 459	5	Out
6	Rasmus Viberg	"Social Butterfly"	Amir Aly, Henrik Wikström	15 151	—	6	Out
7	Pernilla Andersson	"Desperados" (Desperadoes)	Pernilla Andersson	27 840	30 724	4	Second Chance
8	Danny Saucedo	"In the Club"	Figge Boström, Peter Boström, Danny Saucedo	60 872	—	1	Final

=== Heat 2 ===
The second heat was held on 12 February 2011 in Scandinavium, Gothenburg. The songs are in running order.

R/O	Artist	Song (English translation)	Songwriter(s)	Votes		Place	Result
R/O	Artist	Song (English translation)	Songwriter(s)	Round 1	Round 2	Place	Result
1	Brolle	"7 Days and 7 Nights"	Brolle	39 319	72 737	2	Final
2	Loreen	"My Heart Is Refusing Me"	Moh Denebi, Björn Djupström, Lorén Talhaoui	19 749	31 034	4	Second Chance
3	Babsan	"Ge mig en spanjor" (Give me a Spaniard)	Larry Forsberg, Sven-Inge Sjöberg, Lennart Wastesson	14 642	—	7	Out
4	Elisabeth Andreassen	"Vaken i en dröm" (Awake in a dream)	Lars "Dille" Diedricson, Calle Kindbom, Kristian Wejshag	13 010	—	8	Out
5	Sanna Nielsen	"I'm in Love"	Bobby Ljunggren, Thomas G:son, Irini Michas, Peter Boström	43 524	—	1	Final
6	The Moniker	"Oh My God!"	Daniel Karlsson	28 624	37 631	3	Second Chance
7	Anniela	"Elektrisk" (Electric)	Johan Alkenäs, Tim Larsson, Tobias Lundgren, Johan Fransson	15 948	—	6	Out
8	Christian Walz	"Like Suicide"	Fernando Fuentes, Henrik Janson, Tony Nilsson	26 951	28 242	5	Out

=== Heat 3 ===
The third heat was held on 19 February 2011 in Cloetta Center, Linköping. The songs are in running order.

R/O	Artist	Song (English translation)	Songwriter(s)	Votes		Place	Result
R/O	Artist	Song (English translation)	Songwriter(s)	Round 1	Round 2	Place	Result
1	Linda Sundblad	"Lucky You"	Linda Sundblad, Johan Bobäck, Fredrik Thomander, Anders "Gary" Wikström	10 701	—	6	Out
2	Simon Forsberg	"Tid att andas" (Time to breathe)	Fredrik Kempe	8 339	—	8	Out
3	Sara Lumholdt	"Enemy"	Niclas Lundin, Anton Malmberg Hård af Segerstad	8 689	—	7	Out
4	The Playtones	"The King"	Fredrik Kempe, Peter Kvint	48 861	50 090	2	Final
5	Shirley's Angels	"I Thought It Was Forever"	Robin Abrahamsson, Alexander Bard, Bobby Ljunggren, Henrik Wikström	20 573	26 933	4	Second Chance
6	Sebastian	"No One Else Could"	Andreas Alfredsson Grube, Sebastian Karlsson	15 406	25 423	5	Out
7	Sara Varga	"Spring för livet" (Run for your life)	Sara Varga, Figge Boström	23 594	37 278	3	Second Chance
8	Eric Saade	"Popular"	Fredrik Kempe	89 175	—	1	Final

=== Heat 4 ===
The fourth heat was held on 26 February 2011 in Malmö Arena, Malmö. The songs are in running order.

R/O	Artist	Song (English translation)	Songwriter(s)	Votes		Place	Result
R/O	Artist	Song (English translation)	Songwriter(s)	Round 1	Round 2	Place	Result
1	Melody Club	"The Hunter"	Kristofer Östergren, Erik Stenemo, Jon Axelsson, Niklas Stenemo	14 954	—	7	Out
2	Julia Alvgard	"Better or Worse"	Julia Alvgard, Manne Hjelm, Ola Holstad, Joar Lenz	18 867	—	6	Out
3	Lasse Stefanz	"En blick och nånting händer" (One look and something happens)	Alexander Bard, Ola Håkansson, Tim Norell	32 686	26 355	5	Out
4	Linda Pritchard	"Alive"	Oscar Görres, Fredrik Kempe	24 849	39 092	4	Second Chance
5	Anders Fernette	"Run"	Desmond Child, Negin Djafari, Hugo Lira, Ian-Paolo Lira, Thomas Gustafsson	11 979	—	8	Out
6	Linda Bengtzing	"E de fel på mig?" (Is there something wrong with me?)	Pontus Assarsson, Thomas G:son, Jörgen Ringqvist, Daniel Barkman	38 875	—	1	Final
7	Nicke Borg	"Leaving Home"	Jojo Borg Larsson, Nicke Borg, Fredrik Thomander, Anders "Gary" Wikström	34 091	48 966	2	Final
8	Love Generation	"Dance Alone"	RedOne, Bilal "The Chef", Teddy Sky, AJ Junior, Jimmy Joker, BeatGeek	38 122	43 508	3	Second Chance

=== Second Chance ===
The Andra Chansen (Second Chance) round was held on 5 March in Nordichallen, Sundsvall. Eight acts qualified for this round from the heats - the songs that placed 3rd and 4th. A duel format was used, with each song battling against another in order to remain in the contest and qualify for the final on 12 March.

During the show, the on-screen graphics displayed the wrong phone numbers on the Radiohjälpen number during Duels 1, 2 and 3. SVT discounted all the votes to the Radiohjälpen number in these duels to declare the winning artist.

Round 1
Jenny Silver - "Something in Your Eyes"	32,942
Love Generation - "Dance Alone"	34,212
Loreen - "My Heart is Refusing Me"	42,892
Sara Varga - "Spring för livet"	54,807
The Moniker - "Oh my God!"	63,963
Linda Pritchard - "Alive"	40,689
Shirley's Angels - "I Thought It Was Forever"	30,042
Pernilla Andersson - "Desperados"	54,235

Round 2
Love Generation - "Dance Alone"	46,639
Sara Varga - "Spring för livet"	65,713
The Moniker - "Oh my God!"	68,478
Pernilla Andersson - "Desperados"	49,559

Qualifiers
Sara Varga - "Spring för livet"
The Moniker - "Oh my God!"

== Final ==
The final of Melodifestivalen 2011 was held on 12 March 2011 at the Globe Arena in Stockholm. The two winners from each of the four heats and the two Second chance winners qualified for the final, A total of 10 songs. The winner was decided by a mix of televoting/SMS voting and jury voting.

On 17 December 2010, Swedish newspaper Expressen announced that SVT planned to change the voting system in the Melodifestivalen Final. On 10 January 2011, SVT gave details about that. The value of the votes was 946 points, which meant that tele-votes and jury-votes represent 50/50 each. If an entry is getting 10% of the tele-votes, it would be equivalent to 47 points.

The Swedish jury groups were replaced by eleven international groups. Each jury group gave their points as follows: 1, 2, 4, 6, 8, 10 and 12 points. If two songs end up at the same position, the people's votes would overrule the jury votes. The running order for the Final was made immediately after the Second Chance round.

R/O	Artist	Song	Juries	Televote/SMS/App			Total	Place
R/O	Artist	Song	Juries	Votes	Percentage	Points	Total	Place
1	Danny Saucedo	"In the Club"	79	197.143	14.9%	70	149	2
2	Sara Varga	"Spring för livet"	23	76.025	5.8%	27	50	9
3	The Moniker	"Oh My God!"	55	194.568	14.7%	69	124	3
4	Brolle	"7 Days and 7 Nights"	8	57.717	4.3%	21	29	10
5	Linda Bengtzing	"E det fel på mej?"	42	43.355	3.2%	16	58	7
6	Nicke Borg	"Leaving Home"	20	103.046	7.8%	37	57	8
7	Swingfly	"Me and My Drum"	44	138.004	10.4%	49	93	5
8	Sanna Nielsen	"I'm in Love"	75	109.630	8.2%	39	114	4
9	The Playtones	"The King"	46	92.505	7.0%	33	79	6
10	Eric Saade	"Popular"	81	314.229	23.7%	112	193	1

Detailed International Jury Votes
R/O	Song	Russia	Ukraine	France	Greece	Malta	Croatia	San Marino	Germany	United Kingdom	Ireland	Norway	Total
R/O	Song	Russia	Ukraine	France	Greece	Malta	Croatia	San Marino	Germany	United Kingdom	Ireland	Norway	Total
1	"In the Club"	10	4	10	10	10	4	6	12	1	6	6	79
2	"Spring för livet"	2			4		6	8	1	2			23
3	"Oh My God!"	12	8	8	1				4	6	8	8	55
4	"7 Days and 7 Nights"		1			2	1					4	8
5	"E det fel på mej?"	8	2	2	6	6	12	4			2		42
6	"Leaving Home"					1		10	8			1	20
7	"Me and My Drum"			1				12	10	8	1	12	44
8	"I'm in Love"	1	12	6	12	8	10			4	12	10	75
9	"The King"	6	6	4	2	4	2	2	6	10	4		46
10	"Popular"	4	10	12	8	12	8	1	2	12	10	2	81

== See also ==
- Sweden in the Eurovision Song Contest
- Eurovision Song Contest 2011
