= Start Talking =

Studio album by Bulletrain
- Released: 24 October 2014
- Recorded: 2013
- Genre: Heavy metal, hard rock, glam metal
- Length: 46:29
- Label: Metal Heaven
- Producer: Bulletrain, Marcus Forsberg and RamPac (Johan Ramström and Patrik Magnusson)

Singles from Start Talking
- 1. "Out of control" Released: August 20, 2014; 2. "Phantom pain" Released: December 15, 2014

Start Talking is the self-produced debut album from Swedish heavy metal band Bulletrain, released 24 October 2014, through Metal Heaven records.

== Recording process ==
The recordings for the band's debut began as early as in late 2011 when the group decided to record their third EP. It was later cancelled when they parted ways with the singer Mike Palace in 2012. Since the group had such amount of material already they took the chance and started recording the music for a full-length album. Together with Marcus Forsberg at Tweak Studios in Helsingborg they started the recording process in 2013. In the winter of 2013, Bulletrain went to Stockholm to finish the record with the vocals for the album with the producers RamPac (Johan Ramström, Patrik Magnusson). It was mixed and mastered by Buster Odeholm.

== Track listing ==
No.	Title	Lyrics	Music	Length
1.	"Nothing But Trouble"	Tillheden	Persson	3:23
2.	"All For One"	Tillheden	Persson	4:33
3.	"Dark Days(Dark Nights)"	Bengtsson	Persson	4:20
4.	"From The Bottom Of My Heart"	Tillheden	Persson	3:15
5.	"Even With My Eyes Closed"	Tillheden	Persson	4:01
6.	"Start Talking"	Bengtsson, Tillheden	Persson	3:36
7.	"Out of Control"	Tillheden	Persson	3:15
8.	"Phantom Pain"	Tillheden	Persson	2:48
9.	"Bad Blood(Out of Love)"	Tillheden	Persson	5:56
10.	"Dicing With Death"	Tillheden	Persson	2:52
11.	"Take Me To The Sun"	Tillheden	Persson	4:24
12.	"Joanna's Secret"	Tillheden	Persson	4:06

== Singles ==
- "Out of Control"
- "Phantom Pain"

== Personnel ==
- Jonas Tillheden - drums, backing vocals
- Mattias Persson - lead guitar, backing vocals
- Robin Bengtsson - rhythm guitar, backing vocals
- Sebastian Sundberg - lead vocals
- Niklas Månsson - bass guitar, backing vocals

=== Additional musicians ===
- Gustav Bergström, bass guitar on tracks "From the bottom of my heart", "Out of control" and "Phantom pain".
- Kalle Yttergren, backing vocals on tracks "Dicing with death" and "Joanna's secret".
