= Bulletrain =

Swedish rock band

BuLLETRAiN
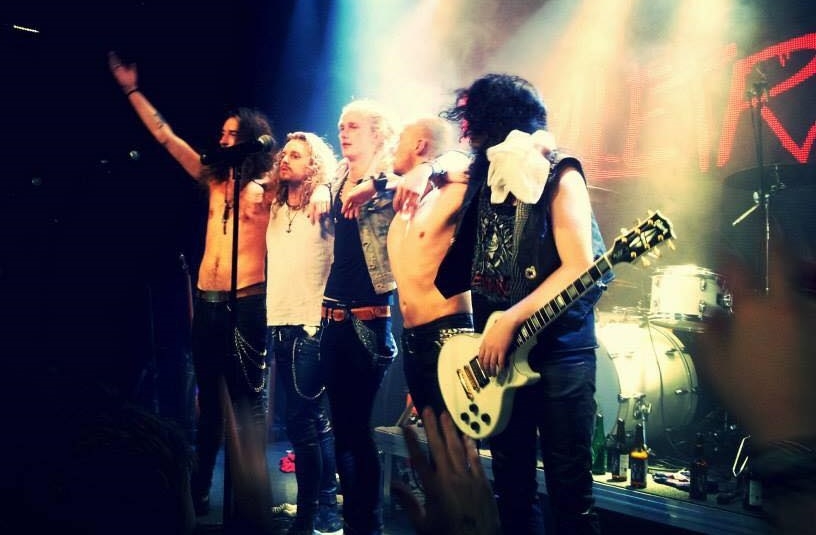
- Bulletrain live at "The Tivoli" in Helsingborg

Background information
- Origin: Helsingborg, Sweden
- Genres: Sleaze rock, hard rock, glam metal
- Years active: 2006–present
- Label: Metal Heaven
- Members: Jonas Tillheden; Mattias Persson; Robin Bengtsson; Sebastian Sundberg; Niklas Mansson
- Past members: Robert Lindell; Tim Svalo; Mike Palace
- Website: bulletrain.org

Bulletrain is a Swedish hard rock band formed in Helsingborg's suburbs in 2006 by drummer Jonas Tillheden and guitarist Mattias Persson, along with singer Robert Lindell, bassist Tim Svalo, and guitarist Robin Bengtsson. Their music is influenced by bands like Mötley Crüe, Guns N' Roses, Skid Row and Pantera.

== History ==
In 2007, the band released their first EP, Johnny GoneBad, produced by Klas Ideberg of the Helsingborg-based band Darkane. The EP was well received, leading to local gigs opening for bands such as Crashdïet, Bullet and Crazy Lixx. In late 2009, the band released their second EP, Turn It Up, also produced by Ideberg.

Later in 2009, the band experienced their first setback when bassist Tim Svalo left the group and Emil Lundberg replaced him. The band reached a milestone in spring 2010 when they performed at the "Rest In Sleaze" festival, dedicated to former Crashdïet lead singer Dave Lepard, who had died. This performance led to a minor Italian tour and an offer from musician/producer Chris Laney (known for work with Crashdïet and Crazy Lixx) to record a single.

On 16 July 2010, the band recorded "Even with My Eyes Closed" and "Take Me to the Sun" at Polar Studios in Stockholm. Bass was played by Therion's bassist Nalle Pahlsson after Emil Lundberg departed the day before the recording. While the single "Even with My Eyes Closed" attracted attention from Georg Siegl of Metal Heaven, the band faced another setback when singer Robert Lindell left, causing the project to stall.

The band endured several difficult years. Mike Palace from Stockholm briefly joined as vocalist, but the geographical distance proved problematic. During this period, Tim Svalo returned briefly as bassist but left again following Palace's departure.

The remaining members—Jonas, Mattias, and Robin—persevered and began recording their debut album independently. In summer 2013, they recruited Växjö native Sebastian Sundberg and bassist Niklas Mansson. That winter, Bulletrain returned to Stockholm to collaborate with production duo RamPac (Johan Ramstrom and Patrik Magnusson), known for producing Crashdïet's album Generation Wild. After Buster Odeholm of Humanity's Last Breath mixed the material, the debut album was completed and the results exceeded expectations.

In summer 2014, Georg Siegl offered the band a second chance, agreeing to release their debut album Start Talking on his Metal Heaven label. In winter 2015, Bulletrain partnered again with RamPac to record their follow-up album What You Fear the Most in Riga, Latvia. The album was mixed by Tobias Lindell (known for work with Hardcore Superstar, Europe and H.E.A.T) and mastered by Vlado Meller (known for work with Slipknot, Metallica, Michael Jackson, Pink Floyd).

== Band members ==
Current members

- Jonas Tillheden – drums (2006–present)
- Mattias Persson – lead guitar (2006–present)
- Robin Bengsston – rhythm guitar (2006/2007–present)
- Sebastian Sundberg – vocals (2013–present)
- Niklas Mansson – bass (2013–present)

Former members

- Robert Lindell – vocals (2006–2011)
- Tim Svalo – bass (2006–2009, 2011–2012)
- Mike Palace – vocals (2011–2012)

== Discography ==
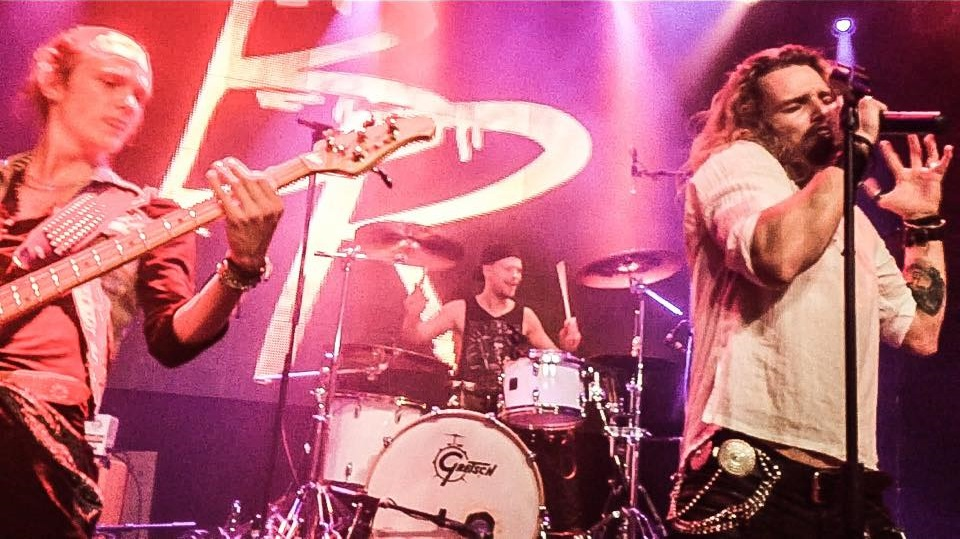
Bulletrain performing in 2014

Recordings

| Title | Album details |
|---|---|
| Johnny Gonebad (EP) | Released: 2007; Label: Independent |
| Turn it Up! (EP) | Released: 2009; Label: Independent |
| Even With My Eyes Closed (Single) | Released: 2013; Label: Independent |

Albums

| Title | Album details |
|---|---|
| Start Talking | Released: 2014; Label: Metal Heaven |
| What You Fear The Most | Released: 2016; Label: Metal Heaven |
