= Mimi Werner =

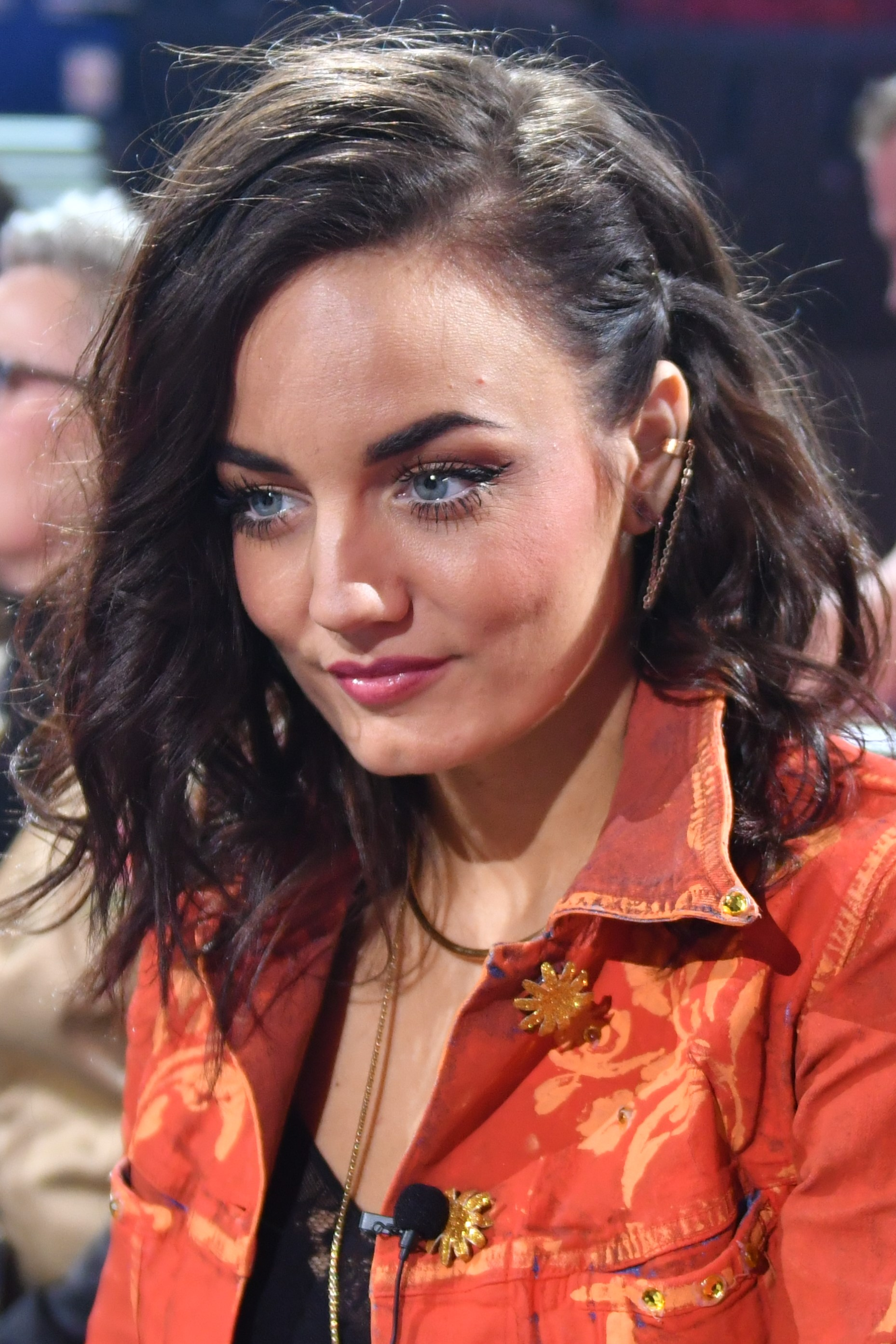
- Werner in 2018

Background information
- Born: Mimmi Michaela Sarah Werner; 17 December 1990 (age 35); Borås, Sweden
- Genres: Country pop; pop
- Occupations: Singer, songwriter
- Years active: 2013–present
- Label: BMG Scandinavia
- Website: mimiwerner.com

Mimmi Michaela Sarah Werner (born 17 December 1990), better known as Mimi Werner, is a Swedish singer and songwriter. Werner began her professional music career in 2015, after signing to BMG Scandinavia. She traveled to Nashville to begin writing music, and later released her debut single "Forever Again", an English version of the Swedish song "Strövtåg i hembygden" by Mando Diao.

Werner first achieved national recognition after being announced as a competitor in Melodifestivalen 2016, with the song "Ain't No Good", which became her most successful single to date. She competed in the first semi-final, held in Gothenburg on 6 February 2016, where she placed fifth and was eliminated. Her debut extended play "Here We Go Again" was released later that year. She also produced the single of the same name, featuring Swedish singer Brolle. Following Melodifestivalen 2016, Werner appeared on several Swedish television programs such as Bingolotto and Doobidoo. She later competed in Melodifestivalen 2018 with the song "Songburning", where she qualified to the second chance round.

== Discography ==
=== Extended plays ===
| Title | Details |
|---|---|
| "Here We Go Again" | Released: 8 April 2016; Label: BMG Scandinavia; Formats: Digital download |

=== Singles ===
| Title | Year | Peak chart positions | Album |
| Title | Year | SWE | Album |
|---|---|---|---|
| "Forever Again" (featuring Josh Jenkins) | 2015 | — | Here We Go Again |
| "Ain't No Good" | 2016 | 73 | Here We Go Again |
| "Here We Go Again" (featuring Brolle) | 2016 | — | Here We Go Again |
| "Where Will I Be" | 2016 | — | Here We Go Again |
| "Get Me Out of Goodbye" | 2016 | — | Here We Go Again |
| "Songburning" | 2018 | 91 | Non-album single |
