= Me and My Drum =

Single by Swingfly feat. Christoffer Hiding
- Released: 11 March 2011
- Genre: Pop, hip hop
- Label: EMI
- Songwriter(s): Teron Beal; Patrik Magnusson; Johan Ramström; Swingfly
- Producer(s): RamPac

"Me and My Drum" is a song by American-Swede rapper Swingfly featuring Christoffer Hiding and Beatrice Stars. The song was written by Teron Beal, Patrik Magnusson, Johan Ramström and Swingfly himself.

Swingfly (real name Ricardo DaSilva II), alongside Hiding and Stars performed it in the first semi-final of 4 semi-finals in Melodifestivalen 2011 on 5 February 2011 at the Coop Norrbotten Arena, Luleå coming second and proceeding to the finals on 12 March 2011 at the Globe Arena in Stockholm. He finished fifth overall.

The song was released one week before the final and proved popular making it to #10 in the Sverigetopplistan, the official Swedish Singles Chart and rising further up to #2. It was also certified platinum in Sweden.

== Charts ==
Chart (2011)	Peak position
Swedish Singles Chart	2
