= Live and Kicking (Eagle-Eye Cherry album) =

Live album by Eagle-Eye Cherry
- Released: 2007
- Genre: Rock
- Label: Indie Records
- Producers: Eagle-Eye Cherry, Mattias Torell

Eagle-Eye Cherry chronology
Sub Rosa (2003)	Live and Kicking (2007)	Can't Get Enough (2012)

Live and Kicking is a live album by Swedish musician Eagle-Eye Cherry released in Spring 2007. According to a letter posted by Cherry on his website, the album was released in Brazil in 2006.

The photograph appearing on the cover of the album was taken by Jessica and Andy Besirov during an Eagle-Eye Cherry gig in Hamburg, Germany. They also used the photo in their photography exhibition "Watch this Tune."

== Track listing ==
Track Listing
No.	Title	Writer(s)	Length
1.	"This Paralysis"	Cameron McVey, Paul Simm, Cherry
2.	"Been Here Once Before"	Klas Åhlund, Cherry
3.	"Falling in Love Again"	Cherry
4.	"Together"	Mattias Torell, Cherry
5.	"Don't Give Up"	Mattias Torell, Cherry
6.	"Feels So Right"	Mattias Torell, Cherry
7.	"Long Way Around"	Christopher "Preacher Boy" Watkins, Cherry
8.	"Comatose"	Kent Gillström Isaacs, Cherry
9.	"Shooting Up in Vain"	Cherry
10.	"Rainbow Wings"	Johan Carlberg, Cherry
11.	"Save Tonight"	Cherry
12.	"Are You Still Having Fun?"	Cherry
13.	"Promises Made"	Christopher "Preacher Boy" Watkins, Cherry
14.	"Comatose" (acoustic bonus track)	Kent Gillström Isaacs, Cherry
