= Körslaget 2008 =

- Körslaget 2009
- Körslaget 2009-contestants (date = knocked out)
- 2008
Joacim Cans	Winner

Körslaget 2008 was the first season of the Swedish TV entertainment program Körslaget, based on Clash of the Choirs and broadcast on TV4. The first season was shown in spring 2008 and consisted of eight sections, and from the second section, a choir was voted out in each section. The show premiered 29 March and the finale aired 10 May, which was won by Team Cans.

The show's host for the first season was Gry Forssell. Seven artists were commissioned to gather seven singers for their choirs from their respective home towns and compete with them against the other performers' choirs. No one was eliminated during the first episode. Instead, the votes for that episode were included in episode 2. Team Linda and Team Markoolio got the fewest votes. Eliminations started on the second episode. The first choir to be eliminated was Team Siw, led by Siw Malmkvist . Thereafter, the eliminations were (in order): Team Agnes, led by Agnes Carlsson, Team Markoolio, led by Markoolio, Team Linda, led by Linda Bengtzing and Team Lotta, led by Lotta Engberg. The winners were Team Cans, led by Joacim Cans and Team Brolle, led by Brolle were the runners-up.

== Contestants ==
- Joacim Cans With a choir from Mora - Winner
- Brolle With a choir from Boden - Eliminated 10 May
- Lotta Engberg With a choir from Laxå - Eliminated 3 May
- Linda Bengtzing With a choir from Gullspång - Eliminated 26 April
- Markoolio With a choir from Orminge - Eliminated 19 April
- Agnes Carlsson With a choir from Vänersborg - Eliminated 12 April
- Siw Malmkvist With a choir from Landskrona - Eliminated 5 April

=== Episode 1 ===
1. Team Linda - Like a Prayer (Madonna)
2. Team Siw - Bra Vibrationer (Kikki Danielsson)
3. Team Brolle - If I Could Turn Back Time (Cher)
4. Team Agnes - Big Girl (You Are Beautiful) (Mika)
5. Team Cans - You Give Love a Bad Name (Bon Jovi)
6. Team Lotta - Let's Twist Again (Chubby Checker)
7. Team Markoolio - Rock Your Body (Justin Timberlake)

Fewest votes

- Team Linda
- Team Markoolio

=== Episode 2 ===
1. Team Cans - We Will Rock You (Queen)
2. Team Lotta - Hooked on a Feeling (Björn Skifs)
3. Team Markoolio - Pride (In The Name Of Love) (U2)
4. Team Linda - You're the Voice (John Farnham)
5. Team Siw - Money, Money, Money, (ABBA)
6. Team Brolle - Suspicious Minds (Elvis Presley)
7. Team Agnes - I Am Outta Love (Anastacia)

Fewest Votes

- Team Siw
- Team Linda

=== Episode 3 ===
1. Team Agnes - It's Raining Men (The Weather Girls)
2. Team Cans - Love In An Elevator (Aerosmith)
3. Team Linda - Vi är på gång (Tomas Ledin)
4. Team Markoolio - I Want You Back (Jackson 5)
5. Team Lotta - "The Lion Sleeps Tonight" (The Tokens)
6. Team Brolle - It's My Life (Bon Jovi)

Fewst Votes

- Team Agnes
- Team Markoolio

=== Episode 4 ===
1. Team Markoolio - Värsta Schlagern (Linda Bengtzning och Markoolio)
2. Team Brolle - Watching The Stars (Brolle)
3. Team Linda - Hur svårt kan det va (Linda Bengtzning)
4. Team Lotta - La Det Swinge (Bobbysocks)
5. Team Cans - Hearts On Fire (Hammerfall)

Fewest votes

- Team Markoolio
- Team Linda

=== Episode 5 ===
Round 1

1. Team Lotta - Grease Lightning (Grease)
2. Team Cans - You Shook Me All Night Long (AC/DC)
3. Team Linda - Satellit (Ted Gärdestad)
4. Team Brolle - I Would Do Anything For Love (Meat Loaf)

Round 2

1. Team Lotta - Don't Worry Be Happy (Bobby McFerrin)
2. Team Brolle - Ring Of Fire (Johnny Cash)
3. Team Linda - Goodnight Sweetheart Goodnight (The McGuire Sisters)
4. Team Cans - O Fortuna (Carmina Burana)

Minst röster

- Team Linda
- Team Lotta

=== Episode 6 ===
Round 1

1. Team Cans - Pour Some Sugar On Me (Def Leppard)
2. Team Lotta - Thriller (Michael Jackson)
3. Team Brolle - Burning Love (Elvis Presley)

Round 2

1. Team Cans - Livin La Vida Loca (Ricky Martin)
2. Team Brolle - Eloise (Arvingarna)
3. Team Lotta - Run To The Hills (Iron Maiden)

Fewest Votes

- Team Lotta
- Team Cans

=== Program 7 (Final) ===
Round 1 (Own choice)

1. Team Brolle - Think (Aretha Franklin)
2. Team Cans - Bohemian Rhapsody (Queen)

Round 2 (Viewers choice)

1. Team Brolle - Suspicious Minds (Elvis Presley)
2. Team Cans - O Fortuna (Carmina Burana)

Round 3 (Shared Song)

1. Team Brolle - Livin on a prayer (Bon Jovi)
2. Team Cans - Livin on a prayer (Bon Jovi)

Winner:

- Team Cans

== Elimination chart ==
Finals
Weeks:		29 March	5 April	12 April	19 April	26 April	3 May	10 May
Place	Contestant	Result						
1	Joacim Cans	SAFE	SAFE	SAFE	SAFE	SAFE	Btm 2	Winner
2	Brolle	SAFE	SAFE	SAFE	SAFE	SAFE	SAFE	Runner-up
3	Lotta Engberg	SAFE	SAFE	SAFE	SAFE	Btm 2	ELIM	
4	Linda Bengtzing	Btm 2	Btm 2	SAFE	Btm 2	ELIM		
5	Markoolio	Btm 2	SAFE	Btm 2	ELIM			
6	Agnes Carlsson	SAFE	SAFE	ELIM				
7	Siw Malmqvist	SAFE	ELIM					
