= Popshop =

1998–2002 Swedish pop band

Popshop was a Swedish pop band established in Kalmar, Sweden in 1998. The members were Cornelia Dahlgren (on lead vocals), Patrik Magnusson and Johan Ramström (both on guitar), Jonas Hermansson (bass) and Micael Olofsson (drums).

The band released the album How to Tango, which contained collaborations with many renowned Swedish producers and songwriters, including Andreas Carlsson, Kent (Gillström) Isaacs, Dan Sundquist, Peter Boström and Joakim Udd and Leif Larsson. The album included a version of David Bowie's "Life on Mars" that was released as a single in 2002. The group broke up in 2002. Fellow members Patrik Magnusson and Johan Ramström continued working together as RamPac and working as a songwriting duo.

== Discography ==
=== Albums ===
- 2002: How to Tango

=== Singles ===
- 2001: "Careless"
- 2002: "Piece of Cake"
- 2002: "Life on Mars"
