= Körslaget =

- Created by: Friday TV
- Presented by: Gry Forssell
- Country of origin: Sweden
- No. of seasons: 7
- No. of episodes: 28

Production
- Running time: 2 hours

Original release
- Network: TV 4
- Release: 29 March 2008 – 19 October 2013

Körslaget (The Battle of Choirs) is a Swedish entertainment TV program on TV4. The format was developed by Friday TV and based on an idea from Caroline af Ugglas, Heinz Liljedahl and Patrik Hambraeus. A US version, Clash of the Choirs, was broadcast on NBC in December 2007.

In each season of Körslaget, seven known musicians from Sweden start their own choirs with 20 members in each. Each choir then performs one song in each program, and the audience then votes (either through a telephone call or SMS messaging) on the choir(s) they want to remain in the season. The team/choir with the fewest votes is eliminated in each program until one winning team remains; however, in the first program no team is eliminated. The winning team receives a certain amount of prize money to be donated to something in the city that the choir in question came from.

== Seasons ==
=== Season 1 ===
- Körslaget 2008: The winners were Team Cans, led by Joacim Cans; the runners-up were Team Brolle, led by Brolle.

=== Season 2 ===
- Körslaget 2008/09: The winners were Team Hanna, led by Hanna Hedlund; the runners-up were Team Erik led by Erik Segerstedt

=== Season 3 ===
- Körslaget 2009: The winners were Team Ola, led by Ola Svensson; the runners-up were Team Stefan led by Stefan Nykvist.

=== Season 4 ===
- Körslaget 2010: The winners were Team Moraeus, led by Kalle Moraeus; the runners-up were Team Picasso led by Marie Picasso.

=== Season 5 ===
- Körslaget 2011: The winners were Team Andreas, led by Andreas Johnson; the runners-up were Team Gabriel led by Gabriel Forss.

=== Season 6 ===
- Körslaget 2012, the sixth season, began on 8 September 2012, and is scheduled to end on 20 October 2012. The seven choir line-ups consist of Anders Bagge's Team Bagge, Martin Rolinski's Team Rolinski, Gladys del Pilar's Team Gladys, Lili & Susie's Team Lili & Susie, Putte Nelsson's Team Putte, Louise Hoffsten's Team Hoffsten, and Bengan Janson's Team Bengan.

=== Season 7 ===
- Körslaget 2013, the seventh season, began on 7 September 2013 and ended on 19 October 2013. The 7 choirs were led by the Swedish artists Sonja Aldén (7th), Dogge Doggelito (6th), Wille Crafoord (5th), Andreas Weise (4th), Rickard Söderberg(3rd), Anna Book (2nd) and Elisa Lindström (1st).
