= Live and Kicking =

Live and Kicking may refer to:

- Live & Kicking, a British children's show
- Live and Kicking (Australian TV program), a 1999 Australian-rules football variety program
- Live and Kicking (Eagle-Eye Cherry album)
- Live and Kickin' (Willie Nelson album), 2003
- Live 'n' Kickin' (West, Bruce and Laing album), live album
- Live 'n' Kickin' (Kingfish album)
- Live and Kicking, album by Nonpoint
- Live and Kicking, a 1991 live album by Skrewdriver

== See also ==
- Alive and Kicking (disambiguation)
