= Desireless (album) =

- UK and European cover art

Studio album by Eagle-Eye Cherry
- Released: 7 October 1997
- Length: 55:55
- Label: Diesel
- Producers: Eagle-Eye Cherry; Adam Kviman; Klas Åhlund; Kent Gillström; Magnus Frykberg

Eagle-Eye Cherry chronology
Desireless (1997)	Living in the Present Future (2000)

International artwork
- Alternative UK and European cover art, used internationally

Singles from Changing Faces
- 1. "Save Tonight" Released: 7 October 1997; 2. "When Mermaids Cry" Released: 13 February 1998; 3. "Falling in Love Again" Released: 20 June 1998; 4. "Permanent Tears" Released: 14 January 1999

Professional ratings
Review scores
Source	Rating
AllMusic	4/5 stars
Robert Christgau	B−
Rolling Stone	1.5/5 stars

Desireless is the debut album by Swedish singer Eagle-Eye Cherry, released on 7 October 1997.

The album went platinum in the United States and sold over four million copies worldwide. The singles "Save Tonight" and "Falling in Love Again" were a major part of the album's success. The title track, “Desireless” is a cover of a song by Cherry's late father Don Cherry from his album Relativity Suite.

== Track listing ==
All lyrics are written by Eagle-Eye Cherry; all music is composed by Eagle-Eye Cherry, except where noted.

No.	Title	Music	Producer(s)	Length
1.	"Save Tonight"		Adam Kviman; Eagle-Eye Cherry (co.)	3:55
2.	"Indecision"	Cherry; Klas Åhlund	Åhlund; Cherry (co.)	5:16
3.	"Comatose (In the Arms of Slumber)"	Cherry; Kent Gillström	Gillström; Cherry (co.)	4:38
4.	"Worried Eyes"		Magnus Frykberg; Kviman; Cherry (co.)	4:30
5.	"Rainbow Wings"	Cherry; John Carlberg	Kviman	4:04
6.	"Falling in Love Again"		Cherry	3:30
7.	"Conversation"		Gillström; Cherry (co.)	4:44
8.	"When Mermaids Cry"		Gillström; Cherry (co.)	4:22
9.	"Shooting Up in Vain"		Kviman; Cherry (co.)	5:36
10.	"Permanent Tears"		Kviman; Cherry (co.)	4:43
11.	"Death Defied by Will"		Kviman; Cherry (co.)	4:23
12.	"Desireless"	Don Cherry	Kviman; Eagle-Eye Cherry (co.)	6:14
Total length:				55:55

- Track information adapted from the album's liner notes.

== Personnel ==
Musicians

- Eagle-Eye Cherry – vocals, background vocals (1–3, 5, 6, 8–11), sampling (4), piano (4, 10, 12), acoustic guitar (6), programming (9), keyboards (10)
- Klas Åhlund – acoustic guitar (2, 10), electric guitar (1, 2, 9)
- Bengt Berger – tablas (12)
- Dilba Demirbağ – background vocals (4)
- Jaya Deva – acoustic guitar (10), guitar (4), vocals (12), electric guitar (12)
- Sharon Dyall – background vocals (7, 8)
- Andreas Fjällström – electric guitar (9)
- Peter Forss – bass guitar (2, 6, 8), background vocals (2, 6)
- Magnus Frykberg – drum programming (4, 8)
- Kent Gillström – acoustic guitar (3, 7), electric guitar (8), programming (8)
- Gnawan – guitar (4)
- Lars Halapi – acoustic guitar (8), electric guitar (8)
- Titiyo Jah – vocals (4)
- Goran Kajfes – trumpet (12)
- Dominic Keyes – percussion (2, 3, 6, 7), background vocals (2–4, 6, 7)
- Adam Kviman – acoustic guitar (9), Fender Rhodes (9)
- Niklas Medin – Hammond organ (3, 7)
- Elias Modig – bass guitar (1, 9–12)
- Vinia Mojica – background vocals (9)
- Sebastian Öberg – cello (10)
- Magnus Persson – drums (1–3, 6–12), sleigh bells (4), percussion (5, 12), didgeridoo (5), programming (10)
- Mattias Torell – acoustic guitar (1, 3, 5–8, 11, 12), electric guitar (1, 6–8, 11), guitar (2), bass guitar (3, 5, 7), additional arrangement (7)
- Ingemar Woody – electric guitar (11), additional arrangement (11)
- Alisha Zevulon – distant voice (10)

Technical personnel

- Adam Kviman – mixing (1, 3, 5, 7, 9, 11, 12), engineer (1, 4, 5, 9, 11, 12), additional drum engineering (3, 7)
- Kent Gillström – engineer (3, 7, 8), mixing (8)
- Ed Tuton – mixing (2, 5, 6), engineer (2, 5, 6)
- Simon Nordberg – vocal engineer (2)
- Stefan Glaumann – mixing (10)
- Magnus Frykberg – mixing (4), engineer (4)
- Robert Wellerfors – mixing (4), engineer (4)
- Ronny Lahti – additional recording
- Kaj Erixon – mixing (8)

== Charts ==
=== Weekly charts ===
Chart (1997–1999)	Peak position
Australian Albums (ARIA)	68
Austrian Albums (Ö3 Austria)	4
Belgian Albums (Ultratop Flanders)	32
Belgian Albums (Ultratop Wallonia)	48
Dutch Albums (Album Top 100)	31
European Albums (European Top 100 Albums)	5
Finnish Albums (Suomen virallinen lista)	30
French Albums (SNEP)	4
German Albums (Offizielle Top 100)	23
New Zealand Albums (RMNZ)	16
Norwegian Albums (VG-lista)	19
Swedish Albums (Sverigetopplistan)	2
Swiss Albums (Schweizer Hitparade)	4
UK Albums (Official Charts)	3
US Billboard 200	45

=== Year-end charts ===
Chart (1998)	Position
French Albums (SNEP)	22
German Albums (Offizielle Top 100)	61
UK Albums (OCC)	61

Chart (1999)	Position
US Billboard 200	153

== Certifications ==
Region	Certification	Certified units/sales
Canada (Music Canada)	Platinum	100,000^{^}
France (SNEP)	2× Gold	200,000^{*}
New Zealand (RMNZ)	Gold	7,500^{^}
Sweden (GLF)	Platinum	80,000^{^}
Switzerland (IFPI Switzerland)	Gold	25,000^{^}
United Kingdom (BPI)	Gold	100,000^{^}
United States (RIAA)	Platinum	1,000,000^{^}
Summaries
Europe (IFPI)	Platinum	1,000,000^{*}
Worldwide	—	4,000,000
^{*} Sales figures based on certification alone.^{^} Shipments figures based on certification alone.
