= 7 Days and 7 Nights =

Single by Brolle
- Released: 2011
- Genre: Pop rock
- Songwriter: Brolle

Brolle singles chronology
"Lovers Battlefield" (2010)	"7 Days and 7 Nights" (2011)

"7 Days and 7 Nights" is a song written by Brolle (Kjell Junior Wallmark) and performed by himself at the second semifinal of Melodifestivalen 2011 in Gothenburg. The song received the second highest vote in the semifinal (following Sanna Nielsen's "I'm In Love), and made it to the final inside the Stockholm Globe Arena where it ended up 10th with 29 points.

The song entered Svensktoppen on 27 March 2011 charting for four weeks before getting knocked out.

== Charts ==
Chart (2011)	Peak position
Sweden (Sverigetopplistan)	48
