= Can't Get Enough (Eagle-Eye Cherry album) =

Studio album by Eagle-Eye Cherry
- Released: October 5, 2012
- Genre: Rock
- Label: Vertigo
- Producer: Klas Åhlund

Eagle-Eye Cherry chronology
Live and Kicking (2007)	Can't Get Enough (2012)	Streets of You (2018)

Can't Get Enough is the fourth studio album released by Swedish musician Eagle-Eye Cherry in October 2012 by Vertigo Records.

== Track listing ==
Track Listing
No.	Title	Writer(s)	Length
1.	"Go Simmer Down"		3:14
2.	"Your Hero"		4:15
3.	"Walk Away"	Cameron McVey, Max Martin, Klas Åhlund, Cherry	2:50
4.	"Can't Get Enough"		3:06
5.	"Alone"		4:20
6.	"The Itch"		2:55
7.	"Feel This Way"		3:29
8.	"One In A Million"		3:47
9.	"Picture Me"	Max Martin, Klas Åhlund, Cherry	3:22
10.	"Living The Life"		3:44
11.	"Free"		2:00
12.	"Something"		5:27
13.	"You Kill Me (Everyday)"		2:52

Deluxe Version
No.	Title	Length
14.	"Running With the Dogs"	3:11
