= Are You Still Having Fun? =

2000 single by Eagle-Eye Cherry

Single by Eagle-Eye Cherry

from the album Living in the Present Future
- B-side: "Heaven"; "Momma Said Knock You Out"
- Released: 17 April 2000
- Studio: The Magic Shop; Sear Sound (New York City)
- Genre: Rock
- Label: Superstudio; Polydor
- Songwriter: Eagle-Eye Cherry
- Producer: Rick Rubin

Eagle-Eye Cherry singles chronology
"Permanent Tears" (1999)	"Are You Still Having Fun?" (2000)	"Long Way Around" (2000)

Music video
- "Are You Still Having Fun?" on YouTube

"Are You Still Having Fun?" is the first single released from Swedish singer Eagle-Eye Cherry's second studio album, Living in the Present Future (2000). The song was written by Cherry and produced by Rick Rubin. Issued on 17 April 2000, the single received warm reviews from critics and became Cherry's best-performing single since "Save Tonight", reaching the top 40 in 10 European countries, including Cherry's native Sweden, and peaking within the top 10 in three of them. It was not released in Canada or the United States. Several formats of the single contain a cover of LL Cool J's 1991 single "Mama Said Knock You Out, with "Mama" respelled as "Momma".

== Critical reception ==
Robert Sehlberg, head of music at P5 Radio Stockholm in Sweden, wrote that the song was more "grown-up" compared to Cherry's previous material. Music & Media magazine named the song their "Pick of the Week" on 25 March 2000, with Ville Vilén of Finnish radio station YLE Radiomafia claiming the song would please both men and women. On the same publication, Swiss Radio 105 head of music Matthias Völlm described the song as "great" but doubted its potential to become a number-one single, calling the track "pretty similar" to "Save Tonight" and "Falling in Love Again". Reviewing Living in the Present Future on AllMusic, Kelly McCartney also criticised the similarities the song shares with Cherry's earlier work, saying that it "fall[s] a little flat".

== Chart performance ==
"Are You Still Having Fun" was released as a single on 17 April 2000. Three days after the physical release, it debuted on the Swedish Singles Chart, where it peaked at number 18 and spent eight weeks on the chart. Throughout the rest of mid-2000, the single appeared on more mainland European charts, reaching the top 20 in Denmark, Finland, Italy, and Portugal while obtaining a peak of number 52 on the Eurochart Hot 100. In Iceland, it reached number five for three weeks in June 2000 and was the 11th-best-performing song of the year. It fared well in the United Kingdom, debuting and peaking at number 21 on the UK Singles Chart and spending six weeks in the top 100, and it also reached the top 40 in Ireland, where it topped off at number 39. Outside Europe, the track reached number 69 in Australia and number 41 in New Zealand.

== Track listings ==
Swedish CD single

1. "Are You Still Having Fun?" (album version) – 3:09
2. "Heaven" – 4:28

Scandinavian maxi-CD single

1. "Are You Still Having Fun?" (album version) – 3:09
2. "Are You Still Having Fun?" (Hallucinating Phontom mix) – 3:09
3. "Heaven" – 4:28
4. "Momma Said Knock You Out" (LP version) – 4:22

European CD single

1. "Are You Still Having Fun?" – 3:08
2. "Wishing It Was" (featuring Santana) – 4:18

European maxi-CD single

1. "Are You Still Having Fun?" – 3:08
2. "Wishing It Was" (featuring Santana) – 4:18
3. "Heaven" – 4:27
4. "Are You Still Having Fun?" (The Double the Fun mix) – 2:22

UK CD single

1. "Are You Still Having Fun?" – 3:08
2. "Momma Said Knock You Out" (LP version) – 4:22
3. "Are You Still Having Fun?" (The Double the Fun mix) – 2:22

== Credits and personnel ==
Credits are adapted from the Swedish CD single liner notes.

Studios

- Recorded at The Magic Shop and Sear Sound (New York City)
- Additional overdubs recorded at Cello Studios (Los Angeles, California)
- Mixed at Cello Studios (Los Angeles, California)

Personnel

- Eagle-Eye Cherry – writing, vocals, background vocals, co-production
- Dominic Keyes – background vocals, percussion
- Mattias Torell – guitar
- Preacher Boy – guitar
- Eric Schermerhorn – guitar
- Peter Fors – bass
- Magnus Persson – drums
- Rick Rubin – production, mixing
- David Shiffman – engineering
- Juan Garcia – second engineer
- Dave Fisher – second engineer
- John Sorenson – second engineer
- Greg Fidelman – digital editing
- Jim Scott – mixing
- Stephen Marcussen – mastering

== Charts ==
=== Weekly charts ===
Weekly chart performance for "Are You Still Having Fun?"
Chart (2000)	Peak position
Australia (ARIA)	69
Belgium (Ultratip Bubbling Under Flanders)	11
Denmark (IFPI)	8
Europe (Eurochart Hot 100)	52
Finland (Suomen virallinen lista)	17
France (SNEP)	37
Germany (GfK)	81
Iceland (Íslenski Listinn Topp 40)	5
Ireland (IRMA)	39
Italy (FIMI)	18
Italy Airplay (Music & Media)	1
Netherlands (Dutch Top 40 Tipparade)	7
Netherlands (Single Top 100)	79
New Zealand (Recorded Music NZ)	41
Portugal (AFP)	3
Scotland Singles (OCC)	14
Sweden (Sverigetopplistan)	18
Switzerland (Schweizer Hitparade)	31
UK Singles (OCC)	21

=== Year-end charts ===
Year-end chart performance for "Are You Still Having Fun?"
Chart (2000)	Position
Europe Border Breakers (Music & Media)	1
Iceland (Íslenski Listinn Topp 40)	11
