= Living in the Present Future =

Studio album by Eagle-Eye Cherry
- Released: 6 March 2000
- Genre: Rock
- Label: MCA
- Producer: Klas Åhlund; Eagle-Eye Cherry; The Dust Brothers; Adam Kviman; Rick Rubin

Eagle-Eye Cherry chronology
Desireless (1997)	Living in the Present Future (2000)	Sub Rosa (2003)

Singles from Living in the Present Future
- 1. "Are You Still Having Fun?" Released: 2000; 2. "Long Way Around" Released: 2000; 3. "Promises Made" Released: 2000; 4. "Feels So Right" Released: 2001

Professional ratings
Aggregate scores
Source	Rating
Metacritic	53/100
Review scores
Source	Rating
AllMusic	3/5 stars
BBC	(average)
Blender	2/5 stars
E! Online	C
Entertainment Weekly	B+
People	(mixed)
PopMatters	4/10 stars

Living in the Present Future is the second studio album by Swedish rock singer-songwriter Eagle-Eye Cherry. It was released in 2000. Cherry worked with such producers as The Dust Brothers, John Kurzweg, and Rick Rubin.

Four songs from the album were released as singles: "Are You Still Having Fun?", "Long Way Around", "Promises Made" and "Feels So Right". The only single to experience success across multiple regions was "Are You Still Having Fun?", which reached the top 40 in France, Sweden, Switzerland and the United Kingdom. "Long Way Around" became a minor hit in a few countries, but the following two singles did not make a commercial impact.

== Track listing ==
All songs written by Eagle-Eye Cherry. Co-writers credited as noted.

1. "Been Here Once Before" – 3:48 (Cherry, Klas Åhlund)
2. "Are You Still Having Fun?" – 3:11
3. "One Good Reason" – 3:26 (Cherry, Christopher Watkins)
4. "Promises Made" – 3:36 (Cherry, Watkins)
5. "Burning Up" – 5:02
6. "Together" – 5:30 (Cherry, Torrell)
7. "Long Way Around" featuring Neneh Cherry – 3:28 (Cherry, Watkins)
8. "Lonely Days (Miles Away)" – 3:59
9. "First to Fall" – 3:57
10. "Miss Fortune" – 3:47
11. "She Didn't Believe" – 3:41 (Cherry, Watkins)
12. "Shades of Gray" – 3:22 (Cherry, Watkins, Eric Schermerhorn)
13. "Wishing It Was" – 4:17 (Cherry, John King, Mike Simpson, M. Nishita. Bonus track not on European version; also appeared on Santana's 1999 release, Supernatural)

=== 2001 re-release ===
On 30 October 2001 the album was re-released with the title Present/Future. The new version replaced the tracks "First To Fall", "Miss Fortune" and "She Didn't Believe" with three new tracks (the single "Feels So Right" as well as "Crashing Down" and "Never Let You Down"), and slightly changed the order of the tracks. “Feels So Right” was also included on Cherry’s next album, Sub Rosa.

- All songs written by Eagle-Eye Cherry. Co-writers credited as noted.
1. "Been Here Once Before" – 3:48 (Cherry, Klas Åhlund)
2. "Are You Still Having Fun?" – 3:11
3. "One Good Reason" – 3:26 (Cherry, Christopher Watkins)
4. "Promises Made" – 3:36 (Cherry, Watkins)
5. "Feels So Right" – 4:20 (Cherry, Watkins, Mattias Torrell)
6. "Crashing Down" – 5:21 (Cherry, Watkins)
7. "Long Way Around" featuring Neneh Cherry – 3:28 (Cherry, Watkins)
8. "Lonely Days (Miles Away)" – 3:59
9. "Together" – 5:30 (Cherry, Torrell)
10. "Burning Up" – 5:02
11. "Shades of Gray" – 3:22 (Cherry, Watkins, Eric Schermerhorn)
12. "Never Let You Down" – 5:45
13. "Wishing It Was" – 4:17 (Cherry, John King, Mike Simpson, M. Nishita)

== Personnel ==
- Eagle-Eye Cherry - vocals, keyboards, piano
- Mats Asplen - Fender Rhodes electric piano, organ, Moog synthesizer
- Patrick Warren - Chamberlin
- Klas Åhlund, Eric Schermerhorn, Mattias Torrell, Christopher Watkins - acoustic and electric guitars
- Olav Gustaffson - pedal steel guitar
- Spencer Campbell, Peter Fors, Benny Rietveld - bass guitar
- Jim Bogios, Rodney Holmes, Magnus Persson - drums
- Dominic Keyes, Karl Perazzo, Raul Rekow - percussion
- Per "Texas" Johansson - saxophone
- Goran Kajfes - trumpet
- John Kurzweg - additional guitar

== Charts ==
=== Weekly charts ===
Chart (2000)	Peak position
Australian Albums (ARIA)	33
Austrian Albums (Ö3 Austria)	30
Finnish Albums (Suomen virallinen lista)	31
French Albums (SNEP)	10
German Albums (Offizielle Top 100)	23
Norwegian Albums (VG-lista)	30
Swedish Albums (Sverigetopplistan)	3
Swiss Albums (Schweizer Hitparade)	6
UK Albums (OCC)	12

=== Year-end charts ===
Chart (2000)	Position
Swiss Albums (Schweizer Hitparade)	62

== Certifications and sales ==
Region	Certification	Certified units/sales
Switzerland (IFPI Switzerland)	Gold	25,000^{^}
Summaries
Europe	—	250,000
^{^} Shipments figures based on certification alone.
