= Alive and Kicking =

Alive and Kicking may refer to:

== Business ==
- Alive & Kicking (social enterprise), an African social enterprise
- "Alive and kicking", a 1986–1997 advertising campaign for McEwan's Lager
- Alive and Kicking, Inc., a division of Cartoon Network Studios

== Film, theatre and television ==
- Alive and Kicking (1959 film), a British comedy directed by Cyril Frankel
- Alive and Kicking, US title of the British 1996 drama Indian Summer, directed by Nancy Meckler
- Alive and Kicking (2016 film), American documentary film about swing dancing, produced and directed by Susan Glatzer
- Alive and Kicking (musical), a 1950 Broadway musical revue
- Alive and Kicking (TV drama), a 1991 UK TV drama, starring Lenny Henry and Robbie Coltrane, produced for the anthology series Screen One
- Alive and Kicking (TV series), a 2021 Spanish television series (original title: Los espabilados)

== Music ==
- Alive 'N Kickin' or Alive and Kicking, U.S.-American pop group
- Alive & Kicking (Delfonics album), 1974
- Alive & Kicking (Nana Mizuki album), 2004
- Alive & Kicking (Nazareth album), 2003
- Alive & Kicking (Shaan album), 1992
- Alive and Kickin' (album), a 2006 album by Fats Domino
- "Alive and Kicking" (song), a 1985 song by Simple Minds
- "Alive and Kickin'", a song by Mr.Big from Lean into It
- "Alive and Kicking", a song by Nonpoint from To the Pain

== Other media ==
- Raving Rabbids: Alive & Kicking, a 2011 video game in the Raving Rabbids franchise
- Alive & Kicking, a 1996 book by Rolf Benirschke
- Alive and Kicking: My Journey Through Football, Addiction and Life, a 2011 memoir by Chester Marcol

== See also ==
- Alive and Cooking, an Australian television cooking show which aired from 2008 to 2017
- Live and Kicking (disambiguation)
