= The King (The Playtones song) =

Single by The Playtones

from the album Rock'n Roll Is King
- Released: 2011
- Genre: Dansband; rockabilly
- Songwriters: Peter Kvint, Fredrik Kempe

"The King" is a song written by Peter Kvint and Fredrik Kempe. The song was performed in the second semifinal of Melodifestivalen 2011 by The Playtones in the second semifinal in the town of Linköping. From there, it made it to the finals inside the Stockholm Globe Arena, where it ended up 6th.

The song charted at Svensktoppen for seven weeks. before leaving chart.

In 2011, the song was recorded by the Top Cats for the album Heartache.

== Charts ==
Chart (2011)	Peak position
Sweden (Sverigetopplistan)	34
