= Sara Varga =

Swedish vispop singer, songwriter

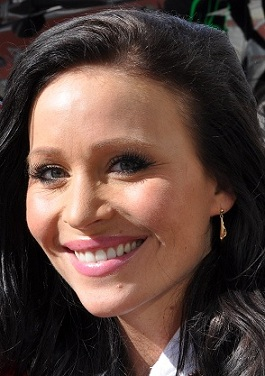
- Sara Varga

Background information
- Born: Sara Varga Madeleine Jonsson; 14 April 1982 (age 43); Stockholm, Sweden
- Genres: Vispop
- Occupations: Singer; songwriter; author; DJ
- Instrument: Vocals
- Years active: 2007–present
- Labels: Roxy

Sara Varga Madeleine Jonsson (born 14 April 1982), known professionally as Sara Varga, is a Swedish vispop singer, songwriter, author, and DJ.

In Summer 2010, Varga went on concert tour together with Swedish boy band Rebound!. In Autumn 2010 she was DJ in the 4th season of the TV-program Raw Comedy Club. Varga contested Melodifestivalen 2011 with the song "Spring för livet", which she wrote together with Figge Boström, and finished in ninth place. She participated again in Melodifestivalen 2017 with Juha Mulari with the song "Du får inte ändra på mig", however she did not qualify for the final.

== Bibliography ==
- Från groda till prins (2007)

== Discography ==
=== Albums ===
- Faith, Hope & Love (2008)
- Spring för livet (2011)
- Ett år av tystnad (2012)

=== Singles ===
- Always Have (2008)
- Du gick (2010)
- Spring för livet (2011)
