= Christoffer Hiding =

Swedish singer (born 1985)

Christoffer Hiding (born 25 December 1985 in Gothenburg but raised in Alingsås) is a Swedish singer who took part in the Swedish Idol 2007 finishing 6th place. His cover version of Nelly Furtado's "Say It Right" was a minor hit for him reaching #53 on the Swedish Singles Chart.

In 2011, Hiding took part in Melodifestivalen singing alongside Swingfly to the song "Me and My Drum" at the Globe Arena finals in Stockholm, coming 5th overall. Swingfly raps the verses, whereas Christoffer sings the chorus in the song. He released his debut music video for "Shine On" which is from his 2013 album, Yes, Higher!.

== Discography ==
=== Albums ===
- 2014: Yes, Higher!

=== Singles ===
- 2007: "Say It Right" – #53 Sweden
- 2012: "Shine On"

As featured artist

- 2011: "Me and My Drum" (Swingfly feat. Christoffer Hiding) – #3 Sweden
- 2011: "Little Did I Know" (Swingfly feat. Pauline and Christoffer Hiding)
