= Johan Ramström =

Swedish songwriter and composer

- Born: 17 December 1975 (age 49); Kalmar, Sweden
- Occupation: songwriter
- Member of: RamPac
- Formerly of: Popshop

Johan Ramström (born 17 December 1975), is a Swedish songwriter and composer.

Johan Ramström was born in Kalmar. He was a member of Popshop, a Swedish pop band founded in Kalmar in 1998 with members Cornelia Cassidy as lead singer, Patrik Magnusson (guitar), Micael Olofsson (drums), Jonas Hermansson (bass) and Johan Ramstrom (guitar). The band released How to Tango, collaborating with Swedish producers and songwriters Andreas Carlsson, Kent (Gillström) Isaacs, Dan Sundquist, Leif Larsson, Peter Boström and Joakim Udd. The band broke up in 2002.

After the break-up of the band, Ramström continued collaborating for many years with songwriter and bandmate Patrik Magnusson and the duo came together to be known as RamPac, co-written many songs for a number of artists including RBD, Swingfly, Teron Beal, Agnes Carlsson, Mick Mars, Crashdïet. Most notably, he has written a number of songs that competed in the Swedish Melodifestivalen competition, which is the selection process for representing Sweden in the Eurovision Song Contest.

In 2002, he composed "Sail Away" in partnership with Patrik Magnusson. It was sung by Annika Ljungberg.

In 2006, he wrote "La chica de la Copa" again with Patrik Magnusson and with the singer of the song for the Melodifestivalen competition Pablo Cepeda. Cepeda finished seventh that year.

In 2011 Ramström co-wrote "Me and My Drum" a song sung by Swingfly that came fifth overall. The song was a collaboration between Ramström, Swingfly, Teron Beal and Patrik Magnusson.
