= Lars-Åke Wilhelmsson =

Swedish entertainer

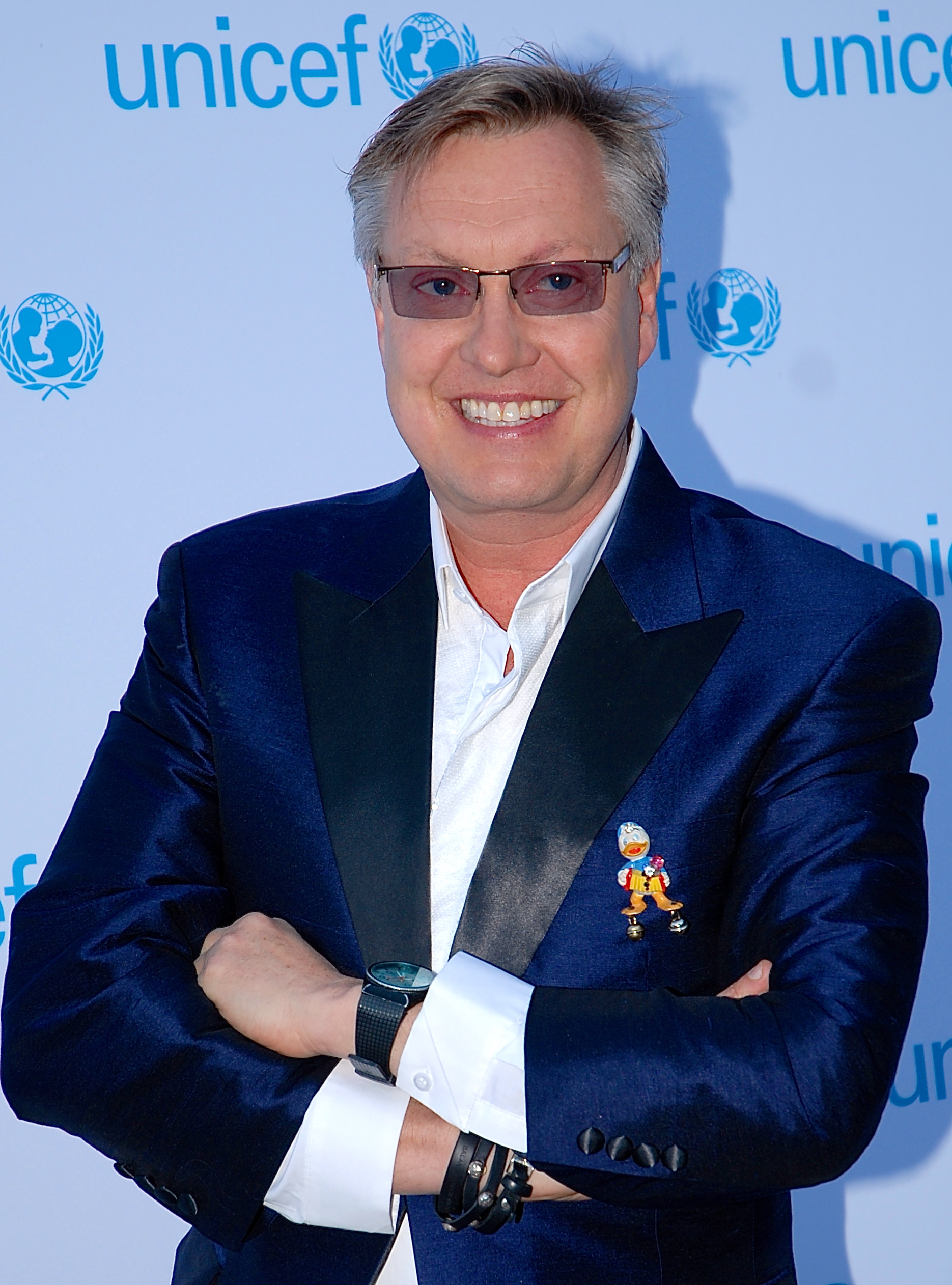
- Wilhelmsson at the UNICEF gala in Stockholm in May 2012
- Born: 8 September 1958 (age 67)
- Occupations: Fashion designer and drag artist
- Known for: Performances as the character Babsan

Lars-Åke Wilhelmsson (born 8 September 1958) is a Swedish fashion designer and drag artist. Mostly known for his performances as the character Babsan (IPA: [ˈbâbsan]), he was educated as a typographist and art director.

== Biography ==
Wilhelmsson was a successful ballroom dancer in his youth. In 1979, he formed a group of drag artists called Surprise Sisters along with friends. During the 1980s, he was often hired as a male striptease dancer, mostly at the nightclub Bacchi Wapen in Stockholm.

He has been awarded the Guldmasken award several times for his work as a designer due to his work with costumes for the musicals Rent, Wizard of Oz, Pippi Långstrump, Stars, Karlsson på taket and Grease. Wilhelmsson presented the bingo show Söndagsbingo at TV4 in 2002.

In 2007, he created the costumes for Nanne Grönvall in her role in the musical Sweet Charity. In the summer of 2007, he drew and designed the costumes for the musical Pippi Långstrump, directed by Staffan Götestam. Wilhelmsson designed the costumes for the entire ensemble of Sound of Music at Göta Lejon in 2007. On 9 July 2009, he presented an episode of the Sveriges Radio show Sommar i P1. He won a Guldmasken award for his work for the musical The Producers, and for Babben Larsson and Loa Falkman's costumes in the play Obesvarad kärlek in 2010.

He also made the costumes for his character Babsan when he performed in the After Dark show along with Christer Lindarw in 2013. He has also presented a few episodes of the Sveriges Radio late-night show Karlavagnen during the summer of 2014.

== Babsan ==
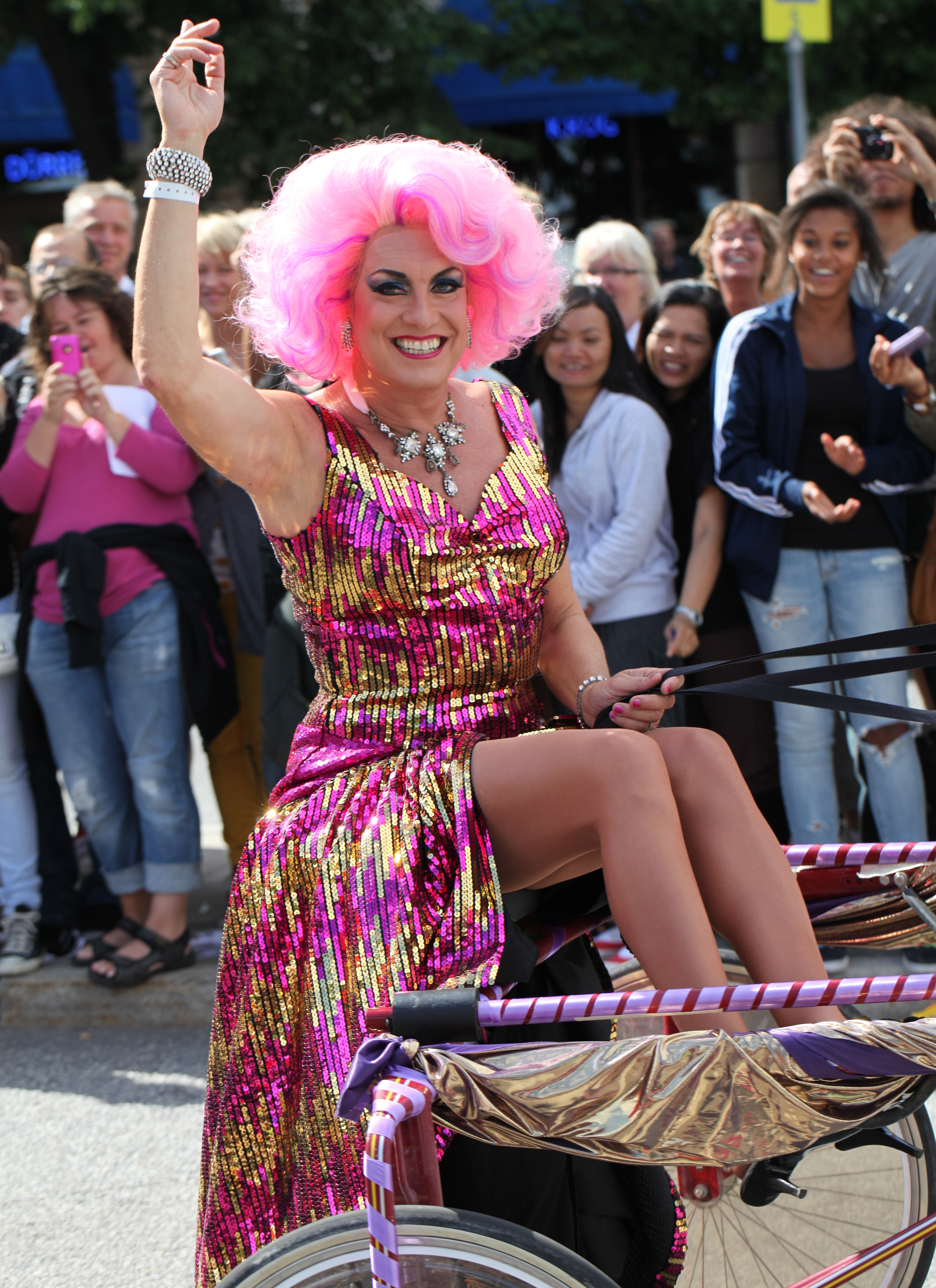
Babsan at Stockholm Pride in 2010

His first appearance as Babsan was for the television show Kullagret on SVT in 1986, under the stage name of Baby Doll Karlsson. When the character was due to appear in a live show on ZTV, the presenter Anders S. Nilsson forgot his name and instead called him Babsan and that name has been used ever since.

Babsan's character is of a happy, outspoken middle aged woman who uses glitter and glamour to make her days less boring. Part of the joke is that Babsan's husband, a taxi driver called Gunnar which the audience never gets to meet, is a very ordinary and boring man. Babsan made her TV debut as a recurring figure in the 1992 show Babbla med Babsan. The show also aired on TV3 during 1994 and 1996, giving her a total of three seasons and eight episodes. Babsan also appeared as a guest in the SVT teen comedy series En klass för sig in 2000. She is also a hostess at the gay-nights at the nightclub "Lady Patricia" in Stockholm.

In 2006, Babsan appeared in her own kids shows called Bubbla med Babsan and TV Myra respectively, both airing on TV4. In 2008 she appeared in every episode of Allsång på Skansen, and presented a webshow after each episode. And in one episode on SVT, she performed her own song called "Jetset Babsan".

In late 2009, Wilhelmsson appeared both as Babsan and as other characters in the After Dark Tour. A recorded version of the show aired on SVT on New Year's Eve in 2011.

In 2010, Babsan appeared in the kids game show Wild Kids during one of the missions for the kids. In 2011, she participated in Melodifestivalen with the song "Ge mig en spanjor", in the semi-final although the song was voted seventh out of eight songs and did not make the final.

== Filmography ==
- 2000: Jönssonligan spelar högt
- 2000: Once in a Lifetime

== Discography ==
- 1999 – Babsan på Rymmen / CD Park Studio Roger Krieg
- 2006 – Babsan önskar God Gala Jul Jonathan Hummerman
- 2007 – Babsan sjunger Zarah
- 2009 – Cabaret / CD

=== Singles ===
- 1999: "Jag är som jag är" / "I Am What I Am" – mix Emil Hellman
- 2006: "Heja på!"
- 2006: "Alltid lika vacker" (Studio GMP music single)
- 2008: "Babsan Jetset Lady" (with Thomas G)
- 2010: "Alla dessa Jular"
- 2011: "Ge mej en spanjor" (at Melodifestivalen 2011)
- 2012: "Han tror på mej"
- 2014: "Babsan heter jag"
