= The Playtones =

- Also known as: Previously, Boppin' Steve & The Playtones
- Origin: Kallinge, Sweden
- Genres: Rock n Roll; Rockabilly
- Years active: 2008–present

The Playtones is a Swedish band formed in 2008 in Kallinge which plays 1950s-style rock and roll. Their music is influenced by rockabilly. It was called Boppin' Steve & The Playtones before 2008.

The Playtones won the dansband competition Dansbandskampen in 2009. In 2011 the band appeared in Melodifestivalen, the Swedish preselection for the Eurovision Song Contest.

== Members ==
- Stefan Jonasson – vocals, piano
- Johan Svensson – drums
- Mattias Schertell – double bass, electric bass
- Jonas Holmberg - guitar

== Discography ==
=== Albums ===
As Boppin' Steve & The Playtones

Year	Album	Peak	Certification
Year	Album	SWE	Certification
2010	Mr Big	30	
2010	I'm on Fire	49	

As The Playtones

Year	Album	Peak	Certification
Year	Album	SWE	Certification
2010	Rock'n'Roll Dance Party	1	
2011	Rock'n Roll is King	1	
2012	Rock the Road	2	
2013	In the Mood	7	
2014	Rockabilly Sunset	3	
2015	It's Alright	20	

Others

- Rock'n'Roll Christmas Party

=== Singles ===
Year	Song	Peak	Certification	Album
Year	Song	SWE	Certification	Album
2011	"The King"	34		Rock'n Roll Is King
