= Ain't No Good =

Single by Mimi Werner
- Released: 6 February 2016
- Genre: Pop; country pop
- Length: 2:52
- Label: TinTinTune
- Songwriter(s): Mimi Werner; Göran Werner; Marcus Svedin; Jason Saenz

Mimi Werner singles chronology
"Forever Again" (2015)	"Ain't No Good" (2016)	"Here We Go Again" (2016)

"Ain't No Good" is a song by Swedish singer Mimi Werner. The song was released in Sweden as a digital download on 6 February 2016, and was written by Werner along with Göran Werner, Marcus Svedin, and Jason Saenz. Mimi Werner performed the song in Melodifestivalen 2016, and placed fifth in the first semi-final.

== Track listing ==
Digital download
No.	Title	Length
1.	"Ain't No Good"	2:52

== Chart performance ==
=== Weekly charts ===
Chart (2016)	Peak position
Sweden (Sverigetopplistan)	73

== Release history ==
Region	Date	Format	Label
Sweden	6 February 2016	Digital download	TinTinTune
