= Sub Rosa (album) =

Studio album by Eagle-Eye Cherry
- Released: 29 September 2003
- Genre: Alternative rock
- Length: 50:12
- Label: Polydor
- Producer: Al Stone; Cameron McVey; Paul Simm; Pete Davis; Klas Åhlund; Tim Simenon; John Kurzweg

Eagle-Eye Cherry chronology
Living in the Present Future (2000)	Sub Rosa (2003)	Live and Kicking (2007)

Professional ratings
Review scores
Source	Rating
musicOMH	(average) link
RTÉ.ie	link

Sub Rosa is the third studio album by Swedish singer-songwriter Eagle-Eye Cherry, released in September 2003 by Polydor Records. It reached the top 40 on the Swedish and Swiss charts. The song "Don't Give Up" was featured in the Disney film Holes.

== Track listing ==
No.	Title	Writer(s)	Producer(s)	Length
1.	"This Paralysis"	Eagle-Eye Cherry; Cameron McVey; Paul Simm	McVey; Simm; Pete Davis	4:07
2.	"Skull Tattoo"	Cherry; Klas Åhlund	Åhlund; Al Stone (add.)	3:22
3.	"The Strange"	Cherry; Christopher "Preacher Boy" Watkins	Stone	3:49
4.	"Up to You"	Cherry	Stone	3:38
5.	"Don't Give Up"	Cherry; Mattias Torell	McVey; Davis	3:57
6.	"How Come"	Cherry; Eric Schermerhorn; Watkins	Tim Simenon	4:11
7.	"Feels So Right"	Cherry; Torell	John Kurzweg	4:19
8.	"Crashing Down"	Cherry; Schermerhorn; Watkins	Kurzweg	5:05
9.	"Twisted Games"	Cherry	Stone	3:27
10.	"The Food Song"	Cherry; McVey; Simm; Jeremy Shaw	McVey; Davis	4:19
11.	"If It Can't Be Found"	Cherry; Torell	Stone	4:52
12.	"If You Don't Know by Now"	Cherry; Schermerhorn	Stone	5:06
Total length:				50:12

Japanese bonus tracks
No.	Title	Writer(s)	Producer(s)	Length
13.	"No Parade"	Cherry; Watkins	Kurzweg	5:45
14.	"Never Let You Down"	Cherry	Stone	3:53

== Charts ==
Chart (2003)	Peak position
French Albums (SNEP)	53
Swedish Albums (Sverigetopplistan)	40
Swiss Albums (Schweizer Hitparade)	31
