= Körslaget 2010 =

- Körslaget 2010-contestants (Date is for the night of elimination)
- 2010
| Kalle Moraeus | Winner |
| Marie Picasso | 1 May |
| Rongedal | 24 April |
| Niklas Strömstedt | 17 April |
| Morgan "Mojje" Johansson | 10 April |
| Linda Sundblad | 3 April |
| Ralf Gyllenhammar | 27 March |

Körslaget 2010 is the fourth season of TV4's entertainment show Körslaget. It premiered on 20 March 2010. A feature of this season was Gabriel Forss's comment on each performance, and a choir was led by two contestants, Team Rongedal. It was also the first season to be aired on TV4 HD.

== Contestants ==
- Niklas Strömstedt with a choir from Växjö
- Marie Picasso with a choir from Västerås
- Morgan "Mojje" Johansson with a choir from Visby
- Kalle Moraeus with a choir from Orsa
- Linda Sundblad with a choir from Lidköping
- Ralf Gyllenhammar with a choir from från Mölnlycke
- Rongedal with a choir from Karlstad

=== Episode 1 ===
Aired 20 March

1. Team Rongedal - This Love (Maroon 5)
2. Team Mojje - I Gotta Feeling (The Black Eyed Peas)
3. Team Picasso - We Built This City (Starship)
4. Team Strömstedt - God Only Knows (Beach Boys)
5. Team Sundblad - Wannabe (Spice Girls)
6. Team Gyllenhammar - Fox on the Run (Sweet)
7. Team Moraeus - Jag såg i öster (Folkmusik)

==== Results ====
Lowest number of votes
| Team Sundblad | Team Strömstedt |

Highest number of votes
Team Moraeus

No choir was eliminated

=== Program 2 ===
Aired 27 March

1. Team Picasso - Proud Mary (Tina Turner)
2. Team Strömstedt - Turn, Turn, Turn (The Byrds)
3. Team Gyllenhammar - I love it loud (Kiss)
4. Team Sundblad - Girls just wanna have fun (Cyndi Lauper)
5. Team Mojje - Fireflies (Owl City)
6. Team Moraeus - Klinga mina klockor (Benny Andersson)
7. Team Rongedal - Somebody to love (Queen)

==== Elimination ====
The Choir with the darkest shade of gray was eliminated.

Lowest number of votes
| Team Gyllenhammar | Team Rongedal |

=== Episode 3 ===
Aired 3 April

1. Team Strömstedt - Om (Niklas Strömstedt)
2. Team Sundblad - Let's Dance (Linda Sundblad)
3. Team Rongedal - Just a minute (Rongedal)
4. Team Moreus - Underbart (Kalle Moraeus)
5. Team Picasso - This moment (Marie Picasso)
6. Team Mojje - Var ligger landet där man böjer bananerna (Morgan (Mojje) Johansson)

==== Elimination ====
The Choir with the darkest shade of gray was eliminated.

Lowest number of votes
| Team Sundblad | Team Picasso |

== Elimination chart ==
Finals
| Weeks: | | 3/20 | 3/27 | 4/3 | 4/10 | 4/17 | 4/25 | 5/1 |
| Place | Contestant | Result | | | | | | |
| 1 | Kalle Moraeus | 1st | 1st | SAFE | SAFE | 1st | 1st | Winner |
| 2 | Marie Picasso | SAFE | SAFE | Btm 2 | 1st | SAFE | Btm 2 | Runner-up |
| 3 | Rongedal | SAFE | Btm 2 | 1st | SAFE | Btm 2 | ELIM | |
| 4 | Niklas Strömstedt | Btm 2 | SAFE | SAFE | Btm 2 | ELIM | | |
| 5 | Morgan Johansson | SAFE | SAFE | SAFE | ELIM | | | |
| 6 | Linda Sundblad | Btm 2 | SAFE | ELIM | | | | |
| 7 | Ralf Gyllenhammar | SAFE | ELIM | | | | | |
