= Putte Nelsson =

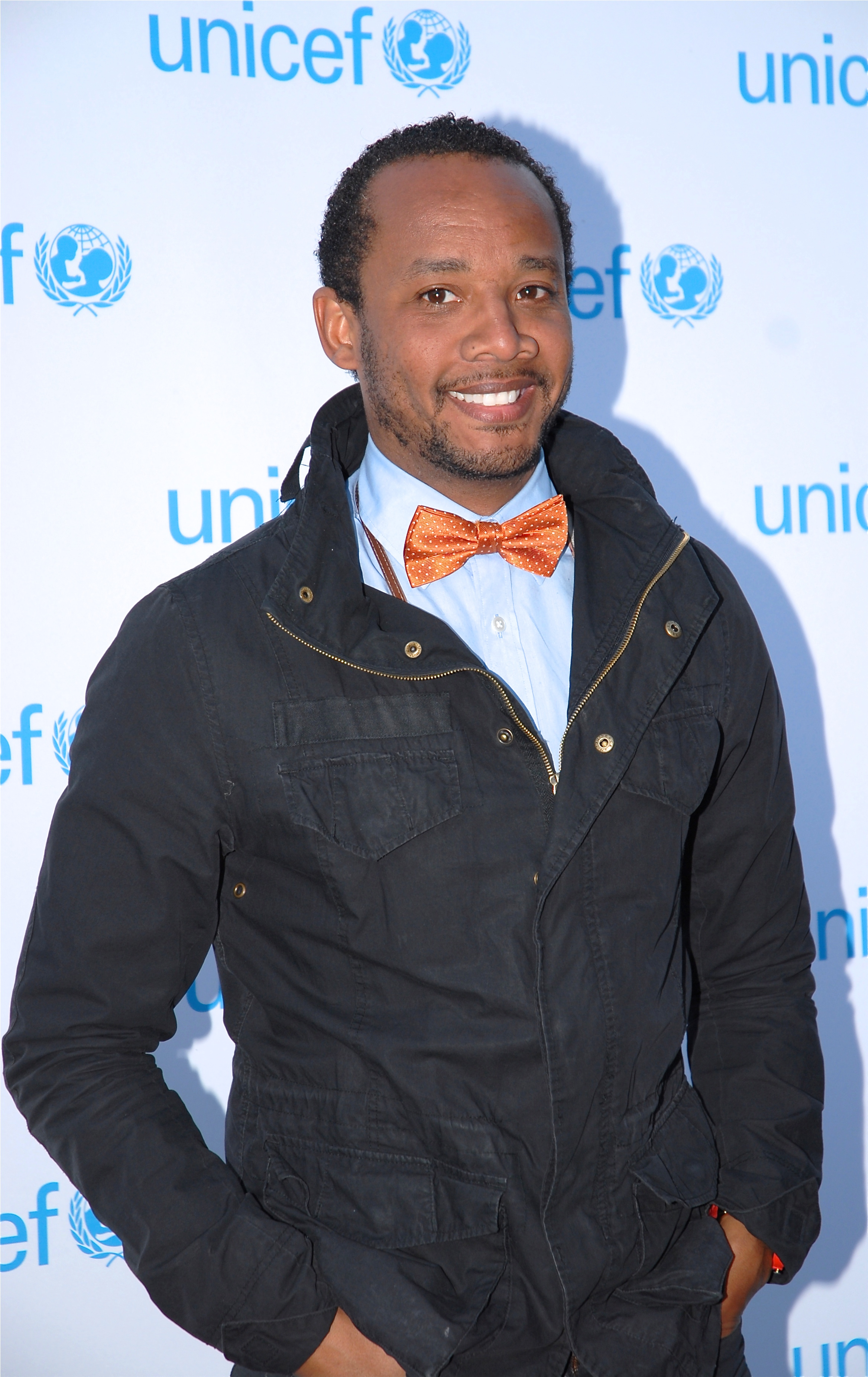
- Putte Nelsson in 2012

Background information
- Instruments: piano and vocals
- Formerly of: Blacknuss

Per Fredrick Dawit "Putte" Nelsson, (born 5 December 1971) is a Swedish pianist and songwriter. He is best known for his work on the SVT show Så ska det låta, winning the choir show Körslaget on TV4, and playing the piano during performances by several well-known international performers.

== Early life ==
Putte Nelsson grew up in Umeå and Vetlanda and moved to Stockholm in 1992. He is the adopted son of Roland Nelsson the former CEO of Erikshjälpen, and Gudrun Nelsson. Between 2000 and 2008, he was a member of the music collective Blacknuss.

== Work ==
Nelsson started to freelance as a pianist and keyboardist in 1996 for different events and became a known name in the music industry. He writes and produces music and was the creator of the song "Äntligen" with Fre performed for Melodifestivalen 2004. He has worked with several Swedish singers and performers such as Carola Häggkvist, Jerry Williams, Lisa Nilsson, Eric Gadd and Dr Alban. He has also backed up international performers including Ricky Martin, Mariah Carey, Craig David, and Mary J Blige.

He is perhaps best known as the team leader for one of the two competing teams on the SVT show Så ska det låta between 2006 and 2010. In September 2006, Nelsson won the television award Kristallen (The Crystal), along with the rest of the cast of Så ska det låta, in the category TV-show of the Year. Between 2010 and 2012 Nelsson was the band leader when Robert Gustafsson celebrated his 25 years in the business; the show was played over 240 times at Rondo in Gothenburg, Admiralen in Malmö and Cirkus in Stockholm.

In 2006, Nelsson and Lasse Axelsson founded Sjung NU, a project that combines singing lessons and participation in a choir, in Stockholm. The first year the choir had 600 people join the classes; by 2012 this number had grown to over a 1,000.

In November 2017, Nelsson celebrated ten years working with choirs with two sold-out concerts at Berwaldhallen.

Putte Nelsson and his choir won the 2012 season of Körslaget, a TV competition for celebrity-led choirs, which was broadcast on TV4.
