= Spring för livet =

Single by Sara Varga

from the album Spring för livet
- Released: 2011
- Songwriters: Fredrik Boström, Sara Varga

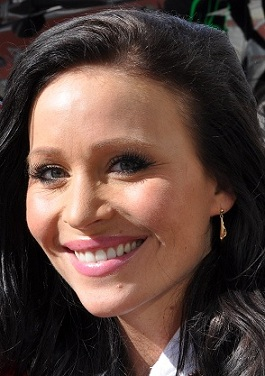
Sara Varga performed the song at Melodifestivalen 2011.

"Spring för livet" (English: "Run for Your Life") is a 2011 song written by Fredrik Boström and Sara Varga, and performed by Sara Varga at Melodifestivalen 2011, during the third semifinal in Linköping, where the song reached Andra chansen, and later the final, ending up 9th. It also charted at Svensktoppen for 35 weeks. The song's lyrics gained attention for its depiction of abuse, serving as a contrast to the less serious topics common at Melodifestivalen.

== Contributors ==
- Fredrik Boström - bass, programming, Rhodes, percussion, guitar, producer
- Janne Robertsson - drums
- Lars Hägglund - drums
- Jesper Nordenström - piano
- Mattias Bylund - organ
- Mija Folkesson - vocals

== Charts ==
Chart (2011)	Peak position
Sweden (Sverigetopplistan)	4
