= Patrik Magnusson =

Swedish songwriter

- Born: 17 March 1970 (age 55); Öland, Sweden
- Occupation: songwriter
- Member of: RamPac
- Formerly of: Popshop

Patrik Magnusson, born Öland, Sweden, on 17 March 1970) is a Swedish songwriter.

Patrik Magnusson was a member of Popshop, a Swedish pop band founded in Kalmar in 1998 with members Cornelia Cassidy as lead singer, Johan Ramström (guitar), Micael Olofsson (drums), Jonas Hermansson (bass) and Johan Ramstrom (guitar). The band released How to Tango collaborating with Swedish producers and songwriters Andreas Carlsson, Kent (Gillström) Isaacs, Dan Sundquist, Leif Larsson, Peter Boström and Joakim Udd. The band broke up in 2002.

After the break-up of the band, Ramström continued collaborating for many years with songwriter and bandmate Patrik Magnusson and the duo came together to be known as RamPac, co-written many songs for a number of artists including RBD, Swingfly, Teron Beal, Agnes Carlsson, Mick Mars, Crashdïet. Most notably, he has written a number of songs that competed in the Swedish Melodifestivalen competition, which is the selection process for representing Sweden in the Eurovision Song Contest.

In 2002, he composed "Sail Away" in partnership with Johan Ramström. It was sung by Annika Ljungberg.

In 2006, he wrote "La chica de la Copa" again with Johan Ramström and with the singer of the song for the Melodifestivalen competition Pablo Cepeda. Cepeda finished seventh that year.

In 2011 Ramström co-wrote "Me and My Drum" a song sung by Swingfly that came fifth overall. The song was a collaboration between Magnusson, Swingfly, Teron Beal and Johan Ramström.
