= RamPac =

Swedish music writing and producing team

- Origin: Sweden
- Genres: Pop
- Years active: 2002 – present
- Members: Patrik Magnusson; Johan Ramström
- Website: www.rampac.se

RamPac is a Swedish music writing and producing team made up of Johan Ramström born on 17 December 1975) and Patrik Magnusson (born in Öland on 17 March 1970). The duo team is based in Stockholm and has been working together since 2002.

Both Magnusson and Ramström were band members and fellow guitarists in the successful Swedish pop group Popshop alongside Cornelia Dahlgren (on lead vocals), Jonas Hermansson (bass) and Micael Olofsson (drums) from 1998 until 2002 when the group split up.

RamPac have written (co-written) and produced for a number of artists including Swingfly, Crashdïet, Mick Mars, Nervo, Teron Beal, Andreas Carlsson, Jörgen Elofsson and others.

They also wrote for Melodifestivalen entries on three occasions. In 2002, they composed "Sail Away" for Annika Ljungberg, in 2006 "La chica de la Copa" for Pablo Cepeda and in 2011 "Me and My Drum" for Swingfly that came fifth overall. The song was a collaboration between Ramström, Magnusson, Swingfly and Teron Beal. In the end of 2011 RamPac produced the theme music for the Swedish Hamilton movie I nationens intresse

== Compositions / Productions ==
- 2002: Annika Ljungberg - "Sail Away"
- 2004: RBD - "Fuego"
- 2005: Bad Candy
- 2005: Nordman - "Ödet var min väg"
- 2007: Tristan - The Borderline Generation
- 2008: Zididada - Take It All
- 2009: Swingfly - God Bless the IRS
- 2009: Teron Beal - Dance At My Funeral
- 2010: Crashdïet - Generation Wild
- 2011: Swingfly - Awesomeness
- 2011: Robert Pettersson feat Helena Josefsson - My Own Worst Enemy
