= Eagle-Eye Cherry =

Swedish musician (born 1968)

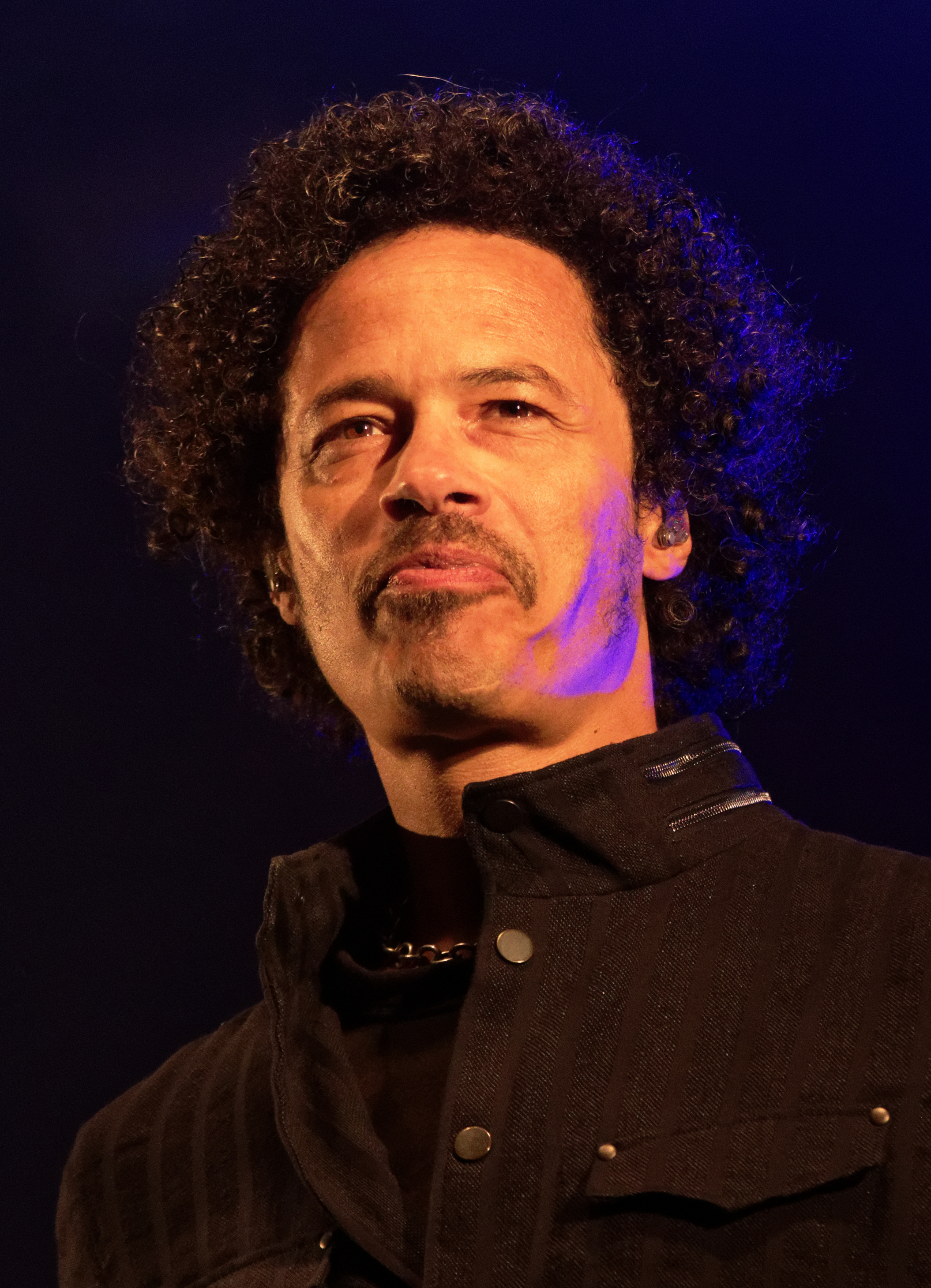
- Cherry in 2019

Background information
- Born: Eagle-Eye Lanoo Cherry; 7 May 1968 (age 58); Stockholm, Sweden
- Genres: Rock; Soul; alternative rock; acoustic; pop rock
- Occupations: Singer; musician
- Instruments: Vocals; guitar; keyboards; drums
- Years active: 1990–2003; 2010–present
- Labels: MCA; Diesel; Sony
- Website: www.eagleeyecherry.com

Eagle-Eye Lanoo Cherry (born 7 May 1968) is a Swedish singer and stage performer. His 1997 single "Save Tonight" achieved commercial success in Ireland, the United States, and the United Kingdom. Cherry is the son of American jazz artist Don Cherry and Swedish artist and designer Moki Cherry.

He pursued acting during high school, though Cherry's acting career was eventually set aside as his musical career took precedence in his life with his debut album Desireless (1997). He has released several other albums, has co-written for other artists and films, and has guest-starred on reality television. Cherry's music is of the acoustic, rock, post-grunge and alternative rock genres.

He is a native speaker of both English and Swedish.

== Early life ==
Cherry was born on 7 May 1968, in Stockholm, Sweden, the son of American jazz artist Don Cherry and Swedish painter/textile artist Monika Cherry (née Karlsson). Of Choctaw descent through his paternal grandmother and African-American through his grandfather, Cherry is the fourth of five siblings. He is the half-brother of singer Neneh Cherry (his mother's daughter with Ahmadu Jah). Other half-siblings are violinist Jan Cherry, Christian Cherry, and jazz musician David Ornette Cherry. At the age of 12, Cherry was sent to school in New York City. He remained there to work as an actor and a drummer in various bands. At 16, he enrolled in the High School of Performing Arts in New York in the same class as Jennifer Aniston and Chaz Bono.

== Career ==
In 1988, Cherry was credited as "Teenager" in the film Arthur 2: On the Rocks. In 1989, he was credited as "Vet #1" in Born on the Fourth of July. In 1993, he starred on the short-lived NBC action/adventure television show South Beach.

Cherry's father died in 1995. He returned to Stockholm to focus on his music rather than an acting career. He began writing and recording his debut album, Desireless, in his bedroom studio on an acoustic guitar. According to manager Tommy Manzi, Cherry's perfectionism made him keep the recordings under wraps until the album was virtually complete. The album became a commercial success throughout the world. Desireless sold four million copies worldwide and was certified platinum in the United States.

Cherry co-wrote and sang on "Wishing It Was" on Santana's 1999 album Supernatural, as well as in films such as Wim Wenders' The Soul of a Man, Y tu mamá también, The Love of the Game, GO, Best Laid Plans, Holes, and Over Her Dead Body. Some of his best-known songs include "Save Tonight", "Falling in Love Again", "Are You Still Having Fun?", "Long Way Around", "Feels So Right", "Skull Tattoo" and "Don't Give Up".

On 27 November 2012, he appeared as musical guest on The Voice of Romania. His fifth album, Streets of You, was released on 26 October 2018.

== Discography ==
=== Studio albums ===
List of studio albums, with selected chart positions, sales figures and certifications
Title	Album details	Peak chart positions										Certifications
Title	Album details	SWE	AUS	AUT	FRA	GER	NL	NZ	SWI	UK	US	Certifications
Desireless	Released: 21 July 1997; Label: Superstudio / Polydor; Formats: Cassette, CD, digital download, LP	2	68	4	4	23	31	16	4	3	45	GLF: Platinum; BPI: Gold; IFPI SWI: Gold; RIAA: Platinum; RMNZ: Gold; SNEP: 2× Gold
Living in the Present Future	Released: 6 March 2000; Label: Superstudio / Polydor; Formats: Cassette, CD, digital download, LP	3	33	30	10	23	—	—	6	12	—	IFPI SWI: Gold
Sub Rosa	Released: 29 September 2003; Label: BMG / RCA / Polydor; Formats: Cassette, CD, digital download, LP	40	—	—	53	—	—	—	31	—	—	
Can't Get Enough	Released: 5 October 2012; Label: Vertigo; Formats: CD, digital download, LP	—	—	—	—	—	—	—	—	—	—	
Streets of You	Released: 26 October 2018; Label: Papa Cherry; Formats: CD, digital download	—	—	—	172	—	—	—	—	—	—	
Back on Track	Released: 27 January 2023; Label: Papa Cherry; Formats: CD, digital download, LP	—	—	—	—	—	—	—	—	—	—	
Become a Light	Released: 26 September 2025; Label: Papa Cherry; Formats: CD, digital download, LP	—	—	—	—	—	—	—	—	—	—	
"—" denotes releases that did not chart

=== Live albums ===
List of live albums
Title	Album details
Live and Kicking	Released: 2007; Formats: Cassette, CD, digital download, LP

=== Singles ===
List of singles as main artist, with selected chart positions and certifications
Title	Year	Peak chart positions										Certifications	Album
Title	Year	SWE	AUS	FRA	GER	IRE	NL	NZ	SWI	UK	US	Certifications	Album
"Save Tonight"	1997	2	20	11	18	3	9	35	7	6	5	GLF: Platinum; ARIA: Gold; BPI: 2× Platinum; BVMI: Gold; RMNZ: 3× Platinum	Desireless
"When Mermaids Cry"	1998	34	—	—	—	—	—	—	—	—	—		Desireless
"Falling in Love Again"	1998	—	—	48	81	23	70	—	—	8	—		Desireless
"Permanent Tears"	1999	—	—	—	—	—	—	—	—	43	—		Desireless
"Are You Still Having Fun?"	2000	18	69	37	81	39	79	41	31	21	—		Living in the Present Future
"Long Way Around" (featuring Neneh Cherry)	2000	—	—	60	85	—	81	—	45	48	—		Living in the Present Future
"Promises Made"	2000	—	—	—	—	—	—	—	—	—	—		Living in the Present Future
"Feels So Right"	2001	—	—	—	—	—	—	—	—	—	—		Present/Future and Sub Rosa
"Skull Tattoo"	2003	54	—	—	—	—	99	—	64	158	—		Sub Rosa
"Don't Give Up"	2003	—	—	—	—	—	—	—	—	—	—		Sub Rosa
"Can't Get Enough"	2012	—	—	—	—	—	—	—	—	—	—		Can't Get Enough
"As One" (with Tomas Ledin)	2012	—	—	—	—	—	—	—	—	—	—		non-album track
"Dream Away" (with Darin)	2014	30	—	—	—	—	—	—	—	—	—	GLF: Platinum	non-album track
"Save Tonight" (2018 Rendition)	2018	—	—	—	—	—	—	—	—	—	—		non-album track
"Streets of You"	2018	—	—	—	—	—	—	—	—	—	—		Streets of You
"While Away"	2018	—	—	—	—	—	—	—	—	—	—		Streets of You
"I Like It"	2021	—	—	—	—	—	—	—	—	—	—		Back on Track
"—" denotes releases that did not chart

==== Featured singles ====
List of singles as featured artist
Title	Year	Album
"Get Up" (Thomas Gold featuring Eagle-Eye Cherry)	2019	Non-album single

== Filmography ==
=== Film ===
Year	Title	Role	Notes
1988	Arthur 2: On the Rocks	Teenager	
1989	Born on the Fourth of July	Vet #1	
1991	The Doors	Roadie	
2006	White Trash	Samir	
2018	Lyckligare kan ingen vara	Mark	

=== Television ===
Year	Title	Role	Notes
1988	ABC Afterschool Special	Various	Episode: "Date Rape"
1989	Runaway	Companion	Television film
1989	Livin' Large	Billy	Television film
1990	The Days and Nights of Molly Dodd	Thelonius the Musician	Episode: "Here Are Just a Few Things That Could Possibly Go Wrong"
1990	The Cosby Show	Guy #2	Episode: "Just Thinking About It"
1991	The Hit Man	Billy	Television film
1993	South Beach	Vernon	5 episodes
