= Swingfly =

American rapper

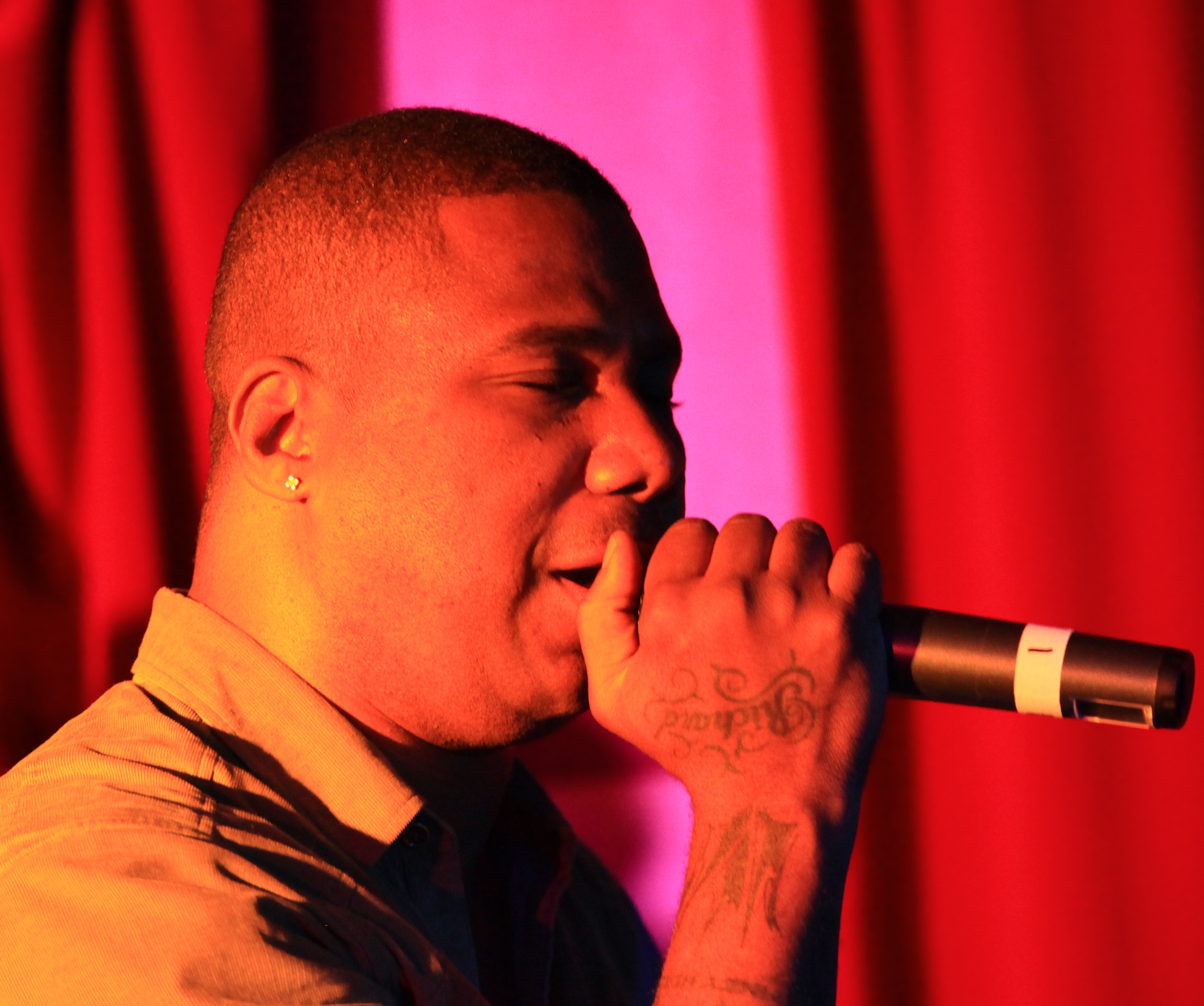

Background information
- Born: New York City, New York, US
- Origin: Stockholm, Sweden
- Genres: Hip hop; alternative rock; electronic
- Occupations: Rapper; singer
- Years active: 1991–present
- Labels: EMI Sweden; Dolores

Ricardo DaSilva II, better known by his stage name Swingfly, is an American–Swedish naturalised rapper and singer. He is also known by other aliases like Swing-Fly, Richie Pasta and Swing. He started lending his vocal talents to other artists' records, but has also developed also a solo career. He also appeared in Melodifestivalen 2011 with "Me and My Drum", finishing fifth. It became his most successful single, reaching the No. 2 position on the Swedish Singles Chart.

== Early career ==
Ricardo DaSilva II was born in New York. He lived in Trinidad and Tobago and Panama before relocating to Stockholm, Sweden in 1991. In Stockholm, he became involved in the emerging hip hop scene and joined the Timebomb collective, together with producer Christian Falk, rapper ADL, and DJ Sleepy among others. Three singles were released, including Swingfly's "Smoke 'em Swing", a jazzy number produced by Christian Falk. A series of albums was planned but the record label bailed out.

Under the name "Swing", he teamed up with Dr. Alban in 1995 and recorded the Euro-disco hit "Sweet Dreams", featuring Dr. Alban (a cover of the classic Eurythmics song), which peaked at No. 12 in Sweden. This took him into the pop charts in a number of European countries, including the Netherlands, where the single peaked at No. 44.

In 1996, Swingfly appeared on several tracks of ADL's "Absent Minded" project. Due to a small hit via a Hugo Boss commercial, "Absent Minded" hit the road supporting the Fugees European tour in 1996. Swingfly was featured on several tracks on all three albums with soul-jazz collective Blacknuss All-Stars (later known as Blacknuss), as well as being a frequent contributor to their live shows around Europe and the UK.

He achieved his biggest success through a collaboration with the electro/dub/punk trio Teddybears on their 2004 single "Hey Boy". This song became one of the most played tracks on Swedish radio that summer. The song was listed for 21 weeks on the Sweden Singles Top 60 and peaked at #13. Swingfly has since toured Sweden, Europe and the US with Teddybears and their spin-off project Teddybears STHLM Soundsystem.

== Solo career ==
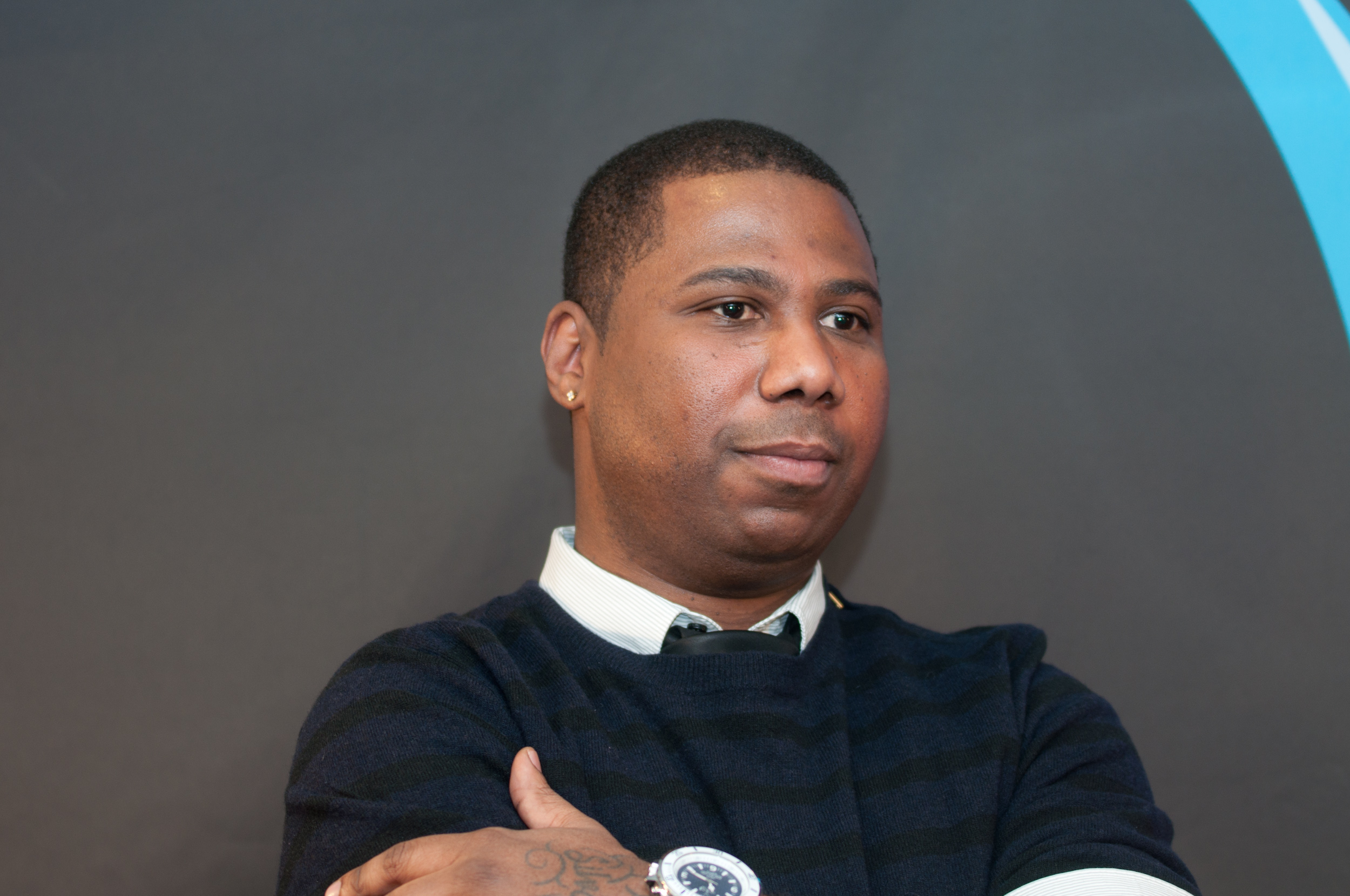
Swingfly (2010)

Swingfly landed a record deal with the largely rock oriented label Dolores Recordings. The label had been responsible for launching the international careers of several Swedish-based artists, such as Caesars, The Soundtrack of Our Lives and I'm From Barcelona. Through Dolores, he released a few singles, and an album was planned for 2006 but was stalled. The singles he released had relative success in the Scandinavian charts. A reworked version of the album was planned to be released in 2008 featuring production from RamPac, Klas Åhlund of Teddybears fame, Kleerup, Rampac and Thomas Rusiak with a rock and punk flavour and electronica influences. This was shelved after his arrest on drug charges. The album God bless the IRS finally came out on 29 April 2009.

== Melodifestivalen 2011 ==
He participated in Melodifestivalen 2011 with the song "Me and My Drum". The song prominently featured the vocals of Christoffer Hiding but without crediting him specifically in the competition credits. Swingfly placed second in the first semi-final, and advanced to the final, where he placed fifth overall.

Despite failing to win, the song gained great popularity and was released as a single reaching #2 on Sverigetopplistan, the official Swedish Singles Chart.

== Melodifestivalen 2016 ==
Swingfly participated in Melodifestivalen 2016 with the song "You Carved Your Name" featuring Helena Gutarra. The song written by Joakim Åhlund and Andreas Kleerup was performed on the third semi-final held on 20 February 2016 in Norrköping, but failed to qualify to the finals.

== In popular culture ==
- Swingfly has contributed rap vocals on many artists' songs, including Dr. Alban, Taro, Blacknuss, Robyn, Freddie Cruger, Absent Minded, Looptroop, Ken, Lutricia McNeal and Teddybears.
- The track "Singing That Melody" came out in the summer of 2008. One year before its European release, Korean artist Tony An recorded a Korean language cover of the song. This has led to a confusion as to whose version is the original. "Singing That Melody" was written by Ramstrom/Magnusson/Swingfly/Beal.
- His songs have been featured in episodes of Private Practice and One Tree Hill; telecasts from NASCAR, Fox Sports, ESPN, and NFL; and the video game FIFA Street 2.
- His songs have been used in ads for T.G.I. Friday's, Captain Morgan and Cingular Wireless, and in Tic Tac’s East European commercials.
- Swingfly was referenced in the lyrics for the song Robert Johnsson by Swedish indie duo Junior Brielle in the spring of 2023. The groups singer accused the rapper of having borrowed one thousand Swedish Kronor from him in 2015 in exchange for playing the then unsigned duos demos for famous record producers. According to the Junior Brielle song the rapper have not returned calls or the one thousand kronor to this day. As the song was a minor hit on Swedish radio the songs lyrics sparked a bit of debate in Swedish media, mostly propelled by the music journalist Fredrik Strage.

== Discography ==
=== Albums ===
Year	Album	Peak positions	Album
Year	Album	SWE	Album
2009	God Bless the IRS	–	No. / Title / Length; 1. / "Winner" / 3:28; 2. / "Singing That Melody" / 3:03; 3. / "Touch and Go" / 3:21; 4. / "Hey Boy" / 3:43; 5. / "Promise You" / 3:49; 6. / "Let You Go" / 3:18; 7. / "Time After Time" / 3:04; 8. / "Ups and Downs" / 3:21; 9. / "Save the Trees" / 3:01; 10. / "Something's Got Me Started" / 2:37; 11. / "Go to Hell" / 3:25; 12. / "Mothers Day" / 2:47
2011	Awesomeness - An Introduction to Swingfly	12	No. / Title / Length; 1. / "Me and My Drum" / 3:06; 2. / "Rag to Riches" / 3:47; 3. / "Singing That Melody" / 3:04; 4. / "Touch and Go" / 3:21; 5. / "Save the Trees" / 3:00; 6. / "Little Did I Know" / 3:56; 7. / "Promise You" / 3:51; 8. / "Something's Got Me Started" / 2:38; 9. / "Winner" / 3:29; 10. / "Let You Go" / 3:20

=== Singles ===
==== As lead artist ====
Title	Year	Peak chart positions		Certifications	Album
Title	Year	SWE	NLD	Certifications	Album
"Smoke 'em Swing"	1991	—	—		Non-album singles
"Timebomb"	1991	—	—		Non-album singles
"Sweet Dreams" (featuring Dr. Alban)	1995	12	44		Non-album singles
"Street Life" (featuring Lutricia McNeal)	1997	46	—		Non-album singles
"S.W.I.N.G - Fly"	2000	—	—		Non-album singles
"Come Get It" (featuring 8-Off Agallah & AYO)	2002	—	—		Non-album singles
"It's Alright" (featuring Dappa Don)	2002	—	—		Non-album singles
"Something's Got Me Started"	2006	22	—		God Bless the IRS
"Save the Trees"	2006	—	—		God Bless the IRS
"Singing That Melody"	2008	12	—		God Bless the IRS
"Winner"	2008	—	—		God Bless the IRS
"Touch and Go"	2009	45	—		God Bless the IRS
"Me and My Drum" (featuring Christoffer Hiding)	2011	2	—	GLF: Platinum	Awesomeness - An Introduction to Swingfly
"Little Did I Know" (featuring Pauline and Christoffer Hiding)	2011	—	—		Awesomeness - An Introduction to Swingfly
"God Damn Beautiful"	2013	—	—		Non-album single
"You Carved Your Name" (featuring Helena Gutarra)	2016	75	—		TBA
"—" denotes a single that did not chart or was not released in that territory.

==== As featured artist ====
Title	Year	Peak chart positions	Certifications	Album
Title	Year	SWE	Certifications	Album
"Hard Copy" / "Safe Sex" (Twin Tower Records featuring Swingfly)	1991	—		Non-album singles
"Hey Boy" (Teddybears STHLM featuring Swingfly)	2004	13		Non-album singles
"—" denotes a single that did not chart or was not released in that territory.
