= Falling in Love Again (Eagle-Eye Cherry song) =

1998 single by Eagle-Eye Cherry

Single by Eagle-Eye Cherry

from the album Desireless
- B-side: "Save Tonight" (live); "Miss Fortune"
- Released: 1998
- Length: 3:31 (album version); 2:53 (radio mix)
- Label: Superstudio; Polydor; Work
- Songwriter: Eagle-Eye Cherry
- Producer: Eagle-Eye Cherry

Eagle-Eye Cherry singles chronology
"When Mermaids Cry" (1998)	"Falling in Love Again" (1998)	"Permanent Tears" (1999)

Music video
- "Falling in Love Again" on YouTube

"Falling in Love Again" is the sixth track on Swedish singer Eagle-Eye Cherry's debut studio album, Desireless (1997). It was released as the album's third single in 1998 in Europe. Following the success of "Save Tonight", it was given a North American radio release in February 1999. The song reached number eight on the UK Singles Chart and peaked inside the top 50 in France, Iceland, and Ireland. Although the song charted in Canada and its music video received rotation on VH1, it did not appear on any US Billboard charts. The song's music video was directed by Stéphane Sednaoui.

== Critical reception ==
UK trade paper Music Week called Eagle-Eye Cherry's vocals on the song "crisp" and "uncomplicated". Chuck Taylor of Billboard magazine described the song as "dangerously similar" to "Save Tonight" but noted the casual differences that made the song unique, asking for a more "daring" follow-up hit.

== Chart performance ==
Unlike Cherry's first two singles—"Save Tonight" and "When Mermaids Cry"—"Falling in Love Again" did not chart within the top 60 in his native Sweden. On 4 July 1998, the song debuted on the Netherlands' Single Top 100 chart and peaked at number 70 two weeks later. In September, it entered the Icelandic Singles Chart and rose to number 27 on 2 October. Later that month, it appeared on the French and German charts, attaining a peak of number 48 in the former country and number 81 in the latter.

On 2 November 1998, the track was released in the United Kingdom and debuted at its peak of number eight on 8 November, becoming Cherry's second and final top-ten hit on the UK Singles Chart. In neighbouring Ireland, it charted at number 23, while on the Eurochart Hot 100, it debuted at number 21. After "Save Tonight" became a hit in the United States and Canada, "Falling in Love Again" was serviced to North American radio stations starting in February 1999. Despite charting on the Canadian RPM Adult Contemporary listing at number 90, it did not appear on any US Billboard chart.

== Track listings ==
Scandinavian CD single

1. "Falling in Love Again" (radio mix)
2. "Save Tonight" (live)

European CD single 1

1. "Falling in Love Again" (radio mix) – 2:47
2. "Save Tonight" (live) – 5:19
3. "Miss Fortune" – 4:16

European CD single 2

1. "Falling in Love Again" (radio mix)
2. "Miss Fortune"
3. "Falling in Love Again" (album version)
4. "Save Tonight" (live)

UK CD1

1. "Falling in Love Again" (radio mix)
2. "Save Tonight"
3. "Falling in Love Again" (live)

UK CD2

1. "Falling in Love Again" (album version)
2. "Miss Fortune"
3. "Shooting Up in Vain" (live)
4. "Falling in Love Again" (video)

UK cassette single

1. "Falling in Love Again" (radio mix)
2. "Save Tonight"

== Personnel ==
Personnel are lifted from the Desireless album booklet.

- Eagle-Eye Cherry – music, lyrics, lead vocals, background vocals, acoustic guitar, production
- Peter Forss – background vocals, bass
- Dominic Keyes – background vocals, percussion
- Mattias Torell – acoustic guitar, electric guitar
- Magnus Persson – drums
- Ed Tuton – recording, mixing

== Charts ==
Chart (1998–1999)	Peak position
Canada Adult Contemporary (RPM)	90
Europe (Eurochart Hot 100)	21
France (SNEP)	48
Germany (GfK)	81
Iceland (Íslenski Listinn Topp 40)	27
Ireland (IRMA)	23
Netherlands (Dutch Top 40 Tipparade)	10
Netherlands (Single Top 100)	70
Scottish Singles Sales (Official Charts)	5
UK Singles (Official Charts)	8

== Release history ==
Region	Date	Format(s)	Label(s)	Ref.
Europe	1998	—N/a	Superstudio; Polydor	
United Kingdom	2 November 1998	CD; cassette	Superstudio; Polydor	
United States	16 February 1999	Alternative radio	Work; Superstudio	
United States	30 March 1999	Contemporary hit radio	Work; Superstudio	
