= Kent Isaacs =

Swedish producer, mixer, and musician

- Born: Kent Gillström; Sweden
- Genres: Pop, rock
- Occupations: Actor, producer, record producer, entrepreneur, musician
- Years active: 30+
- Label: www.cosmosmusicgroup.com
- Website: www.kentisaacs.com

Kent Isaacs is a Swedish producer, mixer, musician, songwriter and music entrepreneur. He is co-owner and operator of Cosmos Music, an independent Scandinavian music label. Isaacs has been known to work with Robyn, RZA, Slick Rick, Yusuf Islam (Cat Stevens), Clay Aiken, Eagle Eye Cherry, Infinite Mass, Arnthor and Stina Nordenstam (showcased on the hit 1996 soundtrack to Romeo + Juliet).

Isaacs has been in the music industry since the early 1980s. He began his career as a musician both in the studio and touring with Swedish artists. He later transitioned beyond the stage and studio to the technical side, where he acted as producer, mixer, and technician alongside numerous Grammy-winning and well-known artists, both international and Swedish, including Robyn, Eagle Eye Cherry, and others. Isaacs has owned and maintained large studios, including Cosmos Studios. The first Cosmos Studios was sold to Max Martin, who produced and recorded the music of internationally known, Grammy/Platinum-winning artists. After selling that studio, he bought the formerly EMI-Abbey Road Studios, which became Cosmos Studios in Stockholm. Kent Isaacs sold Cosmos Studios in 2014, and it is now known as Baggpipe Studios.

Isaacs transcended the idea of a traditional musician/mixer/producer moving once again to the industry's business side, working as a consultant with agreements and issues related to the business. He operated his own publishing company and producer-house.

He acquired Bonnier Amigo, now Cosmos Music – Scandinavia's largest independent network of music companies. Cosmos Music acquired Scandinavian Songs, one of which he sold to the biggest independent music publishing company in Sweden.

As a child actor and as such touring all over Sweden, he kept acting during his years in the music scene in Stockholm. Continued in a series of award-winning commercials, but when he relocated to Los Angeles in 2012, a street casting led him back into acting. Currently doing commercials for established international brands, Kent has also been cast in different movies and TV shows.

== Cosmos Studios ==
Cosmos Studios was a songwriting and recording facility in Stockholm, Sweden. It originally opened in the early sixties as Abbey Road/EMI Studios and has since been a creative hub for Scandinavian and international artists, songwriters, and producers such as Lady Gaga, Jennifer Lopez, Keane, Korn, Beyoncé, Swedish House Mafia, John Martyn and Robyn
