= Teron Beal =

American singer-songwriter

- Birth name: Teron Beal
- Also known as: Teron
- Born: December 26, 1974 (age 50); Tyler, Texas
- Genres: R&B, soul, pop
- Occupation(s): Singer, songwriter
- Years active: 1990–present
- Labels: Pope

Teron Beal is an American singer-songwriter born in Tyler, Texas. He has also written songs for Michael Jackson, Jennifer Lopez, P!nk, Kelly Rowland, Mýa, Chrisette Michele, Robyn, Jaheim and others.

== Songwriting credits ==
- Michael Jackson – "Heaven Can Wait" (Sony, 2001)
- Bonnie Raitt – "Time of Our Lives" (Capitol)
- Jennifer Lopez – "Breaking Down (Wait)" (Columbia)
- Mýa – "Look So Good" (Interscope)
- Mýa – "After the Rain" (Interscope)
- Mýa featuring Jay-Z – "Best of Me" (Interscope)
- Mýa – "Fear of Flying" (Interscope)
- Kelly Rowland – "Past 12" (Columbia, 2003)
- Pink – "Mama Said" (Arista)
- Brandy – "Blue" (Atlantic)
- Deborah Cox – "Givin' It Up" (J Records)
- Naughty by Nature featuring 3LW – "Feels Good" (TVT)
- Boney James featuring Jaheim – "Ride" (Warner Bros.)
- Jaheim featuring Nas – "Just in Case" (Warner Bros.)
- Jamie Cullum – "My Yard" (Universal)
- Koffee Brown – "After Party" (Arista)
- Another Level – "Girlfriend" (RCA International)
- Profyle – "One Night" (Motown)
- Toya featuring Murphy Lee – "I Do (Part 2)" (Arista)
- Olivia – "Look Around" (J Records)
- Jimmy Cozier – "Playing Games" (J Records)
- Changing Faces – "Cry for Me" (Atlantic)
- Shanice – "Doin' My Thang" (LaFace)
- Rockell – "If You Don't See" (Universal)
- Immature – "Constantly" (MCA)
- Jhené – "No Love" (Columbia, 2003)
- Robyn – "Moonlight" (Jive)
- Ideal – "She Should Be Mine" (Virgin)
- Allure – "Cool with Me" (MCA)
- Raine – "N-O L-O-V-E" (Arista)
- Chrisette Michele – "All I Ever Think About" (Def Jam, 2009)
