= Brolle =

Swedish singer and musician

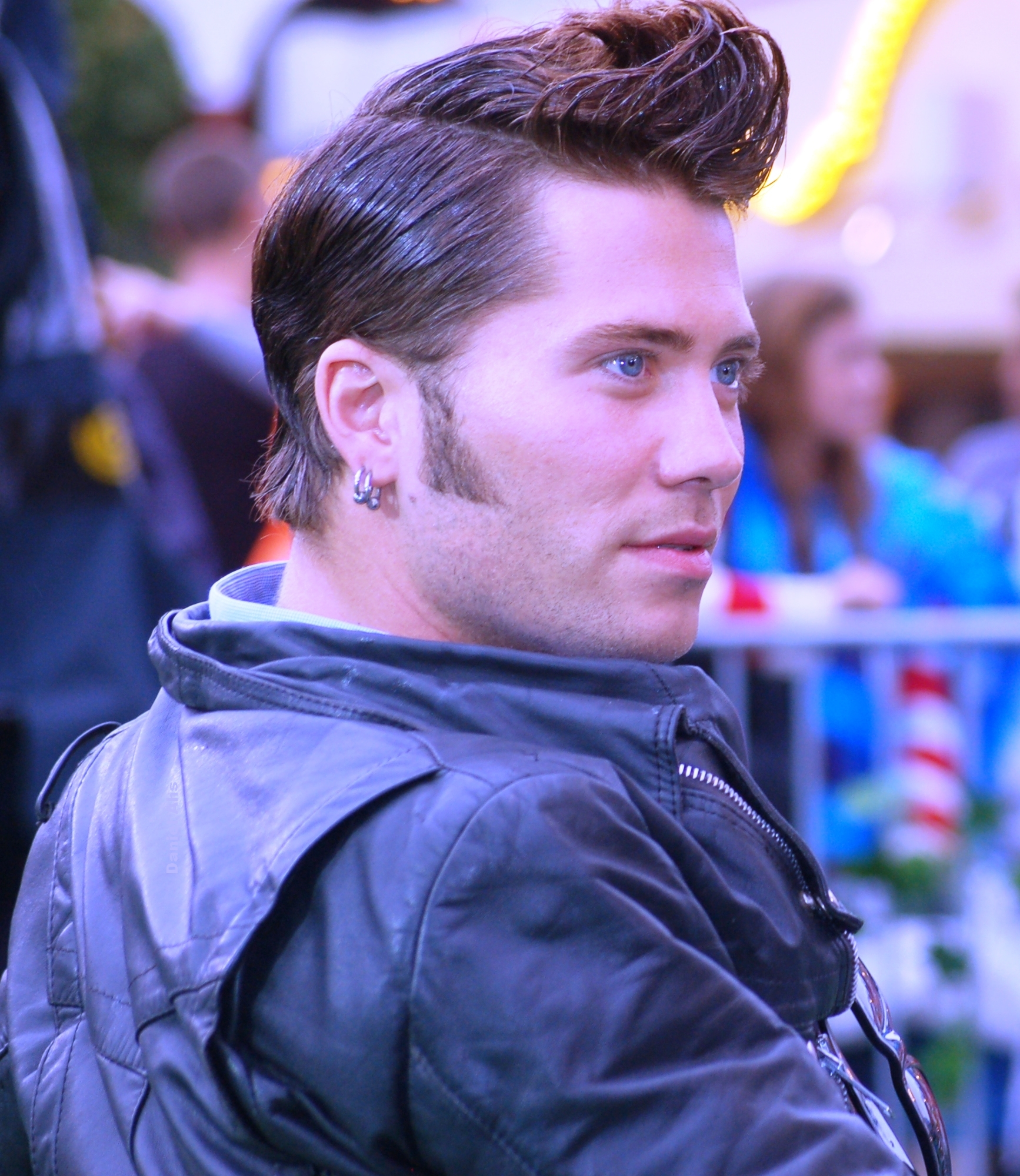
- Brolle in 2008

Background information
- Also known as: Brolle, Brolle Jr
- Born: Kjell Junior Wallmark; November 10, 1981 (age 44)
- Origin: Boden, Sweden
- Genres: Pop, soul, rock
- Occupation: Singer
- Instrument: Vocals
- Years active: 2001–present

Brolle (born Kjell Junior Wallmark, November 10, 1981), is a Swedish singer and musician who was discovered in the Kanal 5 series Popstars in 2001.

Brolle was born in Boden. Although he did not reach the final of Popstars, Brolle soon got a record deal and released his first single Playing with fire. He has also done musicals such as Footloose (in which he replaced Måns Zelmerlöw) and he performed music by Buddy Holly.

== Discography ==
=== Albums ===
Title	Year	Peak chart positions
Title	Year	SWE
Rebellious Heart	2002	10
Paradise Will Wait	2004	16
Brolle Jr Tolkar Cornelius - En Stund På Jorden	2005	25
Ett Hjärta Som Glöder, Som En Gång Brann	2008	5
Burned By the Fire	2011	4
Alla rosor har en tagg	2013	25

=== Singles ===
- 2002: "Last Night"
- 2002: "Playing with Fire"
- 2002: "Heartbreak City"
- 2004: "Watching the Stars"
- 2004: "Sound of a Drum"
- 2004: "Let It Rain"
- 2005: "Sommarkort - En stund på jorden"
- 2008: "Solo i Stockholm"
- 2008: "Fashion"
- 2010: "Anything She Wants"
