= E.M.D. discography =

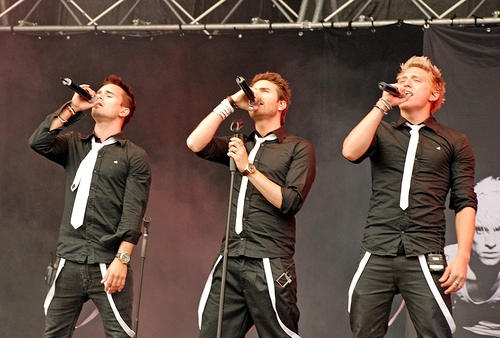
- E.M.D. in 2008
- Studio albums: 3
- Singles: 11
- Music videos: 5

Swedish boy band E.M.D. have released three studio albums and eleven singles, between 2007 and 2010.

== Discography ==
=== Studio albums ===
| Year | Album details | Peak position | Certifications (sales threshold) |
| Year | Album details | SWE | Certifications (sales threshold) |
|---|---|---|---|
| 2008 | A State of Mind: Release date: 14 May 2008; Label: Sony BMG; Formats: CD, digital download | 1 | SWE: Platinum |
| 2009 | Välkommen hem: Release date: 9 November 2009; Label: Sony BMG; Formats: CD, digital download | 6 | SWE: 4× Platinum |
| 2010 | Rewind: Release date: 3 December 2010; Label: Sony BMG; Formats: CD, digital download | 20 | SWE: Gold |

=== Singles ===
| Year | Single | Peak positions | Certifications (sales threshold) | Album |
| Year | Single | SWE | Certifications (sales threshold) | Album |
|---|---|---|---|---|
| 2007 | "All for Love" | 1 | SWE: 3× Platinum | A State of Mind |
| 2008 | "Jennie Let Me Love You" | 1 | SWE: Gold | A State of Mind |
| 2008 | "Alone" | 1 | | A State of Mind |
| 2009 | "Baby Goodbye" | 1 | SWE: Gold | A State of Mind |
| 2009 | "Youngblood" | 22 | | A State of Mind |
| 2009 | "Välkommen hem" | 3 | | Välkommen hem |
| 2010 | "Save Tonight" | 3 | | Rewind |
| 2010 | "What Is Love" | — | | Rewind |
| 2010 | "There's a Place for Us" | — | | Rewind |
| 2011 | "Lemon Tree" | 12 | | Rewind |
| 2011 | "Anywhere Is Paradise" | 26 | | Rewind |
"—" denotes releases that did not chart
