= List of number-one singles of the 2000s (Sweden) =

Veckans singellista or Veckolista singlar is a record chart that ranks the best-performing singles of Sweden. Chart is published and owned by IFPI Sverige. Since 2006 chart was based on weekly physical and digital sales data compiled by Swedish Recording Industry Association.

During the 2000s, 200 singles reached the number-one position on the chart. Markoolio was the most successful artist at reaching the top spot, with 10 number-one singles. Las Ketchup's single "The Ketchup Song (Aserejé)" spent 16 weeks at number one in 2002 and one week in 2003, which was the longest spell at the top of the chart of the decade.

The first number one of the decade, the "Millennium 2" by Markoolio, was a holdover from the end of 1999. "Higher" by Erik Grönwall was the final number one of the decade.

== Number-one singles ==
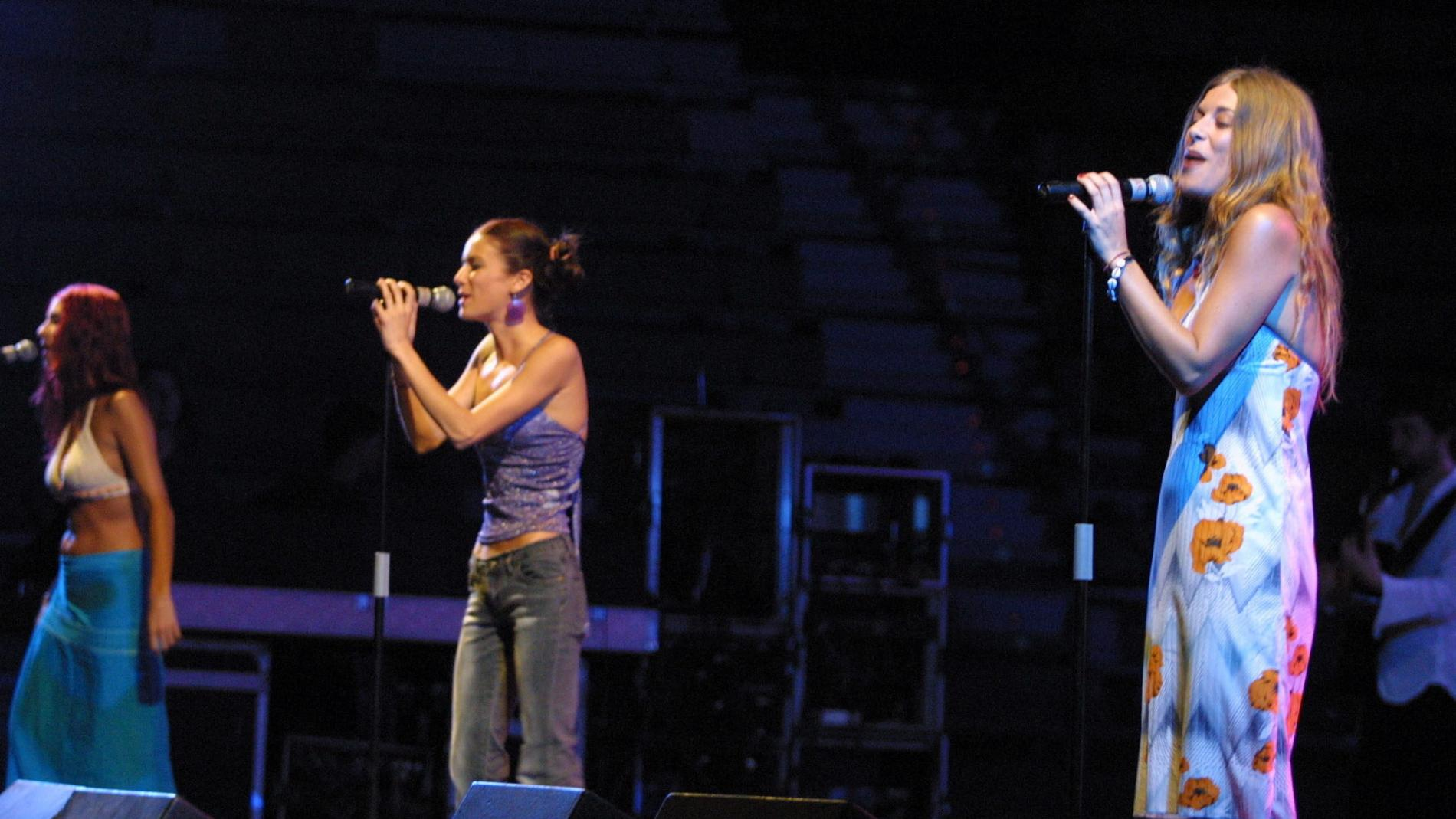
Las Ketchup's (pictured in 2003) debut single "The Ketchup Song (Aserejé)" spent eleven consecutive weeks at top the chart

Key
*	Indicates best-performing single of the year

Title	Artist(s)	Issue date
2000
"Millennium 2"	Markoolio	6 January
"Freestyler"	Bomfunk MC's	13 January
"Freestyler"	Bomfunk MC's	20 January
"Freestyler"	Bomfunk MC's	27 January
"Freestyler"	Bomfunk MC's	3 February
"Freestyler"	Bomfunk MC's	10 February
"Freestyler"	Bomfunk MC's	17 February
"Freestyler"	Bomfunk MC's	24 February
"Freestyler"	Bomfunk MC's	2 March
"Freestyler"	Bomfunk MC's	9 March
"Freestyler"	Bomfunk MC's	16 March
"American Pie"	Madonna	23 March
"Never Be the Same Again"	Melanie C featuring Lisa "Left Eye" Lopes	30 March
"Never Be the Same Again"	Melanie C featuring Lisa "Left Eye" Lopes	6 April
"Never Be the Same Again"	Melanie C featuring Lisa "Left Eye" Lopes	13 April
"Maria Maria"	Santana featuring The Product G&B	20 April
"Maria Maria"	Santana featuring The Product G&B	27 April
"Oops!... I Did It Again"	Britney Spears	4 May
"Oops!... I Did It Again"	Britney Spears	11 May
"Mera mål!"	Markoolio featuring Arne Hegerfors	18 May
"Mera mål!"	Markoolio featuring Arne Hegerfors	25 May
"Fly on the Wings of Love"	Olsen Brothers	1 June
"Mera mål!"	Markoolio featuring Arne Hegerfors	8 June
"Mera mål!"	Markoolio featuring Arne Hegerfors	15 June
"Mera mål!"	Markoolio featuring Arne Hegerfors	22 June
"Mera mål!"	Markoolio featuring Arne Hegerfors	29 June
"Mera mål!"	Markoolio featuring Arne Hegerfors	6 July
"Mera mål!"	Markoolio featuring Arne Hegerfors	13 July
"Mera mål!"	Markoolio featuring Arne Hegerfors	20 July
"Hiphopper"	Thomas Rusiak featuring Teddybears STHLM	27 July
"Hiphopper"	Thomas Rusiak featuring Teddybears STHLM	3 August
"Hiphopper"	Thomas Rusiak featuring Teddybears STHLM	10 August
"I Turn to You"	Melanie C	17 August
"I Turn to You"	Melanie C	24 August
"I Turn to You"	Melanie C	31 August
"Lucky"	Britney Spears	7 September
"Nitar och läder"	Magnus Uggla	14 September
"Lucky"	Britney Spears	21 September
"Nitar och läder"	Magnus Uggla	28 September
"Nitar och läder"	Magnus Uggla	5 October
"Nitar och läder"	Magnus Uggla	12 October
"De tio budorden"	Feven	19 October
"De tio budorden"	Feven	26 October
"Shape of My Heart"	Backstreet Boys	2 November
"My Love"	Westlife	9 November
"She Bangs"	Ricky Martin	16 November
"My Love"	Westlife	23 November
"911"	Wyclef Jean featuring Mary J. Blige	30 November
"911"	Wyclef Jean featuring Mary J. Blige	7 December
"911"	Wyclef Jean featuring Mary J. Blige	14 December
"911"	Wyclef Jean featuring Mary J. Blige	21 December
"911"	Wyclef Jean featuring Mary J. Blige	27 December
2001
"Can't Fight the Moonlight"	LeAnn Rimes	5 January
"Can't Fight the Moonlight"	LeAnn Rimes	12 January
"Can't Fight the Moonlight"	LeAnn Rimes	19 January
"Ms. Jackson"	Outkast	26 January
"Ms. Jackson"	Outkast	2 February
"Romeo"	Shebang	9 February
"Romeo"	Shebang	16 February
"Romeo"	Shebang	23 February
"Romeo"	Shebang	2 March
"Romeo"	Shebang	9 March
"Romeo"	Shebang	16 March
"Romeo"	Shebang	23 March
"The Centre of the Heart"	Roxette	30 March
"The Centre of the Heart"	Roxette	6 April
"The Centre of the Heart"	Roxette	13 April
"The Centre of the Heart"	Roxette	20 April
"Need to Know (Eenie Meenie Miney Moe)"	Excellence	27 April
"Need to Know (Eenie Meenie Miney Moe)"	Excellence	4 May
"Need to Know (Eenie Meenie Miney Moe)"	Excellence	11 May
"Need to Know (Eenie Meenie Miney Moe)"	Excellence	18 May
"Need to Know (Eenie Meenie Miney Moe)"	Excellence	25 May
"Daddy DJ"	Daddy DJ	1 June
"Angel"	Shaggy featuring Rayvon	8 June
"Angel"	Shaggy featuring Rayvon	15 June
"Angel"	Shaggy featuring Rayvon	22 June
"Angel"	Shaggy featuring Rayvon	29 June
"Daddy DJ"	Daddy DJ	6 July
"Lady Marmalade"	Christina Aguilera, Pink, Lil' Kim, and Mýa	13 July
"Lady Marmalade"	Christina Aguilera, Pink, Lil' Kim, and Mýa	20 July
"Lady Marmalade"	Christina Aguilera, Pink, Lil' Kim, and Mýa	27 July
"There You'll Be"	Faith Hill	3 August
"There You'll Be"	Faith Hill	10 August
"There You'll Be"	Faith Hill	17 August
"There You'll Be"	Faith Hill	24 August
"There You'll Be"	Faith Hill	31 August
"Follow Me"	Uncle Kracker	7 September
"Follow Me"	Uncle Kracker	14 September
"Follow Me"	Uncle Kracker	21 September
"Follow Me"	Uncle Kracker	28 September
"Follow Me"	Uncle Kracker	5 October
"Can't Get You Out of My Head"	Kylie Minogue	12 October
"Can't Get You Out of My Head"	Kylie Minogue	19 October
"Can't Get You Out of My Head"	Kylie Minogue	26 October
"Rocka på"	Markoolio vs. The Boppers	2 November
"Rocka på"	Markoolio vs. The Boppers	9 November
"Rocka på"	Markoolio vs. The Boppers	16 November
"Life"	E-Type	23 November
"Rocka på"	Markoolio vs. The Boppers	30 November
"Life"	E-Type	7 December
"Rocka på"	Markoolio vs. The Boppers	14 December
"Rocka på"	Markoolio vs. The Boppers	21 December
"Rocka på"	Markoolio vs. The Boppers	28 December
2002
"Life"	E-Type	4 January
"Life"	E-Type	11 January
"Life"	E-Type	18 January
"Whenever, Wherever"	Shakira	25 January
"Luften bor i mina steg"	Håkan Hellström	1 February
"Luften bor i mina steg"	Håkan Hellström	8 February
"Whenever, Wherever"	Shakira	15 February
"Whenever, Wherever"	Shakira	22 February
"Whenever, Wherever"	Shakira	1 March
"Whenever, Wherever"	Shakira	8 March
"Whenever, Wherever"	Shakira	15 March
"Never Let It Go"	Afro-dite	22 March
"Dom andra"	Kent	29 March
"Dom andra"	Kent	5 April
"Dom andra"	Kent	12 April
"Dom andra"	Kent	19 April
"Supernatural"	Supernatural	26 April
"Supernatural"	Supernatural	3 May
"Supernatural"	Supernatural	10 May
"Supernatural"	Supernatural	17 May
"Supernatural"	Supernatural	23 May
"Supernatural"	Supernatural	29 May
"Vi ska till vm!"	Magnus Uggla	6 June
"Vi ska till vm!"	Magnus Uggla	13 June
"Vi ska till vm!"	Magnus Uggla	20 June
"S:t Monica"	Ulf Lundell	27 June
"S:t Monica"	Ulf Lundell	4 July
"A Little Less Conversation"	Elvis Presley vs. JXL	11 July
"A Little Less Conversation"	Elvis Presley vs. JXL	18 July
"A Little Less Conversation"	Elvis Presley vs. JXL	25 July
"A Little Less Conversation"	Elvis Presley vs. JXL	1 August
"A Little Less Conversation"	Elvis Presley vs. JXL	8 August
"A Little Less Conversation"	Elvis Presley vs. JXL	15 August
"A Little Less Conversation"	Elvis Presley vs. JXL	22 August
"A Little Less Conversation"	Elvis Presley vs. JXL	29 August
"A Little Less Conversation"	Elvis Presley vs. JXL	5 September
"The Ketchup Song (Aserejé)"	Las Ketchup	12 September
"The Ketchup Song (Aserejé)"	Las Ketchup	19 September
"The Ketchup Song (Aserejé)"	Las Ketchup	26 September
"The Ketchup Song (Aserejé)"	Las Ketchup	3 October
"The Ketchup Song (Aserejé)"	Las Ketchup	10 October
"The Ketchup Song (Aserejé)"	Las Ketchup	17 October
"The Ketchup Song (Aserejé)"	Las Ketchup	24 October
"The Ketchup Song (Aserejé)"	Las Ketchup	31 October
"The Ketchup Song (Aserejé)"	Las Ketchup	7 November
"The Ketchup Song (Aserejé)"	Las Ketchup	14 November
"The Ketchup Song (Aserejé)"	Las Ketchup	21 November
"The Ketchup Song (Aserejé)"	Las Ketchup	28 November
"The Ketchup Song (Aserejé)"	Las Ketchup	5 December
"The Ketchup Song (Aserejé)"	Las Ketchup	12 December
"The Ketchup Song (Aserejé)"	Las Ketchup	19 December
"The Ketchup Song (Aserejé)"	Las Ketchup	26 December
2003
"The Ketchup Song (Aserejé)"	Las Ketchup	2 January
"Tu es foutu"	In-Grid	9 January
"Tu es foutu"	In-Grid	16 January
"Lose Yourself"	Eminem	23 January
"Lose Yourself"	Eminem	30 January
"Lose Yourself"	Eminem	6 February
"Lose Yourself"	Eminem	13 February
"Lose Yourself"	Eminem	20 February
"Lose Yourself"	Eminem	27 February
"Lose Yourself"	Eminem	6 March
"Lose Yourself"	Eminem	13 March
"I Drove All Night"	Celine Dion	20 March
"Give Me Your Love"	Fame	27 March
"Give Me Your Love"	Fame	3 April
"Not a Sinner nor a Saint"	Alcazar	10 April
"Den andra kvinnan"	Glenmark / Eriksson / Strömstedt	17 April
"Anyone of Us (Stupid Mistake)"	Gareth Gates	24 April
"Give Me Your Love"	Fame	1 May
"Alive"	Da Buzz	8 May
"Alive"	Da Buzz	15 May
"Alive"	Da Buzz	22 May
"Alive"	Da Buzz	29 May
"Alive"	Da Buzz	5 June
"Without You"	Anders Johansson	12 June
"Everyway That I Can"	Sertab Erener	19 June
"Everyway That I Can"	Sertab Erener	26 June
"Everyway That I Can"	Sertab Erener	4 July
"Här kommer alla känslorna (på en och samma gång)"	Per Gessle	11 July
"Här kommer alla känslorna (på en och samma gång)"	Per Gessle	18 July
"Här kommer alla känslorna (på en och samma gång)"	Per Gessle	25 July
"Här kommer alla känslorna (på en och samma gång)"	Per Gessle	1 August
"Här kommer alla känslorna (på en och samma gång)"	Per Gessle	8 August
"Här kommer alla känslorna (på en och samma gång)"	Per Gessle	15 August
"Här kommer alla känslorna (på en och samma gång)"	Per Gessle	22 August
"Här kommer alla känslorna (på en och samma gång)"	Per Gessle	29 August
"Where Is the Love?"	The Black Eyed Peas	5 September
"Aïcha"	Outlandish	12 September
"Aïcha"	Outlandish	19 September
"When We Were Winning"	Broder Daniel	26 September
"Aïcha"	Outlandish	3 October
"Aïcha"	Outlandish	10 October
"Aïcha"	Outlandish	17 October
"Om du stannar hos mig"	Nina & Kim	24 October
"Vilse i skogen"	Markoolio	31 October
"Vilse i skogen"	Markoolio	7 November
"Vilse i skogen"	Markoolio	14 November
"Vilse i skogen"	Markoolio	21 November
"Starkare"	Sara Löfgren	28 November
"Vilse i skogen"	Markoolio	5 December
"Starkare"	Sara Löfgren	12 December
"Vilse i skogen"	Markoolio	19 December
"Vilse i skogen"	Markoolio	26 December
2004
"Hey Ya!"	Outkast	2 January
"Starkare"	Sara Löfgren	9 January
"Shut Up"	The Black Eyed Peas	16 January
"Shut Up"	The Black Eyed Peas	23 January
"Shut Up"	The Black Eyed Peas	30 January
"Behind Blue Eyes"	Limp Bizkit	6 February
"Kom hem hel igen"	Sandra Dahlberg	13 February
"Ding Dong Song"	Günther & The Sunshine Girls	20 February
"Ding Dong Song"	Günther & The Sunshine Girls	27 February
"Ding Dong Song"	Günther & The Sunshine Girls	5 March
"F**k It (I Don't Want You Back)"	Eamon	12 March
"F**k It (I Don't Want You Back)"	Eamon	19 March
"Det gör ont"	Lena Philipsson	26 March
"Det gör ont"	Lena Philipsson	2 April
"Det gör ont"	Lena Philipsson	9 April
"Det gör ont"	Lena Philipsson	16 April
"Det gör ont"	Lena Philipsson	23 April
"Det gör ont"	Lena Philipsson	30 April
"Det gör ont"	Lena Philipsson	7 April
"Teeny Weeny String Bikini"	Günther & The Sunshine Girls	14 May
"In med bollen"	Markoolio	21 May
"Tuffa tider (för en drömmare)/En sten vid en sjö i en skog"	Gyllene Tider	28 May
"Tuffa tider (för en drömmare)/En sten vid en sjö i en skog"	Gyllene Tider	4 June
"Tuffa tider (för en drömmare)/En sten vid en sjö i en skog"	Gyllene Tider	11 June
"Hej Hej Monika"	Nic & the Family	18 June
"Hej Hej Monika"	Nic & the Family	25 June
"Hej Hej Monika"	Nic & the Family	1 July
"Ingen vill veta var du köpt din tröja"	Raymond & Maria	9 July
"Hej Hej Monika"	Nic & the Family	16 July
"Ingen vill veta var du köpt din tröja"	Raymond & Maria	23 July
"Ingen vill veta var du köpt din tröja"	Raymond & Maria	30 July
"Ingen vill veta var du köpt din tröja"	Raymond & Maria	6 August
"Ingen vill veta var du köpt din tröja"	Raymond & Maria	13 August
"Dragostea Din Tei"	Haiducii	20 August
"Dragostea Din Tei"	Haiducii	27 August
"Dragostea Din Tei"	Haiducii	3 September
"Dragostea Din Tei"	Haiducii	10 September
"Dragostea Din Tei"	Haiducii	17 September
"Elegi"	Lars Winnerbäck	24 September
"Boro Boro"	Arash	1 October
"Bigtime"	The Soundtrack of Our Lives	8 October
"Boro Boro"	Arash	15 October
"I Won't Cry"	Elin Lanto	22 October
"I Won't Cry"	Elin Lanto	29 October
"I Won't Cry"	Elin Lanto	5 November
"Call on Me"	Eric Prydz	11 November
"I Won't Cry"	Elin Lanto	18 November
"Touch Me"	Günther featuring Samantha Fox	25 November
"Call on Me"	Eric Prydz	2 December
"Coming True"	Daniel Lindström	9 December
"Coming True"	Daniel Lindström	16 December
"Coming True"	Daniel Lindström	23 December
"Coming True"	Daniel Lindström	30 December
2005
"Coming True"	Daniel Lindström	6 January
"Coming True"	Daniel Lindström	13 January
"Coming True"	Daniel Lindström	20 January
"En midsommarnattsdröm"	Håkan Hellström	27 January
"Money for Nothing"	Darin	3 February
"Money for Nothing"	Darin	10 February
"Max 500"	Kent	17 February
"Money for Nothing"	Darin	24 February
"Money for Nothing"	Darin	3 March
"Alcastar"	Alcazar	10 March
"Vi kan gunga"	Jimmy Jansson	17 March
"Las Vegas"	Martin Stenmarck	24 March
"Håll om mig"	Nanne	31 March
"What's in It for Me"	Amy Diamond	7 April
"What's in It for Me"	Amy Diamond	14 April
"What's in It for Me"	Amy Diamond	21 April
"Håll om mig"	Nanne	28 April
"Schnappi, das kleine Krokodil"	Schnappi	5 May
"Palace & Main"	Kent	12 May
"Schnappi, das kleine Krokodil"	Schnappi	19 May
"Schnappi, das kleine Krokodil"	Schnappi	26 May
"My Number One"	Helena Paparizou	2 June
"My Number One"	Helena Paparizou	9 June
"My Number One"	Helena Paparizou	16 June
"My Number One"	Helena Paparizou	23 June
"Stort liv"	Lars Winnerbäck & Hovet	30 June
"Stort liv"	Lars Winnerbäck & Hovet	7 July
"Stort liv"	Lars Winnerbäck & Hovet	14 July
"Axel F"	Crazy Frog	21 July
"Axel F"	Crazy Frog	28 July
"Axel F"	Crazy Frog	4 August
"Axel F"	Crazy Frog	11 August
"Axel F"	Crazy Frog	18 August
"Axel F"	Crazy Frog	25 August
"Axel F"	Crazy Frog	1 September
"You're Beautiful"	James Blunt	8 September
"Step Up"	Darin	15 September
"You're Beautiful"	James Blunt	22 September
"You're Beautiful"	James Blunt	29 September
"You're Beautiful"	James Blunt	6 October
"Precious"	Depeche Mode	13 October
"Step Up"	Darin	20 October
"You're Beautiful"	James Blunt	27 October
"Fanfanfan"	Thåström	3 November
"The hjärta & smärta EP"	Kent	10 November
"Hung Up"	Madonna	17 November
"Hung Up"	Madonna	24 November
"Hung Up"	Madonna	1 December
"Hung Up"	Madonna	8 December
"Right Here, Right Now (My Heart Belongs to You)"	Agnes	15 December
"Right Here, Right Now (My Heart Belongs to You)"	Agnes	22 December
"Right Here, Right Now (My Heart Belongs to You)"	Agnes	29 December
2006
"Right Here, Right Now (My Heart Belongs to You)"	Agnes	5 January
"Right Here, Right Now (My Heart Belongs to You)"	Agnes	12 January
"Hung Up"	Madonna	19 January
"Right Here, Right Now (My Heart Belongs to You)"	Agnes	26 January
"Goodbye My Lover"	James Blunt	2 February
"Do What You're Told"	Sebastian	9 February
"Do What You're Told"	Sebastian	16 February
"Do What You're Told"	Sebastian	23 February
"Do What You're Told"	Sebastian	2 March
"Last Goodbye"	Da Buzz	9 March
"Lev livet!"	Magnus Carlsson	16 March
"Evighet"	Carola	23 March
"Evighet"	Carola	30 March
"Temple of Love"	BWO	6 April
"Evighet"	Carola	13 April
"Temple of Love"	BWO	20 April
"Rain"	Ola	27 April
"Rain"	Ola	4 May
"Rain"	Ola	11 May
"Lovegun / Nightfever"	Andreas Lundstedt	18 May
"Who's da' Man"	Elias featuring Frans	25 May
"Who's da' Man"	Elias featuring Frans	1 June
"Who's da' Man"	Elias featuring Frans	8 June
"Who's da' Man"	Elias featuring Frans	15 June
"Who's da' Man"	Elias featuring Frans	22 June
"Who's da' Man"	Elias featuring Frans	29 June
"Who's da' Man"	Elias featuring Frans	6 July
"Who's da' Man"	Elias featuring Frans	13 July
"Who's da' Man"	Elias featuring Frans	20 July
"Who's da' Man"	Elias featuring Frans	27 July
"Boten Anna"	Basshunter	3 August
"Heroes"	Helena Paparizou	10 August
"Boten Anna"	Basshunter	17 August
"The Reincarnation of Benjamin Breeg"	Iron Maiden	24 August
"The Reincarnation of Benjamin Breeg"	Iron Maiden	31 August
"Everytime We Touch"	Cascada	7 September
"Sjumilakliv"	Martin Stenmarck	14 September
"Sjumilakliv"	Martin Stenmarck	21 September
"Sjumilakliv"	Martin Stenmarck	28 September
"Oh Father"	Linda Sundblad	5 October
"Sjumilakliv"	Martin Stenmarck	12 October
"Sjumilakliv"	Martin Stenmarck	19 October
"Sjumilakliv"	Martin Stenmarck	26 October
"Sjumilakliv"	Martin Stenmarck	2 November
"Sjumilakliv"	Martin Stenmarck	9 November
"Sjumilakliv"	Martin Stenmarck	16 November
"Sjumilakliv"	Martin Stenmarck	23 November
"I Don't Feel Like Dancin'"	Scissor Sisters	30 November
"Everything Changes"	Markus Fagervall	7 December
"Everything Changes"	Markus Fagervall	14 December
"Everything Changes"	Markus Fagervall	21 December
"Everything Changes"	Markus Fagervall	28 December
2007
"Everything Changes"	Markus Fagervall	4 January
"Everything Changes"	Markus Fagervall	11 January
"Everything Changes"	Markus Fagervall	18 January
"Don't You Know"	United DJ's vs. Pandora	25 January
"I Can't Say I'm Sorry"	Erik Segerstedt	1 February
"Värsta schlagern"	Markoolio & Linda Bengtzing	8 February
"Värsta schlagern"	Markoolio & Linda Bengtzing	15 February
"Tokyo"	Danny Saucedo	22 February
"Tokyo"	Danny Saucedo	1 March
"Girlfriend"	Avril Lavigne	8 March
"The Worrying Kind"	The Ark	15 March
"The Worrying Kind"	The Ark	22 March
"The Worrying Kind"	The Ark	29 March
"Cara Mia"	Måns Zelmerlöw	5 April
"Cara Mia"	Måns Zelmerlöw	12 April
"Cara Mia"	Måns Zelmerlöw	19 April
"Cara Mia"	Måns Zelmerlöw	26 April
"The Worrying Kind"	The Ark	3 May
"Dunka mig gul & blå"	Frida Murenius	10 May
"Ingen sommar utan reggae"	Markoolio	17 May
"True Believer"	E-Type	24 May
"En händig man"	Per Gessle	31 May
"Play It for the Girls"	Danny Saucedo	7 June
"Ingen sommar utan reggae"	Markoolio	14 June
"Ingen sommar utan reggae"	Markoolio	21 June
"Natalie"	Ola	28 June
"Natalie"	Ola	5 July
"Ingen sommar utan reggae"	Markoolio	12 July
"Ingen sommar utan reggae"	Markoolio	19 July
"Natalie"	Ola	26 July
"Natalie"	Ola	2 August
"I'm Gay"	6 AM featuring Cissi Ramsby	9 August
"Natalie"	Ola	16 August
"Natalie"	Ola	23 August
"Om du lämnade mig nu"	Lars Winnerbäck featuring Miss Li	30 August
"Om du lämnade mig nu"	Lars Winnerbäck featuring Miss Li	6 September
"Om du lämnade mig nu"	Lars Winnerbäck featuring Miss Li	13 September
"100 år från nu (Blundar)"	Martin Stenmarck	20 September
"100 år från nu (Blundar)"	Martin Stenmarck	27 September
"100 år från nu (Blundar)"	Martin Stenmarck	4 October
"Pärlor åt svin"	Magnus Uggla	11 October
"Pärlor åt svin"	Magnus Uggla	18 October
"Pärlor åt svin"	Magnus Uggla	25 October
"Västerbron & Vampires EP"	Laakso	1 November
"Apologize"	Timbaland presents OneRepublic	8 November
"Apologize"	Timbaland presents OneRepublic	15 November
"S.O.S."	Ola	22 November
"Apologize"	Timbaland presents OneRepublic	29 November
"Apologize"	Timbaland presents OneRepublic	6 December
"This Moment"	Marie Picasso	13 December
"This Moment"	Marie Picasso	19 December
"All for Love"	E.M.D.	27 December
2008
"All for Love"	E.M.D.	3 January
"All for Love"	E.M.D.	10 January
"All for Love"	E.M.D.	17 January
"All for Love"	E.M.D.	24 January
"All for Love"	E.M.D.	31 January
"Do You Love Me?"	Amanda Jenssen	7 February
"Do You Love Me?"	Amanda Jenssen	14 February
"Do You Love Me?"	Amanda Jenssen	21 February
"Do You Love Me?"	Amanda Jenssen	28 February
"Do You Love Me?"	Amanda Jenssen	6 March
"Hero"	Charlotte Perrelli	13 March
"Hero"	Charlotte Perrelli	20 March
"Hero"	Charlotte Perrelli	27 March
"Hero"	Charlotte Perrelli	3 April
"Hero"	Charlotte Perrelli	10 April
"Jennie Let Me Love You"	E.M.D.	17 April
"Jennie Let Me Love You"	E.M.D.	24 April
"Jennie Let Me Love You"	E.M.D.	1 May
"Jennie Let Me Love You"	E.M.D.	8 May
"Jennie Let Me Love You"	E.M.D.	15 May
"Jennie Let Me Love You"	E.M.D.	22 May
"Fotbollsfest"	Frans featuring Elias	29 May
"Cliffs of Gallipoli"	Sabaton	5 June
"Sverige, det bästa på vår jord"	Markoolio	12 June
"I'm Yours"	Jason Mraz	19 June
"Football Is Our Religion"	Rednex	26 June
"I'm Yours"	Jason Mraz	3 July
"I'm Yours"	Jason Mraz	10 July
"I'm Yours"	Jason Mraz	17 July
"Curly Sue"	Takida	24 July
"Pick Me Up"	Emilia de Poret	31 July
"I Kissed a Girl"	Katy Perry	7 August
"Raise the Banner"	The Poodles	14 August
"Raise the Banner"	The Poodles	21 August
"Där du andas"	Marie Fredriksson	28 August
"I Kissed a Girl"	Katy Perry	4 September
"I Kissed a Girl"	Katy Perry	11 September
"I Kissed a Girl"	Katy Perry	18 September
"Nu när du gått"	Lena & Orup	25 September
"Alone"	E.M.D.	2 October
"Nu när du gått"	Lena & Orup	9 October
"Womanizer"	Britney Spears	16 October
"A Million Candles Burning"	Martin Stenmarck	23 October
"Silly Really"	Per Gessle	30 October
"If I Were a Boy"	Beyoncé	6 November
"If I Were a Boy"	Beyoncé	13 November
"If I Were a Boy"	Beyoncé	20 November
"If I Were a Boy"	Beyoncé	27 November
"Radio"	Danny Saucedo	4 December
"Radio"	Danny Saucedo	11 December
"With Every Bit of Me"	Kevin Borg	18 December
"With Every Bit of Me"	Kevin Borg	25 December
2009
"With Every Bit of Me"	Kevin Borg	2 January
"With Every Bit of Me"	Kevin Borg	9 January
"Poker Face"	Lady Gaga	16 January
"With Every Bit of Me"	Kevin Borg	23 January
"Poker Face"	Lady Gaga	30 January
"Carina"	Larz-Kristerz	6 February
"3 Floors Down"	Kim Fransson	13 February
"Poker Face"	Lady Gaga	20 February
"Poker Face"	Lady Gaga	27 February
"Med hjärtat fyllt av ljus"	Shirley Clamp	6 March
"Baby Goodbye"	E.M.D.	13 March
"Baby Goodbye"	E.M.D.	20 March
"Tingaliin"	P-Bros featuring DJ Trexx and Olga Pratilova	27 March
"Tingaliin"	P-Bros featuring DJ Trexx and Olga Pratilova	3 April
"Tingaliin"	P-Bros featuring DJ Trexx and Olga Pratilova	10 April
"Tingaliin"	P-Bros featuring DJ Trexx and Olga Pratilova	17 April
"Emma-Lee"	Johan Palm	24 April
"Losing You"	Dead by April	1 May
"Losing You"	Dead by April	8 May
"Svennebanan"	Promoe	15 May
"Fairytale"	Alexander Rybak	22 May
"Fairytale"	Alexander Rybak	29 May
"Fairytale"	Alexander Rybak	5 June
"Fairytale"	Alexander Rybak	12 June
"Fairytale"	Alexander Rybak	19 June
"Ayo Technology"	Milow	26 June
"Rap das Armas"	Cidinho e Doca	3 July
"Sky's the Limit"	Ola	10 July
"Handful of Keys"	Robert Wells	17 July
"Rap das armas"	Cidinho e Doca	24 July
"Rap das armas"	Cidinho e Doca	31 July
"Rap das armas"	Cidinho e Doca	7 August
"Celebration"	Madonna	14 August
"Celebration"	Madonna	21 August
"Jag får liksom ingen ordning"	Lars Winnerbäck	28 August
"Jag får liksom ingen ordning"	Lars Winnerbäck	4 September
"I Gotta Feeling"	The Black Eyed Peas	11 September
"I Gotta Feeling"	The Black Eyed Peas	18 September
"I Gotta Feeling"	The Black Eyed Peas	25 September
"1000 Nålar"	Martin Stenmarck	2 October
"I Gotta Feeling"	The Black Eyed Peas	9 October
"Töntarna"	Kent	16 October
"Töntarna"	Kent	23 October
"Viva la Vida"	Darin	30 October
"Viva la Vida"	Darin	6 November
"2000"	Kent	13 November
"Bad Romance"	Lady Gaga	20 November
"Bad Romance"	Lady Gaga	27 November
"Bad Romance"	Lady Gaga	4 December
"Bad Romance"	Lady Gaga	11 December
"Higher"	Erik Grönwall	18 December
"Higher"	Erik Grönwall	25 December

=== By artist ===
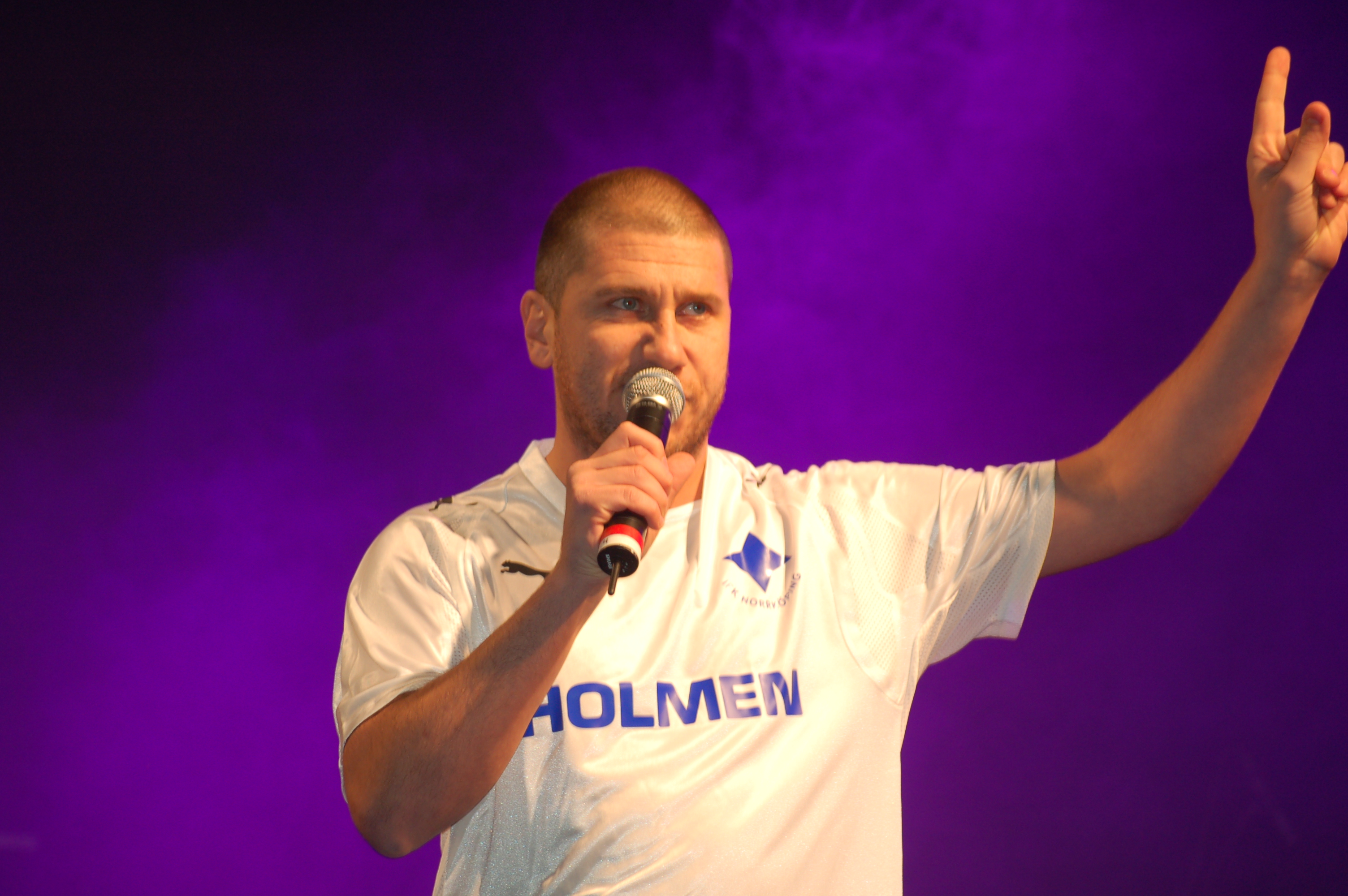
Markoolio (pictured in 2008) topped the Swedish singles chart with ten singles during the 2000s.

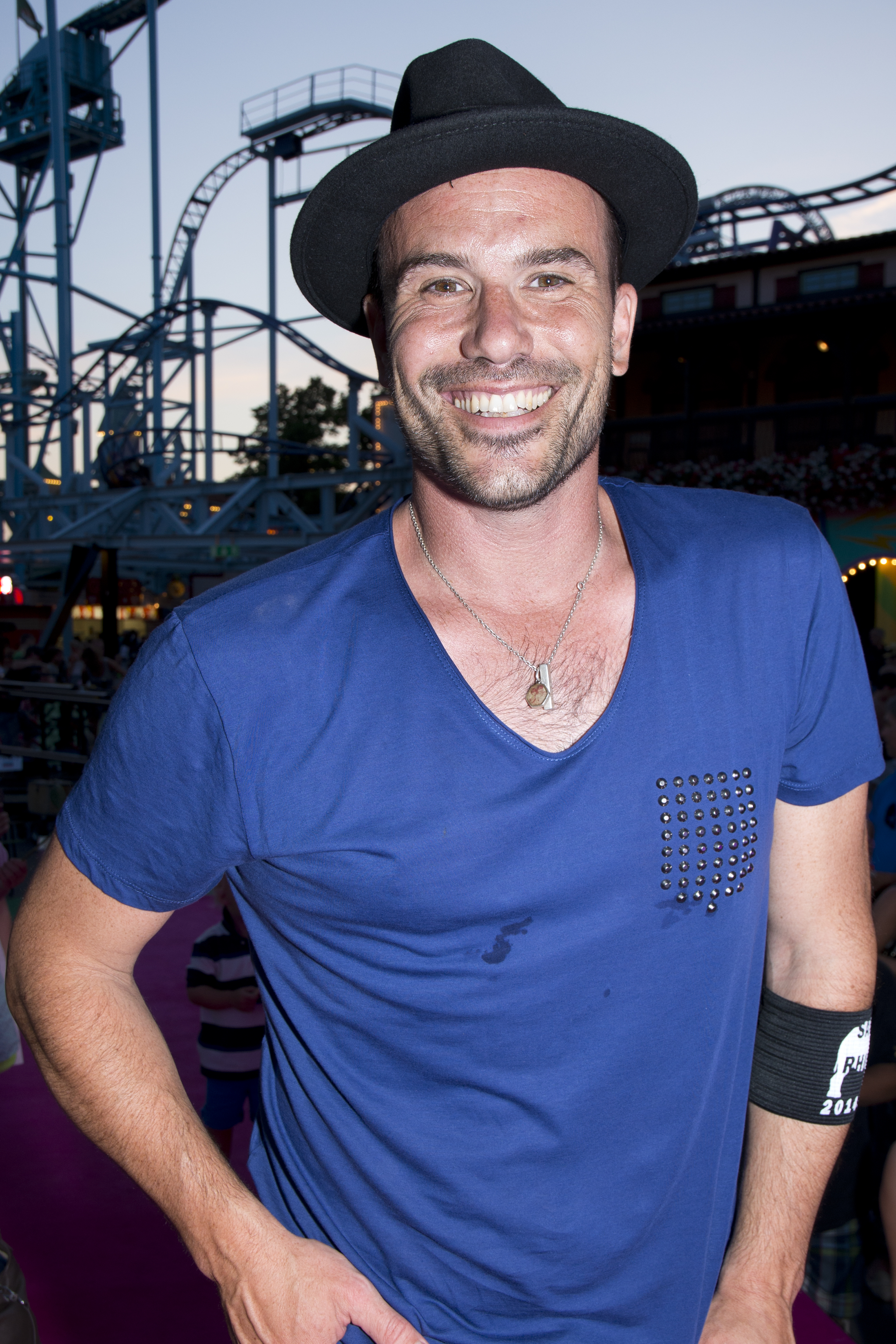
Martin Stenmarck (pictured in 2014) spend 16 weeks at number one with five singles during the 2000s.

Artist	Number-one singles	Weeks at number one
Alcazar	2	2
Britney Spears	4	5
Da Buzz	2	6
Danny Saucedo	3	5
Darin	3	8
E-Type	2	6
E.M.D.	4	15
Günther	3	5
The Sunshine Girls	2	4
Håkan Hellström	2	3
Helena Paparizou	2	5
James Blunt	2	9
Kent	6	10
Lady Gaga	2	8
Lars Winnerbäck	4	9
Madonna	4	8
Magnus Uggla	3	10
Markoolio	10	18
Martin Stenmarck	5	16
Melanie C	2	6
Ola	4	11
Outkast	2	3
Per Gessle	3	10
The Black Eyed Peas	3	8
