= Erik Segerstedt =

Swedish singer

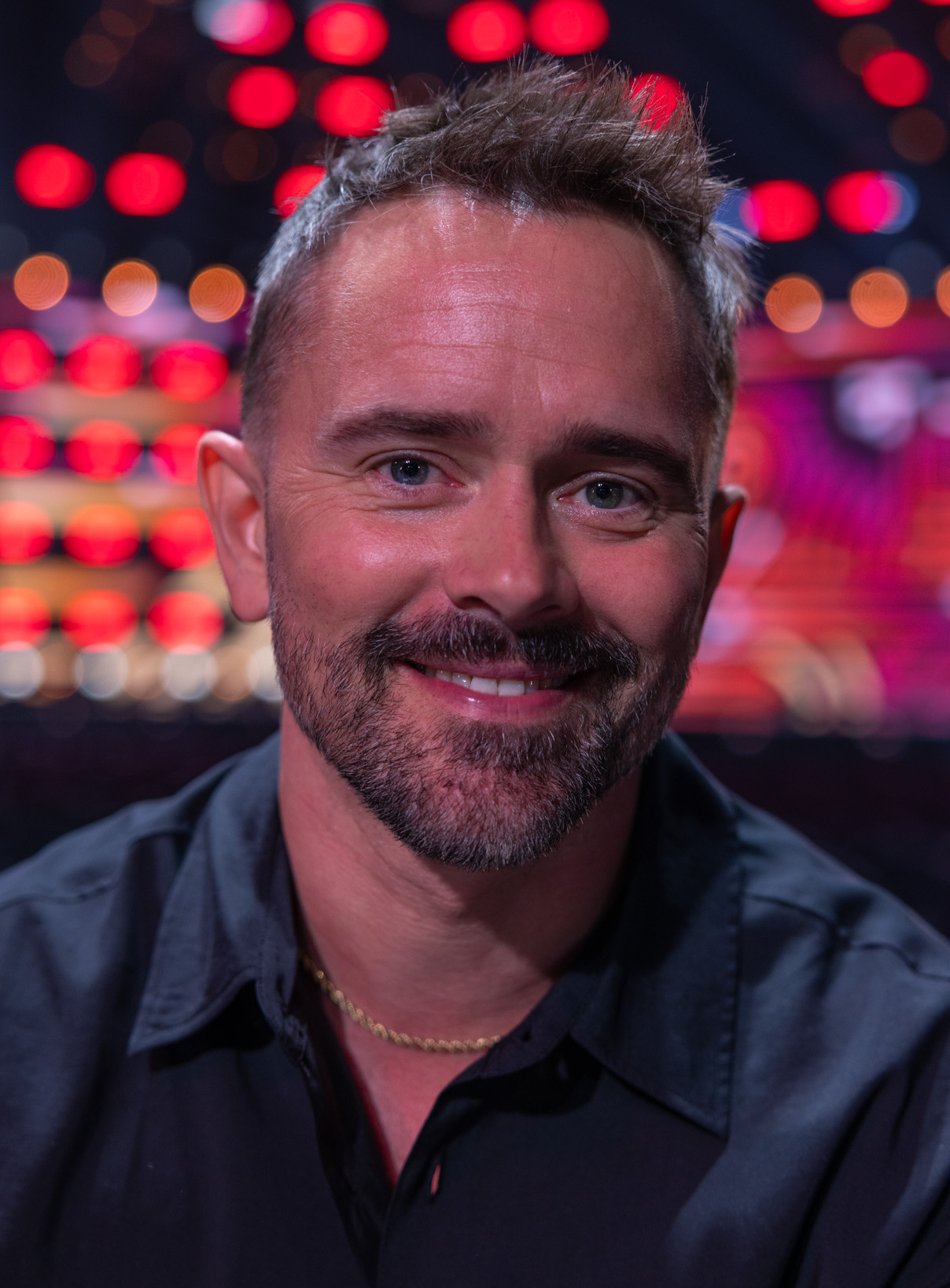
- Erik Segerstedt in Gothenburg in 2025

Background information
- Born: Mats Erik Segerstedt; 20 April 1983 (age 43)
- Origin: Uddevalla, Sweden
- Genres: Pop, rock
- Years active: 2006–present
- Label: Sony BMG
- Formerly of: E.M.D.

Mats Erik Segerstedt (born 20 April 1983) is a Swedish singer.

Segerstedt was born in Uddevalla. He was the runner-up to Markus Fagervall on the third season of Swedish version of Idol 2006.

Erik was part of the Swedish band E.M.D., alongside two other Idol contestants, Danny Saucedo from Idol 2006 and Mattias Andréasson from Idol 2007. The band took a break in late 2010.

Erik was a contestant in Let's Dance 2013. He also voiced Prince Hans in the Swedish dub of Disney's Frozen.

== Idol ==
Erik Segerstedt took part in Idol 2006, singing the following:

| Round | Song | Original artist | Theme |
|---|---|---|---|
| Audition | "Feeling Good" | Cy Grant | - |
| Final auditions | "Signed, Sealed, Delivered" | Stevie Wonder | Acapella |
| Final auditions | "You've Got A Friend | Carole King" | Duet (with Azra Osmancevic) |
| Final auditions | "Don't You (Forget About Me)" | Simple Minds | Solo song |
| Semifinal 4 | "Heaven" | Bryan Adams | - |
| Qualifying heat | "Home" | Michael Bublé | - |
| Final 1 | "Something Beautiful" | Robbie Williams | My Idol |
| Final 2 | "Känn ingen sorg för mig Göteborg" | Håkan Hellström | Swedish Hits |
| Final 3 | "I Don't Want to Be" | Gavin Degraw | Millennium Hits |
| Final 4 | "I Still Haven't Found What I'm Looking For" | U2 | Rock |
| Final 5 | "Against All Odds (Take a Look at Me Now)" | Phil Collins | Favorite from auditions round |
| Final 6 | "Knockin' On Heaven's Door" | Bob Dylan | Unplugged |
| Final 7 (first song) | "I Wish" | Stevie Wonder | Motown |
| Final 7 (second song) | "I Heard It Through The Grapevine" | Marvin Gaye | Motown |
| Final 8 (first song) | "If I Used To Love You" | Daniel Lemma | Love songs |
| Final 8 (second song) | "Bed Of Roses" | Bon Jovi | Love songs |
| Final 9 (first song) | "Right Here Waiting" | Richard Marx | Jury selection |
| Final 9 (second song) | "Crazy" | Gnarls Barkley | Jury selection |
| Final 10 (first song) | "The Show Must Go On" | Queen | Personal choice |
| Final 10 (second song) | "Bed of Roses" | Bon Jovi | Viewers' choice |
| Final 10 (third song) | "Everything Changes" | Jörgen Elofsson | Winning song |

After having reached the final, he finished as runner-up to winner Markus Fagervall after declaration of the results of the public vote.

== Post-Idol ==
Segerstedt was signed at Sony BMG and on 21 February 2007 his debut album A Different Shade was released. The album debuted at #2 on the Swedish albums chart and stayed at this position for a second week. The first single "I Can't say I'm Sorry" written by Andreas Carlsson peaked at #1 on Sverigetopplistan, the Swedish Singles Chart.

== E.M.D. ==
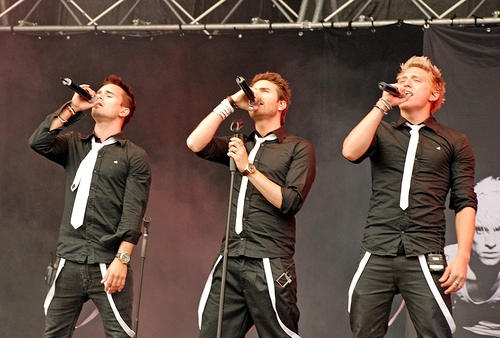
E.M.D. 2008

In 2007, Segerstedt formed the musical trio, a boyband called E.M.D., with Mattias Andréasson and Danny Saucedo. Like Segerstedt, both Andréasson and Saucedo had taken part in the Swedish version of Idol, with Danny Saucedo finishing 6th on Idol 2006 and Mattias Andréasson as the fourth runner-up on Idol 2007.

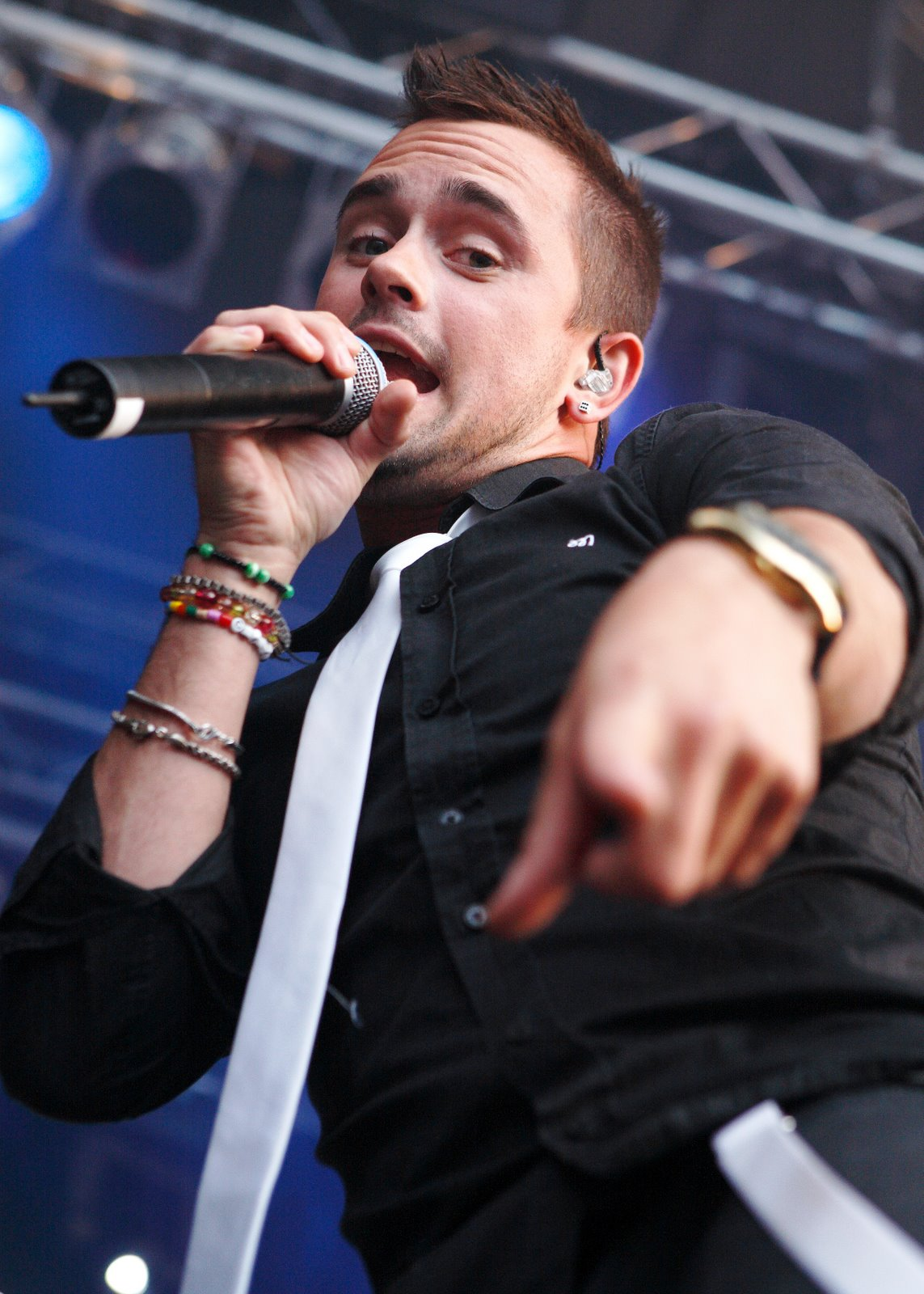
Erik Segerstedt in E.M.D.

Their first single, a cover of Bryan Adams, Rod Stewart and Sting's hit "All For Love", was a chart success. They released their debut album, A State of Mind, in May 2008 with "Jennie Let Me Love You" and "Alone)" as singles and, after the release of the deluxe album edition, the single "Baby Goodbye" which was their song on Melodifestivalen 2009, finishing third in the final of the competition.

In November 2009, E.M.D. released their holiday album Välkommen hem. The Christmas single charted at number 3 on Sverigetopplistan. E.M.D.'s third album Rewind was in 2010. The single "Save Tonight" a cover of an Eagle-Eye Cherry song charted at number 5.

In late 2010, E.M.D. announced an indefinite hiatus and broke up.

== Melodifestivalen ==
In 2013, Segerstedt entered Melodifestivalen 2013 with the duet "Hello Goodbye" with Tone Damli in a bid to represent Sweden in the Eurovision Song Contest. The duo came fourth in the second heat and qualified to the Second Chance round held where they finished in fifth place. They were therefore unable to reach the final and were eliminated from the competition.

Segerstedt participated in Melodifestivalen 2025 with the song "Show Me What Love Is". He won heat 2 on 8 February 2025 to qualified directly to the final on 8 March 2025, where he placed ninth.

== Discography ==
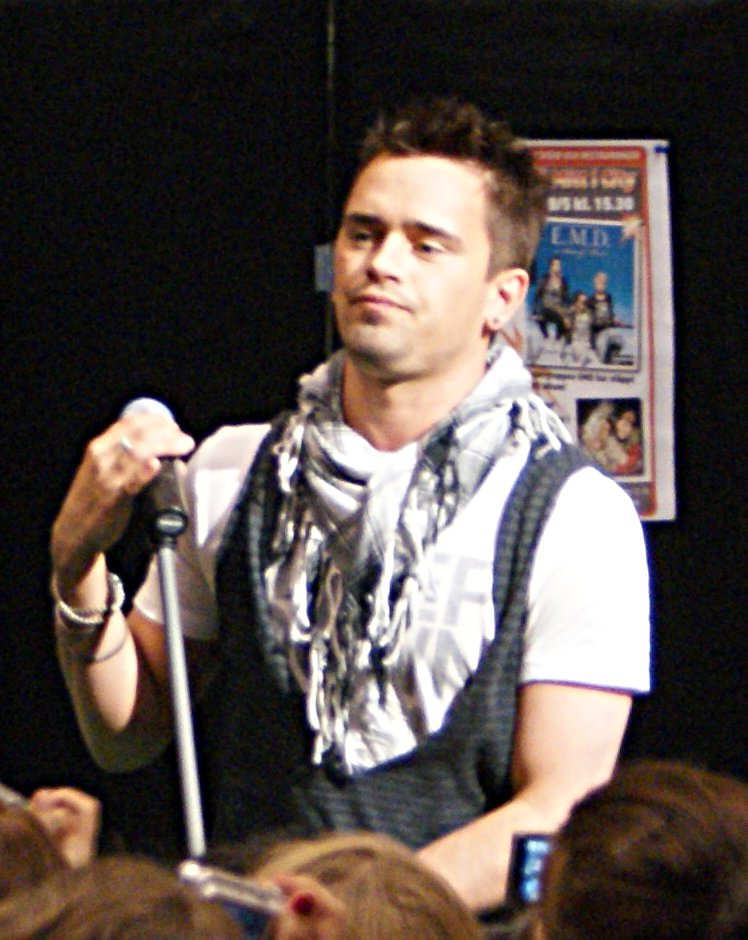
Erik Segerstedt

=== Solo work ===
==== Studio albums ====
| Year | Album | Peak positions | Certification |
| Year | Album | SWE | Certification |
|---|---|---|---|
| 2007 | A Different Shade | 2 | GLF: Gold |

==== Singles ====
| Title | Year | Peak chart positions | Certification | Album |
| Title | Year | SWE | Certification | Album |
|---|---|---|---|---|
| "I Don't Want to Be" | 2006 | 28 | | Idol 2006 performance Det Bästa Från Idol 2006 |
| "I Can't Say I'm Sorry" | 2007 | 1 | GLF: Gold | A Different Shade |
| "How Did We Change?" | 2007 | — | | A Different Shade |
| "Saturday Night" | 2009 | 16 | | Non-album single |
| "Hello Goodbye" (with Tone Damli) | 2013 | 14 | | Melodifestivalen 2013 |
| "Show Me What Love Is" | 2025 | 9 | | Non-album singles |
| "Happier Now" | 2025 | — | | Non-album singles |

=== E.M.D. ===
Studio albums

- 2008: A State of Mind
  - 2009: A State of Mind (Deluxe Edition)
- 2009: Välkommen hem
- 2010: Rewind

Singles

- 2007: "All for Love"
- 2008: "Jennie Let Me Love You"
- 2008: "Alone"
- 2009: "Baby Goodbye"
- 2009: "Youngblood"
- 2009: "Välkommen hem
- 2010: "Save Tonight"
- 2010: "What Is Love"
