= Danny Saucedo =

Swedish singer-songwriter (born 1986)

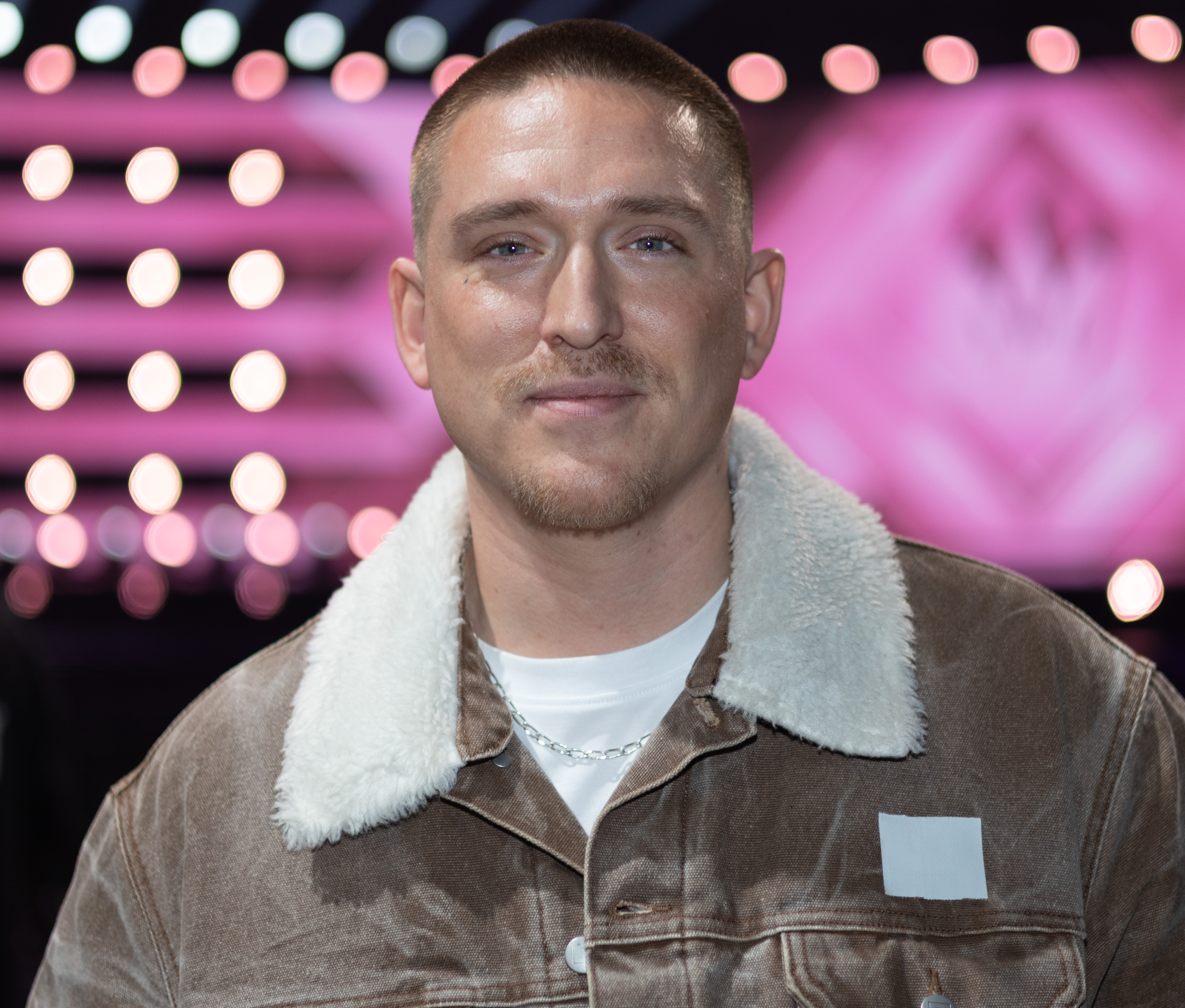
- Saucedo in 2024

Background information
- Born: Daniel Gabriel Alessandro Saucedo Grzechowski Mora; 25 February 1986 (age 40); Stockholm, Sweden
- Genres: Pop; europop; dance
- Occupations: singer; songwriter
- Instrument: Vocals
- Years active: 2006–present

Daniel Gabriel Alessandro Saucedo Grzechowski (born 25 February 1986), known professionally as Danny Saucedo or simply Danny, is a Swedish singer and songwriter. He rose to fame as one of the finalists in Idol 2006, the Swedish version of Idol, where he reached the top six.

Saucedo has released five studio albums and more than fifteen singles as a solo artist. His debut album Heart Beats and its three singles "Tokyo", "Play It for the Girls" and "Radio" topped the Swedish charts. He was simultaneously a member of Swedish pop trio E.M.D. with Erik Segerstedt and Mattias Andréasson, which was active between 2007 and 2010. The trio released three albums and eleven singles (of which one album and four singles topped the Swedish charts). He has competed in Melodifestivalen five times, every time as both artist and songwriter. In 2009 E.M.D. finished third with "Baby Goodbye" and as a solo artist he finished second in 2011 with "In the Club", as well as in 2012 with "Amazing". He returned in 2021 with "Dandi dansa", qualifying direct to the final for a third time as a solo artist and finishing in seventh place in the final, and in 2024 with "Happy That You Found Me" when he also qualified directly for the final.

== Personal life ==
Saucedo was born in Stockholm to a Polish father and a Bolivian mother. As a student he attended the Adolf Fredrik's Music School in Stockholm. He speaks fluent English, Polish and French in addition to his native Spanish and Swedish. Saucedo is a practicing Catholic.

Saucedo was in a relationship with Swedish singer Molly Sandén from 2013 to 2019, they were engaged in 2016. As of February 2020, Saucedo was in a relationship with model Anna Eriksson.

== Career ==
=== 2006: Idol and beginnings ===
Auditions

Danny embarked on his journey in Idol 2006 by auditioning with the song "I Swear" by the vocal quartet All-4-One. He was praised by the jury for his touching and convincing voice. Day joined fellow contestant Felicia Brandström in a duet, singing Bryan Adams' "(Everything I Do) I Do It for You", which according to the jury was the best performance so far in the Idol contest. The jury was unanimous in its opinion that if both were to continue at that level of that performance, they would easily end up in the Idol final. The jury's comments were harsh after Danny's performance of Nick Lachey's single "What's Left Of Me" in the Idol 2006 semi-finals, however, as they claimed his voice did not suit this song. In the top 11 finals, Danny sang The Jacksons' "Blame It on the Boogie" while doing some Michael Jackson moves. In the top 10 finals, Danny stormed the stage and made jury member Kishti Tomita weep in tears, while Danny sang the ballad "Öppna din dörr" by Swedish singer Tommy Nilsson.

Performances

Round	Song	Original artist	Theme
Audition	"I Swear"	All-4-One	-
Final audition	"No One Else Comes Close"	Joe	
Final audition	"(Everything I Do) I Do It for You"	Bryan Adams	Duet (with Felicia Brandström)
Final audition	"Isn't She Lovely"	Stevie Wonder	-
Qualifying round	"What's Left of Me"	Nick Lachey	-
Final 1	"Blame It on the Boogie"	The Jacksons	My Idol
Final 2	"Öppna din dörr"	Tommy Nilsson	Swedish Hits
Final 3	"So Sick"	Ne-Yo	Hits from the 2000s
Final 4	"Sweet Child o' Mine"	Guns N' Roses	Rock
Final 5	"Lately"	Stevie Wonder	Favourite from auditions
Final 6	"End of the Road"	Boyz II Men	Acoustic

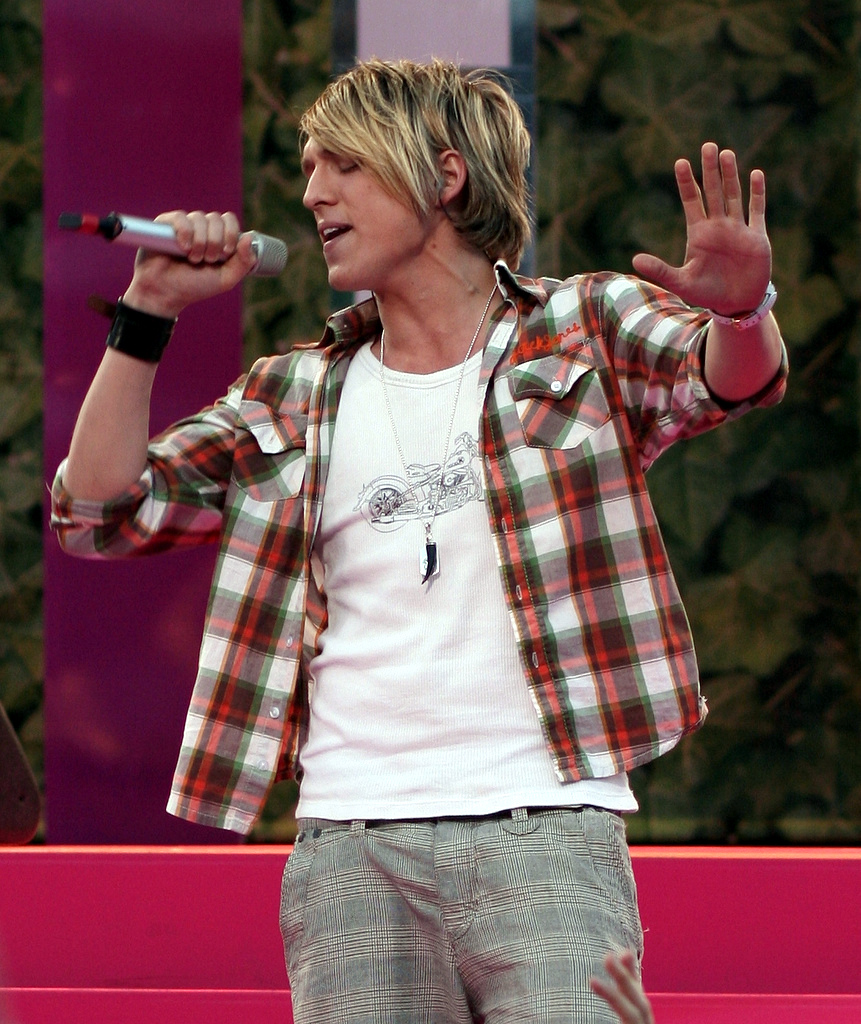
Danny Saucedo at Gröna Lund in 2007

In 2006, after end of the Idol season, he released his first single, a cover of "Öppna din dörr", a song by Tommy Nilsson. The debut single charted at No. 24 on the Swedish Singles Chart.

=== 2007–2011: E.M.D. ===
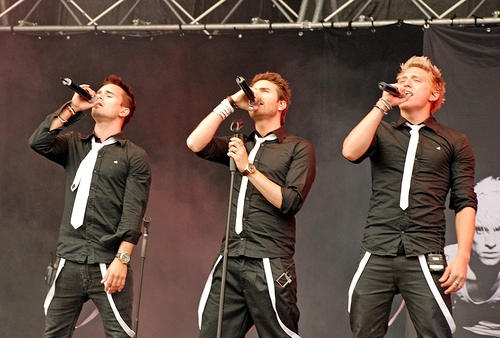
E.M.D. 2008

Danny formed with previous Idol contestants Erik Segerstedt & Mattias Andréasson the Swedish pop band E.M.D., at the same time putting his solo output as well. Both Erik Segerstedt and Danny Saucedo had released successful solo albums, the first with his A Different Shade and the second with his album Heart Beats, during the Autumn of 2007, they formed alongside Mattias Andréasson the Swedish trio E.M.D. Their first single, a cover of Bryan Adams, Rod Stewart and Sting's hit "All For Love" rose to third place on Hitlistan. "All for Love" charted on Swedish national record chart immediately. The follow-up was a debut album, A State of Mind, in May 2008. The album debuted at No. 1 on the Swedish Album Chart and produced three additional domestic chart topping singles after "All for Love", being "Jennie Let Me Love You", "Alone" and, after the deluxe album edition, the single "Baby Goodbye".

E.M.D participated in the 2009 Melodifestivalen with the track "Baby Goodbye", making it to the final, where they finished third. In November 2009 E.M.D. released their second album and first holiday album, Välkommen hem, containing Swedish Christmas music and the album's first and only single, Välkommen Hem, (originally sung by Magnus Carlsson) was released on 13 November 2009. E.M.D. finished the studio recording of their second studio album and third album overall entitled Rewind in 2010. The band released the first single from the album, "Save Tonight", a cover of a song by Eagle-Eye Cherry, followed by "What Is Love", a cover of a song by Haddaway, in 2010. The album was released on 3 December 2010 with the release of the "There's a Place for Us" as the album's third single. In late 2010, the band announced an indefinite breakup.

=== 2007–2014: Solo career, new albums and Melodifestivalen ===
Saucedo was a contestant on the television show Let's Dance 2008 (Swedish version of Dancing with the Stars). In September 2008, Saucedo along with professional dancer Jeanette Carlsson, took part in the Eurovision Dance Contest 2008. The couple placed 12th in the final on September 6 in Glasgow. In October 2008 Danny revealed that he would be back with a new album in early 2009 and that the first single from it would be "Radio", which had been released top radio for airplay. The track was written by Michel Striton, who composed the song "If Only You", from the album Heart Beats. Danny's new album "Set Your Body Free" was released on Christmas Eve 2008 in Sweden. He later appeared in the music video for "Victorious", by Velvet and Linda Bengtzing. Furthermore, Saucedo participated in Melodifestivalen 2011 as a solo artist, singing the song "In the Club". He qualified for the final that was held on 12 March 2011 and came second in votes to the winning song "Popular" by Eric Saade. Danny garnered 149 points to Saade's 193 points. He later presented the Swedish votes at finals of Eurovision Song Contest 2011. In 2012, he made a return to the Melodifestivalen 2012 for another chance to represent Sweden at the Eurovision Song Contest 2012 with the song "Amazing". He performed on the semi-final 4, on 25 February and later on advanced into the finals. However, in the finals, he came in second place again to the winning song "Euphoria" by Loreen. Saucedo had garnered 198 points to Loreen's 268 points. In 2013, he hosted Melodifestivalen 2013 with Gina Dirawi. Saucedo has also been active as a songwriter and has composed songs for Alcazar and Pulse.

=== 2015–present: Så mycket bättre and touring ===
In 2016, Saucedo participated in the Swedish TV-show Så mycket bättre, which was broadcast on TV4. Having scored more than 13 Top 40 hits in his native Sweden, he was well fit for the show, since the show's general premise is that each artist is supposed to make their own version of other artist's well known songs. Saucedo participated in the show again in 2019. He has in recent years been touring in Sweden, most recently with "The Run(A)way Show", which received acclaim from critics. In March 2020, some of Saucedo's shows had to be canceled, due to the amid arising concerns regarding the COVID-19 pandemic.

He participated in Melodifestivalen 2021, when he qualified for the finale, held on 13 March 2021. He finished in seventh place with 74 points; 39 points from the international juries and 35 points from televoting.

He participated in Melodifestivalen 2024 with "Happy That You Found Me"; he came first in his heat on 24 February 2024, qualifying for the final.

== Discography ==
=== Albums ===
Title	Details	Peak chart positions	Certifications
Title	Details	SWE	Certifications
Heart Beats	Released: 30 May 2007; Label: Sony; Format: digital download, CD	1	
Set Your Body Free	Released: 24 December 2008; Label: Ariola, Sony; Format: digital download, CD	2	GLF: Gold
In the Club	Released: 11 March 2011; Label: Sony; Format: digital download, CD	3	
Hör vad du säger men har glömt vad du sa	Released: 20 November 2015; Label: Chiliboy Music; Format: digital download, CD	3	GLF: Gold
Så mycket bättre – Tolkningarna	Released: 11 December 2016; Label: Chiliboy Music; Format: digital download	1	

=== Singles ===
Title	Year	Peak position				Certifications	Album
Title	Year	SWE	FIN	TUR	EUR	Certifications	Album
"Öppna din dörr"	2006	24	—	—	—		Det bästa från Idol 2006
"Tokyo"	2007	1	9	—	—	GLF: Platinum	Heart Beats
"Play It for the Girls"	2007	1	—	—	34	GLF: Gold	Heart Beats
"If Only You" (with Therese Grankvist)	2007	3	9	—	73		Heart Beats
"Hey (I've Been Feeling Kind of Lonely)"	2007	—	—	—	—		Heart Beats
"Radio"	2008	1	—	132	—		Set Your Body Free
"Need to Know"	2008	—	—	—	—		Set Your Body Free
"All on You"	2008	—	—	—	—		Set Your Body Free
"Emely" (with Sasha Strunin)	2008	—	—	—	—		Set Your Body Free
"Just Like That" (with Lazee)	2008	—	—	—	—		Set Your Body Free
"In Your Eyes"	2011	—	—	—	—		In the Club
"In the Club"	2011	2	—	41	—	GLF: Platinum	In the Club
"Tonight"	2011	—	—	—	—		In the Club
"Amazing"	2012	2	—	70	—	GLF: 3× Platinum	Non-album singles
"All in My Head"	2012	—	—	121	—		Non-album singles
"I Can See Myself in You" (with Tommy Körberg)	2012	—	—	—	—		Non-album singles
"Delirious"	2012	—	—	—	—		Non-album singles
"Todo el Mundo (Dancing in the Streets)"	2013	—	—	50	—		Non-album singles
"Brinner i bröstet" (featuring Malcolm B)	2015	14	—	—	—	GLF: 3× Platinum	Hör vad du säger men har glömt vad du sa
"Dör för dig"	2015	2	—	—	—	GLF: 4× Platinum	Hör vad du säger men har glömt vad du sa
"Så som i himlen" (featuring Tensta Gospel)	2015	27	—	—	—	GLF: Platinum	Hör vad du säger men har glömt vad du sa
"Hör vad du säger men jag har glömt vad du sa"	2016	66	—	—	—		Hör vad du säger men har glömt vad du sa
"Snacket på stan"	2016	5	—	—	—	GLF: 2× Platinum	Så mycket bättre – Tolkningarna
"Se mig"	2016	52	—	—	—		Så mycket bättre – Tolkningarna
"Skepp"	2016	46	—	—	—	GLF: Gold	Så mycket bättre – Tolkningarna
"Super 8"	2016	2	—	—	—	GLF: Platinum	Så mycket bättre – Tolkningarna
"Öppna upp dit fönster"	2016	82	—	—	—		Så mycket bättre – Tolkningarna
"För kärlekens skull"	2016	35	—	—	—	GLF: Gold	Så mycket bättre – Tolkningarna
"Jag får inte nog"	2017	71	—	—	—		Non-album singles
"Dansa med mig"	2017	— (Note: "Dansa med mig" did not enter the Sverigetopplistan singles chart, but peaked at number five on the Sverigetopplistan Heatseekers chart.)	—	—	—		Non-album singles
"Undantag" (featuring Linda Pira)	2018	71	—	—	—		Non-album singles
"Tänker på mig" (with Black Moose and Einár)	2019	20	—	—	—		Non-album singles
"Hon är min" (with Erik Segerstedt and Mattias Andréasson)	2019	21	—	—	—		Så mycket bättre
"Du vet att jag gråter"	2019	56	—	—	—		Så mycket bättre
"De ba livet"	2019	82	—	—	—		Så mycket bättre
"Ere bara jag"	2020	42	—	—	—		Non-album singles
"Kungar av december" (with Niello)	2020	— (Note: "Kungar av december" did not enter the Sverigetopplistan singles chart, but peaked at number fourteen on the Sverigetopplistan Heatseekers chart.)	—	—	—		Non-album singles
"Dandi dansa"	2021	7	—	—	—		Non-album singles
"Fan va har vi gjort..." (with Sabina Ddumba)	2021	19	—	—	—		Non-album singles
"Om igen"	2021	— (Note: "Om igen" did not enter the Swedish Singellista Chart, but peaked at number two on the Swedish Heatseeker Chart.)	—	—	—		Non-album singles
"Har du sett henne i blått"	2023	— (Note: "Har du sett henne i blått" did not enter the Swedish Singellista Chart, but peaked at number one on the Swedish Heatseeker Chart.)	—	—	—		Non-album singles
"Happy That You Found Me"	2024	10	—	—	—		Non-album singles
"Be Ok" (with Bellman)	2024	—	—	—	—		
"—" denotes a recording that did not chart or was not released.

=== As part of E.M.D. ===
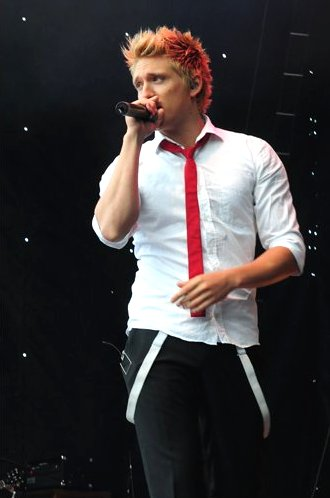
Danny Saucedo performing at an E.M.D. concert

E.M.D. broke up in late 2010.

==== Albums ====
- 2008: A State of Mind
- 2009: A State of Mind (Deluxe Edition)
- 2009: Välkommen hem
- 2010: Rewind

==== Singles ====
- 2007: "All for Love"
- 2008: "Jennie Let Me Love You"
- 2008: "Alone"
- 2009: "Baby Goodbye"
- 2009: "Youngblood"
- 2009: "Välkommen hem"
- 2010: "Save Tonight"
- 2010: "What Is Love" (Cover of Haddaway's original)
