= Körslaget 2008/09 =

- Körslaget 2008/09-contestants (date = knocked out)
- 2008/09
Hanna Hedlund	Winner
Erik Segerstedt	31 January
Magnus Carlsson	24 January
Robert Wells	17 January
Nanne Grönvall	10 January
LaGaylia Frazier	3 January
Timo Räisänen	27 December

Körslaget 2008/09 Was the second season of TV4's entertainment show Körslaget. It first aired on 26 December 2008.

== Competitors ==
- Hanna Hedlund With a choir from Bollnäs
- Erik Segerstedt With a choir from Uddevalla
- Magnus Carlsson With a choir from Borås
- Robert Wells With a choir from Falkenberg
- Nanne Grönvall With a choir from Stockholm
- LaGaylia Frazier With a choir from Sundsvall
- Timo Räisänen With a choir from Gothenburg

=== Episode 1 ===
Aired 26 December 2008

1. Team Erik - Mercy (Duffy)
2. Team Nanne - Delilah (Tom Jones)
3. Team LaGaylia - September (Earth, Wind & Fire)
4. Team Timo - Stanna hos mig (Kent)
5. Team Hanna - I Don't Feel Like Dancin' (Scissor Sisters)
6. Team Magnus - I Will Survive (Gloria Gaynor)
7. Team Wells - Let Me Entertain You (Robbie Williams)

=== Episode 2 ===
Aired 27 December 2008

1. Team Wells - Highway To Hell (AC/DC)
2. Team Hanna - As Good As New (ABBA)
3. Team Erik - Glorious (Andreas Johnson)
4. Team Timo - Da Doo Ron Ron (The Crystals)
5. Team LaGaylia - I Wish (Stevie Wonder)
6. Team Magnus - Blame It On The Boogie (Jackson 5)
7. Team Nanne - I Can Jive (Jerry Williams)

Results

- Team Timo, Eliminated
- Team Erik

=== Episode 3 ===
Aired 3 January 2009

1. Team Magnus - Get the Party Started (Pink)
2. Team LaGaylia - Kiss (Prince)
3. Team Erik - Apologize (OneRepublic)
4. Team Nanne - Black or White (Michael Jackson)
5. Team Wells - Dead Ringer for Love (Meat Loaf featuring Cher)
6. Team Hanna - Don't Stop Me Now (Queen)

Results

- Team LaGaylia, Eliminated
- Team Nanne

=== Episode 4 ===
Aired 10 January 2009

1. Team Erik - Jennie Let Me Love You (E.M.D)
2. Team Nanne - Whole Lotta Shakin' Goin' On (Jerry Lee Lewis)
3. Team Magnus - Kom hem (Barbados)
4. Team Hanna - Gabriellas sång (Helen Sjöholm)
5. Team Wells - Saturday Night's Alright (Elton John)

Results

- Team Nanne, Eliminated
- Team Hanna

=== Episode 5 ===
Aired 17 January 2009

Round 1

1. Team Hanna - So What (Pink)
2. Team Wells - Heaven's on Fire (Kiss)
3. Team Erik - Grace Kelly (Mika)
4. Team Magnus - Daddy Cool (Boney M)

Round 2

1. Team Hanna - Shake Your Tailfeather (Blues Brothers)
2. Team Wells - Candyman (Christina Aguilera)
3. Team Erik - Signed, Sealed, Delivered I'm Yours (Stevie Wonder)
4. Team Magnus - La Dolce Vita (After Dark)

Results

- Team Wells, Eliminated
- Team Magnus

=== Episode 6 ===
Aired 24 January 2009

Round 1

1. Team Magnus - Kom Igen Lena (Håkan Hellström)
2. Team Erik - Kärleken är evig (Lena Philipsson)
3. Team Hanna - Efterfest (Magnus Uggla)

Round 2

1. Team Magnus - Does Your Mother Know (ABBA)
2. Team Erik - No Air (Jordin Sparks feat. Chris Brown)
3. Team Hanna - I Got Life (Hair)

Results

- Team Magnus, Eliminated
- Team Hanna

=== Episode 7 - (Finale) ===
Aired 31 January 2009

Round 1 (Own choice)

1. Team Erik - Vingar (Mikael Rickfors)
2. Team Hanna - Genom Eld och Vatten (Sarek)

Round 2 (The viewers choice)

1. Team Erik - Jennie Let Me Love You (E.M.D)
2. Team Hanna - Gabriellas sång (Helen Sjöholm)

Round 3 (Shared Song)

1. Team Erik - Nessun Dorma (Turandot)
2. Team Hanna - Nessun Dorma (Turandot)

Winners: Team Hanna

== Elimination chart ==
Finals
Weeks:		03/29	04/5	04/12	04/19	04/26	05/3	05/10
Place	Contestant	Result						
1	Hanna Hedlund	SAFE	SAFE	SAFE	Btm 2	SAFE	Btm 2	Winner
2	Erik Segerstedt	SAFE	Btm 2	SAFE	SAFE	SAFE	SAFE	Runner-up
3	Magnus Carlsson	SAFE	SAFE	SAFE	SAFE	Btm 2	ELIM	
4	Robert Wells	SAFE	SAFE	SAFE	SAFE	ELIM		
5	Nanne Grönvall	SAFE	SAFE	Btm 2	ELIM			
6	LaGaylia Frazier	SAFE	SAFE	ELIM				
7	Timo Räisänen	SAFE	ELIM					
