= Set Your Body Free =

Studio album by Danny
- Released: 24 December 2008
- Recorded: 2008
- Genre: Pop, dance, europop
- Length: 45:37
- Label: Ariola Records/Sony Music
- Producer: Michel Zitron, Tobias Gustavsson, The Attic, Oscar Gorres

Danny chronology
Heart Beats (2007)	Set Your Body Free (2008)	In The Club (2011)

Singles from Set Your Body Free
- 1. "Radio" Released: 8 December 2008; 2. "Need To Know" Released: 2008; 3. "All On You" Released: 2009; 4. "Emely" Released: 2009

Professional ratings
Review scores
Source	Rating
Aftonbladet	3/5 stars
Gefle Dagblad	3/5 stars

Set Your Body Free is the second solo album by Swedish pop/dance singer Danny Saucedo. It was released on 24 December 2008. The first single "Radio" reached number one on the Swedish Single Chart, where it remained for two weeks. The album was released by Sony Music. The single "Need to Know" peaked att number 39 on the chart, while "All on you" peaked at number 17. The single "Emely" did not enter the chart.

== Track listing ==
Credits adapted from Spotify.

No.	Title	Writer(s)	Length
1.	"Radio"	Michel Zirton; Niclas Kings; Danny Saucedo	3:00
2.	"Kiss You All over"	Carl Falk; T. Ottoh; H. Bell	3:37
3.	"Emely (With Sasha Strunin)"	A. Aly; Henrik Wilkström	3:03
4.	"Utopia"	Andreas Carlsson; Kalle Engström	3:47
5.	"All On You"	Michael Feiner; Eric Amarillo	3:08
6.	"Unite This Heart"	Gustavsson; Michael Zitron; Saucedo	3:30
7.	"Need To Know"	J. Tornqvist; T. Skyldeberg; Saucedo	2:52
8.	"Set Your Body Free"	M. Wallo; Taio Cruz; A. James	3:54
9.	"Running Away"	Oscar Goress; Saucedo	3:48
10.	"Schitzofrenia"	H. Andersson- Tervald; M. Clauss	3:06
11.	"Turn Off The Sound"	Goress; Saucedo	3:51
12.	"Just Like That (feat. Lazee)"	Alexander Jonsson; C. Vikberg; Saucedo; Lazee	3:08
13.	"If Only You (feat. Therese)" (Bonus Track)	Zitron; S. Somajo; V. Pontare	3:30
14.	"Tokyo" (Bonus Track)	J. Von der Burg; A. Bhagavan; N. Von der Burg	3:16
Total length:			45:37

== Critical reception ==
The album received generally mixed reviews from Swedish music critics. Jenny Seth of Aftonbladet gave the album a positive review, calling it one of the best albums of the year (2008). She praised the production as well as the energy that Saucedo expresses on the album. Writing for Gefle Dagblad, Mikael Forsell praised Saucedo for his interpretation of the Disco genre on the album, although saying that some songs didn't have the same "high class" as other songs on the record.

== Release history ==
The album was released on Christmas Eve 2008 in Sweden both digitally and physically.

Region	Date	Label	Format	Version
Sweden	December 24, 2008	Ariola/Sony BMG Sweden	CD	Original
Sweden	December 24, 2008	Sony BMG Sweden	Digital download	Original

== Chart performance ==
The album debuted at number two on the Swedish Albums Chart upon release. After its entering, it remained for 4 more weeks charting at 36, 50, 51 & 52, respectively.

Chart	Country	Provider(s)	Peak position	Certification
Swedish Albums Chart	Sweden	IFPI	2	Gold
