= Mattias Andréasson =

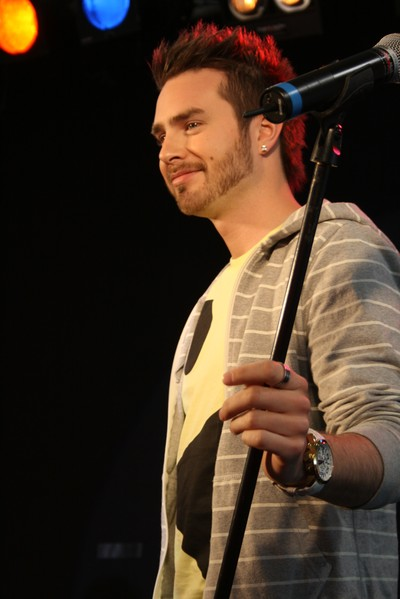

Background information
- Also known as: dmaSOUL
- Born: 29 March 1981 (age 44); Västerås, Sweden
- Genres: Pop, R&B, Soul
- Formerly of: E.M.D. (2007–2010)

Mattias Andréasson (born 29 March 1981), also known as dmaSOUL, is a Swedish singer known for participating in Swedish Idol 2007, in which he came in the 5th place. As a student, he attended the Adolf Fredrik's Music School in Stockholm. He was part of Swedish band E.M.D., which was active between 2007 and 2010.

== Idol ==
For his first audition in Idol 2007, Mattias sang the Musiq Soulchild hit Just Friends. During the Qualifying week he sang Never Again by Justin Timberlake, and Again by Lenny Kravitz.

| Round | Song | Original artist | Theme |
|---|---|---|---|
| Audition | Just Friends | Soulchilds | - |
| Final audition | Man in the Mirror | Artis/Band | Solo song |
| Qualifying Semi-final (first song) | Never Again | Justin Timberlake | - |
| Qualifying Semi-final (second song) | Again | Lenny Kravitz | - |
| Final 1 | Would I Lie to You Baby | Charles & Eddie | One hit wonders |
| Final 2 | Your Song | Elton John | Music from movies |
| Final 3 | Summerlove | Justin Timberlake | Hit song |
| Final 4 | Heal the world | Michael Jackson | Inspiring songs |
| Final 5 | If I Could Turn Back Time | Cher | Love song |
| Final 6 | This Is It | Melba Moore | Disco |
| Final 7 | World's Greatest | R. Kelly | Gospel |

Mattias was voted out of Idol on 16 November 2007, finishing 5th overall.

== After Idol ==
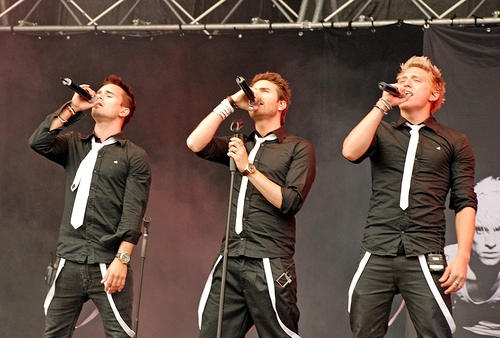
Mattias Andréasson (center) in E.M.D trio in 2008

Andréasson's version of Elton John's "Your Song" was released as a single and reached 48th place on the Swedish Singles Chart.

In E.M.D.

During Autumn 2007, he formed Swedish trio E.M.D., with previous Idol contestants Erik Segerstedt and Danny Saucedo. Their first single, a cover of Bryan Adams, Rod Stewart and Sting's hit "All For Love", rose to 3rd place on Hitlistan on 20 December of the same year. The band broke up in late 2010.

In Melodifestivalen 2012

Mattias Andréasson took part in Melodifestivalen 2012, a preliminary round to pick the representative of Sweden in the 2012 Eurovision Song Contest in Baku, by singing the song "Förlåt mig" (meaning Forgive Me in Swedish) written by him. He sang it in the third semi-final, held on 18 February 2012 in Tegera Arena, Leksand, but he did not qualify for the final.

== Discography ==
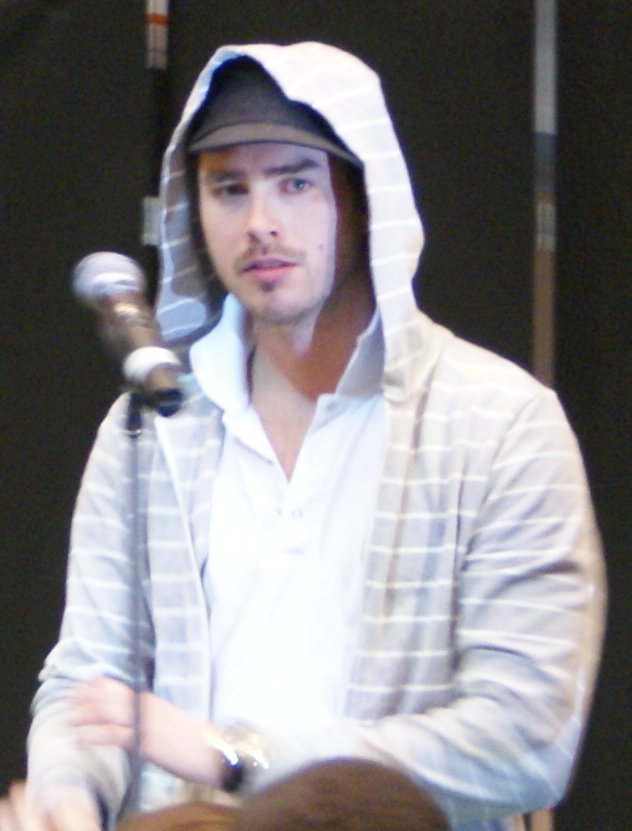
Mattias Andréasson in Karlstad 2008

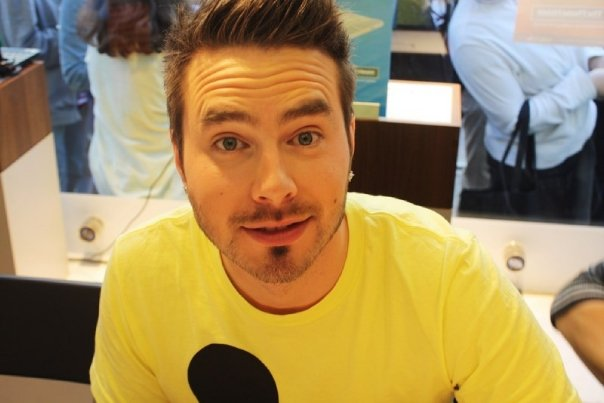
Mattias Andréasson

=== Studio albums ===
- 2008: A State of Mind
  - 2009: A State of Mind (Deluxe Edition)
- 2009: Välkommen hem
- 2010: Rewind

=== Solo ===
| Title | Year | Peak chart positions | Certifications | Album |
| Title | Year | SWE | Certifications | Album |
|---|---|---|---|---|
| "Your Song" | 2007 | 48 | | Non-album singles |
| "Förlåt mig" | 2012 | 41 | | Non-album singles |
| "Bara för ikväll (Du är så baby)" | 2013 | — | | Non-album singles |
| "Moment 22" (with Albin) | 2014 | — | | Din soldat EP and Dyra tårar |
| "Frank" (with Albin) | 2015 | 26 | GLF: Platinum | Frank EP and Dyra tårar |
| "Rik" (with Albin) | 2016 | 19 | GLF: Platinum | Non-album single |
"—" denotes a single that did not chart or was not released in that territory.
