= In the Club (disambiguation) =

In the Club is a British television series about pregnant women.

In the Club may also refer to:

- "In the Club" (song), by Danny Saucedo, 2011
- "In the Club", a 2009 song by 2NE1 from 2NE1
- "In the Club", a 2011 single by Spanish artist Dareysteel
- "In the Club", a 2006 single by US5

== See also ==
- "In da Club", 2003 single by 50 Cent
