= Rewind (E.M.D. album) =

Studio album by E.M.D.
- Released: December 3, 2010
- Recorded: 2008–2010
- Genres: Pop, pop rock
- Label: Sony Music Entertainment

E.M.D. chronology
| Välkommen hem (2009) | Rewind (2010) |

Singles from Rewind
- 1. "Save Tonight" Released: May 28, 2010; 2. "What Is Love?" Released: October 24, 2010; 3. "There's a Place for Us" Released: December 5, 2010

Rewind is the third and final studio album released by Swedish boy band E.M.D. The album was released on December 3, 2010. As of December 5, 2010 the album had spawned the three hit singles "Save Tonight" (original by Eagle-Eye Cherry), "What Is Love?" (original by Haddaway) and "There's a Place for Us" (original by Carrie Underwood), all of them being cover songs.

== Background ==
The group started working on songs for the new album since the release of their debut album A State of Mind (considering that their second album Välkommen hem from 2009 was a Christmas album). They entered the studio in the beginning of 2010 to start recording their new studio album entitled Rewind and released it on December 3, 2010.

== Singles ==
The lead single "Save Tonight" (original by Eagle-Eye Cherry) was released on May 30, 2010. It debuted on the Swedish charts at 5, but climbed to 3 and stayed there for 11 weeks. Until December 2010 it has been the only single from the album to chart. A music video featuring the band performing and recording the song in the studio followed on July 22, 2010.

The second single "What Is Love?" (original by Haddaway) was released on October 24, 2010. No music video was shot for the single.

The third single "There's a Place for Us" (original by Carrie Underwood) was released only two days after the release of Rewind on December 5, 2010 with a music video following the same day. "There's a Place for Us" is the album's thirteenth and final track, as well as the only bonus track on the album. The song is featured as the main theme song in the Swedish version of both the motion picture and soundtrack for The Chronicles of Narnia: The Voyage of the Dawn Treader.

== Track listing ==
1. "You and Me Song"
2. "Ironic"
3. "Save Tonight"
4. "Dancing in the Moonlight"
5. "What is Love"
6. "Ain't That Just the Way"
7. "Burnin'"
8. "Gangsta's Paradise"
9. "Anywhere is Paradise"
10. "Lemon Tree"
11. "Not Forever"
12. "This Year's Love"
13. "There's a Place for Us" (bonus track)

== Personnel ==
E.M.D.

- Erik Segerstedt - vocals, piano, acoustic guitar
- Mattias Andréasson - vocals, bass guitar
- Danny Saucedo - vocals, acoustic guitar

== Chart positions ==
=== Rewind ===
"Rewind" debuted at #20 on December 10, 2010 on the Swedish Album Chart for its first week on the chart, becoming E.M.D.'s second weakest chart entry for a full album after Välkommen hem. Välkommen hem was sold exclusively at ICA retail stores, making it ineligible to chart. This making "Rewind" E.M.D.'s weakest chart entry for a full album being sold worldwide.

| Chart (2010) | Peak position |
|---|---|
| Sweden (Sverigetopplistan) | 20 |

=== "Save Tonight" ===
The lead single "Save Tonight" debuted at #5 on the Swedish singles chart, becoming E.M.D.'s sixth top 5 single. The next week it made a big fall to #39 and continued its decline on the chart the following weeks. However, it later re-entered the chart at a new peak position of #3.

| Chart (2010) | Peak position |
|---|---|
| Sweden (Sverigetopplistan) | 3 |
