= If Only You =

Single by Danny featuring Therese

from the album Heart Beats
- Released: August 8, 2007
- Genre: Pop, Dance
- Length: 3:28
- Label: SME
- Songwriters: Michel Zitron, Sophia Somajo, Vincent Pontare

Danny featuring Therese singles chronology
"Play It for the Girls" (2007)	"If Only You" (2007)	"Hey (I've Been Feeling Kind of Lonely)" (2007)

"If Only You" is the third single from the album Heart Beats by Danny Saucedo. It features Therese on the radio version which was released in early August.

On 8 August 2007, Danny & Therese sang "If Only You" at Sommarkrysset 2007 that was aired on TV4.

The single peaked at number three on the Swedish Singles Chart.

== 2011 re-release ==
The song was released in the UK during mid-2011, with Freja replacing Therese. A music video was shot for its release (music video on YouTube).

== Track listings ==
1. "If Only You" (radio version featuring Therese)
2. "If Only You" (original version)
3. "If Only You" (extended version featuring Therese)

== Charts ==
=== Weekly charts ===
2007–2008 Weekly chart performance for "If Only You"
Chart (2007–2008)	Peak position
CIS Airplay (TopHit)	2
Finland (Suomen virallinen lista)	9
Poland (Polish Airplay Chart)	2
Russia Airplay (TopHit)	1
Slovakia Airplay (ČNS IFPI)	2
Sweden (Sverigetopplistan)	3
Ukraine Airplay (TopHit)	2

2009 Weekly chart performance for "If Only You"
Chart (2009)	Peak position
CIS Airplay (TopHit)	48
Russia Airplay (TopHit)	43
Ukraine Airplay (TopHit)	127

2010 Weekly chart performance for "If Only You"
Chart (2010)	Peak position
CIS Airplay (TopHit)	102
Russia Airplay (TopHit)	94
Ukraine Airplay (TopHit)	137

2011 Weekly chart performance for "If Only You"
Chart (2011)	Peak position
CIS Airplay (TopHit)	166
Russia Airplay (TopHit)	170
Ukraine Airplay (TopHit)	118

2012 Weekly chart performance for "If Only You"
Chart (2012)	Peak position
Ukraine Airplay (TopHit)	185

2013 Weekly chart performance for "If Only You"
Chart (2013)	Peak position
Ukraine Airplay (TopHit)	181

2014 Weekly chart performance for "If Only You"
Chart (2014)	Peak position
Ukraine Airplay (TopHit)	32

2015 Weekly chart performance for "If Only You"
Chart (2015)	Peak position
Ukraine Airplay (TopHit)	82

2023 Weekly chart performance for "If Only You"
Chart (2023)	Peak position
Poland (Polish Airplay Top 100)	43

2024 Weekly chart performance for "If Only You"
Chart (2024)	Peak position
Moldova Airplay (TopHit)	54

2026 Weekly chart performance for "If Only You"
Chart (2026)	Peak position
Poland (Polish Airplay Top 100)	41

=== Monthly charts ===
2008 Monthly chart performance for "If Only You"
Chart (2008)	Peak position
CIS Airplay (TopHit)	1
Russia Airplay (TopHit)	1
Ukraine Airplay (TopHit)	8

2009 Monthly chart performance for "If Only You"
Chart (2009)	Peak position
CIS Airplay (TopHit)	70
Russia Airplay (TopHit)	68

2014 Monthly chart performance for "If Only You"
Chart (2014)	Peak position
Ukraine Airplay (TopHit)	43

=== Year-end charts ===
2008 year-end chart performance for "If Only You"
Chart (2008)	Position
CIS Airplay (TopHit)	3
Russia Airplay (TopHit)	4
Ukraine Airplay (TopHit)	16

2011 year-end chart performance for "If Only You"
Chart (2011)	Position
Ukraine Airplay (TopHit)	194

=== Decade-end charts ===
00s Decade-end chart performance for "Relax, Take It Easy"
Chart (2000–2009)	Position
CIS Airplay (TopHit)	16
Russia Airplay (TopHit)	15
Ukraine Airplay (TopHit)	84
