= Pulse (UK band) =

- Origin: London, England
- Genre: Dance pop
- Instruments: singing, dancing
- Years active: 2007
- Label: Gut Records
- Members: Claire Mealor; Marie McGonigle; Marquelle Ward; Phoenix; Rana Roy

Pulse were the winners of the BBC reality show, Dance X. Readers of The Sun newspaper chose the band's name. They signed a recording contract with Gut Records, and released their first single, "Dancing in Repeat", (written by Oscar Görres and Swedish popstar Danny Saucedo) as a digital download in August 2007, and as a CD single the following month. It debuted in the UK Singles Chart on 15 September 2007 at #91.

During 2007 they supported Rihanna in the UK leg of her tour.

Claire Mealor, Marie McGonigle, Marquelle Ward, Phoenix and Rana Roy started recording an album, but none was released. Ward and Roy starred in a series of an ITV drama, Britannia High.

== Discography ==
=== Singles ===
- "Dancing in Repeat" #91 UK
