= In the Club (song) =

Single by Danny Saucedo

from the album in the club
- Released: 4 March 2011
- Recorded: 2011
- Genre: Europop
- Label: Artisthuset/Sony Music
- Songwriter(s): Figge Boström; Peter Boström; Danny Saucedo

Danny Saucedo singles chronology
"In Your Eyes" (2010)	"In the Club" (2011)	"Tonight" (2011)

Music video
- "In the Club" (Live at Melodifestivalen) on YouTube

"In the Club" is an English language song by Swedish singer Danny Saucedo. The song is written by Figge Boström, Peter Boström and Saucedo himself. Saucedo participated in Melodifestivalen 2011, singing the song, in a bid to represent Sweden in the Eurovision Song Contest 2011 in Düsseldorf, Germany.

After finishing first in the first of four semi-finals that was held on 5 February 2011 in Coop Norrbotten Arena, Luleå, he qualified for the Melodifestivalen finals as one of ten songs chosen. The final was held on 12 March 2011 at the Ericsson Globe Arena in Stockholm and Saucedo came only second in votes to the winning song "Popular" by Eric Saade. Danny garnered 149 points to Saade's 193 points.

The single was released one week before the Melodifestivalen 2011 final and went in straight to number two on the Sverigetopplistan, the official Swedish Singles Chart on the chart dated 11 March 2011.

During a pause at Melodifestivalen 2013, the song was performed by Ann-Louise Hanson, Towa Carson and Siw Malmkvist as Bingohall. It was also released on an EP the same year.

== Charts ==
=== Weekly charts ===
Chart (2011)	Peak position
Sweden (Sverigetopplistan)	2
Turkey (Turkish Singles Chart)	41

=== Year-end charts ===
Chart (2011)	Position
Sweden (Sverigetopplistan)	67
