= Play It for the Girls =

Single by Danny

from the album Heart Beats
- Released: May 31, 2007
- Recorded: 2007
- Genre: Europop
- Length: 3:30
- Label: SME
- Songwriters: Jonas von der Burg; Anoo Bhagavan

Danny singles chronology
"Tokyo" (2007)	"Play It for the Girls" (2007)	"If Only You" (2007)

"Play It for the Girls" is an English language song by Danny Saucedo, better known as Danny, from his album Heart Beats. The song was written by Jonas von der Burg and Anoo Bhagavan.

It entered the Swedish Singles Chart on 31 May 2007 and reached number one on the chart on 7 June 2007, one week after its release. It stayed 17 weeks in total on the chart.

== Chart performance ==
=== Charts ===
Chart (2007)	Peak position
Swedish Singles Chart	1
