= Heart Beats (Danny album) =

Studio album by Danny
- Released: 30 May 2007
- Recorded: 2007
- Genre: Europop
- Label: SME

Danny chronology
Heart Beats (2007)	Set Your Body Free (2008)

Singles from Heart Beats
- 1. "Tokyo"; 2. "Play It for the Girls"; 3. "If Only You"

Professional ratings
Review scores
Source	Rating
AllMusic	4/5 stars

Heart Beats is the debut studio album by Danny Saucedo, released in 2007 following his participation in Idol 2006. The album debuted and peaked at number one on the Swedish Albums Chart. Three singles were released from the album, all of which peaked within the top 3.

== Track listing ==
No.	Title	Lyrics	Music	Length
1.	"I'll Be Over You"	David Westerlund, Mack	David Westerlund, Mack	3:46
2.	"Tokyo"	Jonas von der Burg, Anoo Bhagavan	Jonas von der Burg, Anoo Bhagavan	3:14
3.	"Hey (I've Been Feeling Kind of Lonely)"	Danny Saucedo, Oscar Görres	Danny Saucedo, Oscar Görres	3:06
4.	"Only Wanna Be With You"	Andreas Carlsson, Harry Sommerdahl	Andreas Carlsson, Harry Sommerdahl	3:54
5.	"Play It for the Girls"	Jonas von der Burg, Anoo Bhagavan	Jonas von der Burg, Anoo Bhagavan	3:30
6.	"Blue"	Danny Saucedo, Oscar Görres	Danny Saucedo, Oscar Görres	3:12
7.	"Purest Delight"	Jonas von der Burg, Anoo Bhagavan	Jonas von der Burg, Anoo Bhagavan	3:02
8.	"If Only You"	Michel Zitron, Vincent Pontare	Michel Zitron, Vincent Pontare	3:28
9.	"Do or Die"	Provider, Danny Saucedo, Kay J, Charlie Mason	Provider, Danny Saucedo, Kay J, Charlie Mason	3:43
10.	"Together Some Day"	Niclas Molinder, Joacim Persson, Pelle Ankarberg, Andreas Mattsson	Niclas Molinder, Joacim Persson, Pelle Ankarberg, Andreas Mattsson	3:25
11.	"Stay"	Simon Petrén, Joel Andersson, Terese Fredenwall	Simon Petrén, Joel Andersson, Terese Fredenwall	3:26
12.	"Tokyo (Spanish version)"	Patty Saucedo	Jonas von der Burg, Anoo Bhagavan	3:15
13.	"Here I Am" (Hidden track)			4:25
Total length:				48 min

== Charts ==
=== Weekly charts ===
Chart (2007)	Peak position
Sweden (Sverigetopplistan)	1

=== Year-end charts ===
Chart (2007)	Position
Sweden (Sverigetopplistan)	83
