= Baby Goodbye (E.M.D. song) =

Single by E.M.D.

from the album A State of Mind - Deluxe Edition
- Released: February 27, 2009 (Digital); March 2, 2009 (Physical)
- Recorded: 2009
- Genre: Europop
- Length: 2:54
- Label: BMG
- Songwriter(s): Mattias Andréasson, Oscar Görres, Danny Saucedo, Erik Segerstedt

E.M.D. singles chronology
"Alone" (2008)	"Baby Goodbye" (2009)	"Youngblood" (2009)

"Baby Goodbye" is the fourth single released by Swedish boy band E.M.D., who entered Melodifestivalen 2009 with the song and won a place in the finals. It became the group's fourth consecutive #1 single, debuting at #3 on the official Swedish Singles Chart, and reaching the top spot the week after, spending 3 weeks at number one.

== Track listing ==
1. "Baby Goodbye (Album Version)" - 2:56
2. "Baby Goodbye (Extended Version)" - 3:47
3. "Baby Goodbye (Instrumental)" - 2:56

== Charts ==
Chart (2009)	Peak position
Sweden (Sverigetopplistan)	1
