= Radio (Danny Saucedo song) =

Single by Danny Saucedo

from the album Set Your Body Free
- Released: November 2008
- Recorded: 2008
- Genre: Europop
- Length: 3:00
- Label: SME
- Songwriter(s): Michel Zirton, Tobias Gustavsson, Danny Saucedo

Danny Saucedo singles chronology
"Hey (I've Been Feeling Kind of Lonely)" (2007)	"Radio" (2008)	"Need to Know" (2008)

"Radio" is an English language song by Danny Saucedo and the first single from his studio album Set Your Body Free. The song was released in 2008 and was written by Michel Zirton, Tobias Gustavsson and Saucedo himself.

The song entered the Swedish Singles Chart on 13 November 2008, reaching number one on 4 December 2008 and staying at that position for an additional week. The song spent a total of 11 weeks on the chart.

== Charts ==
=== Weekly charts ===
Chart (2008–2009)	Peak position
CIS Airplay (TopHit)	20
Sweden (Sverigetopplistan)	1
Russia Airplay (TopHit)	35

=== Year-end charts ===
Chart (2008)	Position
Sweden (Sverigetopplistan)	80
Chart (2009)	Position
CIS (Tophit)	140
Russia Airplay (TopHit)	165
