= E.M.D. =

Swedish boyband

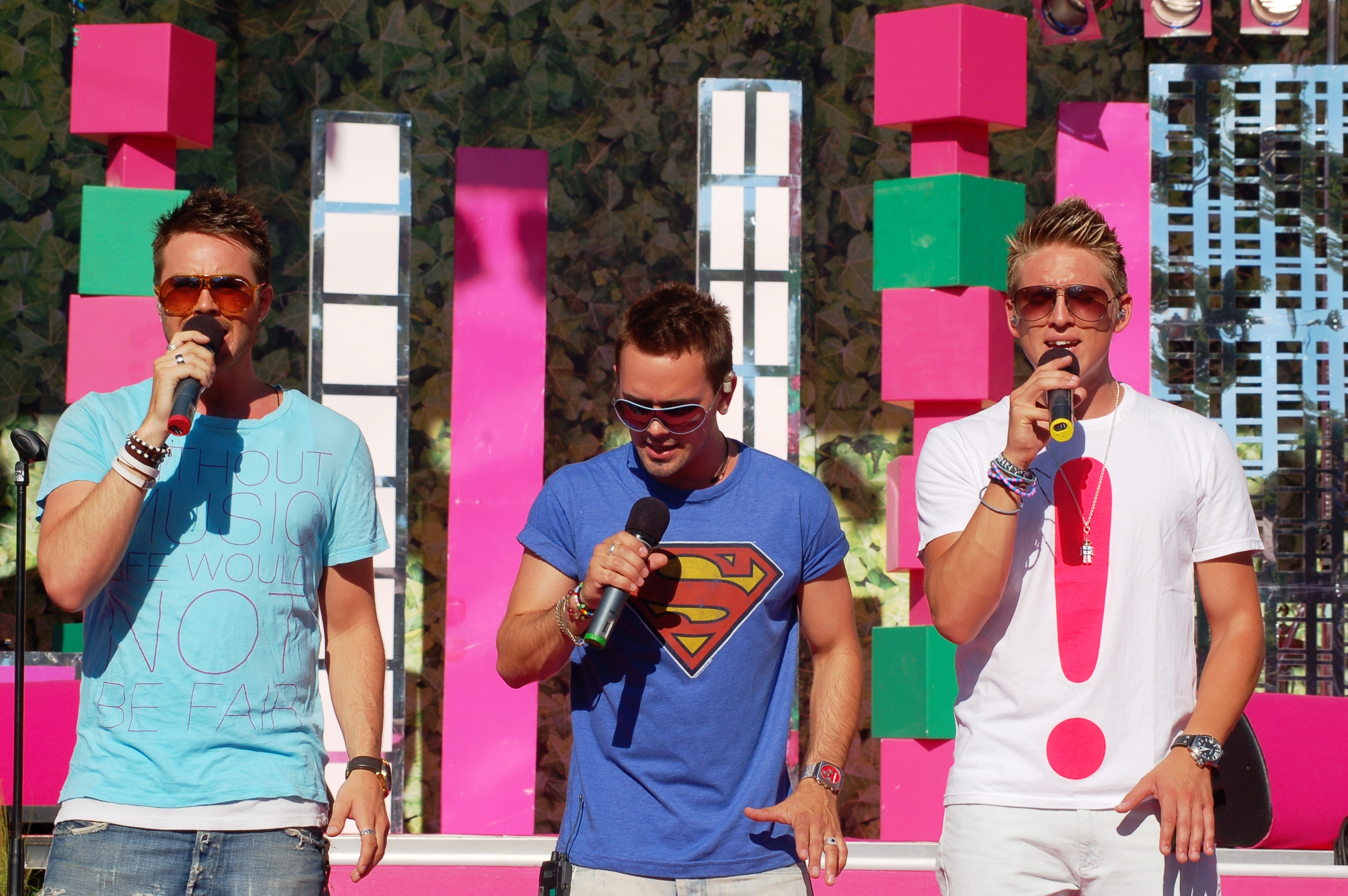
- E.M.D. performing in 2008

Background information
- Origin: Stockholm, Sweden
- Genres: Teen pop Pop
- Years active: 2007–2010; 2019; 2026
- Labels: Sony BMG; Ariola
- Past members: Erik Segerstedt; Mattias Andréasson; Danny Saucedo
- Website: emdartist.se/emd

E.M.D. is a Swedish boyband consisting of Erik Segerstedt, Mattias Andréasson and Danny Saucedo. All three members had participated on the Swedish version of Idol, with Erik as a finalist and Danny at 6th place on Idol 2006. Mattias was eliminated as the fourth runner-up on Idol 2007.

After Idol, the three formed E.M.D. releasing three albums and had a number of singles, including four consecutive #1s in 2007–2009 for "All for Love", "A State of Mind", "Jennie Let Me Love You" and "Baby Goodbye". In January 2009, the band won a Swedish Grammy for Song of The Year with "Jennie Let Me Love You".

In late 2010, the band announced an indefinite hiatus and broke up. The three members reunited in 2019 with a cover of the song "Hon är min", a song by GES.

== Beginnings ==
Erik Segerstedt (born 20 April 1983 in Uddevalla) was the runner-up on the third season of Swedish version of Idol 2006. Soon after, he got signed at Sony BMG and on 21 February 2007 his debut album A Different Shade was released. The album debuted at No. 2 on the Swedish albums chart and stayed at this position for a second week. The first single "I Can't say I'm Sorry", written by Andreas Carlsson, peaked at No. 1 on the Swedish singles chart.

Mattias Andréasson born on 29 March 1981, Swedish singer and contestant for Swedish Idol 2007 He came 5th place. After Idol, his version of Elton John's Your Song was released as a single and reached 48th place on Hitlistan.

Danny Saucedo (born Daniel Gabriel Alessandro Saucedo Grzechowski on 25 February 1986 in Stockholm, Stockholms Län, Sweden) is a Swedish singer, often presented just as Danny, who competed as one of the finalists in Idol 2006 – the Swedish version of Idol where he got to the top 6 before being eliminated. His mother is from Bolivia and his father is from Poland. In 2006, he released his first single, a cover of "Öppna din dörr" by Tommy Nilsson which charted at No. 24 on the Swedish singles chart. Danny is also a songwriter, composing songs for Alcazar and Pulse.

== Career ==
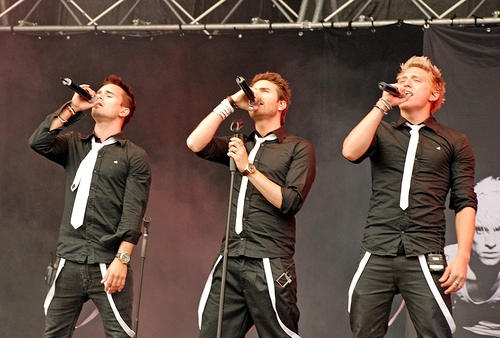
E.M.D. 2008

After both Erik Segerstedt and Danny Saucedo had released successful solo albums, the first with his A Different Shade and the second with his album Heart Beats, during the Autumn of 2007, they formed alongside Mattias Andréasson the Swedish trio E.M.D.. Their first single, a cover of Bryan Adams, Rod Stewart and Sting's hit "All For Love", rose to 3rd place on Hitlistan on 20 December that year. "All for Love" charted on Swedish national record chart immediately.

Based on the success of "All for Love", E.M.D. released their debut album, A State of Mind, in May 2008. The album debuted at No. 1 on the Swedish Album Chart and produced three additional domestic chart topping singles after "All for Love", being "Jennie Let Me Love You", "Alone" and, after the deluxe album edition, the single Baby Goodbye.

E.M.D had participated in the 2009 Melodifestivalen with the track "Baby Goodbye". being one of the four wildcards and having performed during the third semi-final in Leksand, on 21 February 2009. E.M.D. made it to the final, where they finished third.

Due to the success of "Baby Goodbye", the album was re-released as a deluxe edition with "Baby Goodbye" and the two new additional songs "Youngblood" (later released as a digital download single) and "I'm No Romeo".

On 9 November 2009 E.M.D. released their second album and first holiday album Välkommen hem, containing Swedish Christmas music and the album's first and only single Välkommen Hem originally sung by Magnus Carlsson) was released on 13 November 2009. The album was sold exclusively at ICA retail stores. The Christmas single charted at third place on Sverigetopplistan.

E.M.D. finished the studio recording of their second studio album and third album overall entitled Rewind in 2010. The band released the first single from the album, "Save Tonight" a cover of a song by Eagle-Eye Cherry), digitally on 28 May 2010. It charted on Sverigetopplistan at fifth place. The single was physically released on 16 June 2010. The album was released on 3 December 2010. The second single from the album "What Is Love", a cover of a song by Haddaway was released digitally on 19 October 2010. The album was released on 3 December 2010 with the release of the "There's a Place for Us" third single and second music video for the album on 5 December 2010, after the music video was released on 26 November.

In late 2010, the band announced an indefinite breakup.

The band had a one-off reunion during Melodifestivalen 2026, in which they performed their 2009 entry "Baby Goodbye" and served as backup dancers during the performance of Finnish music group KAJ's winning entry of the previous edition, "Bara bada bastu".

== In popular culture ==
"There's a Place for Us" is a bonus track on E.M.D.'s album Rewind and was featured as the main theme song in the Swedish version of both the motion picture and soundtrack for The Chronicles of Narnia: The Voyage of the Dawn Treader. The original version of the song which is otherwise featured in the motion picture and soundtrack was performed by Carrie Underwood.

== Awards ==
In January 2009, the band won a Swedish Grammy for Song of the Year with "Jennie Let Me Love You".

== Discography ==
Studio albums

- A State of Mind (2008)
  - A State of Mind (Deluxe Edition) (2009)
- Välkommen hem (2009)
- Rewind (2010)
