= Tokyo (Danny Saucedo song) =

Song by Danny Saucedo

Single by Danny

from the album Heart Beats
- Released: February 2007
- Genre: Pop, Dance
- Length: 3:14
- Label: SME
- Songwriters: Jonas von der Burg; Anoo Bhagavan; Niclas von der Burg
- Producer: Jonas von der Burg

Danny singles chronology
"Öppna din dörr" (2006)	"Tokyo" (2007)	"Play It for the Girls" (2007)

"Tokyo" is a 2007 single released by Swedish artist Danny Saucedo, better known as Danny. In 2008, Danny participated with the song in Polish Sopot International Song Festival.

== Chart performance ==
The song entered and peaked at number 4 on the Swedish Trackslistan on 24 February 2007 and charted for six weeks. The song also peaked at number one on the Swedish singles chart on 22 February 2007.

=== Weekly charts ===
Chart (2007–08)	Peak position
CIS Airplay (TopHit)	36
Finland (Suomen virallinen lista)	9
Poland (Airplay Chart)	2
Russia Airplay (TopHit)	40
Sweden (Sverigetopplistan)	1

=== Year-end charts ===
Chart (2008)	Position
CIS (TopHit)	191
Russia Airplay (TopHit)	155
Chart (2009)	Position
CIS (TopHit)	144
Russia Airplay (TopHit)	138
