= Välkommen hem (song) =

Single by Magnus Carlsson

from the album Spår i snön
- Released: 2006
- Recorded: 2006
- Genre: Holiday
- Songwriter(s): Mårten Sandén, Johan Röhr

"Välkommen hem" ("Welcome Home") is a holiday single by Magnus Carlsson appearing in his 2006 album Spår i snön. The song is written by Mårten Sandén and Johan Röhr.

== E.M.D. version ==
"Välkommen hem"

Single by E.M.D.

from the album Välkommen hem
- Released: November 13, 2009
- Recorded: 2009
- Genre: Holiday
- Length: 3:08
- Label: BMG
- Songwriter(s): Mårten Sandén, Johan Röhr

E.M.D. singles chronology
| "Youngblood" (2009) | "Välkommen hem" (2009) | "Save Tonight" (2010) |

Swedish vocal group E.M.D., re-released it as their first single from their Christmas album of the same name.

E.M.D.'s version was released as a charity single to raise money for Stadsmissionen, in support of helping the homeless.

=== Track listing ===
1. "Välkommen hem" (Radio edit) - 3:08

=== Chart positions ===
| Chart (2009) | Peak position |
|---|---|
| Sweden (Sverigetopplistan) | 3 |
