= Youngblood (E.M.D. song) =

Single by E.M.D.

from the album A State of Mind - Deluxe Edition
- Released: May 18, 2009
- Recorded: 2009
- Genre: Pop
- Length: 3:37
- Label: BMG

E.M.D. singles chronology
"Baby Goodbye" (2009)	"Youngblood" (2009)	"Välkommen hem" (2009)

"Youngblood" is the fifth and final single released from Swedish boy band E.M.D.'s debut studio album A State of Mind. The song was released as a digital download only.

== Chart positions ==
"Youngblood" was the first of E.M.D.'s singles not to reach the top position of the Swedish singles chart. The song debuted and peaked at #22 and only charted for four weeks, thus becoming the group's least successful release to date.

== Music video ==
The music video was released on October 22, 2009 via YouTube. The music video was shot in Las Vegas.

Chart (2009)	Peak position
Swedish Singles Chart	22
