= All for Love (song) =

1993 single by Bryan Adams, Rod Stewart, and Sting

Single by Bryan Adams, Rod Stewart, and Sting

from the album The Three Musketeers: Original Motion Picture Soundtrack
- Released: November 16, 1993
- Length: 4:45
- Label: A&M; Hollywood
- Songwriters: Bryan Adams; Robert "Mutt" Lange; Michael Kamen
- Producers: Chris Thomas; David Nicholas; Bryan Adams

Bryan Adams singles chronology
"Please Forgive Me" (1993)	"All for Love" (1993)	"Have You Ever Really Loved a Woman?" (1995)

Music video
- "All for Love" on YouTube

Rod Stewart singles chronology
"People Get Ready" (1993)	"All for Love" (1993)	"Having a Party" (1993)

Sting singles chronology
"Demolition Man" (1993)	"All for Love" (1993)	"Nothing 'Bout Me" (1994)

"All for Love" is a song written by Bryan Adams, Robert John "Mutt" Lange, and Michael Kamen for the soundtrack The Three Musketeers: Original Motion Picture Soundtrack. It is performed by Adams, Rod Stewart, and Sting. The power ballad was released as a CD single in the United States on November 16, 1993, by A&M and Hollywood Records. It was a worldwide hit, reaching number one across Europe, Australia, and North America.

Adams also did a live version in 1994 featuring Luciano Pavarotti, Andrea Bocelli, Nancy Gustafson, and Giorgia Todrani. Michael Kamen, who co-wrote the song with Adams and Lange, conducted the orchestra. In 2007, the Swedish band E.M.D. released a cover of the song, peaking at number one in their native country. Adams would also record a French-language remake with Garou and Roch Voisine, entitled "Tous ensemble", for the Quebecois film Il était une fois Les Boys.

== Background and writing ==
The title was inspired by The Three Musketeers' motto: "All for one, and one for all".

== Critical reception ==
Alan Jones from Music Week gave "All for Love" a top score of five out of five, writing, "With the minimum of formalities Bryan, Rod and Sting launch into their three-way rendition of this powerful ballad from the movie The Three Musketeers. Their vocals blend well, and though the song itself is a trifle predictable, their combined fan base should be strong enough to send this hurtling into the Top Five in next to no time." Pan-European magazine Music & Media commented, "Adams is always there when there's a film about history's great swashbucklers. For this power ballad he's accompanied by two champion knights, but we all know the "real" three musketeers were a foursome. Who'll join them? Robert Plant?" Mark Frith from Smash Hits gave the song four out of five, stating that it has "drama and powerful choruses on top. And it's got one of those searing guitar solos in the middle. [...] Genius! Love or hate it, you can't deny the professionalism that will probably make this number 1."

== Chart performance ==
In the United States, the single reached number one on the Billboard Hot 100 on January 22, 1994. It remained atop the charts for three weeks before it was knocked out of the top spot by "The Power of Love" by Celine Dion. It sold 1.2 million copies domestically and earned a platinum certification from the RIAA. In Canada, the song reached number one on the RPM Singles chart on January 17, 1994, replacing Adams's solo hit "Please Forgive Me", which had been number one for six weeks. With "All for Love" remaining at number one for five weeks, Adams was in the number one position for 11 straight weeks on the Canadian chart. In the United Kingdom, it reached number two on the UK singles chart.

== Track listings ==
- CD single: A&M Records / 580 477-2 Europe
1. "All for Love" (by Bryan Adams, Rod Stewart and Sting) – 4:48
2. "Straight from the Heart" (live; by Bryan Adams) – 3:34
3. "If Only" (by Rod Stewart) – 4:59
4. "Love Is Stronger Than Justice (The Munificent Seven)" (live; by Sting) – 4:02 1
- CD single: A&M Records / 580 476-2 Europe
1. "All for Love" (LP version) – 4:36
2. "All for Love" (instrumental) – 4:36 2

== Personnel ==
- Bryan Adams – lead vocals, guitar
- Rod Stewart – lead vocals
- Sting – lead vocals, bass
- Dominic Miller – guitar
- Keith Scott – lead guitar
- Bill Payne – piano
- Ed Shearmur – keyboards
- Mickey Curry – drums

== Charts ==
=== Weekly charts ===
Chart (1993–1994)	Peak position
Australia (ARIA)	1
Austria (Ö3 Austria Top 40)	1
Belgium (Ultratop 50 Flanders)	2
Canada Retail Singles (The Record)	6
Canada Top Singles (RPM)	1
Canada Adult Contemporary (RPM)	1
Denmark (IFPI)	1
Europe (Eurochart Hot 100)	1
Europe (European AC Radio)	1
Europe (European Hit Radio)	1
Finland (Suomen virallinen lista)	1
France (SNEP)	7
Germany (GfK)	1
Iceland (Íslenski Listinn Topp 40)	5
Ireland (IRMA)	1
Israel (Israeli Singles Chart)	14
Italy (Musica e dischi)	1
Netherlands (Dutch Top 40)	3
Netherlands (Single Top 100)	3
New Zealand (Recorded Music NZ)	5
Norway (VG-lista)	1
Scottish Singles Sales (Official Charts)	12
Spain (AFYVE)	17
Sweden (Sverigetopplistan)	1
Switzerland (Schweizer Hitparade)	1
UK Singles (Official Charts)	2
UK Airplay (Music Week)	4
US Billboard Hot 100	1
US Adult Contemporary (Billboard)	4
US Pop Airplay (Billboard)	1
US Cash Box Top 100	1
Zimbabwe (ZIMA)	1

=== Year-end charts ===
Chart (1994)	Position
Australia (ARIA)	10
Austria (Ö3 Austria Top 40)	3
Belgium (Ultratop)	18
Brazil (Mais Tocadas)	16
Canada Top Singles (RPM)	1
Canada Adult Contemporary (RPM)	11
Europe (Eurochart Hot 100)	4
Europe (European Hit Radio)	6
Germany (Media Control)	9
Iceland (Íslenski Listinn Topp 40)	21
Italy (Musica e dischi)	9
Netherlands (Dutch Top 40)	22
Netherlands (Single Top 100)	29
New Zealand (RIANZ)	42
Sweden (Topplistan)	2
Switzerland (Schweizer Hitparade)	7
UK Singles (OCC)	37
UK Airplay (Music Week)	27
US Billboard Hot 100	8
US Adult Contemporary (Billboard)	17
US Cash Box Top 100	22

=== Decade-end charts ===
Chart (1990–1999)	Position
US Billboard Hot 100	69

== Certifications ==
Region	Certification	Certified units/sales
Australia (ARIA)	Platinum	70,000^{^}
Austria (IFPI Austria)	Gold	25,000^{*}
Germany (BVMI)	Gold	250,000^{^}
Japan (RIAJ)	Gold	50,000^{^}
New Zealand (RMNZ)	Gold	15,000^{‡}
Sweden (GLF)	Gold	25,000^{^}
United Kingdom (BPI)	Silver	200,000^{^}
United States (RIAA)	Platinum	1,200,000
^{*} Sales figures based on certification alone.^{^} Shipments figures based on certification alone.^{‡} Sales+streaming figures based on certification alone.

== E.M.D. version ==
"All for Love"

Single by E.M.D.

from the album A State of Mind
- Released: December 17, 2007
- Length: 3:10
- Label: Ariola
- Songwriters: Bryan Adams; Robert "Mutt" Lange; Michael Kamen

E.M.D. singles chronology
"All for Love" (2007)	"Jennie Let Me Love You" (2008)

Music video
- "All for Love" on YouTube

On December 17, 2007, Swedish musical trio E.M.D. released a cover of "All for Love" as their debut single. Debuting at number two on the official Swedish Singles Chart, it ascended to number one the week after and stayed there for six consecutive weeks. The single stayed on the chart for 17 weeks and was certified triple platinum in Sweden.

=== Charts ===
==== Weekly charts ====
Chart (2007–2008)	Peak position
Sweden (Sverigetopplistan)	1

==== Year-end charts ====
Chart (2007)	Position
Sweden (Sverigetopplistan)	5

Chart (2008)	Position
Sweden (Sverigetopplistan)	10
