= Save Tonight =

1997 single by Eagle-Eye Cherry

- Artwork for original continental European release

Single by Eagle-Eye Cherry

from the album Desireless
- B-side: "Conversation"
- Released: 7 October 1997
- Genre: Alternative rock
- Length: 3:55
- Label: Superstudio Blå
- Songwriter: Eagle-Eye Cherry
- Producer: Adam Kviman

Eagle-Eye Cherry singles chronology
"Save Tonight" (1997)	"When Mermaids Cry" (1998)

Music video
- "Save Tonight" on YouTube

"Save Tonight" is a song written and performed by Swedish rock musician Eagle-Eye Cherry, released on 7 October 1997 as the lead single from his debut album, Desireless (1997). It is the album's opening track and gained substantial radio success, reaching number three in Ireland, number five in the United States, number six in the United Kingdom, and number two in Cherry's native Sweden. "Save Tonight" was awarded the Rockbjörnen award in the "Swedish song of the year 1997" category.

== Critical reception ==
Larry Flick of Billboard magazine wrote, "With a voice mildly reminiscent of Seal, the lad gives 'Save Tonight' a richly soulful edge that cuts through the track's shiny arrangement of strumming acoustic guitars and prickly electric licks. Beyond the single's well-crafted surface are vivid, storyteller lyrics that are smarter than what you'll typically find on radio. An excellent, commercially sound way of introducing the artist's sterling full-length debut, Desireless, this cut demands immediate modern and mainstream rock radio play—and perhaps even triple-A and eventually top 40 stations." Scottish newspaper Daily Record felt that with the song, "late jazz legend Don's son and Neneh's brother is living up to his musical heritage."

== Music video ==
The monochrome music video was directed by Johan Camitz. It was filmed at Skånegatan 92-94 in Stockholm's Södermalm district from 9–10 September 1997, and features Cherry playing different characters and seeing the story from different perspectives. Cherry prepares for a date by buying roses and a bottle of wine at a deli; he waves goodbye to the butcher, who proves to be another Cherry. A robber wearing tights over his head as a disguise (purchased in a nearby shop at the start of the video) enters the deli and takes money from the cash register; when he runs out, he is hit by a pickup truck. Both he and the driver are additional duplicates of Cherry, and two others appear as a man playing guitar and a homeless person sleeping on the sidewalk. The Cherry who entered the deli walks past and tosses some change to the latter before departing for his date. The video is edited to make it appear as a single continuous take.

== Track listings ==
- Swedish and European CD single; UK cassette single
1. "Save Tonight" – 3:55
2. "Conversation" – 4:55
- UK CD single
1. "Save Tonight"
2. "Save Tonight" (Bacon & Quarmby remix)
3. "Conversation"
4. "Save Tonight" (video)
- Australasian CD single
1. "Save Tonight"
2. "Save Tonight" (Bacon & Quarmby remix)
3. "Conversation"

== Personnel ==
Personnel are lifted from the Desireless album booklet.

- Eagle-Eye Cherry – music, lyrics, vocals, background vocals, co-production
- Mattias Torell – acoustic guitar, electric guitar
- Klas Åhlund – electric guitar
- Elias Modig – bass
- Magnus Persson – drums
- Adam Kviman – production, mixing, engineering

== Charts ==
=== Weekly charts ===
1997–1999 weekly chart performance for "Save Tonight"
Chart (1997–1999)	Peak position
Australia (ARIA)	20
Austria (Ö3 Austria Top 40)	17
Belgium (Ultratop 50 Flanders)	9
Belgium (Ultratop 50 Wallonia)	27
Canada Top Singles (RPM)	9
Canada Adult Contemporary (RPM)	22
Canada Rock/Alternative (RPM)	6
Europe (Eurochart Hot 100)	8
Europe Border Breakers (Music & Media)	1
European Radio Top 50 (Music & Media)	5
France (SNEP)	11
France Airplay (Music & Media)	1
Germany (GfK)	18
Greece (IFPI)	7
Hungary (Mahasz)	7
Hungary Airplay (Music & Media)	3
Iceland (Íslenski Listinn Topp 40)	8
Ireland (IRMA)	3
Italy Airplay (Music & Media)	4
Mexico International (Notitas Musicales)	3
Netherlands (Dutch Top 40)	8
Netherlands (Single Top 100)	9
New Zealand (Recorded Music NZ)	35
Norway (VG-lista)	9
Poland Airplay (Music & Media)	17
Scottish Singles Sales (Official Charts)	4
Spain Airplay (Music & Media)	3
Sweden (Sverigetopplistan)	2
Switzerland (Schweizer Hitparade)	7
UK Singles (Official Charts)	6
UK Airplay (Music Week)	1
US Billboard Hot 100	5
US Adult Alternative Airplay (Billboard)	1
US Adult Pop Airplay (Billboard)	3
US Alternative Airplay (Billboard)	8
US Pop Airplay (Billboard)	1

2013–2026 weekly chart performance for "Save Tonight"
Chart (2013–2026)	Peak position
Finland Airplay (Radiosoittolista)	55
Norway Airplay (IFPI Norge)	37
Poland Airplay (ZPAV)	55
Slovenia Airplay (SloTop50)	25

=== Year-end charts ===
1997 year-end chart performance for "Save Tonight"
Chart (1997)	Position
Sweden (Topplistan)	8

1998 year-end chart performance for "Save Tonight"
Chart (1998)	Position
Belgium (Ultratop 50 Flanders)	69
Canada Top Singles (RPM)	90
Europe (Eurochart Hot 100)	40
Europe Airplay (Music & Media)	4
Europe Border Breakers (Music & Media)	1
France (SNEP)	51
Germany (Media Control)	56
Netherlands (Dutch Top 40)	58
Netherlands (Single Top 100)	72
Switzerland (Schweizer Hitparade)	40
UK Singles (OCC)	39
US Adult Top 40 (Billboard)	36
US Mainstream Top 40 (Billboard)	57
US Modern Rock Tracks (Billboard)	33
US Triple-A (Billboard)	7

1999 year-end chart performance for "Save Tonight"
Chart (1999)	Position
Canada Top Singles (RPM)	49
US Billboard Hot 100	22
US Adult Top 40 (Billboard)	5
US Mainstream Top 40 (Billboard)	11
US Modern Rock Tracks (Billboard)	91
US Triple-A (Billboard)	25

== Certifications ==
Certifications and sales for "Save Tonight"
Region	Certification	Certified units/sales
Australia (ARIA)	Gold	35,000^{^}
Denmark (IFPI Danmark)	Platinum	90,000^{‡}
Germany (BVMI)	Gold	250,000^{‡}
Italy (FIMI)	Gold	25,000^{‡}
New Zealand (RMNZ)	3× Platinum	90,000^{‡}
Spain (Promusicae)	Gold	30,000^{‡}
Sweden (GLF)	Platinum	30,000^{^}
United Kingdom (BPI)	2× Platinum	1,200,000^{‡}
^{^} Shipments figures based on certification alone.^{‡} Sales+streaming figures based on certification alone.

== Release history ==
Release dates and formats for "Save Tonight"
Region	Date	Format(s)	Label(s)	Ref.
Sweden	7 October 1997	CD	Superstudio Blå	
United Kingdom	15 June 1998	CD; cassette	Polydor	
United States	22 June 1998	Modern rock radio	Work	
United States	14 July 1998	Contemporary hit radio	Work	

== E.M.D. version ==
"Save Tonight"

Single by E.M.D.

from the album Rewind
- Released: 21 May 2010
- Genre: Pop
- Length: 3:35
- Label: BMG
- Songwriter: Eagle-Eye Cherry
- Producers: Henrik Edenhed; Tobias Gustavsson

E.M.D. singles chronology
"Välkommen hem" (2009)	"Save Tonight" (2010)	"What Is Love" (2010)

Audio
- "Save Tonight" on YouTube

In 2010, Swedish boy band E.M.D. released a cover version of "Save Tonight" as the first single from their second studio album, Rewind (2010). It was released digitally in 2010.

=== Charts ===
Weekly chart performance for "Save Tonight"
Chart (2010)	Peak position
Sweden (Sverigetopplistan)	3
