= Jennie Let Me Love You =

Single by E.M.D.

from the album A State of Mind
- Released: March 31, 2008 (Digital); April 2, 2008 (Physical)
- Recorded: 2008
- Genre: Pop
- Length: 3:10
- Label: Ariola
- Songwriter(s): Michel Zitron, Tobias Gustavsson

E.M.D. singles chronology
"All for Love" (2007)	"Jennie Let Me Love You" (2008)	"Alone" (2008)

"Jennie Let Me Love You" is the second single released by Swedish boy band E.M.D. Following the commercial success of their previous single, "Jennie Let Me Love You" debuted at number on the Swedish singles chart. The following week it climbed to the top spot, where it remained for six consecutive weeks, making it the longest running number one single in Sweden in 2008. It has since been certified Gold, in recognition of 10,000 copies of the single sold. The track was co-written and produced by Tobias Gustavsson who also co-wrote and produced Danny Saucedo's number one single "Radio", released in December 2008.

== Track listing ==
1. "Jennie Let Me Love You (Radio Edit)" - 3:08
2. "Jennie Let Me Love You (Album Version)" - 3:08

== Charts ==
=== Weekly charts ===
Chart (2008)	Peak position
Sweden (Sverigetopplistan)	1

=== Year-end charts ===
Chart (2008)	Position
Sweden (Sverigetopplistan)	8
