= Alone (E.M.D. song) =

Single by E.M.D.

from the album A State of Mind
- Released: May 2008
- Recorded: 2008
- Genre: Pop
- Length: 3:47
- Label: Ariola
- Songwriters: Andreas Romdhane, Josef Larossi, C. Kelly

E.M.D. singles chronology
"Jennie Let Me Love You" (2008)	"Alone" (2008)	"Baby Goodbye" (2009)

"Alone" is the third and final single released from Swedish boy band E.M.D.'s debut album A State of Mind. On its fourth week on the chart it reached the top position, becoming E.M.D.'s third consecutive number one-single in Sweden.

== Track listing ==
1. "Alone (Album Version)" - 3:47
2. "Alone (Instrumental)" - 3:47

== Charts ==
Chart (2008)	Peak position
Swedish Singles Chart	1
