= Välkommen hem =

Välkommen Hem

Studio album by E.M.D.
- Released: November 9, 2009
- Recorded: 2009
- Genre: Christmas music
- Label: Sony Music Entertainment Sweden

E.M.D. chronology
A State of Mind (2008)	Välkommen Hem (2009)	Rewind (2010)

Singles from Välkommen Hem
- 1. "Välkommen hem" Released: November 13, 2009

Välkommen hem is the second studio album released by Swedish boy band E.M.D. It marks their first release of material sung in Swedish. The album was released in Sweden on November 9, 2009 and features both classic and lesser known Christmas songs. The album was recorded in Stockholm, Sweden at Grünewaldsalen and was produced by Peter Nordahl. The first and only single to be released off the album was the title track "Välkommen hem".

== Track listing ==
1. "Jul, jul, strålande jul"
2. "Ave Maria"
3. "Välkommen hem"
4. "När det lider mot jul"
5. "O helga natt"
6. "Halleluja"
7. "Stilla natt"
8. "Ängel"
9. "Julvisa"(Giv mig ej glans, ej guld, ej prakt)
10. "Koppången"
11. "Härlig är jorden"

== Chart positions ==
The album was sold exclusively at ICA retail stores, bringing money to the World Childhood Foundation, and therefore the album was ineligible to chart upon first release. Despite not being eligible to chart, Välkommen hem sold over 160,000 copies, and was certified 4× Platinum. In 2019, the album charted for the first time, reaching number 13 on the Swedish Albums Chart.

Chart performance for Välkommen hem
Chart (2019–2022)	Peak position
Swedish Albums (Sverigetopplistan)	6
