= A State of Mind (album) =

Studio album by E.M.D.
- Released: 14 May 2008
- Recorded: 2007–2008
- Genre: Pop, pop rock
- Length: 41:13
- Label: Ariola

E.M.D. chronology
| A State of Mind (2008) | Välkommen hem (2009) |

Singles from A State of Mind
- 1. "All for Love" Released: December 17, 2007; 2. "Jennie Let Me Love You" Released: March 31, 2008; 3. "Alone" Released: August 2008; 4. "Baby Goodbye" Released: February 27, 2009; 5. "Youngblood" Released: May 18, 2009

Alternative cover
- Deluxe edition cover

A State of Mind is the first studio album by Swedish boy band E.M.D. The album was released on May 14, 2008, following the success of their first two singles "All for Love" and "Jennie Let Me Love You".

== Track listing ==
1. "All for Love" (RJ. Lange, Bryan Adams, M. Kamen)
2. "Run to You" (Johan Åberg, Robert Habolin)
3. "Jennie Let Me Love You" (Michel Zitron, Tobias Gustavsson)
4. "One Call Away" (Michel Zitron, R. Rudej, J. Wetterberg)
5. "We Can" (Mattias Wollo, Henrik Korpi, Tom Nichols)
6. "Alone" (Andreas Romdhane, Josef Larossi, C. Kelly)
7. "For You" (Jörgen Elofsson, Andreas Carlsson, Lisa Greene)
8. "I Lied" (Harry Sommerdahl, Hanne Sörvaag)
9. "Give Me Some Time" (Oscar Görres, Danny Saucedo)
10. "Look at You Now" (Sanden, Jonasson, Appelgren, Larsson)
11. "She's My California" (Jörgen Elofsson)
12. "You"

== Chart positions ==
The album debuted at #1 in the Swedish albums chart. There were five singles to be spawned from the album. In April 2009, the album was certified Platinum in Sweden by the IFPI in recognition of 40,000 copies sold.

| Chart (2008) | Peak position |
|---|---|
| Swedish Albums Chart | 1 |

== Deluxe edition ==
Following E.M.D.'s participation in Melodifestivalen 2009, A State of Mind was re-released to include their Melodifestivalen entry "Baby Goodbye", which eventually became the group's fourth consecutive #1 hit in Sweden. Also included on the release were new songs "Youngblood" (later released as a digital download single) and "I'm No Romeo".

=== Deluxe Edition track listing ===
1. "Baby Goodbye"
2. "Youngblood"
3. "I'm No Romeo"
4. "All for Love" (Radio edit)
5. "Run to You"
6. "Jennie Let Me Love You" (Radio edit)
7. "One Call Away"
8. "We Can"
9. "Alone"
10. "For You"
11. "I Lied"
12. "Give Me Some Time"
13. "Look at You Now"
14. "She's My California"
