= The Beginning =

The Beginning may refer to:

== Film ==
- The Beginning (film), a 1970 Soviet film

== Literature ==
- The Beginning, a 1967 novel by Patrick D. Smith
- The Beginning, a 2000 novel by Marilyn Kaye
- The Beginning (Animorphs), a 2001 novel by K. A. Applegate
- The Beginning, a 2012 novel by Karen Kingsbury

== Television ==
=== Episodes ===
- "The Beginning", Bonanza season 4, episode 9 (1962)
- "The Beginning", Calls episode 2 (2021)
- "The Beginning", Counterstrike season 1, episode 14 (1990)
- "The Beginning", DinoSquad season 1, episode 1 (2007)
- "The Beginning", Eureka Seven episode 13 (2005)
- "The Beginning", Fallout season 1, episode 8 (2024)
- "The Beginning", Fear the Walking Dead season 6, episode 16 (2021)
- "The Beginning...", Gotham season 5, episode 12 (2019)
- "The Beginning", Grace and Frankie season 7, episode 16 (2022)
- "The Beginning", James Bond Jr. episode 1 (1991)
- "The Beginning", Jem season 1, episode 1 (1985)
- "The Beginning", Lazer Tag Academy episode 1 (1986)
- "The Beginning", Mega Man season 1, episode 1 (1994)
- "The Beginning", Pandamonium episode 1 (1982)
- "The Beginning", Raised by Wolves season 1, episode 20 (2020)
- "The Beginning", Red Dwarf series 10, episode 6 (2012)
- "The Beginning", Samurai Jack season 1, episode 1 (2001)
- "The Beginning", The Ann Sothern Show season 3, episode 25 (1961)
- "The Beginning", The Champions episode 1 (1968)
- "The Beginning", The Empire episode 8 (2021)
- "The Beginning", The Guardian season 1, episode 22 (2002)
- "The Beginning", The Morose Mononokean season 1, episode 1 (2016)
- "The Beginning", The Victorian Kitchen Garden episode 1 (1987)
- "The Beginning", The Waltons season 9, episode 14 (1981)
- "The Beginning", The X-Files season 6, episode 1 (1998)
- "The Beginning", To Have & to Hold episode 1 (2021)
- "The Beginning", Witchblade episode 1 (2006)
- "The Beginning", Without a Trace season 5, season 5, episode 24 (2007)
- "The Beginning" (Young Americans), 2000

=== Series ===
- The Beginning (TV series), a Chinese TV drama series
- B – The Beginning, a Japanese animated web series

== Music ==
=== Albums ===
- The Beginning (Black Eyed Peas album), 2010
- The Beginning (Broiler album), 2013
- The Beginning (EP), by The Features, 2004
- The Beginning (Jandek album), 1999
- The Beginning (JYJ album), 2010
- The Beginning (Kevin Borg album), 2009
- The Beginning (Mercyful Fate album), 1987 compilation
- The Beginning (Miles Davis album), 1955
- The Beginning (Trae album), 2008
- The Beginning, by Brooklyn Bounce
- The Beginning, by Midnight Star, 1980

=== Songs ===
- "The Beginning" (One Ok Rock song), 2012
- "The Beginning" (Seal song), 1991
- "The Beginning", by Alicia Keys from Here, 2016
- "The Beginning", by Aṣa from Lucid, 2019
- "The Beginning", by As I Lay Dying from Frail Words Collapse, 2003
- "The Beginning", by Billy Ray Cyrus from Home at Last, 2007
- "The Beginning", by Blue Stahli from The Devil, 2013
- "The Beginning", by In This Moment from Mother, 2020
- "The Beginning", by Little Mix from Get Weird, 2015
- "The Beginning", by Madison Beer from Life Support, 2021
- "The Beginning", by Magdalena Bay from Mercurial World, 2021
- "The Beginning", by RuPaul from Glamazon, 2011

== Other ==
- The Beginning (tour), by The Black Eyed Peas
- The Beginning: Making 'Episode I', a 2001 documentary about Star Wars: Episode I – The Phantom Menace
- The Beginning, a Beanie Baby bear produced after the 1999 Beanie Baby retirement vote
- "The Beginning", an episode of The Legend of Neil
- "The Beginning", an episode of Ishq Aaj Kal

== See also ==
- Begin (disambiguation)
- Beginner (disambiguation)
- Beginning (disambiguation)
- Beginnings (disambiguation)
- New Beginning (disambiguation)
- In the Beginning (disambiguation)
