= Beginnings =

Beginnings may refer to:

== Literature ==
- Beginnings (collection), a 1988 collection of short stories and poems by Gordon R. Dickson
- Beginnings (Honorverse), a 2013 collection of short stories in the Worlds of Honor series
- Beginnings (novella), by Laurie R. King (2019)
- "The Beginnings", a 1917 poem by Rudyard Kipling

== Music ==
=== Albums ===
- Beginnings (The Allman Brothers Band album), 1973
- Beginnings (Ambrose Slade album), 1969
- Beginnings (Happy the Man album), 1990
- Beginnings (Memento album) or the title song, 2003
- Beginnings (Meredith Monk album), 2009
- Beginnings (Rick Springfield album), 1972
- Beginnings (Steve Howe album) or the title song, 1975
- Beginnings (Trevor Rabin album), 1977
- Beginnings: Greatest Hits & New Songs, by Cilla Black, 2003
- Beginnings: Nimmons'n'Braid, 2005
- Beginnings: The Best of the Early Years, by Clannad, 2008
- Beginnings: The Lost Tapes 1988–1991, by Tupac Shakur, 2007
- Beginnings, by Morris Albert, 1983

=== Songs ===
- "Beginnings" (Chicago song), 1969
- "Beginnings", by Jimi Hendrix from Midnight Lightning, 1975
- "Beginnings", by Mark Gormley, 2009

== Television episodes ==
- "Beginnings" (Fraggle Rock)
- "Beginnings" (The Legend of Korra)
- "Beginnings" (Power Rangers S.P.D.)
- "Beginnings" (Spaced)

== See also ==
- Begin (disambiguation)
- Beginner (disambiguation)
- Beginning (disambiguation)
- New Beginning (disambiguation)
- In the Beginning (disambiguation)
- The Beginning (disambiguation)
