= Fighting Man =

Fighting Man may also refer to:

- A Fighting Man, a 2014 Canadian film written and directed by Damian Lee
- The Fighting Man, an album by Forefather
- Fighting Man or Fighter (Dungeons & Dragons), One of the standard playable character classes in the Dungeons & Dragons
