= Curse of the Cwelled =

Studio album by Forefather
- Released: 2015
- Recorded: June 2014 – February 2015
- Genre: Viking metal, folk metal
- Length: 50:10
- Label: Seven Kingdoms
- Producer: Forefather

Forefather chronology
Last of the Line (2011)	Curse of the Cwelled (2015)

Curse of the Cwelled is the seventh studio album by the English folk metal band Forefather. It was officially released on April 23, 2015 in time for St George's Day by their own record label, Seven Kingdoms.

== Track listing ==
1. "Havoc on Holy Island" - 5.25
2. "The Anvil" - 3:50
3. "By My Lord I Will Lie" - 5:05
4. "Fire of Baited Blood" - 3:58
5. "Curse of the Cwelled" - 5:05
6. "Awakened Hate" - 4:53
7. "Painted with Blood" - 4:42
8. "Rustics to Remain" - 3:51
9. "Edge of Oblivion" - 4:03
10. "Master of Fate" - 5:07
11. "The River-Maid's Farewell" (Instrumental) - 4:11

== Lyrical references ==
As is typical for the band, much of the album's lyrics are based on the history of England. Several songs include elements quoting relevant poems or other works, often in Anglo Saxon.

- "Havoc on Holy Island" describes the 793 raid on the island of Lindisfarne, and includes a passage from the Anglo-Saxon Chronicle describing the incident.
- "The Anvil" is based on, and includes lyrics directly from, a Rudyard Kipling poem of the same name. While the original poem describes William the Conqueror as a unifying force "forging" England into a single nation, the song reverses this and portrays him as a tyrant reshaping England as he sees fit, at the expense of its people.
- "By My Lord I Will Lie" describes the Battle of Maldon, and quotes from the Old English poem about the event.
- "Awakened Hate" is closely based on the poem "The Beginnings".
- "Painted with Blood" is based on The Battle of the Teutoburg Forest.
- "Curse of the Cwelled" describes the Anglo-Saxon inhabitants of England chafing under William the Conqueror's rule. It includes lines from a 1066 entry in the Anglo-Saxon Chronicle.
- "Rustics to Remain" is about the Peasants' Revolt
- "Master of Fate" draws from J.R.R. Tolkien's legendarium. It is about the tale of Túrin Turambar; the title "Turambar" translates to "master of fate".
- "The River-Maid's Farewell" is an adaptation of the 17th century English Country Dance titled "Parson's Farewel".
