= Symbel (band) =

UK musical group

Symbel is an English heathen metal rock band, created in 2001 by Sceot Acwealde (also Bretwaldas of Heathen Doom and Herne), fusing lyrical elements of the English neopagan, anti-capitalist and esoteric anarchist circles with folkish and romanticist nationalist beliefs, drawing from the philosophies suggested in the Anglo-Saxon and Old Norse texts.

== Releases ==
The debut CD was released in January 2003 by Angelisc Enterprises, the label run by Forefather, now called Seven Kingdoms. Subsequent work has been released by King Penda Productions and Midhir Records.

- Heathen Drinking Metal; 27 minutes four track demos 2001 / 02
- We Drink - Hymns and Counsel of Anglo-Saxon Heathenry; CD 2003 36 minutes
- "Wet English Forests"; 10-inch vinyl 45 rpm 2004 – re-release of selected demo material.
- Ale Whores of Mercia; CD May 2007
- Gyddigg - Possessed by the Rage of Wod; CD 2013
- Hammerwych; EP August 2014

King Penda Productions has made available these releases as digital downloads at Bandcamp.

== Members ==
- Sceot Acwealde – vocals, all instruments.

== Interviews ==
- METAL COVEN – MAY 2004
- FROM BELOW – MAR 2004
- EXPLOSION CEREBRAL – OCT 2003
- METALIRELAND – JUNE 2003
- LORDSOFMETAL – MAR 2003
