= White Crow =

Studio album by La-Ventura
- Released: 2013
- Genre: Rock; Melodic metal
- Length: 39:59
- Label: Valkyrie Rising, Ravenheart Music
- Producer: Didier Chesneau

La-Ventura chronology
A New Beginning (2007)	White Crow (2013)

White Crow is the second studio album by the Dutch rock/melodic metal band La-Ventura.

== Reception ==
Ten tracks, heavier, more consistent, more mature… it was worth the wait for sure!…

— Rock Tribune Magazine 2013

…this band sounds awesome almost “un-Dutch”…

— Aardschok magazine 2013

…great heavy grooves, tight riffs and overall terrific catchy songs…

— LiveXS magazine 2013

…this band can make it big! 90/100

— ZwareMetalen

This band deserves a breakthrough, which gives the dying Female fronted Metal scene a real kick in the butt with White Crow! 4.5/5

— PodiumInfo 2013

== Track listing ==
No.	Title	Length
1.	"Falling Down"	03:51
2.	"Human Vanity"	03:51
3.	"Close to You"	03:38
4.	"Song for an Idiot"	04:12
5.	"White Crow"	03:56
6.	"Drowning"	05:01
7.	"Time and Time Again"	04:00
8.	"Neverending Story"	03:51
9.	"The Only One"	03:51
10.	"Watch Me Go"	04:03
Total length:		39:59

== Personnel ==
La-Ventura

- Mike Saffrie – bass
- Stefan Simons – drums
- Carla van Huizen – vocals
- Sascha Kondic – guitars

Guest/session musicians

- Jos Houtzager – additional keys

Miscellaneous staff

- Didier Chesneau – producer
- Iris Compiet – art direction
- Manon Koopman – photography
- Eddy de Putter – artwork
- Bruno Gruel – mastering

== Notes ==
- Recorded and mixed at MII Recording Studio, France, 2010–2012.
- Mastered by Elektra Mastering, France, 2012.
- Special edition 6 panel digipack, with 16-page booklet and 2 bonustracks.
- Videos were made for "Falling Down" and "Song for an Idiot".
