= Deep into Time =

Deep Into Time

Studio album by Forefather
- Released: 1999
- Recorded: 1998
- Genres: Black metal, pagan metal
- Length: 40:19 (original edition); 44:46 (2002 reissue); 51:25 (2004 reissue); 48:09 (2005 vinyl reissue)
- Labels: Angelisc; Karmageddon Media; Eisenwald Tonschmiede
- Producer: Forefather

Forefather chronology
Deep Into Time (1999)	The Fighting Man (2000)

Deep Into Time is the debut studio album by the English pagan metal band Forefather, released in 1999 on Angelisc Enterprises, the band's own record label. This album was later re-issued three times - in 2002 by Angelisc Enterprises with a bonus track "These Lands", in 2004 by Karmageddon Media with three bonus tracks including "These Lands" and in 2005 by Eisenwald Tonschmiede as an LP record (500 copies) including above-mentioned "These Lands" and one more song as bonus tracks.

Daniel of MetalReviews.com rated the album an 86 out of 100, adding that "this is face-melting anglo-saxon metal from beginning to end."

== Track listing ==
No.	Title	Length
1.	"Intro"	01:54
2.	"Natural Chaos"	03:23
3.	"Deep Into Time"	04:10
4.	"Immortal Wisdom"	04:45
5.	"Visions of Elders"	06:32
6.	"These Lands" (2002 reissue bonus track)	04:27
7.	"Dusk to Dawn"	05:59
8.	"Ancient Voice"	04:18
9.	"The Ornamented Sword"	07:19
10.	"The Wilde Dance"	01:59

2004 reissue bonus tracks
No.	Title	Length
6.	"These Lands"	04:27
11.	"Fighting the Tide"	04:01
12.	"A Fool's Hope"	02:38

2005 vinyl reissue bonus tracks
No.	Title	Length
6.	"These Lands"	04:27
11.	"A Hearth Companion's Pride"	03:23

== Personnel ==
- Wulfstan - guitars, lead vocals, bass
- Athelstan - guitars, backing vocals, bass, keyboards
