= New Beginning =

(A) New Beginning(s) may refer to:

== Film and television ==
- Friday the 13th: A New Beginning, a 1985 film in the Friday the 13th series
- Dragonheart: A New Beginning, a 2000 sequel to the film Dragonheart
- Doctor Who at the BBC Radiophonic Workshop Volume 2: New Beginnings 1970–1980, an audio CD featuring music from TV's Doctor Who
- New Beginnings, a DVD Box set featuring three Doctor Who stories (The Keeper of Traken, Logopolis and Castrovalva)
- New Beginnings (2010 TV series), Singaporean drama series
- New Beginnings (2015 TV series), Kenyan soap opera
- A New Beginning, a religious television show and radio program hosted by Greg Laurie
- "New Beginnings" (NCIS: Los Angeles), the 2023 two-part series finale
- "A New Beginning" (Saving Hope), a 2012 television episode
- "A New Beginning" (The Walking Dead), a 2018 television episode

== Other ==
- New Beginnings (Dragonlance), an adventure for fantasy role-playing game
- New Beginnings High School, a secondary school in Indianapolis, Indiana
- A New Beginning (speech), Barack Obama speech at Cairo University, 2009
- A New Beginning (video game), a 2010 adventure game
- NJPW The New Beginning, a professional wrestling event
- The Royal Ranger: A New Beginning, a book by author John Flanagan
- New Beginnings Press
- New Beginnings (sculpture), a bronze sculpture by Larry Anderson

== Music ==
=== Albums ===
- New Beginnings (Don Pullen album) (1988)
- New Beginning (Tracy Chapman album) (1995), or the title song
- New Beginning (SWV album) (1996)
- New Beginning (Stephen Gately album) (2000)
- New Beginnings (Gerald Albright album) (2006)
- New Beginning (Band-Maid album) (2015)
- New Beginnings (Radio Moscow album) (2017)
- New Beginnings (Reason album) (2020)
- New Beginnings, an album by The Advent (1997)
- New Beginnings, an album by Tim (2010)
- A New Beginning (La-Ventura album), 2007
- A New Beginning (Makanda Ken McIntyre album), (2001)

=== Songs ===
- "New Beginning" (Shannon Noll song) (2004)
- "New Beginning" (Bucks Fizz song) (1986)
- "New Beginning" (Stephen Gately song) (2000)
- "New Beginning", a single by the British group Precious from Precious (2000)
- "New Beginning", a song by Matt Brouwer from Imagerical (2001)
- "New Beginnings", a song by the American band Finch from What It Is to Burn (2002)
- "A New Beginning", a song by Good Charlotte from The Young and the Hopeless (2002)
- "A New Beginning", a song by Wolfie's Just Fine (Jon Lajoie) (2016)
