= Ours Is the Kingdom =

Studio album by Forefather
- Released: 2004
- Genre: Viking metal
- Length: 1:00:34
- Label: Karmageddon Media
- Producer: Forefather

Forefather chronology
Engla Tocyme (2002)	Ours Is the Kingdom (2004)	Steadfast (2008)

Ours Is the Kingdom is the fourth album by English metal band Forefather. Its title is a play on the line of the Lord's Prayer "For thine is the kingdom, the power and the glory". The lyrics of the track are a statement against Christianity and a defiant will to reclaim the English kingdom from an alien God. The cover art depicts a dead crusader warrior, an image meant to symbolize Christian decay.

"Our hearts lie not in heaven,
Nor Eastern desert sands."

== Track listing ==
1. "The Shield-Wall" – 4:10
2. "Ours Is the Kingdom" – 4:53
3. "Proud to be Proud" – 4:54
4. "The Golden Dragon" – 5:26
5. "Smashed by Fate" – 4:25
6. "The Sea-Kings" – 4:28
7. "To the Mountains They Fled" – 4:37
8. "The Folk That Time Forgot" – 4:55
9. "Threads of Time" – 6:18
10. "Keep Marching On" – 6:01
11. "Rebel of the Marshlands" – 4:03
12. "Wudugast" – 6:24
