= With Every Bit of Me =

Single by Kevin Borg

from the album The Beginning
- B-side: "With Every Bit of Me" (instrumental version)
- Released: 12 December 2008
- Recorded: 2008
- Genre: Pop
- Songwriters: Andreas Carlsson, Jörgen Elofsson

"With Every Bit of Me" is an English-language song by Maltese singer Kevin Borg, written by Andreas Carlsson and Jörgen Elofsson. It was released as a single in December 2008 following Borg's victory in the fifth season of Swedish Idol. The song was included on his debut studio album, The Beginning (2009). The single topped the Swedish Singles Chart for four consecutive weeks and was certified gold in Sweden. It also reached number one on the Swedish Realtones Chart and Svensktoppen.

== Commercial performance ==
"With Every Bit of Me" reached number one on the Swedish Singles Chart, where it remained for four consecutive weeks.

The single debuted at number one on the Swedish Realtones Chart in week 52 of 2008 and held the position for three weeks, spanning Christmas and New Year. It fell to number two in weeks two and three of 2009, when the chart was topped by ABBA's "Happy New Year" and Lady Gaga's "Poker Face", respectively.

The song spent ten weeks on Svensktoppen, from 18 January to 22 March 2009, including six consecutive weeks at number one from 25 January to 1 March. It left the chart on 29 March.

== Charts ==
Chart (2008–2009)	Peak position
Swedish Singles Chart	1

== Certifications ==
Region	Certification
Sweden (GLF)	Gold

== See also ==
- List of Swedish number-one hits
