= Jem season 2 =

Jem
- Season 2
- Season 2 DVD cover
- No. of episodes: 27

Release
- Original network: first-run syndication
- Original release: September 21, 1987 – January 12, 1988

Season chronology
- ← Previous; Season 1 Next → Season 3

The second season of Jem aired between September 21, 1987, and January 12, 1988, as first-run syndication in the United States.

== Episodes ==
No. overall	No. in season	Title	Written by	Original release date	Prod. code
27	1	"The Talent Search: Part 1"	Christy Marx	September 21, 1987	5205-30
Problems affect Jem & The Holograms when Shana leaves to pursue a fashion career. The Holograms decide to host a talent search to find a new drummer. News of this spreads like fire which also catches the attention of The Misfits. Meanwhile, the Misfits decide to upstage the Talent Search by adding a new Misfit: a hot-tempered saxophone player from England who names herself Jetta. After so many disastrous auditions, the Holograms choose two finalists: A shy, but talented young woman named Carmen Alonzo (nicknamed Raya by her father) and a keen drummer named Craig Phillips. Soon, Raya accidentally discovers Jem's real identity and Eric Raymond attempts to bribe Raya into revealing it to him. Featured songs: "I Like Your Style" – The Misfits, "Believe in Yourself" – Jem and The Holograms, "I Got My Eye on You" – Jem and The Holograms
28	2	"The Talent Search: Part 2"	Christy Marx	September 22, 1987	5205-31
Raya resists Eric's attempts to glean Jem's secret from her. The Misfits discover that the other semi-finalist Craig is Stormer's brother. Eric then decides to use Craig to find out Jem's real identity. When he decides to stand up to Eric, Jetta swipes money from Eric's wallet which she uses to hire a gang to destroy Raya's father's plant nursery so that Raya will go to Eric to get the money where she will reveal Jem's identity. The plan backfires when Raya spots Jetta wearing one of her father's orchids in her hair. Raya lashes out at Jetta, Eric and the Misfits and vows never to reveal Jem's secret to the likes of them. Craig turns up a moment later, threatening Eric to pay restitution to the Alonzo Family for destroying their nursery, and also the Misfits for them threatening to throw Stormer out of the group. After the Talent Search, the winner is announced and Shana returns to the Holograms, this time playing bass guitar. Featured songs: "Show Me the Way", "Beat This", "All's Right with the World" – all by Jem and The Holograms
29	3	"Scandal"	Mary Skrenes	September 23, 1987	5205-28
Jem, the Holograms, the Misfits, and Sean Harrison (the British teen idol Kimber met in The World Hunger Shindig, and has asked her to write a song for him to perform) are all in Venice Beach. The Holograms are there to perform a concert at a roller skating club and to appear the next evening on the Harriet Horn Show, a popular rock music TV personality. While the Holograms think they are not much to gossip about, Jetta stumbles onto Kimber's diary and the Misfits give it to Pitt Slurman, publisher of Cool Trash magazine, the nation's most recognized tabloid. After Kimber and the Holograms recover the diary, Slurman, with help from Pizzazz and Jetta, twist the story, saying Kimber is in love with Sean and he has no feelings for her. Kimber must be strong and stand up to the scandal to come out of it on top. Featured songs: "She Makes an Impression" – Jem and the Holograms, "I Love a Scandal" – The Misfits, "Dear Diary" – Jem and the Holograms
30	4	"One Jem Too Many"	Buzz Dixon	September 24, 1987	5205-38
Jerrica, stressed-out from dealing with tax forms and the usual trouble at home and the office, gets into trouble with a nasty tempered Jem impersonator (Clash), whose outrageous public meltdowns and temper tantrums threaten to destroy the real Jem's career.: Note: Hector Ramirez, a character who frequently appeared in G.I. Joe and Inhumanoids, makes a cameo in this episode.; Featured songs: "Imagine Me" – Jem and The Holograms, "Congratulations" – The Misfits, "The Real Me" – Jem and The Holograms
31	5	"The Bands Break Up"	Marv Wolfman & Cherie Wilkerson	September 28, 1987	5205-34
Upset with the way their bands treat them and over Jerrica's objections, Kimber and Stormer form a friendship and subsequently decide to form a duo and begin performing together. They are extremely popular and try to release an album. A sleazy record executive tricks Kimber into using her shares in Starlight Music as collateral to finance the project. It turns out that it is a ploy by Eric Raymond to get control of Starlight Music when he and his goons try to sabotage the recording process. Frustrated and saddened by Eric's attempts at sabotage and not knowing what to do, Kimber and Stormer go to Jerrica for help. Jerrica applaudes the duo's musical talents and agrees to help finish the album and release it which sells very well. In the end, Jerrica offers Stormer a place as a member of the Holograms but she goes back to the Misfits with the understanding that they will treat her better and Kimber and Stormer remain friends. Featured songs: "I'm Okay" – Kimber and Stormer, "Bad Influence" – Jem and the Holograms/The Misfits, "Gettin' Down to Business" – Jem and the Holograms Other Songs: "Broken Glass" – The Limp Lizards
32	6	"The Fan"	Beth Bornstein	September 29, 1987	5205-36
Jem is kidnapped by a rich fan with help of the Misfits and taken to a copy of Starlight Mansion with actors playing her friends in an attempt to find out her real identity. Featured songs: "Nightmare" – Jem and the Holograms, "Who is She, Anyway?" – The Misfits, "I Believe in Happy Endings" – Jem and the Holograms Other Songs: "Truly Outrageous" – Jem and the Holograms: Note: This is the only episode where every song appeared in other episodes.; Note: This is also the first episode to feature the JEM Girls opening.
33	7	"Fathers' Day"	Roger Slifer	October 1, 1987	5205-40
It's Father's Day, and Kimber is having a bad time, trying to remember her late father but learns to cope after having a talk with Pizzazz's father after the two bond when Kimber gets hurt horseback riding. Mr. Gabor helps Kimber cope with her loss and relates how his wife left him and his daughter; leading to their strained relationship and his attempts at buying her affection. Also, the Holograms and Misfits visit Clash and Video's hometown of Mulberry, Florida for a Father's Day banquet. Featured songs: "Something is Missing in My Life" – Jem and the Holograms, "Let's Blow This Town" – The Misfits, "You're Always in My Heart" – Jem and the Holograms Other songs: "When It's Only Me and the Music" – Jem and the Holograms
34	8	"Treasure Hunt"	Ellen Guon & Christy Marx	October 5, 1987	5205-32
The Starlight Girls compete with Misfits-in-Training in a treasure hunt for literacy. In the end, they learn that knowledge is the greatest prize of all. Note: This is the only episode to be based on a story and not directly written for television. Featured songs: "Take the Time" – Jem and The Holograms, "Ahead of the Game" – The Misfits, "Open a Book" – Jem and The Holograms
35	9	"Aztec Enchantment"	Misty Stewart-Taggart	October 7, 1987	5205-45
The Misfits join up with Clash, who was just given a video camera by her father, and hit Mexico to ruin Jem and the Holograms' new music video directed by Video at the ruins of an ancient Aztec temple. Also, the Holograms befriend a poor young boy who wants to go to the United States. Featured songs: "Aztec Enchantment" – Jem and The Holograms, "Welcome to the Jungle" – The Misfits, "Love Will Show the Way" – Jem and The Holograms
36	10	"Music Is Magic"	Paul Dini	October 14, 1987	5205-39
Jem and the Holograms are set to appear on a Music and Magic TV special, featuring some of the greatest stage magicians in the world. However, matters are made worse when they discover that their rivals the Misfits are also guests on the show. But the real trouble starts when they all keep disappearing one by one, but it turns out that the assistant of one of the magicians is the true villain behind the disappearances because he wants to be the only best magician in the world after being jealous for so long. In the end, the plot is foiled, but he escapes, leaving Jem a note revealing that he will return and the Misfits are tied up. Note: This is one of the six episodes with different animation and where Raya's skin color is lighter than normal. Featured songs: "Abracadabra" – The Misfits, "It Could Be You" – Jem and The Holograms, "Music is Magic" – Jem and The Holograms
37	11	"The Jazz Player"	Michael Reaves	October 15, 1987	5205-41
Jem tries to reunite the Tapps Tucker Quartet, an old jazz group after the Misfits humiliate Tucker on live TV. Meanwhile, Eric Raymond is trying to put out a compilation album of jazz songs. Eric and the Misfits do everything in their power to stop the Tapps Tucker Quartet from getting back together so Eric's jazz album can be released. Featured songs: "Jack, Take a Hike" – The Misfits, "Trapped" – The Misfits, "Jazz Has" – Jem and the Holograms
38	12	"Danse Time"	George Arthur Bloom	October 19, 1987	5205-35
Jem, the Holograms and the Misfits are out to submit a video with the theme of friendship for a competition. But in the process, Danse is injured. Will she heal in time for them to make the perfect video?. Featured songs: "Free and Easy" – The Misfits, "Takes Work" – Jem and the Holograms, "People Who Care" – Jem and the Holograms
39	13	"Roxy Rumbles"	Jina Bacarr	October 20, 1987	5205-44
After the Misfits are humiliated on public television due to Roxy's inability to read, Roxy quits the Misfits, wins the lottery, and returns home to Philadelphia to show off her new lavish lifestyle to her old friends. Meanwhile, Jem and the Holograms are in Philadelphia on a tour to promote literacy. What no one knows is Roxy is illiterate. Roxy, with the help of her high school friends the Red Aces, decides to throw a bigger party than the Holograms. Due to a lack of free merchandise promised by Roxy a riot ensues causing extensive damage. Roxy is quickly overwhelmed by the situation but Jem assists her. The Red Aces decide to learn to read. Roxy's remaining winnings are confiscated by the IRS as she was unable to read a letter sent by them. Ba Nee gives Roxy a book that can help her to learn to read. Roxy, touched by Ba Nee's newfound kindness towards her, accepts the book, just before Eric Raymond and the Misfits come and convince Roxy to rejoin the Misfits, which is what Roxy agrees to do. In the end, Roxy secretly teaches herself to read thanks to the book Ba Nee gave her. Featured songs: "I'm Gonna Change" – Roxy, "Gimme! Gimme! Gimme!" – Roxy of The Misfits, "Open a Book" – Jem and the Holograms
40	14	"Alone Again"	Sandy Fries	October 23, 1987	5205-49
14-year-old Laura Holloway, a new Starlight Girl with a talent for music, falls victim to a drug dealer named Bobby Braddock at her school. Ashley plays an important role again, this time helping to confront Laura and eventually help the police catch Bobby. Note: This is the first episode that does not feature the Misfits. Featured songs: "Alone Again" – Laura, "Nightmare" – Jem and the Holograms, "Look Inside Yourself" – Jem and the Holograms
41	15	"KJEM"	Christy Marx	October 29, 1987	5205-46
A group of college students (including a high school friend of Kimber's) ask Jem to help a struggling radio station that they intern at, that a larger rival station wants to buy out and get rid of. Featured songs: "When It's Only Me and the Music" – Jem and the Holograms, "Listen Up" – The Misfits, "KJEM" – Jem and the Holograms
42	16	"Trick or Techrat"	Misty Stewart-Taggart	October 30, 1987	5205-33
The Holograms plan to save an old opera house from being torn down. As they restore it for a special Halloween concert, the Holograms encounter spooks and ghosts. Featured songs: "It's Fun to be Scared" – Jem and The Holograms, "Don't Look Now" – The Misfits, "We Can Change It" – Jem and The Holograms
43	17	"The Presidential Dilemma"	Beth Bornstein	November 2, 1987	5205-29
A marauding thief is taking all of the American national treasures. Meanwhile, Synergy is apprehended by the government and it's up to Jerrica to save her and stop the marauder. Note: This is one of the six episodes with different animation and where Raya's skin color is lighter than normal. Featured songs: "Star Spangled Fantasy" – The Misfits, "Time Is Runnin' Out" – Jem and The Holograms, "Freedom" – Jem and The Holograms
44	18	"Rock 'n' Roll Express"	Steve Mitchell & Barbara Petty	November 3, 1987	5205-42
Double trouble on the train – a thief and the Misfits – affect Jem on a cross-country train trip. Featured songs: "I'm Taking a Train" – Jem and The Holograms, "It Takes A Lot to Survive" – The Misfits, "All Across This Country" – Jem and The Holograms
45	19	"Mardi Gras"	Mary Skrenes	November 4, 1987	5205-50
The Holograms are invited to wear the pirate Jean Lafitte's jewels for the Mardi Gras celebration. But could Lafitte's ghost be after them? Especially as Shana appears to be a deadringer of his former love Lilly Larose. Featured songs: "Let Me Take You to the Mardi Gras" – Jem and The Holograms, "Surprise! Surprise!" – The Misfits, "Everybody Wears a Mask" – Jem and The Holograms
46	20	"The Middle of Nowhere"	Chris Pelzer	November 5, 1987	5205-43
Jem and the Holograms visit Ba Nee's pen pal, Uto Kenyak, in Alaska. It is up to them to stop the Misfits and Eric Raymond from ruining Alaska and destroying a natural seal habitat. Note: This is one of the six episodes with different animation and where Raya's skin color is lighter than normal. Also, Synergy is not mentioned or seen in this episode. Featured songs: "In the Land of the Midnight Sun" – Jem and The Holograms, "Makin' Mischief" – The Misfits, "Safe and Sound" – Jem and The Holograms
47	21	"Renaissance Woman"	David Wise	November 16, 1987	5205-48
The Holograms and their friends attend a Renaissance fair at an English castle. The false lord-to-be who owns the castle and a Robin Hood-like outlaw trying to oust him both fall in love with Danse. Featured songs: "Love's Not Easy", "To the Rescue", "Flowers in My Hair" – all by Jem and The Holograms Note: "Love's Not Easy" uses the same backing track as "Set Your Sails", which previously appeared in "Island of Deception".
48	22	"Journey to Shangri-La"	Richard Merwin	November 24, 1987	5205-37
The Holograms try to find Shangri-La, the mythological city where all music and art is kept, to add a new twist to their music. When Pizzazz and Roxy end up sick and Shangri-La's music is the only thing that can cure them, it's a race against time to save them both. Note: This is one of the six episodes with different animation and where Raya's skin color is lighter than normal and is also the last episode to feature the original opening credits. Featured songs: "Shangri-La" – Jem and The Holograms, "You Oughta See the View from Here" – The Misfits, "Let the Music Play" – Jem and The Holograms
49	23	"Journey Through Time"	Eric Early	January 6, 1988	5205-52
Techrat's crazy time machine sends Jem and the Holograms back in the time, to 1781 Austria, where they meet Wolfgang Amadeus Mozart, 1944 war-torn England, where they meet the Ben Tiller Orchestra (called "Band" on their poster, an homage to the Glenn Miller Orchestra), and the original Woodstock festival in 1969, where they meet Johnny Beldrix (Jimi Hendrix). Techrat also sends the Misfits back to Woodstock after Pizzazz insults him, where Eric apparently "ruins" their chances of performing at Woodstock. Techrat eventually brings Jem and the Holograms and the Misfits back to the present day where Pizzazz sends Eric back to the time of the dinosaurs (The Late Jurassic Period) after he "ruined" their chances of performing at Woodstock. A baby Brachiosaurus, which was brought back in exchange for Eric, destroys the time machine. Jem and the Holograms finally perform the world history of music concert. Featured songs: "Rock and Roll Is Forever", "We're Making It Happen", "Rockin' Down Through Time" – all by Jem and The Holograms
50	24	"Britrock"	Christy Marx	January 7, 1988	5205-54
The Misfits go to England to meet Jetta's supposedly aristocratic family. Jetta's working-class parents strike up a deal with a Lord of England which ends badly because he is to give up the house and power at midnight to his nephew. Meanwhile, the Holograms come to play a show in London and meet Craig Phillips and help the true earl get back his title which Pizzazz almost got tricked into trying to buy. Note: This episode is on Disc 2 of the Jem and The Holograms season 3 DVD. Featured songs: "I'm Gonna Hunt You Down" – The Misfits, "Between Me and You" – Jem and The Holograms
51	25	"Out of the Past"	Michael Charles Hill	January 8, 1988	5205-55
The Holograms find Emmett Benton's old diary. Reading it, they learn about how they first met, the origin of Starlight Music and how Synergy came into existence. They also discover that Jacqui Benton, Jerrica and Kimber's mother, recorded a master tape of her concert in the 1970s before dying in a plane crash. But when Eric Raymond turns out to have the only copy of the tape, he blackmails Jerrica with it, burning it in his fireplace, but Jerrica and The Holograms decide to make a copy of the tape, with Synergy's help, of course. Featured songs: "First Love" – Jem and The Holograms, "Starlight" – Jacqui Benton
52	26	"Hollywood Jem: Part 1: For Your Consideration..."	Roger Slifer	January 11, 1988	5205-56
Jem is nominated for the Best Actress Oscar for Starbright, while Kimber becomes involved in a wild love triangle. Disc 4 Featured songs: "Hollywood Jem", "You Already Know", "Too Close" – all by Jem and The Holograms
53	27	"Hollywood Jem: Part 2: And the Winner Is..."	Roger Slifer	January 12, 1988	5205-57
The winner of the Best Actress award is announced. Kimber sorts out her love life. Note: Howard Sands, Sean Harrison, Jeff Wright and Anthony Julian make their final appearances in this episode. Featured songs: "Tomorrow Is My Wedding Day", "Happy Ever After", "Hollywood Jem" – all by Jem and The Holograms
