= Engla Tocyme =

Studio album by Forefather
- Released: 2002
- Genre: Black metal, pagan metal
- Length: 39:58 (original edition); 50:19 (2004 reissue)
- Label: Angelisc; Karmageddon Media
- Producer: Forefather

Forefather chronology
The Fighting Man (2000)	Engla Tocyme (2002)	Ours Is the Kingdom (2004)

Engla Tocyme (The Coming of the English) is the third studio album by the English pagan metal band Forefather. It was recorded from September to November 2001 and released in 2002. Preceded by Deep Into Time and The Fighting Man, the album was released through the band's Angelisc Enterprises. In 2004 Karmageddon Media re-released the album with two bonus tracks.

== Track listing ==
No.	Title	Length
1.	"Engla Tocyme" (The Coming of the English)	05:45
2.	"Into the Forever"	05:28
3.	"Iron Hand"	04:41
4.	"Fifeldor"	05:33
5.	"The Swan's Road"	03:36
6.	"Forever in Chains"	06:54
7.	"The Fate of Kings"	08:01
8.	"Ancient Voice" (2004 reissue bonus track)	05:11
9.	"For These Shores" (demo version, 2004 reissue bonus track)	05:10

== Personnel ==
- Athelstan - guitars, bass, keyboards, drums
- Wulfstan - vocals, guitars, bass
- Christian Andersson - cover art
