= Steadfast (Forefather album) =

Studio album by Forefather
- Released: February 2008
- Genre: Viking metal
- Length: 55:20
- Label: Seven Kingdoms Records

Forefather chronology
Ours Is the Kingdom (2004)	Steadfast (2008)	Last of the Line (2011)

Steadfast is the fifth studio album by the United Kingdom band Forefather. The album's artwork is done by Martin Hanford. It was released in February 2008.

== Track listing ==
1. "Brunanburh" - 4:53
2. "Cween of the Mark" - 4:25
3. "Theodish Belief" - 5:20
4. "Hallowed Halls" - 5:51
5. "Steadfast" - 5:06
6. "Three Great Ships" - 5:12
7. "Eostre" - 3:33
8. "Fire from the Sky" - 4:50
9. "Mellowing of the Mains" - 5:32
10. "Wolfhead's Tree" - 4:56
11. "Miri It Is" - 5:42
