= Beginning =

Beginning may refer to:

- Beginning, an album by Pakho Chau
- Beginning (play), a 2017 play by David Eldridge
- Beginning (2020 film), a Georgian-French drama film
- Beginning (2023 film), an Indian Tamil-language drama film
- "Beginning", a song by heavy metal band Kotipelto
- "Beginning", a 2018 track by Toby Fox from Deltarune Chapter 1 OST from the video game Deltarune
- "Beginning", a 2025 track by 2hollis from Star

== See also ==
- Begin (disambiguation)
- Beginnings (disambiguation)
- In the Beginning (disambiguation)
- The Beginning (disambiguation)
