= Kevin Borg =

Maltese pop singer

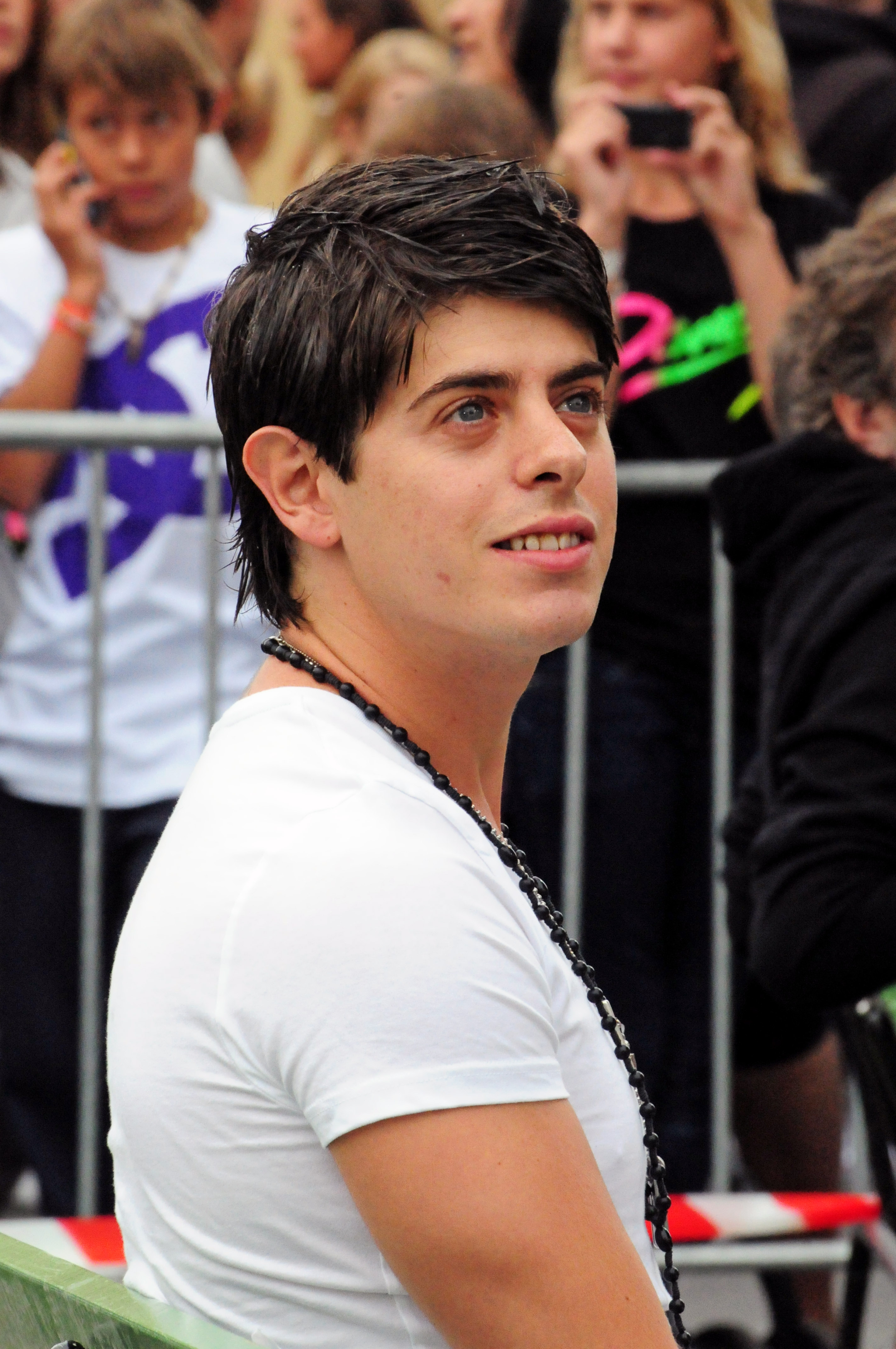
- Kevin Borg in Sweden (2009)

Background information
- Born: Kevin James Borg; 9 June 1986 (age 40); Floriana, Malta
- Origin: Floriana, Malta
- Genre: Pop music
- Occupation: Singer
- Years active: 2006–present
- Label: Sony BMG (2008–present)

Kevin James Borg (born 9 June 1986, in Floriana, Malta), is a Maltese pop singer who lives and works in Sweden. Borg rose to fame as the winner of the fifth series of the Swedish television singing competition Idol in 2008. He was the third male winner and the first in the show's history to be born outside of Sweden, having moved there exactly one year before he was declared winner.

== Biography ==
=== Early life ===
Borg was born and raised in Floriana, Malta. He was a footballer, playing for Floriana FC. His grandfather, Lolly Debattista, was the first Maltese footballer to win the Footballer of the Year Award.

=== Idol 2008 ===
In December 2007, Borg moved to Arvidsjaur, Sweden, to live with his Swedish girlfriend. In autumn 2008, he auditioned for the fifth season of the Swedish singing contest Idol. Although he made it through to the final 12 live finals, Borg was not originally among the competition's front-runners. However, his strong performances caused a rapid growth in his popularity with viewers week by week. After making it to the final two and performing at Stockholm's Globen Arena before a live audience of 16,000 people, Borg was declared the fifth Swedish Idol on 12 December 2008, defeating Alice Svensson. Throughout the live finals, Borg had never fallen into the bottom three contestants.

==== Idol performances ====
- Top 11 Idol 5 years celebration: "Natalie" by Ola Svensson (Safe)
- Top 10 '90s: "All I Wanna Do Is Make Love To You" by Heart (Safe)
- Top 9 ABBA: "Gimme! Gimme! Gimme! (Safe)
- Top 8 Schlager: "Lyssna till ditt hjärta" by Friends (Safe)
- Top 7 Rock: Livin' on a Prayer" by Bon Jovi (Safe)
- Top 6 Soul & Duets: "Signed, Sealed, Delivered I'm Yours" by Stevie Wonder (Safe)
- Top 6 Soul & Duets: "(I've Had) The Time of My Life" by Bill Medley & Jennifer Warnes (Safe)
- Top 5 Love: "If Tomorrow Never Comes" by Ronan Keating (Safe)
- Top 5 Love: "In the Shadows" by The Rasmus (Safe)
- Top 4 Gospel: "Higher and Higher" by Jackie Wilson (Safe)
- Top 4 Gospel: "The Way You Make Me Feel" by Michael Jackson (Safe)
- Top 3 Judge's Choice: "Livin' la Vida Loca" by Ricky Martin (Safe)
- Top 3 Judge's Choice: "Hot In Herre" by Nelly (Safe)
- Top 2 Grand Finale: "You're the Voice" by John Farnham (Winner)
- Top 2 Grand Finale: "Livin' on a Prayer" by Bon Jovi (Winner)
- Top 2 Grand Finale: "With Every Bit of Me" by Kevin Borg - Declared 5th Swedish Idol (Winner)

== After Idol ==
=== 2008: Debut single ===
After having won the Swedish Idol 2008 Borg signed a recording contract with Sony BMG. Borg's coronation song With Every Bit of Me was released one week after he had won the contest. The song was a hit in Sweden, where it debuted at number one and stayed on top of the charts for two consecutive weeks.

=== 2009: First album: The Beginning ===
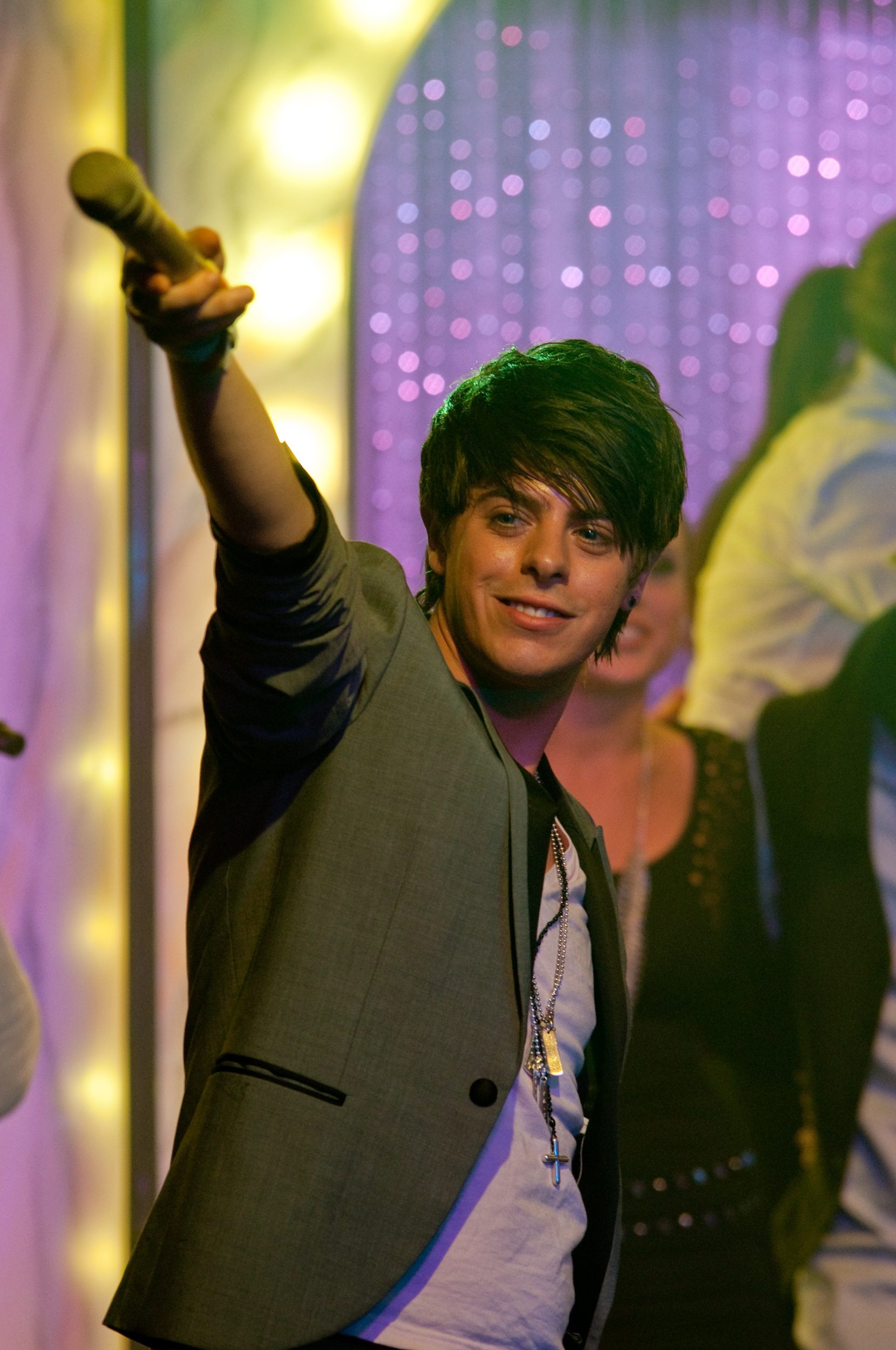
Kevin Borg during a concert

On 4 March 2009 Borg officially released his album The Beginning in Sweden. The album reached number 3 in the charts in Sweden and was certified gold. Borg also released his second single titled Street Lights. The single reached number 10 in Sweden. The album was originally slated for release in February, but Borg was working on a music video for Street Lights and the album was postponed by a week. Borg made a nationwide tour in early-to-mid-2009 in Sweden. In November 2012 Borg's music single "Christmas Time" was placed at number one on Malta's iTunes chart. He co-wrote with Marcos Ubeda and produced the song "Mental Breaker" for the South Korean K-Pop group, Block B. The song reached number 10 on Billboard and other charts.

=== After 2013: Back in Malta ===
Borg participated again in the Maltese national selection for the Eurovision Song Contest 2013 in Malmö with the song "Needing You", which he co-wrote and co-produced with Simon Gribbe, Danne Attlerud, Thomas Thörnholm and Michael Clauss, coming in second place. Borg also co-wrote and co-composed the song "Storyline" with Gribbe, Alin Văduva and Aidan O'Connor as was with in the Romanian Eurovision Song Contest 2013 selection.

In 2016, Borg was cast in the role of Danny Zuko in a production of Grease (musical), with Maxine Aquilina playing the part of Sandy Dumbrowski at Teatru Astra in Gozo, Malta, on Saturday 16 April 2016.

On 20 April 2016, he released his single Young at Heart, distributed by Spinnup through iTunes.

In December 2016, Borg was selected to be part of Malta's national selection for the Eurovision Song Contest 2017 with the song "Follow". He placed third in the national final. In July 2017, Borg co-wrote "Tsunagu", single by a Japanese boyband Arashi with Peter Nord and Hirofumi Sasaki. The single peaked at number one in Japan and became the twelfth best-selling single of 2017 in the country.

== Discography ==
Kevin Borg discography
- Studio albums: 1
- Singles: 7
- Music videos: 2
- B-sides: 2
- Other Charted Songs: 9

=== Studio albums ===
Year	Information	Sweden	Sales and Certifications
2009	The Beginning: First studio album; Released: 4 March 2009; Label: Sony BMG; Format: CD, digital download	3	Swedish sales: 37,000 IFPI: Gold

=== Singles ===
Year	Song	Sweden	Certification	Album
2008	"With Every Bit of Me"	1	Platinum (IFPI)	The Beginning
2009	"Street Lights"	10	—	The Beginning
2009	"The Last Words" (Digital only)	—	—	The Beginning
2011	"Unstoppable"	—	—	Non-album single
2016	"Young at Heart"	—	—	Non-album single
2017	"Follow"	—	—	Non-album single
2020	"Breakdown"	—	—	Non-album single

=== Other charting songs ===
Year	Song	Sweden
2008	"Lyssna till ditt hjärta"	40
2008	"Living on a Prayer"	9
2008	"If Tomorrow Never Comes"	25
2008	"In The Shadows"	37
2008	"Higher and Higher"	29
2008	"The Way You Make Me Feel"	44
2008	"Hot in Here"	26
2008	"Living La Vida Loca"	33
2008	"You're the Voice"	52

=== Musical participation in Malta ===
Malta International TV Song Festival

- 2006: Riflessi - 4th place
- 2007: Jasal il-Jum

Malta Song for Europe

- 2006: You're My Dream - 8th place
- 2007: Whenever - 4th place
- 2013: Needing You - 2nd place
- 2017: Follow - 3rd place
