= In the Beginning =

In the Beginning may refer to:

== Biblical phrase ==
- "In the beginning" (phrase), in the Bible verses of Genesis 1:1 and John 1:1

== Books ==
- In the Beginning (novel), by Chaim Potok
- In the Beginning (Peter Gossage book)
- In the Beginning, a 2004 story arc and collected edition in The Punisher comics
- In the Beginning... Was the Command Line, a 1999 long essay by Neal Stephenson
- In the Beginning: B.C. 4004 (In the Garden of Eden), the first play in George Bernard Shaw's Back to Methuselah series
- "In the Beginning", an illustrated short story in the 1984 anthology book Garfield: His 9 Lives

== Film, radio and television ==
=== Films ===
- Babylon 5: In the Beginning, a 1998 Babylon 5 TV movie
- The Bible: In the Beginning..., a 1966 epic film recounting the first 22 chapters of the Book of Genesis
- In the Beginning (2009 film), a French drama

=== Radio ===
- In the Beginning, a New York radio program produced by Larry Josephson

=== Television episodes ===
- "In the Beginning" (All in Good Faith)
- "In the Beginning" (The Brittas Empire)
- "In the Beginning" (Dante's Cove)
- "In the Beginning" (Dexter)
- "In the Beginning" (God, the Devil and Bob)
- "In the Beginning" (Good Omens)
- "In the Beginning" (The Janice Dickinson Modeling Agency)
- "In the Beginning" (Lavender Castle)
- "In the Beginning" (Legion of Super Heroes)
- "In the Beginning" (Oh, Brother!)
- "In the Beginning" (The Secret Adventures of Jules Verne)
- "In the Beginning" (Superbook)
- "In the Beginning" (Supernatural)
- "In the Beginning" (Swamp Thing)
- "In the Beginning" (Tattooed Teenage Alien Fighters from Beverly Hills)
- "In the Beginning" (True Blood)
- "In the Beginnings", an episode of Cunk on Earth

=== Television series ===
- In the Beginning: The Bible Stories, a 1997 anime series created by Osamu Tezuka
- In the Beginning (miniseries), a 2000 TV film starring Martin Landau
- In the Beginning (TV series), a 1978 American sitcom starring McLean Stevenson

== Music ==
=== Classical ===
- In the Beginning (Copland), a 1947 choral work by Aaron Copland
- In the Beginning, Priscilla McLean (born 1942)
- In the Beginning, Robert Saxton (born 1953)
- In the Beginning, David Rosenboom (born 1947)
- In the Beginning, God, jazz composition by Duke Ellington from Duke Ellington's Sacred Concerts

=== Albums ===
- In the Beginning (Circa 1960), 1970, by The Beatles and the Beat Brothers with Tony Sheridan
- In the Beginning (Blazin' Squad album), 2002
- In the Beginning (The Byrds album), 1988
- In the Beginning (Cro-Mags album), 2020
- In the Beginning (Genesis album), 1974 reissue title of the 1969 album From Genesis to Revelation
- In the Beginning (Isaac Hayes album), 1972 reissue title of the 1968 album Presenting Isaac Hayes
- In the Beginning (Journey album), 1979
- In the Beginning (Hubert Laws album), 1974
- In the Beginning (Madonna album) or Pre-Madonna, a 1997 unauthorized album
- In the Beginning (Nile album), 2000
- In the Beginning 1963–1964, 2012, by Pharoah Sanders
- In the Beginning – The 1981 Singles, a 1986 EP by Play Dead
- In the Beginning (Stevie Ray Vaughan album), 1992
- In the Beginning (Triumph album), 1995 reissue title of the 1976 album Triumph
- In the Beginning (Woody Shaw album), 1983
- In the Beginning: The World of Aretha Franklin 1960–1967, an album by Aretha Franklin
- In the Beginning... (album), 1985, by Malice
- In the Beginning by Roy Buchanan, 1974
- In the Beginning, a compilation of recordings by Hawkwind also released on The Text of Festival, 1985
- In the Beginning, by Lonnie Smith, 2013
- In the Beginning..., by British rock band Salem, 2010
- In the Beginning, an EP by Kate Stewart, 2018
- In the Beginning, by The Slits

=== Songs ===
- "In the Beginning" (1954 song), by Frankie Laine
- "In the Beginning" (The Moody Blues song), 1969
- "In the Beginning", by Amorphis from Tales from the Thousand Lakes
- "In the Beginning", by E.Y.C.
- "In the Beginning", by Genesis from From Genesis to Revelation
- "In the Beginning", by K'Naan from The Dusty Foot Philosopher
- "In the Beginning", by Mötley Crüe from Shout at the Devil
- "In the Beginning", by Onefour
- "In the Beginning", by Stephen Schwartz from the musical Children of Eden
- "In the Beginning", by The Stills from Without Feathers

== See also ==
- Begin (disambiguation)
- Beginning (disambiguation)
- The Beginning (disambiguation)
