= Jem season 3 =

Jem
- Season 3
- Season 3 DVD cover
- No. of episodes: 12

Release
- Original network: first-run syndication
- Original release: February 2 – May 2, 1988

Season chronology
- ← Previous; Season 2

The third and final season of Jem aired between February 2, 1988, and May 2, 1988, as first-run syndication in the United States.

== Episodes ==
No. overall	No. in season	Title	Written by	Original release date	Prod. code
54	1	"The Stingers Hit Town: Part 1"	Christy Marx	February 2, 1988	5205-58
The final season opens at the headquarters of Misfits Music where Eric Raymond is fed up with the Misfits' childish behavior, so he sells everything he owns to buy Misfits Music from Harvey Gabor. However, instead, he decides to offer a recording contract to a new band called The Stingers. He invites them to stay in Harvey's mansion much to Pizzazz's dismay, until she falls madly in love with Riot when she meets him. Jerrica also discovers The Stingers and decides to offer them a recording contract but the lead singer Riot tells her that only Jem can make him join Starlight Music. Rio and Pizzazz both try to keep Riot away from Jem which causes a riot and Jem and Riot disappear during the chaos. Featured songs: "Stingers Theme" – The Stingers, "Like a Dream" – Jem and The Holograms, "Perfect Match" – The Stingers
55	2	"The Stingers Hit Town: Part 2"	Christy Marx	February 3, 1988	5205-59
Riot wants Jem to leave Rio. Rapture decides to "help" Pizzazz win Riot's affections. The Stingers move into the Starlight Mansion where they have a run-in with the Holograms due to their cruelty towards the Starlight Girls. The remaining Misfits leave Pizzazz due to her unhealthy obsession with Riot. Eric and Pizzazz lead a group of Stingers fans to the Starlight Mansion where the Stingers are staying and Eric offers half of Misfits Music to Riot. Jerrica refuses to give half of Starlight Music to Riot so he leaves with Eric, who changes the name of his company to Stingers Sound. There, they sign with him and he signs half of the company to Riot. Featured songs: "Lovesick" – The Misfits, "Take It or Leave It" – The Stingers, "Now" – Jem and The Holograms/The Misfits/The Stingers
56	3	"Video Wars"	Cary Bates & Greg Weisman	February 4, 1988	5205-47
Clash, disguised as a film student named Sarah, tries to get even with the Holograms by making a bad video of them to replace Video's. While spending time with them, Clash becomes friends with the Holograms, and she loses track of where her loyalties lie-with the Misfits, her old friends who treat her badly, or with her new friends the Holograms, who are nice to her. Notes: This is one of the six episodes with different animation and where Raya's skin color is lighter than normal. It also marks the final speaking role of Clash. Featured songs: "Like a Dream", "One of Those Days", "The Last Laugh" – all by Jem and The Holograms Bonus Song: "We're Off and Runnin'" – The Misfits
57	4	"Beauty and the Rock Promoter"	Clare Noto	February 5, 1988	5205-53
Jem throws herself into the role of "Beauty" in a rock opera version of Beauty and the Beast. She finds herself intrigued by the actor playing The Beast, much to the chagrin of Rio. She also works herself until she is forced to sleep for days and Pizzazz replaces her in the play, but Jem quickly recovers and gets her role back before the play ends. Featured songs: "You'll Never Win My Love" - Jem and The Holograms, "Let Me Go" - Jem and the Beast, "Our Love Makes You Beautiful" - Jem and The Holograms
58	5	"Homeland, Heartland"	Carla Conway	February 8, 1988	5205-51
Giselle "Danse" Dvorak returns to Zagreb in her home country of Yugoslavia (which is known today as Croatia) to learn more about her family. There, she falls in love with the lead ballet dancer Stefan and also finds out more about her mother's (Nadia Dvorak) past in the ballet. But Victor Korsach, the director of the Zagreb Ballet, has other plans in mind for Danse, and is determined to make her his. Danse is also reunited with her father. Notes: This is one of the six episodes with different animation and where Raya's skin color is lighter than normal. It is also the final appearances in the series for Danse and Video. Featured songs: "Music and Danse", "Falling in Love with a Stranger", "Music and Danse (second time)" - all by Jem and The Holograms
59	6	"Midsummer Night's Madness"	Evelyn A.R. Gabai	February 9, 1988	5205-60
Jem, the Holograms and the Stingers go to Greece to play in a music festival. Jerrica and Rio have a fight, and thanks to advice from Synergy, who is disguised as an Oracle, she creates a new identity, Jamie. When Rio falls for Jamie, she thinks it means he was never truly loyal to Jerrica in the first place. Meanwhile, Riot tries to make Rio jealous by flirting with Jerrica. Note: Synergy makes her final appearance in this episode. Featured songs: "Can't Get My Love Together" - Jem and The Holograms, "Destiny" - The Stingers, "Midsummer Night's Madness" - Jem and The Holograms
60	7	"The Day the Music Died"	Roger Slifer	February 11, 1988	5205-61
Riot whisks a stressed-out Jem away on a Mexican cruise; the pair then disappears and no one hears from them for three months. Without Jerrica, Eric Raymond and the Misfits are able to take complete control of Starlight Music and the Starlight Foundation. Pizzazz then forces the Holograms and the remaining Stingers to join the Misfits, thus making the mega group rule the radio airwaves. Rio, the Holograms, and the Stingers have to find Riot and Jem fast in order to get their lives back to normal. In the end, Eric and Pizzazz give Starlight Music and the Starlight Foundation back to Jerrica when the Starlight Girls drive them insane, forcing Pizzazz to walk away while Eric flees in a panic. Jem & The Holograms then perform a reunion concert so they can pay off the debt that Pizzazz ran up. Featured songs: "Under My Spell" – The Stingers, "Top of the Charts" – The Misfits, "All's Right with the World" – Jem and The Holograms Note: In this episode, Kimber, Raya, Aja, Pizzazz, Riot, and Ashley talk directly to the viewers. This episode marks the final speaking roles of Roxy, Jetta and Eric Raymond and the final appearance of Harvey Gabor. In addition, a closing sequence where Jem would also talk directly to the viewers was intended, but it was cut from the final print.
61	8	"That Old Houdini Magic"	Jina Bacarr	February 15, 1988	5205-62
In order to get the Stingers onto the bill of a certain concert, Rapture cons superstitious arranger Mrs. Farnsworth into thinking she is possessed by the spirit of famous magician Harry Houdini. Jem and magician Astral team up to expose Rapture's lies. Meanwhile, Minx becomes attracted to Techrat. Note: This episode marks the final appearance of Techrat. Featured songs: "She's Got the Power" – Jem and The Holograms, "Mind Games" – The Stingers, "Believe/Don't Believe" – The Stingers/Jem and The Holograms
62	9	"Straight from the Heart"	Buzz Dixon	February 17, 1988	5205-63
A new fashion designer, Regine Cesaire comes to town and decides whether her loyalties lie with Jem and The Holograms or the Stingers. Featured songs: "It Depends on the Mood I'm In" - Jem and The Holograms, "All in the Style" - The Stingers, "Straight from the Heart" - Jem and The Holograms
63	10	"A Change of Heart"	Christy Marx	February 18, 1988	5205-64
When Minx has a near-death experience, she decides to change her attitude and become kind and helpful, much to the dismay of Riot and Rapture. She sets out to do all kinds of good deeds for Rio, Jerrica, Jem and the Holograms to make up for her past bad behavior. Unfortunately, the new Minx turns out to be much more trouble that the old Minx. Featured songs: "Outta My Way" - The Misfits, "Are You Feeling Alright?" - The Stingers, "Too Much" - Jem and The Holograms
64	11	"Riot's Hope"	Roger Slifer	February 22, 1988	5205-65
The Stingers' first major album is released, however Riot's relationship with his strict military father is still strained. When it reaches a point where his mother is hospitalized with a severe illness, Jem steps in to attempt to reconcile the two men. Along the way, Riot tells Jem his story, including how he met Minx and Rapture, and how they eventually became the Stingers. Featured songs: "Take It or Leave It", "It's a Hard, Hard, Life", "Let Me Be" - all by The Stingers Note: This is one of the two episodes not to feature any songs by Jem and the Holograms.
65	12	"A Father Should Be..."	Christy Marx	May 2, 1988	5205-66
In this final episode, Jem and The Holograms (with help from Riot and his dad) search for Ba Nee's father. The Holograms travel to different parts of the country using information provided by Riot and speak to various people they think may be Ba'Nee's father. At first, Rio and Raya travel to Nebraska to meet Leonard Martin, one of the potential fathers who is a paraplegic. Jem and Shana travel to Las Vegas where they are tricked by a deadbeat gambler named Andy Martin who kidnaps Ba Nee and tries to extort $1 million from Jem by keeping her hostage at the abandoned zoo. Finally, Kimber and Aja, who managed to convince the doctor who treated Martin O'Carolan to reveal his whereabouts then meet him and realize that he is Ba Nee's true father after spotting a painting of a Vietnamese woman who looks just like Ba Nee. Martin turns out to be an amnesiac Vietnam veteran and a very gifted artist who has no memory of her. Martin comes back to Starlight Mansion and upon hearing about Ba Nee's kidnapping; he and Jem go to the rescue. During the rescue, he regains his lost memory in flashbacks and the two reunite. Jem then sends Andy into a panic with holograms of gorillas, driving Andy towards Martin, who then angrily pushes him into the monkey cage. At Starlight Mansion, the Holograms and the Starlight girls as well as the Stingers have a going away party for Ba'Nee. The Misfits make a rare guest appearance, arriving with going away presents as well and make peace with Jem and The Holograms and Ba Nee says goodbye to Jerrica and they affirm their love for each other. Featured songs: "Family Is" - Jem and The Holograms, "A Father Should Be" - Ba Nee, "This Is Farewell" - Jem and The Holograms/The Misfits/The Stingers/Rio Pacheco
