= Begin (surname) =

Begin or Bégin is a surname. Notable people with the surname include:

- Benny Begin (born 1943), Israeli politician
- Catherine Bégin (1939–2013), Canadian actress
- Charles Auguste Frédéric Bégin (1835–1901), French general and Acting Governor of Cochinchina
- Floyd Lawrence Begin (1902–1977), American Roman Catholic bishop
- Jean Bégin (1944–1991), Canadian ice hockey coach
- Johanne Bégin (born 1971), Canadian water polo player
- Joseph-Damase Bégin (1900–1977), Canadian politician
- Louis-Nazaire Bégin (1840–1925), Canadian Roman Catholic Church prelate
- Menachem Begin (1913–1992), Israeli prime minister
- Monique Bégin (1936–2023), Canadian politician
- Paul Bégin (born 1943), Canadian politician
- René Bégin (1912–1980), Canadian politician
- Romeo Bégin (1895–1972), Canadian politician
- Steve Bégin (born 1978), Canadian ice hockey player
