= A New Beginning (La-Ventura album) =

Studio album by La-Ventura
- Released: 2007
- Genre: Rock; Melodic metal
- Length: 41:35
- Label: Razar Ice Records

La-Ventura chronology
A New Beginning (2007)	White Crow (2013)

Professional ratings
Review scores
Source	Rating
Metal.de	5/10
Powermetal.de	8/10

A New Beginning is the first studio album by the Dutch rock/melodic metal band La-Ventura.

== Track listing ==
No.	Title	Length
1.	"Deadline"	4:21
2.	"Memoria"	3:20
3.	"Only Love Will Find Its Way"	4:22
4.	"Trefoil"	3:22
5.	"Remind You"	3:49
6.	"Cry"	4:11
7.	"Messed Up"	3:51
8.	"A New Beginning"	3:31
9.	"The Hunter"	3:06
10.	"Right & Righteousness"	3:30
11.	"FOTS"	4:12
Total length:		41:35

Notes

- Re-released in 2008 by Renaissance Records.
- In 2009, the debut has also been released in Germany, Switzerland and Austria in June 2009, through the efforts of Gordeon Music, Dr-Music Distribution and Intergroove.
- A video was made for "Trefoil".

== Personnel ==
- Michael "Mike" Saffrie - bass
- Sascha "Saz" Kondic - guitars
- Carla van Huizen-Douw - vocals
- Erwin Polderman (ex-Orphanage) - drums
- Marco van Boven - keys
