= Begin =

Begin or Bégin may refer to:

== People ==
- Begin (surname)

== Music ==
- Begin (band), a Japanese pop trio
- Begin (David Archuleta album)
- begin (Riyu Kosaka album)
- Begin (Lion Babe album)
- Begin (The Millennium album)
- beGin, an album by Gin Lee
- Begin, an album by Cyndi Wang
- "Begin", a song by BTS from Wings
- "Begin", a song by Haste the Day from Coward
- "Begin", a song by Parkway Drive from Horizons
- "Begin", a song by Shakthisree Gopalan, 2016

== Other ==
- Bégin, Quebec, a municipality in Canada
- Begin (video game), a 1984 video game
- Highway 50 (Israel/Palestine) or Begin Expressway, a freeway in Jerusalem
- Begin Road, a street in Tel Aviv, Israel
- Begin block, a grouping of statements in programming languages

== See also ==
- Beginning (disambiguation)
- Beginnings (disambiguation)
- Origin (disambiguation)
- Source (disambiguation)
- Start (disambiguation)
