= The Beginning (Kevin Borg album) =

Studio album by Kevin Borg
- Released: 4 March 2009
- Genre: pop, rock
- Length: 42 minutes
- Label: Sony Music Entertainment Sweden

The Beginning is the debut studio album by Maltese pop singer Kevin Borg, which he earned the right to record after winning Idol 2008 in Sweden where he is now residing. It was released in 2009.

== Tracks ==
1. Street Lights
2. A Hundred Different Ways
3. Ready to Fly
4. The Light You Leave On
5. Paint It Black
6. Beating Me Up
7. The Last Words
8. Runegod
9. 3rd Wonder
10. Kisses I Wanna Give Ye
11. My Love
12. With Every Bit of Me

== Chart positions ==
Chart (2009)	Peak position
Sweden	3
