= New Beginnings (2015 TV series) =

- Genre: Soap opera
- Written by: Grace Kahaki, Joy Kendi
- Directed by: Grace Kahaki
- Creative director: Philippe Bresson
- Starring: Maya Hayakawa; Joed Kariuki; Neville Misati; Diana Nderitu; Denise Gordon; Habida Ebo; Nouhoum Kone
- Country of origin: Kenya
- Original language: English

Production
- Executive producer: Philippe Bresson
- Producer: Gayleen Akinyi
- Editors: Steve Biko; Sally Liani; Patrick Kiprono; Emmanuel Otieno; Eliud Mwangi
- Camera setup: Single-camera
- Running time: 22-26 minutes
- Production company: Insignia Kenya Productions

Original release
- Network: KTN
- Release: 9 October 2015 – 14 October 2016

New Beginnings is a Kenyan soap opera that made its debut on 9 October 2015. It takes love, envy, lust and deceit as the main thematic concerns. It stars Maya Hayakawa, Joed Kariuki, Neville Misati, Diana Nderitu and Habida Ebo.

== Plot ==

New Beginnings is a drama about a love triangle between Julia, Derek and his best friend Sean. It delves into their lives and relationships. Sean wakes up from a five-year coma. His wife, Julia who had moved on with her life since she had lost hope of Sean's recovery, had married Sean's best friend Derek. As Sean is recovering his body strength, he meets Natasha, his nurse and they start a great friendship that later upgrades to love affair. This makes Julia who is still in love with Sean, is not able to do anything because she must keep appearances to her husband, Derek who turned abusive to her. Since the truth is right under everyone's nose, it will come out and it may cost the trust, good relationships and family ties that the characters had.

== Series overview ==
Season	Episodes	Originally aired	
Season	Episodes	First aired	Last aired
1	18	9 October 2015	19 February 2016
2	7	26 February 2016	8 April 2016
3	14	15 April 2016	15 July 2016
4		29 July 2016	14 October 2016

== Cast ==
- Maya Hayakawa as Julie
- Joed Kariuki as Derek
- Neville Misati as Sean (Note: Neville Misati played Sean in the first few episodes with Nouhoum Kone replacing him thereafter.)
- Denise Gordon as Catherine
- Diana Nderitu as Lexi
- Habida Ebo as Natasha
- Mugambi Nnega as Randy
- Pete Openda as Alex
- Divina Waweru as Tess
- Amari Hayakawa as Jimmy
- Randy Selwano as Dr. Kimani
- Peter Oruka as Henchman
- Douglas EbCole as Bruno
- Julisa Rowe as Dr. Brown
- Roly Ablah as Christian
- Erastus Kimani as Dr. Lodwa
- Melissa Kiplagat as Barbra
- Peter Oruka as Henchman
- Cyrus Kifuse as Jose
- Nouhoum Kone as Sean

== Broadcast ==
New Beginnings made its debut on Kenyan television at KTN on October 9, 2015 at 8:30 pm. It also premiered on Ebony Life TV, DSTV channel 165.

== Awards and nominations ==
Year	Association	Award	Recipient	Result	Ref(s)
2016	Riverwood Academy Awards	New Beginnings	Best TV series	Pending	
2016	Riverwood Academy Awards	Best Supporting Actress	Diana Nderitu	Pending	
