= Jem season 1 =

Jem
- Season 1
- Season 1 DVD cover
- No. of episodes: 26

Release
- Original network: first-run syndication
- Original release: November 3, 1985 – March 15, 1987

Season chronology
- Next → Season 2

The first season of Jem aired between November 3, 1985, and March 15, 1987, as a first-run syndication in the United States. The season has a total of 26 episodes each with a running time of approximately 22 minutes. The first 5 episodes initially aired as 15 7-minute segments with each episode broken into 3 parts. There was a later version of the first 5 episodes which came out in 1986 when the show first came into syndication where some scenes from the original 7 minute segments were either altered, extended (like a lot of the music videos sequences) or removed entirely.

== Episodes ==
No. overall	No. in season	Title	Written by	Original release date	Prod. code
1	1	"The Beginning (Part 1)"	Christy Marx	October 6, 1985	5205-08
Emmett Benton suddenly dies and leaves his business to his daughter Jerrica and his partner Eric Raymond. Starlight House is falling apart and when Jerrica visits Eric at Starlight Music to get money to fix the house, Eric refuses to share Starlight Music with her and wants to take over Starlight Music to promote his new group the Misfits who Jerrica takes an instant disliking to, referring to them as "trash". At night, Jerrica is visited by her late father's creation: Synergy, a high-tech computer that has the ability to generate holograms. Using Synergy, Jerrica becomes Jem and along with her sister Kimber and two foster sisters Aja Leith and Shana Elmsford becoming Jem and the Holograms where they perform at a rigged Battle of the Bands held by Eric who is angered by this as he was hoping for the Misfits to win and challenges Jerrica to another battle of the bands in six months between his group The Misfits and her group Jem and the Holograms. The winners get Starlight Music, a film contract, and a mansion. Eric hires a henchman named Zipper to break into Starlight House to make Jerrica nervous. When he is caught red-handed by Jerrica and the Holograms, he flees in a panic, accidentally setting fire to Starlight House. Featured songs: "Outta My Way" – The Misfits, "Only the Beginning" – Jem and The Holograms, "Winning Is Everything" – The Misfits Other songs: "Broken Glass" – The Limp Lizards
2	2	"Disaster (Part 2)"	Christy Marx	October 27, 1985	5205-09
When Starlight House is burnt down, Jerrica and the Holograms go to Howard Sands, who offered the mansion in the battle of the bands contest. Jem and the Holograms put on a concert for him and explain what happened. He agrees to let the Starlight girls live in his mansion until the contest is over. This makes the Misfits angry so Eric sends Zipper to the mansion to plant a bomb to get Jem and the Holograms out. When they are invited to a yacht party, the Misfits crash and cause a ruckus, sending the yacht spinning out of control. Featured songs: "Like a Dream" – Jem and The Holograms, "Click/Clash" – Jem and The Holograms/The Misfits, "Makin' Mischief" – The Misfits
3	3	"Kimber's Rebellion (Part 3)"	Christy Marx	November 17, 1985	5205-10
Jem and the Holograms head to Paris to shoot their first video, "Twilight in Paris". Eric sends Zipper to Paris to sabotage the video. Kimber is jealous of all the attention Jem gets in the video shoot. Eric offers Kimber a solo contract. Kimber declines, but later feels unappreciated and decides to leave the Holograms. The Holograms go to Kimber's favorite radio station and express their appreciation for her. Fortunately, she hears them, and the band makes up. Meanwhile, Ashley, one of the Starlight girls, grows angry with Jerrica and the Holograms, running off and befriending the Misfits, who use her to get Jem. Featured songs: "Twilight in Paris", "Gettin' Down to Business", "I Got My Eye on You" – all by Jem and The Holograms
4	4	"Frame Up (Part 4)"	Christy Marx	December 8, 1985	5205-11
The Holograms are scheduled to play a concert at a casino in Las Vegas, Nevada. When they discover that the Misfits are their opening act, they start to worry. The Misfits bring along Ashley and use her to lure Aja away, hoping that if Aja isn't there, the Holograms can't play and the Misfits will headline instead. Fortunately, Aja comes back in time, and they perform. Unfortunately, while the girls are on stage Eric Raymond's goons steal the money from the concert and plant the money in Jem's room where the police find the money and arrest Jem. Stormer and Ashley team up to tell the truth, and Jem's name is cleared. Meanwhile, Eric Raymond sends a private investigator named Malone to investigate Jem, to try to discover her true identity. Malone uncovers Synergy in the abandoned drive-in where he takes pictures of her and then "destroys" her. Featured songs: "Deception", "Too Close", "Truly Outrageous" – all by Jem and The Holograms
5	5	"The Battle of the Bands (Part 5)"	Christy Marx	December 29, 1985	5205-12
After "destroying" Synergy, Malone takes the pictures he has taken to Eric Raymond. The Holograms realize that their secret is out, rush to Starlight drive-in to find the "destroyed" Synergy who then reveals that it was only a hologram she projected to trick Malone. The Holograms move Synergy to the mansion before Eric and Zipper arrive. On the night of Battle of the Bands, Eric holds Ashley hostage and tells Jerrica to meet him at the Starlight drive-in. Jem and the Holograms arrive at the drive-in to demand Ashley's whereabouts, but it turns out to be a trap. Jem and the Holograms turn the tables on their captors while Rio rescues both them and Ashley in time for the contest. Jem and the Holograms burst onto the stage just as the Misfits are about to be declared winners by default who then go on to win, and Jerrica regains total control of Starlight Music. Featured songs: "She's Got the Power" – Jem and The Holograms, "Takin' It All" – The Misfits, "Music Is Magic" – Jem and The Holograms
6	6	"Starbright: Part 1: Falling Star"	Christy Marx	July 5, 1986	5205-01
Jem stars in Howard Sands' new movie, part of the prize she and the Holograms won in the Battle of the Bands. But Pizzazz convinces her father to buy the movie studio that is making the film and give ownership to Eric who quickly seizes control of the film and adds the Misfits to the cast. Eric places the focus of the film on the Misfits and Jem and the Holograms are relegated to supporting roles. Finally fed up with the Misfits' disruptive and tyrannical behavior, Jem and the Holograms, along with Video, quit the movie. But Jerrica receives shocking news about Starlight Girl Ba Nee, who has been diagnosed with a rare optical condition that will leave her blind within a matter of months. Featured songs: "Who Is He Kissing" – Jem and The Holograms, "Jealousy" – Jem and The Holograms, "Universal Appeal" – The Misfits: UK Network: TCC (28 May 1994); Note: This was the first episode to air as a full episode instead of segments.
7	7	"Starbright: Part 2: Colliding Stars"	Christy Marx	July 12, 1986	5205-02
Horrified at the news of Ba Nee's impending blindness, Jerrica learns from her doctor that there is an experimental laser surgical procedure that could save Ba Nee's vision. However, the cost of the surgery is a staggering $250,000. Having canceled all their tour dates to star in the movie, Aja hits on the idea to divert funds from Starlight Music to cover the cost. But when they arrive there, they find the building closed down and without power. Joanie, the business manager of Starlight Music, tells the group that Eric has drained huge sums of money from Starlight Music to promote the Misfits' movie. Left with no other option, Jem and the Holograms are forced to return to the film. Eric's demands push the group to their limits once again, especially when Jem nearly falls from a set display suspended several dozen feet in the air. Video records the accident hoping to use it to shut down the film's production, but Jem pleads with her not to, because of Ba Nee's surgery. During a dangerous motorcycle scene for the movie, Kimber is caught in the middle of a series of explosions set off by Roxy and Clash, and is almost killed. She pleads with actor Nick Mann to save her but he rides off and leaves her in the explosion. Featured songs: "Congratulations" – The Misfits, "Show Me the Way" – Jem and The Holograms, "Love Is Doin' It to Me" – Jem and The Holograms: UK Network: TCC (4 June 1994)
8	8	"Starbright: Part 3: Rising Star"	Christy Marx	July 19, 1986	5205-03
Stuntman Jeff Wright, despite Kimber being cruel to him earlier on rides into the explosion and rescues Kimber. Infuriated, Jem and the Holograms quit the production permanently, along with most of the crew who witnessed the accident. In hospital, Jeff forgives Kimber for treating him cruelly and they kiss. Jem rallies the crew to continue the movie, but with a new plot and title: Starbright, while the Misfits' demanding behavior finally causes what remains of the original crew to walk off the set. Without the backing of a studio and knowing that the money raised will pay for Ba Nee's surgery, each crew member donates their services as well as needed equipment. Meanwhile, a disguised Clash sneaks onto the set of Starbright to spy on the cast and crew, only to be caught by Georgia, the makeup artist who had recently quit the movie as well. Clash steals the tape of Jem's accident, along with most of the film equipment, but Jem and the cast manage to recover it after a lengthy car chase. Starbright proves to be a box office smash, while the Misfits Movie bombs quickly. The Holograms' first share in the box office proceeds go to pay for Ba Nee's surgery, which is a complete success, then Jerrica takes Ba Nee to see the movie. Featured songs: "Putting It All Together" – Jem and The Holograms, "Welcome to the Jungle" – The Misfits, "People Who Care" – Jem and The Holograms
9	9	"The World Hunger Shindig"	Mary Skrenes	July 26, 1986	5205-04
Jem and the Holograms are invited to Houston to perform at a concert benefiting the victims of world hunger. When The Misfits learn of the concert, they try to horn in. Sally Brand, the woman behind the World Hunger Shindig tells them they can perform, but can't be on the live album unless another group backs out. Eric Raymond schemes to keep the Holograms away from the concert and to make a tidy sum of money for himself in the process. Featured songs: "We Can Make a Difference" – Jem and The Holograms, "Gimme! Gimme! Gimme!" – The Misfits, "Share a Little Bit of Yourself" – Jem and The Holograms/The Misfits
10	10	"Adventure in China"	Beth Bornstein	August 23, 1986	5205-05
Jem and the Holograms are invited to perform a special concert in China. The Misfits tag along and take notice of Jem's reluctance to part with her Jem star earrings while going through customs. They steal the earrings, creating duplicates which they scatter all over China, leading Jerrica and the Holograms on a wild goose chase to recover them in time for the concert. On the night of the concert, Jerrica witnesses a Chinese girl named Lin fending off a group of bullies who tried to steal the Jem star earrings which she happened to be wearing. Jerrica congratulates Lin on her bravery who then tells her that Jem and the Holograms are her favorite band. Jerrica tearfully tells Lin that there won't be a concert due to Jem having bad luck. Lin gives Jerrica the earrings telling her that they will bring Jem good luck. They turn out to be the real pair. Jem and the Holograms perform a song which they dedicate to Lin. After the concert, Jem gives Lin a pair of the fake earrings as a thank you and Lin gratefully wears them, promising Jem that she will never take them off and receives a hug from Jem. Featured songs: "You Can't Catch Me" – The Misfits, "Something Is Missing in My Life" – Jem and The Holograms, "Love Unites Us" – Jem and The Holograms
11	11	"Last Resorts"	Roger Slifer	August 30, 1986	5205-06
Jem and The Holograms take a much needed vacation to a Colorado ski resort owned by Rick Franklin, an old friend of Howard Sands. Mr. Franklin tells the Holograms that his resort is being threatened by another resort owned by Eric Raymond. Eric and the Misfits attempt to sabotage the resort, in order to bankrupt Franklin so that he will sell the resort to Eric. Meanwhile, Rio and Swenson, the handsome ski instructor face off in a contest for Jem's attentions. In order to settle the matter of which resort controls the mountain, The Holograms and The Misfits face off in a ski contest. Eric hires a group of thugs to fix the race so that the Misfits will win which they do. Rio and Jem find gold which is why Eric was so eager to take over the resort. Swenson has the thugs tied up and makes them confess that Eric hired them to fix the race. The Misfits are disqualified and Jem and the Holograms perform a concert in a cabin. Featured songs: "You Gotta Be Fast" – The Misfits, "It's Workin' Out/It's Doin' Me In" – Jem and The Holograms/The Misfits, "Love Is Here" – Jem and The Holograms
12	12	"In Stitches"	Mary Skrenes	September 6, 1986	5205-07
Several girl groups from all over the world are invited to take part in a rock fashion contest in Venice headed by Italian music promoter Tony Cassini. Shana is a bit nervous about the competition and The Misfits try to rattle her by chipping away at her confidence. But the last laugh is on them when their own designer drops out of the contest. Unfortunately this prompts them to get Zipper, Eric's hired henchman to steal the costumes Shana's designed for the Holograms. Since The Misfits stole Jem & The Holograms' costumes, they come second while Jem comes first and Shana receives credit for both the Holograms and the Misfits' costumes. Featured songs: "It Depends on the Mood I'm In" – Jem and The Holograms, "Designing Woman" – The Misfits, "Time Is Runnin' Out" – Jem and The Holograms
13	13	"The Music Awards: Part 1"	Christy Marx	September 13, 1986	5205-13
Jem, The Holograms and The Misfits become so focused on beating each other at the upcoming annual Music Awards that they neglect their duties to the Starlight Girls. Deidre, one of the girls is so hurt by this she runs away. Ba Nee, not wanting Deidre to go alone decides to come with her, and Krissie goes as well to keep an eye on them. Meanwhile, Video introduces the Holograms to Giselle Dvorak (Danse), a talented stage dancer, who has a special request for them. Pizzazz persuades her father to buy her a music company which he does and opens it in a new building right opposite Starlight Music which is named Misfits Music. Eric Raymond hires Techrat to cause trouble for the Holograms. The girls run away to the Misfits, who anonymously report that Jerrica is mistreating her Starlight Girls. At Starlight Music, Jem finds out from Lin-Z that the Haven House Benefit is the same night as the Music Awards and that missing the event would hurt her chances to win this prestigious award. She backs out and goes home only to learn about the runaways. The Holograms search everywhere but there is no trace of them. Feeling guilty for ignoring them, Jem decides to perform at the benefit anyway with the hopes that the girls will hear about it and come home. Featured songs: "She Makes an Impression" – Jem and The Holograms, "When It's Only Me and the Music" – Jem and The Holograms, "I Am a Giant" – The Misfits Note: When this episode first aired, the show provided a hotline for runaway kids to call and get help. Due to the high call volume the system went down temporarily.
14	14	"The Music Awards: Part 2"	Christy Marx	September 20, 1986	5205-14
As Jerrica and the others continue their search for the girls, The Misfits stage a publicity stunt to garner more attention toward their appearance at the Music Awards. Deidre, Krissy, Ba Nee, and their new friend Danny run afoul of a couple of thugs, who force Danny to steal from a local electronics store for them. They manage to escape and are directed to Haven House, where Danse finds them and brings them to the concert. Techrat tries to disrupt the concert with a jamming device, but Danny catches him in the act. Meanwhile, the Misfits win for Best Musical Group and Pizzazz plans to gloat to Jem about the win, so they drive to the concert, only to find the audience cheering the performance. Pizzazz, silenced and shocked by the overwhelming sense of goodwill the concert has created, doesn't notice her award accidentally slipping out of her hand to the floor, where it smashes into a hundred pieces, and causes the episode to end abruptly. Featured songs: "You Oughta See the View From Here" – The Misfits, "Runnin' Like the Wind" – Jem and The Holograms, "Friend or Stranger" – Jem and The Holograms Note: When this episode first aired, the show provided a hotline for runaway kids to call and get help. Due to the high call volume, the system went down temporarily. It is also the first and only time where the Misfits beat Jem and the Holograms fair and square.
15	15	"The Rock Fashion Book"	Rick Merwin	September 27, 1986	5205-15
Jem and the Holograms are approached by Robert Arlington, a high profile publisher, who offers them an opportunity to appear in a rock music themed fashion book. The Misfits learn of this and try to upstage the Holograms' book by creating their own. When their initial attempts fail, they attempt to ruin the book outright, but with no success. Eventually, Pizzazz persuades her father to buy the rights to the book, putting the Misfits in charge of the project. Featured songs: "Come On In, the Water's Fine" – Jem and The Holograms, "We're Off and Runnin'" – The Misfits, "We Can Change It" – Jem and The Holograms
16	16	"Broadway Magic"	Marv Wolfman	October 4, 1986	5205-16
Eric incites greed and scandal by offering a $100,000 reward for anyone who can reveal Jem's real identity, while both groups are in New York City auditioning for the lead roles in a Broadway producer's new show. Rio decided that he doesn't have to know Jem's real name. Note: D'Compose from Inhumanoids makes a cameo in one of television sets at an electronics store when Eric Raymond did a televised press conference. Featured songs: "Who Is She, Anyway?" – The Misfits, "Can't Get My Love Together" – Jem and The Holograms, "Broadway Magic" – Jem and The Holograms
17	17	"In Search of the Stolen Album"	Rick Merwin	October 11, 1986	5205-17
As Jem and the Holograms prepare to release their debut album, Eric (who was banished from Misfits Music by Harvey Gabor) hires Zipper to steal it, so The Misfits can use the material for themselves. Pizzazz sends the Holograms anonymous letters with clues that will supposedly lead them to the stolen album, but lead them into danger instead. In the end, the Holograms retrieve the missing album and in the process, they find the Misfits' album which they replace with a recording of French lessons. Featured songs: "There's a Melody Playin'" – Jem and The Holograms, "There Ain't Nobody Better" – The Misfits Note: Both songs use the same backing track.
18	18	"Hot Time in Hawaii"	Beth Bornstein	October 18, 1986	5205-18
Jem, The Holograms and The Misfits are all invited to compete in the "Battle of the Music Stars", a Battle of the Network Stars type event in Honolulu. Eric's hired thug, Zipper supplies the Misfits with rigged sports equipment to give them the edge in the competition. Later on, Kimber is kidnapped, and the Holograms have to find her in time to compete. Note: This episode marks the final appearance of Zipper. Featured Songs: "We're the Misfits in Hawaii" – The Misfits, "How You Play the Game" – Jem and The Holograms
19	19	"The Princess and the Singer"	Christy Marx & Ellen Guon	November 1, 1986	5205-19
Loosely based on the Mark Twain story The Prince and the Pauper; while touring the small European country of Morvania, Kimber meets Princess Adriana, the teenage heir to the throne who happens to look exactly like her. When Adriana escapes from her room, her power-hungry cousin Lexa hires her henchmen to track her down and bring her back. When Kimber and Adriana bump into each other, Lexa's henchmen discover Kimber (Who they think is Adriana) then kidnap her and lock her in a tower where she escapes. Lexa discovers that the real Adriana is with the Holograms so she uses the Misfits to lure Kimber to the hotel where the Holograms are staying and plant a bomb on the stage (to kill Adriana) and take over the throne. Eric Raymond and The Misfits gatecrash the party and save Jem, the Holograms and Adriana from the bomb on the stage. The Holograms then rescue Kimber, Lexa is placed under arrest for conspiracy, and Adriana claims the title of crowned queen at last. Featured songs: "Here Comes Trouble" – Jem and The Holograms, "The Queen of Rock and Roll" – The Misfits Bonus song: "Universal Appeal" – The Misfits
20	20	"Island of Deception"	Mary Skrenes	November 8, 1986	5205-20
Jem and The Holograms are invited to perform at a concert in St. Thomas and travel aboard a luxury ocean liner to get there. Eric and the Misfits, who are convinced there's a publicity stunt going on, tag along to cash in on it. Later that evening, after giving a performance for the passengers and crew of the ship, Jem and the Holograms are tricked by the Misfits into hiding aboard a lifeboat under the misconception of giving the ship's captain a surprise for his birthday. When the prank goes wrong, it strands both the Holograms and the Misfits on a tropical island. The girls, despite their rivalry must try to survive and then get help from a hermit named Angus, who is living on the island. Featured songs: "Set Your Sails" – Jem and The Holograms, "It Takes Alot to Survive" – The Misfits Note: "Set Your Sails" uses the same backing track as "Love's Not Easy", which later appeared in "Renaissance Woman".
21	21	"Old Meets New"	Sandy Fries	November 15, 1986	5205-21
When Jem & The Holograms perform a cover of a song called 'Rock and Roll is Forever' at an outdoor concert, they infuriate an elderly singer named Bobby Bailey, who turns out to be the lead singer of a 1950s rock and roll band called Bobby Bailey and the Tornadoes. However, Bobby turns out to be a man with a big heart but also a big problem. His flat is scheduled for demolition and Eric Raymond is behind it. Will Jem & The Holograms manage to help Bobby or will the wrecking ball win the day? Featured songs: "Rock and Roll Is Forever" – Jem and The Holograms, "Jack, Take a Hike" – The Misfits, "Let's Not Forget the Past" – Jem and The Holograms/Bobby Bailey
22	22	"Intrigue at the Indy 500"	Roger Slifer	February 1, 1987	5205-22
Starlight Music sponsors Indy 500 driver Martino Granzetti. When a crash lands Martino (and Rio) in the hospital, Jem & the Holograms manage to rebuild the car and Jem decides to race the car for the tournament. However, things turn nasty when Pizzazz enters the race and causes chaos on the track. Despite having a damaged car, Jem becomes determined to beat Pizzazz. Featured songs: "I'm Coming From Behind" – Jem and The Holograms, "Back in Shape" – Jem and The Holograms, "Ahead of the Game" – The Misfits
23	23	"The Jem Jam: Part 1"	Christy Marx	February 8, 1987	5205-23
The Misfits plot to ruin The Jem Jam, a benefit concert Jem is planning, by hiring a group of thugs to gatecrash the party and trash the place to make Jem look bad. At Starlight Mansion, Krissie must deal with Lena Lerner's (a Tina Turner-like pop star) spoiled brat son, Dominic (who resembles a young Michael Jackson), and Ba Nee is sure that Randy James, a red-haired drummer for a is her father. This episode also featured other "celebrity" stars, Roland Owens (who resembles Stevie Wonder), Ron Cox (resembles Mick Jagger), and Johnny Deacon (resembles Bruce Springsteen). The Misfits trick Jem's final guest Luna Dark (who resembles Madonna) into coming with them. Jem sneaks into Pizzazz's mansion to rescue Luna, but she is attacked by Pizzazz's guard dogs. Featured songs: "I Can See Me" – Ashley, "A Father Should Be" – Ba Nee Note: This is one of the two episodes not to feature any songs by Jem and the Holograms.
24	24	"The Jem Jam: Part 2"	Christy Marx	February 15, 1987	5205-24
With help from Synergy, Jem manages to fend off Pizzazz's guard dogs and rescues Luna. When the Misfits decide to investigate the intruder, they are attacked by the dogs who lock themselves in the dogs' kennel as Harvey (who is away on a business trip) is the only one who can control them. The Misfits plot to ruin the Jem Jam, with help from Techrat. Meanwhile, Ba Nee goes to great lengths to prove that Randy is her father. Also, Krissy finds out that there's more to Dominic than she thought. Featured songs: "You May Be a Star" – Krissie, "Gimme a Gimmick" – The Misfits, "Jam All Night Long" – Jem and The Holograms/Luna Dark/Johnny Deacon/Lena Lerner/Ron Cox/Roland Owens
25	25	"Culture Clash"	David Wise	February 22, 1987	5205-25
An eccentric artist, Fitzgerald Beck, is the art director for Jem and the Holograms' new video. Fitz's art dealer is using his sculptures to smuggle stolen diamonds. The Misfits find this out and set up the sculptures to explode onstage while Jem and the Holograms are filming the video, leading the police to believe it was Jem and the Holograms and Beck who put the diamonds there. Jem and the Holograms must team up with Fitz to find the actual culprit before the cops catch them. Featured songs: "Surprise! Surprise!" – The Misfits, "I Believe In Happy Endings" – Jem and The Holograms
26	26	"Glitter and Gold"	Christy Marx	March 15, 1987	5205-26
Jem hasn't been heard from in some time and Jerrica doesn't seem to care. The Misfits waste no time capitalizing on her absence, especially when Owen Beech, the owner of Diskovery Records promotes a contest, awarding a Gold Album award and a new car, the Glitter and Gold Roadster to the winner. After an argument with Rio, the Holograms try to persuade Jerrica to make a new album to compete with the Misfits. Jerrica is somewhat resistant to the idea, feeling it may be too late to enter the contest, but when she overhears Eric making a comment that she ruined Jem's career, it galvanizes her to enter, and promises Owen Beech she and the Holograms will deliver a new album in time for the contest. The group decides to use the prizes for the contest as the theme for their new album and look called "Glitter and Gold". Eric tries various methods of helping the Misfits win by bribing a group called the Skulls to sabotage all of the Jem records where Rio chases them off and then bribes customers at Diskovery Records into buying the Misfits' records. The contest goes underway with both Jem and the Misfits each selling hundreds of records. Rio buys the final Jem record to help Jem win but he is disqualified when Pizzazz and Eric point out to Owen that Rio works for Jem. Another customer buys a Misfits record which makes the Misfits think that they've won but the customer also buys a Jem record. With both groups each selling 500,000 records, Owen decides to extend the contest by one more purchase. A customer who is torn between buying a Misfits record and a Jem record is bribed by Clash into buying a Misfits record but Ashley swipes the money from Clash and then the customer decides to buy the final Jem record making Jem and the Holograms win the contest. Featured songs: "How Does It Feel?" – The Misfits, "Glitter and Gold" – Jem and The Holograms, "We're Up/You're Down" – Jem and The Holograms/The Misfits
