= The Beginnings =

1917 poem by Rudyard Kipling

"The Beginnings" in A Diversity of Creatures

"The Beginnings" is a 1917 poem by the English writer Rudyard Kipling. The poem is about how the English people, although naturally peaceful, slowly become filled with a hate which will lead to the advent of a new epoch.

The first four stanzas have four lines each with alternate rhymes, while the fifth (and final) stanza has five lines. The last line of every stanza ends with "... the English began to hate". The context is the anti-German sentiment in Britain during the First World War. Kipling was known for never portraying Germans in a positive light, and had been the first to use the word "Hun" as a slur for Germans. The poem was written following the death of his son in that war.

The poem first appeared in Kipling's 1917 collection A Diversity of Creatures, where it accompanies the short story "Mary Postgate". The story had originally been published in 1915, but without the poem.
