= Forefather (band) =

English folk metal band

- Origin: Surrey, England
- Genres: Black metal, folk metal
- Years active: 1997–present
- Labels: Angelisc Enterprises; Karmageddon Media; Seven Kingdoms; Eisenwald Tonschmiede
- Members: Athelstan; Wulfstan
- Website: forefather.net

Forefather are an English folk metal band from Surrey. They incorporate Viking metal and black metal. The band have released seven studio albums since 1997.

== History ==
Forefather was formed in September 1997 by brothers Wulfstan and Athelstan. Two years later, Forefather released their first album, Deep Into Time, on the band's own label, Angelisc Enterprises, on which two more albums were released by the band, The Fighting Man and Engla Tocyme, in 2000 and 2002, respectively. Forefather's fourth album, Ours Is the Kingdom, was released in 2004 by Karmageddon Media, on which the band's entire back catalogue was re-released, remastered and with bonus tracks. In 2008, Forefather released their fifth album, Steadfast, on the band's new own label, Seven Kingdoms, on which three years later the band's sixth album, Last of the Line, would be released. In April 2015, the band released a new album, Curse of the Cwelled, on St George's Day, on Seven Kingdoms. In 2017, they released their latest album, Tales from a Cloud-Born Land.

== Current line-up ==
- Athelstan – guitars, bass, keyboards
- Wulfstan – guitars, bass, vocals

Athelstan and Wulfstan are former members of folk metal project Folkearth.

== Discography ==
=== Studio albums ===
- Deep Into Time (1999)
- The Fighting Man (2000)
- Engla Tocyme (2002)
- Ours Is the Kingdom (2004)
- Steadfast (2008)
- Last of the Line (2011)
- Curse of the Cwelled (2015)
- Tales From a Cloud-Born Land (2017)

=== Compilations ===
- Legends Untold (2000)

=== Singles ===
- Summer's Flame (2009)
