= Beginner =

Beginner may refer to:

- Beginners (short story collection), title given to the manuscript version of Raymond Carver's 1981 short story collection What We Talk About When We Talk About Love
- Beginners, a 2010 drama film written and directed by Mike Mills
- Beginner (band), a German rap group
- "Beginner" (AKB48 song), a 2010 song by Japanese idol girl group AKB48
- "Beginner" (Joker Xue song), a 2016 single by Joker Xue
- Beginner (album), a 2016 album by Joker Xue
- "Beginners" (Frank Stubbs Promotes), a 1993 television episode

== See also ==
- Help:Introduction, if you want to learn to edit Wikipedia.
