= The Playlist =

British children's entertainment and music series

- Genre: Entertainment; Music
- Directed by: Steve Wynne
- Presented by: Guest presenters
- Starring: Lauren Layfield; Lewys Ball; Rio Fredrika; Donel Mangena; Dev Griffin; Jordan North; MistaJam; Greg James
- Country of origin: United Kingdom
- Original language: English
- No. of seasons: 5
- No. of episodes: 219

Production
- Executive producers: Hugh Lawton; Steve Wynne
- Producer: Hannah Smith
- Running time: 15–20 minutes
- Production company: Strawberry Blond TV

Original release
- Network: CBBC
- Release: 22 April 2017 – 12 March 2022

The Playlist is a British children's entertainment and music series presented by guest presenters, produced by Strawberry Blond TV for CBBC and first aired on 22 April 2017 and ended on 12 March 2022. The first series was narrated by Scott Mills. Each week the show has a different presenter with Greg James, Dev Griffin, MistaJam or Jordan North presenting the UK Singles Chart Top 10 segment and features various co-presenters since its 16th episode. The first presenters were Pixie Lott and Anton Powers. It is a replacement for the CBBC Official Chart Show, which ended in February 2017.

== Format ==
Each week, on the CBBC website, there are ten different songs, and the user has three votes. They can be used all on one song, or they can vote for two or three songs. In the weeks leading up to more recent episodes, users only have one vote, therefore making it harder to choose. The three songs with the most votes are played on The Playlist. The user can also comment on songs and why they voted for them, either by uploading a short video, uploading a selfie or by leaving a comment on the CBBC website. The comments, as well as facts about the artist/artists, are displayed whilst a song is being played. Each week, BBC Radio 1 DJ Greg James, Dev Griffin or Jordan North also presents the UK Singles Chart Top 10, whilst playing short extracts from each song. In between these main segments, there are also games, and chats with the hosts.

Since series 2, the celebrity host chooses their three tracks.

== Production ==
After the CBBC Official Chart Show ended in February 2017 after almost two years and 69 episodes, it was announced that the executive producer of the CBBC Official Chart Show was setting up his own independent production company, Strawberry Blond TV and CBBC was expected to return to the live music genre.

According to Broadcast magazine, The Playlist was to be incorporated into CBBC's new live Saturday morning TV series Saturday Mash-Up!, which was to begin in September 2017.

Following the end of The Playlist in March 2022, Strawberry Blond TV was commissioned to make a similar weekly pop-culture series for CBBC and BBC iPlayer, Love! Love! Love!, which was hosted by Shereen Cutkelvin.

== Presenters ==
=== Series 1 (April 2017–March 2018) ===
22 April 2017	29 April	6 May	13 May	20 May	27 May	3 June	10 June	17 June
Pixie Lott and Anton Powers	The Vamps	Reggie 'n' Bollie	The Tide	Becky Hill	Aston Merrygold	Jonas Blue	JP Cooper	5 After Midnight^{1}
24 June	1 July	8 July	15 July	22 July	9 September	16 September	23 September	30 September
Perri Kiely & Ashley Banjo	The Amazons	Raye	Calum Scott	Matt Edmondson	Callum Beattie	Charli XCX^{2}	Jamie Lawson^{2}	Anne-Marie^{3}
7 October	14 October	21 October	28 October	4 November	11 November	18 November	25 November	2 December
Ella Eyre^{4}	Lucy and Lydia Connell ^{3}	Craig David^{4}	Max and Harvey^{3}	Sophia Grace^{2}	Josh Pieters^{3}	Jonas Blue^{4}	Pixie Lott^{4}	DanTDM^{4}
9 December	16 December	23 December	6 January 2018	13 January	20 January	27 January	3 February	10 February
Sigma^{4}	The Cutkelvins^{2}	The Vamps^{4}	Best of 2017^{4}	Raye^{4}	Stylo G^{4}	Matt Terry^{4}	M.O^{4}	Sigrid^{2}
17 February	24 February	3 March	10 March	17 March				
Reggie 'n' Bollie^{4}	Nina Nesbitt^{4}	Lewys Ball^{4}	Samantha Harvey^{2}	Calum Scott^{4}				

=== Series 2 (May 2018–March 2019) ===
5 May	12 May	19 May	26 May	2 June	9 June	16 June	23 June	30 June	7 July
Yxng Bane^{4}	Jaymi Hensley^{5}	Yes Lad^{5}	SuRie^{4}	Jonas Blue^{5}	Evie Clarke^{5}	HRVY^{4}	Why Don't We^{6}	Bars and Melody^{4}	Olivia Grace^{5}
14 July	21 July	28 July	4 August	11 August	18 August	25 August	1 September	8 September	15 September
Stefflon Don^{5}	Danny Jones^{6}	Sophia Grace^{5}	The Vamps^{4}	Tom Odell^{6}	Sigala & Fuse ODG^{5}	Donel Mangena^{5}	Raye^{4}	Lucy and Lydia Connell^{5}	Louisa Johnson & One Bit^{4}
22 September	29 September	6 October	13 October	20 October	27 October	3 November	10 November	17 November	24 November
Georgia "Toff" Toffolo^{5}	Mark Ferris^{4}	Rak-Su^{5}	Mabel^{5}	Olly Murs^{6}	You Me At Six^{4}	Conor Maynard^{6}	Alessia Cara^{6}	Max and Harvey^{4}	Sabrina Carpenter^{5}
1 December	8 December	15 December	22 December	12 January 2019	19 January	26 January	2 February	9 February	16 February
Misunderstood ^{6}	Yxng Bane^{4}	Dan and Phil^{4}	Christmas special^{7}	Best of 2018^{5}	Oti Mabuse^{4}	Acacia & Aaliyah^{6}	Fleur East^{5}	Saara Aalto^{4}	New Hope Club^{6}
23 February	2 March	9 March	16 March	23 March	30 March				
Mabel^{5}	Tom Walker^{5}	Sophia and Cinzia^{5}	Grace Carter^{6}	The Wonderland^{4}	Gabrielle Aplin^{4}				

=== Series 3 (April 2019–March 2020) ===
6 April	13 April	20 April	27 April	4 May	11 May	18 May	25 May	1 June	8 June										
Anna Maynard^{5}	Donel Mangena^{6}	Rak-Su^{6}	Aisha hussein^{5}	Olivia Grace^{6}	Michael Rice^{6}	Four of Diamonds^{5}	James Morrison^{5}	Lewis Maxwell^{6}	Andreya Triana^{6}	15 June	22 June	29 June	6 July	13 July	20 July	27 July	3 August	10 August	17 August
Danny Jones^{6}	Tinchy Stryder^{5}	100th Playlist^{7}	Freya Ridings^{6}	Adam Lambert^{4}	Stefflon Don^{5}	New Hope Club^{5}	Lauv^{5}	Summertime Playlist^{4}	NXTGEN^{6}										
24 August	31 August	7 September	14 September	21 September	28 September	5 October	12 October	19 October	26 October										
Jay McGuiness^{4}	Raye^{5}	Drax Project^{5}	Tallia Storm^{6}	Max and Harvey^{4}	Joel Corry^{4}	Mark Ferris^{4}	Denis Coleman^{5}	Arielle Free^{5}	The Next Step cast^{6}										
2 November	9 November	16 November	23 November	30 November	7 December	14 December	21 December	28 December	4 January 2020										
Cher Lloyd^{6}	Kara Marni^{6}	Rak-Su^{5}	Dodie Clark^{5}	Kevin McHale^{6}	The Wonderland^{6}	Olivia Grace^{5}	Christmas #1 Playlist^{7}	The Playlist Awards^{5}	Playlist of the 2010s^{4}										
11 January	18 January	25 January	1 February	8 February	15 February	22 February	29 February	7 March	14 March										
Bars and Melody^{4}	Twist and Pulse^{4}	Hamzaa^{6}	Lauv^{5}	Radzi Chinyanganya and Jess Hatfield^{8}	Sam Bird^{6}	New Hope Club^{5}	Tom Grennan^{6}	Louisa Johnson^{4}	Joel Corry^{4}										
21 March	28 March																		
Andy & the Band^{5}	Melanie C^{6}																		

=== Series 4 (April 2020–March 2021) ===
4 April	11 April	18 April	25 April	2 May	9 May	16 May	23 May	30 May	6 June
Four of Diamonds^{5}	Lauren Layfield	Justin Bieber special^{5}	Donel Mangena	Ariana Grande special^{4}	Cher Lloyd^{5}	James Newman and Myles Stephenson^{5}	KSI ^{4}	Amanda Holden, Becky Hill and Tom Grennan^{4}	Ed Sheeran special^{6}
13 June	20 June	27 June	4 July	11 July	18 July	25 July	1 August	8 August	15 August
Max and Harvey^{7}	HRVY^{4}	AJ and Curtis Pritchard^{5}	Melanie C^{4}	Joel Corry^{5}	Callum Beattie, Grace Davies and Loren Gray^{5}	Arlo Parks and Four of Diamonds^{5}	Paige Turley and Kara Marni ^{4}	Becky Hill, Daði Freyr and New Hope Club^{8}	Una Healy^{4}
22 August	29 August	5 September	12 September	19 September	26 September	3 October	10 October	17 October	24 October
Zara Larsson^{4}	Ray Quinn and Holly H ^{5}	Aloe Blacc and Izzy Bizu ^{4}	Nathan Dawe and Nadia Rose^{8}	S-X^{4}	Moonchild Sanelly^{4}	Ben Miller and Foxes^{5}	Stevie Knows and Zoe Wees^{5}	Amy MacDonald, Nikki Lilly and Tate McRae^{5}	Tom Grennan and Reggie 'n' Bollie^{4}
31 October	7 November	14 November	21 November	28 November	5 December	12 December	19 December	9 January 2021	16 January
Ultimate Halloween Playlist^{7}	Not3s & Dodie Clark^{5}	Katie Melua & Andy Day^{5}	Ranj Singh & David Baddiel^{4}	Alexander 23^{5}	Matt Lucas, Shaggy & Yungblud^{4}	Becky Hill^{5}	At Ho-Ho-Home with The Playlist^{7}	2020 Playlist Rewind^{8}	Kidz Bop^{4}
23 January	30 January	6 February	13 February	20 February	27 February	6 March	13 March	20 March	27 March
Raye & Benny Blanco^{4}	Arlo Parks^{5}	Sonny Jay, Oti Mabuse & Mae Muller^{8}	Vick Hope, Nathan Evans & YolanDa Brown^{4}	Joe Sugg & Dianne Buswell^{5}	Kara Marni, Karen Harding & Boy Pablo^{4}	Gabrielle, Megan McKenna & Una Healy^{5}	Mufasa & Hypeman^{4}	Sam Fischer, Tom Grennan & Dodie Clark^{5}	Aloe Blacc & Tallia Storm^{5}

=== Series 5 (April 2021-March 2022) ===
17 April	24 April	1 May	8 May	15 May	22 May	29 May	5 June	12 June	19 June	11 September
Veronica Green, Becky Hill & Ward Thomas^{4}	Maisie Peters, Jodie Harsh & Tom Gregory^{5}	Griff, Matt Lucas & RAE^{4}	Bebe Rexha, Asha Gold & Delta Goodrem^{5}	Karim Zeroual, Jade Bird, Ashley Banjo & Jordan Banjo^{8}	Eurovision Song Contest special^{4}	Max and Harvey, Here At Last & Donel Mangena^{5}	Conor Maynard, Tom Zanetti & Lola Lennox^{8}	Shayne Ward, Gracey & Zoe Wees^{4}	We Three, Blessing Chitapa & Skylar^{4}	200th Playlist^{7}
18 September	25 September	2 October	9 October	16 October	23 October	30 October	6 November	13 November	8 January 2022	15 January
Maisie Peters and Ruby Jay^{5}	Mabel, Natalie Imbruglia and Tallia Storm^{5}	Ben Miller, Kara Marni & Jack Fowler^{4}	David Baddiel, Kimberly Wyatt & L Devine^{4}	James Arthur, Olivia and Flossie & Tony Perry^{5}	Maddie Moate and Rickie Haywood-Williams^{8}	Halloween Special ^{7}	Lauren Child, Max and Harvey & Alfie Templeman^{8}	Karen Hauer, Gorka Márquez, Tilly Lockey & the Van Tulleken brothers^{4}	Best of 2021^{5}	Mae Muller, Jonasu & Matthew Murphy^{5}
22 January	29 January	5 February	12 February	19 February	26 February	5 March	12 March			
Joel Corry & Grace Davies^{8}	Emma Maggie Davies, We Three & Here At Last^{4}	Graziano Di Prima, Arielle Free & Prins^{6}	Dean McCullough, CMAT & Talullah Conabeare^{5}	James Morrison, Anastacia & Barney Walsh^{5}	Lost Frequencies, Rosie Jones & Yola^{4}	Hanson, Ellie-May Sheridan and Allegra^{4}	The Final Playlist^{7}			

Notes

1. 5 After Midnight member Kieran Alleyne was unable to present this episode, due to tonsillitis.
2. These episodes were co-presented by Yasser Ranjah.
3. These episodes were co-presented by Jack Maynard.
4. These episodes were co-presented by Lauren Layfield.
5. These episodes were co-presented by Lewys Ball.
6. These episodes were co-presented by Rio Fredrika.
7. These episodes were co-presented by all presenters.
8. These episodes were co-presented by Donel Mangena.

== Playlist choices ==
=== Series 1 ===
#	Episode	3rd	2nd	1st
1	22 April 2017	Anne-Marie – "Ciao Adios"	Clean Bandit featuring Zara Larsson – "Symphony"	Ed Sheeran – "Galway Girl"
2	29 April 2017	Martin Jensen – "Solo Dance"	Anne-Marie – "Ciao Adios"	Ed Sheeran – "Shape of You"
3	6 May 2017	One Direction – "Drag Me Down"	Little Mix – "Shout Out to My Ex"	Zara Larsson – "Lush Life"
4	13 May 2017	Katy Perry featuring Skip Marley – "Chained to the Rhythm"	Martin Jensen – "Solo Dance"	Clean Bandit featuring Zara Larsson – "Symphony"
5	20 May 2017	Bruno Mars – "That's What I Like"	Ed Sheeran – "Castle on the Hill"	Anne Marie – "Ciao Adios"
6	27 May 2017	Katy Perry ft. Skip Marley – "Chained to the Rhythm"	Martin Jensen – "Solo Dance"	Ed Sheeran – "Galway Girl"
7	3 June 2017	Major Lazer ft. Justin Bieber & MØ – "Cold Water"	Olly Murs ft. Demi Lovato – "Up"	Little Mix ft. Jason Derulo – "Secret Love Song"
8	10 June 2017	Charlie Puth – "Attention"	DJ Khaled featuring Justin Bieber, Quavo, Chance the Rapper and Lil Wayne – "I'm the One"	Luis Fonsi featuring Daddy Yankee – "Despacito"
9	17 June 2017	Jonas Blue featuring William Singe – "Mama"	Luis Fonsi ft. Daddy Yankee – "Despacito"	Little Mix – "Wings"
10	24 June 2017	Justin Timberlake – "Can't Stop the Feeling!"	Zara Larsson – "Lush Life"	Martin Jensen – "Solo Dance"
11	1 July 2017	Jonas Blue featuring William Singe – "Mama"	Luis Fonsi ft. Daddy Yankee – "Despacito"	Little Mix featuring Stormzy – "Power"
12	8 July 2017	Niall Horan – "Slow Hands"	Ariana Grande featuring Zedd – "Break Free"	Little Mix featuring Stormzy – "Power"
13	15 July 2017	Selena Gomez – "Bad Liar"	Olly Murs featuring Louisa Johnson – "Unpredictable"	Rita Ora – "Your Song"
14	22 July 2017	Calvin Harris featuring Pharrell Williams, Katy Perry and Big Sean – "Feels"	Luis Fonsi featuring Daddy Yankee – "Despacito"	Little Mix ft. Stormzy – "Power"
15	9 September 2017	Jonas Blue featuring William Singe – "Mama"	Luis Fonsi featuring Daddy Yankee – "Despacito"	Little Mix ft. Stormzy – "Power"
16	16 September 2017	Pink – "What About Us"	CNCO & Little Mix – "Reggaetón Lento (remix)"	Jax Jones featuring Demi Lovato and Stefflon Don - "Instruction"
17	23 September 2017	Charli XCX – "Boys"	CNCO & Little Mix – "Reggaetón Lento (remix)"	Ed Sheeran – "Shape of You"
18	30 September 2017	One Direction – "Best Song Ever"	Ed Sheeran – "Thinking Out Loud"	Taylor Swift – "Shake It Off"
19	7 October 2017	Charli XCX – "Boys"	Pink – "What About Us"	Jax Jones featuring Demi Lovato and Stefflon Don - "Instruction"
20	14 October 2017	Avicii featuring Rita Ora – "Lonely Together"	Taylor Swift – "Look What You Made Me Do"	CNCO & Little Mix – "Reggaetón Lento (remix)"
21	21 October 2017	Ed Sheeran – "Castle on the Hill"	Major Lazer ft. Justin Bieber and MØ – "Cold Water"	Pink – "What About Us"
22	28 October 2017	Ella Henderson – "Ghost"	Fifth Harmony – "I'm in Love with a Monster"	Little Mix – "Black Magic"
23	4 November 2017	Charlie Puth – "How Long"	Avicii featuring Rita Ora – "Lonely Together"	Taylor Swift – "Look What You Made Me Do"
24	11 November 2017	Avicii featuring Rita Ora – "Lonely Together"	Zayn featuring Sia – "Dusk Till Dawn"	Ed Sheeran – "Perfect"
25	18 November 2017	The Vamps featuring Maggie Lindemann – "Personal"	Sam Smith – "Too Good at Goodbyes"	Camila Cabello featuring Young Thug – "Havana"
26	25 November 2017	Zayn featuring Sia – "Dusk Till Dawn"	Ed Sheeran – "Perfect"	Camila Cabello featuring Young Thug – "Havana"
27	2 December 2017	Rita Ora – "Anywhere"	Charlie Puth – "How Long"	Fifth Harmony – "All I Want for Christmas Is You"
28	9 December 2017	Zayn ft. Sia – "Dusk Till Dawn"	Ed Sheeran – "Perfect"	The Vamps – "I Wish It Could Be Christmas Everyday"
29	16 December 2017	Louisa Johnson – "So Good"	Olly Murs featuring Flo Rida – "Troublemaker"	Little Mix – "Shout Out to My Ex"
30	23 December 2017	Little Mix – "Christmas (Baby Please Come Home)"	Wham! – "Last Christmas"	Ariana Grande – "Santa Tell Me"
31	6 January 2018	No Playlist vote		
32	13 January 2018	Ed Sheeran – "Shape of You"	Little Mix ft. Stormzy – "Power"	Camila Cabello ft. Young Thug – "Havana"
33	20 January 2018	The Vamps ft. Maggie Lindemann – "Personal"	Rita Ora – "Anywhere"	Ed Sheeran – "Perfect"
34	27 January 2018	Sigrid – "Strangers"	Taylor Swift featuring Ed Sheeran & Future – "End Game"	Camila Cabello ft. Young Thug – "Havana"
35	3 February 2018	HRVY – "Personal"	Clean Bandit featuring Julia Michaels – "I Miss You"	Taylor Swift featuring Ed Sheeran and Future – "End Game"
36	10 February 2018	Ed Sheeran – "Perfect"	Shawn Mendes – "There's Nothing Holdin' Me Back"	Little Mix featuring Jason Derulo – "Secret Love Song"
37	17 February 2018	Bruno Mars featuring Cardi B – "Finesse (Remix)"	HRVY – "Personal"	Sigrid – "Strangers"
38	24 February 2018	Not3s and Mabel – "My Lover (Remix)"	Clean Bandit ft. Julia Michaels – "I Miss You"	Taylor Swift featuring Ed Sheeran & Future – "End Game"
39	3 March 2018	Marshmello and Anne-Marie – "Friends"	Sigrid – "Strangers"	HRVY – "Personal"
40	10 March 2018	Rudimental featuring Jess Glynne, Macklemore and Dan Caplen – "These Days"	Bruno Mars featuring Cardi B – "Finesse (Remix)"	Sigrid – "Strangers"

== Official Singles Chart No. 1s ==
=== Series 1 ===
#	Episode	Song
1	22 April 2017	Ed Sheeran – "Shape of You"
2	29 April 2017	Clean Bandit featuring Zara Larsson – "Symphony"
3	6 May 2017	DJ Khaled featuring Justin Bieber, Quavo, Chance the Rapper and Lil Wayne – "I'm the One"
4	13 May 2017	Luis Fonsi and Daddy Yankee featuring Justin Bieber – "Despacito (remix)"
5	20 May 2017	Luis Fonsi and Daddy Yankee featuring Justin Bieber – "Despacito (remix)"
6	27 May 2017	Luis Fonsi and Daddy Yankee featuring Justin Bieber – "Despacito (remix)"
7	2 June 2017	Luis Fonsi and Daddy Yankee featuring Justin Bieber – "Despacito (remix)"
8	9 June 2017	Luis Fonsi and Daddy Yankee featuring Justin Bieber – "Despacito (remix)"
9	17 June 2017	Luis Fonsi and Daddy Yankee featuring Justin Bieber – "Despacito (remix)"
10	24 June 2017	Artists for Grenfell – "Bridge over Troubled Water"
11	1 July 2017	Luis Fonsi and Daddy Yankee featuring Justin Bieber – "Despacito (remix)"
12	8 July 2017	Luis Fonsi and Daddy Yankee featuring Justin Bieber – "Despacito (remix)"
13	15 July 2017	Luis Fonsi and Daddy Yankee featuring Justin Bieber – "Despacito (remix)"
14	22 July 2017	DJ Khaled featuring Rihanna and Bryson Tiller – "Wild Thoughts"
15	9 September 2017	Taylor Swift – "Look What You Made Me Do"
16	16 September 2017	Sam Smith – "Too Good at Goodbyes"
17	23 September 2017	Sam Smith – "Too Good at Goodbyes"
18	30 September 2017	Sam Smith – "Too Good at Goodbyes"
19	7 October 2017	Post Malone ft. 21 Savage – "Rockstar"
20	14 October 2017	Post Malone ft. 21 Savage – "Rockstar"
21	21 October 2017	Post Malone ft. 21 Savage – "Rockstar"
22	28 October 2017	Post Malone ft. 21 Savage – "Rockstar"
23	4 November 2017	Camila Cabello ft. Young Thug – "Havana"
24	11 November 2017	Camila Cabello ft. Young Thug – "Havana"
25	18 November 2017	Camila Cabello ft. Young Thug – "Havana"
26	25 November 2017	Camila Cabello ft. Young Thug – "Havana"
27	2 December 2017	Camila Cabello ft. Young Thug – "Havana"
28	9 December 2017	Ed Sheeran – "Perfect"
29	16 December 2017	Ed Sheeran – "Perfect"
30	23 December 2017	Ed Sheeran – "Perfect"
31	6 January 2018	Ed Sheeran – "Perfect"
32	13 January 2018	Ed Sheeran – "Perfect"
33	20 January 2018	Eminem featuring Ed Sheeran – "River"
34	27 January 2018	Drake – "God's Plan"
35	3 February 2018	Drake – "God's Plan"
36	10 February 2018	Drake – "God's Plan"
37	17 February 2018	Drake – "God's Plan"
38	24 February 2018	Drake – "God's Plan"
39	3 March 2018	Drake – "God's Plan"
40	10 March 2018	Drake – "God's Plan"
41	17 March 2018	Drake – "God's Plan"

=== Series 2 ===
#	Episode	Song
1	5 May 2018	Calvin Harris and Dua Lipa – "One Kiss"
2	12 May 2018	Calvin Harris and Dua Lipa – "One Kiss"
3	19 May 2018	Calvin Harris and Dua Lipa – "One Kiss"
4	26 May 2018	Calvin Harris and Dua Lipa – "One Kiss"
5	2 June 2018	Calvin Harris and Dua Lipa – "One Kiss"
6	9 June 2018	Calvin Harris and Dua Lipa – "One Kiss"
7	16 June 2018	Jess Glynne – "I'll Be There"
8	23 June 2018	Clean Bandit featuring Demi Lovato – "Solo"
9	30 June 2018	George Ezra – "Shotgun"
10	7 July 2018	George Ezra – "Shotgun"
11	14 July 2018	Baddiel, Skinner and The Lightning Seeds – "Three Lions"
12	21 July 2018	Drake – "In My Feelings"
13	28 July 2018	Drake – "In My Feelings"
14	4 August 2018	Drake – "In My Feelings"
15	11 August 2018	Drake – "In My Feelings"
16	18 August 2018	George Ezra – "Shotgun"
17	25 August 2018	George Ezra – "Shotgun"
18	1 September 2018	Benny Blanco, Halsey & Khalid – "Eastside"
19	8 September 2018	Calvin Harris and Sam Smith – "Promises"
20	15 September 2018	Calvin Harris and Sam Smith – "Promises"
21	22 September 2018	Calvin Harris and Sam Smith – "Promises"
22	29 September 2018	Calvin Harris and Sam Smith – "Promises"
23	6 October 2018	Calvin Harris and Sam Smith – "Promises"
24	13 October 2018	Dave featuring Fredo – "Funky Friday"
25	20 October 2018	Calvin Harris and Sam Smith – "Promises"
26	27 October 2018	Lady Gaga and Bradley Cooper – "Shallow"
27	3 November 2018	Lady Gaga and Bradley Cooper – "Shallow"
28	10 November 2018	Ariana Grande – "thank u, next"
29	17 November 2018	Ariana Grande – "thank u, next"
30	24 November 2018	Ariana Grande – "thank u, next"
31	1 December 2018	Ariana Grande – "thank u, next"
32	8 December 2018	Ariana Grande – "thank u, next"
33	15 December 2018	Ariana Grande – "thank u, next"
34	22 December 2018	LadBaby – "We Built This City"
35	12 January 2019	Ava Max – "Sweet but Psycho"
36	19 January 2019	Ava Max – "Sweet but Psycho"
37	26 January 2019	Ariana Grande – "7 Rings"
38	2 February 2019	Ariana Grande – "7 Rings"
39	9 February 2019	Ariana Grande – "7 Rings"
40	16 February 2019	Ariana Grande – "Break Up with Your Girlfriend, I'm Bored"
41	23 February 2019	Ariana Grande – "7 Rings"
42	2 March 2019	Lewis Capaldi – "Someone You Loved"
43	9 March 2019	Lewis Capaldi – "Someone You Loved"
44	16 March 2019	Lewis Capaldi – "Someone You Loved"
45	23 March 2019	Lewis Capaldi – "Someone You Loved"
46	30 March 2019	Lewis Capaldi – "Someone You Loved"

=== Series 3 ===
#	Episode	Song
1	6 April 2019	Lewis Capaldi – "Someone You Loved"
2	13 April 2019	Lewis Capaldi – "Someone You Loved"
3	20 April 2019	Lil Nas X featuring Billy Ray Cyrus – "Old Town Road"
4	27 April 2019	Lil Nas X featuring Billy Ray Cyrus – "Old Town Road"
5	4 May 2019	Stormzy – "Vossi Bop"
6	11 May 2019	Stormzy – "Vossi Bop"
7	18 May 2019	Ed Sheeran and Justin Bieber – "I Don't Care"
8	25 May 2019	Ed Sheeran and Justin Bieber – "I Don't Care"
9	1 June 2019	Ed Sheeran and Justin Bieber – "I Don't Care"
10	8 June 2019	Ed Sheeran and Justin Bieber – "I Don't Care"
11	15 June 2019	Ed Sheeran and Justin Bieber – "I Don't Care"
12	22 June 2019	Ed Sheeran and Justin Bieber – "I Don't Care"
13	29 June 2019	Ed Sheeran and Justin Bieber – "I Don't Care"
14	6 July 2019	Ed Sheeran and Justin Bieber – "I Don't Care"
15	13 July 2019	Shawn Mendes and Camila Cabello – "Señorita"
16	20 July 2019	Ed Sheeran featuring Khalid – "Beautiful People"
17	27 July 2019	Shawn Mendes & Camila Cabello – "Señorita"
18	3 August 2019	Shawn Mendes & Camila Cabello – "Señorita"
19	10 August 2019	Shawn Mendes & Camila Cabello – "Señorita"
20	17 August 2019	Shawn Mendes & Camila Cabello – "Señorita"
21	24 August 2019	Shawn Mendes & Camila Cabello – "Señorita"
22	31 August 2019	Ed Sheeran ft. Stormzy – "Take Me Back to London"
23	7 September 2019	Ed Sheeran ft. Stormzy – "Take Me Back to London"
24	14 September 2019	Ed Sheeran ft. Stormzy – "Take Me Back to London"
25	21 September 2019	Ed Sheeran ft. Stormzy – "Take Me Back to London"
26	28 September 2019	Ed Sheeran ft. Stormzy – "Take Me Back to London"
27	5 October 2019	Tones and I – "Dance Monkey"
28	12 October 2019	Tones and I – "Dance Monkey"
29	19 October 2019	Tones and I – "Dance Monkey"
30	26 October 2019	Tones and I – "Dance Monkey"
31	2 November 2019	Tones and I – "Dance Monkey"
32	9 November 2019	Tones and I – "Dance Monkey"
33	16 November 2019	Tones and I – "Dance Monkey"
34	23 November 2019	Tones and I – "Dance Monkey"
35	30 November 2019	Tones and I – "Dance Monkey"
36	7 December 2019	Tones and I – "Dance Monkey"
37	14 December 2019	Tones and I – "Dance Monkey"
38	21 December 2019	LadBaby – "I Love Sausage Rolls"
39	28 December 2019	Ellie Goulding – "River"
40	4 January 2020	Stormzy featuring Ed Sheeran & Burna Boy – "Own It"
41	11 January 2020	Stormzy featuring Ed Sheeran & Burna Boy – "Own It"
42	18 January 2020	Stormzy featuring Ed Sheeran & Burna Boy – "Own It"
43	25 January 2020	Eminem featuring Juice Wrld – "Godzilla"
44	1 February 2020	Lewis Capaldi – "Before You Go"
45	8 February 2020	The Weeknd – "Blinding Lights"
46	15 February 2020	The Weeknd – "Blinding Lights"
47	22 February 2020	Billie Eilish – "No Time to Die"
48	29 February 2020	The Weeknd – "Blinding Lights"
49	7 March 2020	The Weeknd – "Blinding Lights"
50	14 March 2020	The Weeknd – "Blinding Lights"
51	21 March 2020	Saint Jhn – "Roses"
52	28 March 2020	Saint Jhn – "Roses"

=== Series 4 ===
#	Episode	Song
1	4 April 2020	The Weeknd – "Blinding Lights"
2	11 April 2020	The Weeknd – "Blinding Lights"
3	18 April 2020	The Weeknd – "Blinding Lights"
4	25 April 2020	Michael Ball, Captain Tom Moore & The NHS Voices of Care Choir - "You'll Never Walk Alone"
5	2 May 2020	Live Lounge Allstars - "Times Like These" (BBC Radio 1 Stay Home)^{1}
6	9 May 2020	Drake – "Toosie Slide"
7	16 May 2020	DaBaby featuring Roddy Ricch – "Rockstar"
8	23 May 2020	DaBaby featuring Roddy Ricch – "Rockstar"
9	30 May 2020	Lady Gaga and Ariana Grande – "Rain on Me"
10	6 June 2020	DaBaby featuring Roddy Ricch – "Rockstar"
11	13 June 2020	DaBaby featuring Roddy Ricch – "Rockstar"
12	20 June 2020	DaBaby featuring Roddy Ricch – "Rockstar"
13	27 June 2020	DaBaby featuring Roddy Ricch – "Rockstar"
14	4 July 2020	Jawsh 685 & Jason Derulo – "Savage Love (Laxed – Siren Beat)"
15	11 July 2020	Jawsh 685 & Jason Derulo – "Savage Love (Laxed – Siren Beat)"
16	18 July 2020	Jawsh 685 & Jason Derulo – "Savage Love (Laxed – Siren Beat)"
17	25 July 2020	Joel Corry featuring MNEK – "Head & Heart"
18	1 August 2020	Joel Corry featuring MNEK – "Head & Heart"
19	8 August 2020	Joel Corry featuring MNEK – "Head & Heart"
20	15 August 2020	Joel Corry featuring MNEK – "Head & Heart"
21	22 August 2020	Joel Corry featuring MNEK – "Head & Heart"
22	29 August 2020	Joel Corry featuring MNEK – "Head & Heart"
23	5 September 2020	Cardi B featuring Megan Thee Stallion – "WAP"
24	12 September 2020	Cardi B featuring Megan Thee Stallion – "WAP"
25	19 September 2020	Cardi B featuring Megan Thee Stallion – "WAP"
26	26 September 2020	24kGoldn featuring Iann Dior – "Mood"
27	3 October 2020	24kGoldn featuring Iann Dior – "Mood"
28	10 October 2020	24kGoldn featuring Iann Dior – "Mood"
29	17 October 2020	24kGoldn featuring Iann Dior – "Mood"
30	24 October 2020	Internet Money ft. Gunna & Don Toliver – "Lemonade"
31	31 October 2020	Ariana Grande – "positions"
32	7 November 2020	Ariana Grande – "positions"
33	14 November 2020	Ariana Grande – "positions"
34	21 November 2020	Ariana Grande – "positions"
35	28 November 2020	Ariana Grande – "positions"
36	5 December 2020	Ariana Grande – "positions"
37	12 December 2020	Mariah Carey – "All I Want for Christmas Is You"
38	19 December 2020	Mariah Carey – "All I Want for Christmas Is You"
39	9 January 2021	Little Mix – "Sweet Melody"
40	16 January 2021	Olivia Rodrigo – "Drivers License"
41	23 January 2021	Olivia Rodrigo – "Drivers License"
42	30 January 2021	Olivia Rodrigo – "Drivers License"
43	6 February 2021	Olivia Rodrigo – "Drivers License"
44	13 February 2021	Olivia Rodrigo – "Drivers License"
45	20 February 2021	Olivia Rodrigo – "Drivers License"
46	27 February 2021	Olivia Rodrigo – "Drivers License"
47	6 March 2021	Olivia Rodrigo – "Drivers License"
48	13 March 2021	Olivia Rodrigo – "Drivers License"
49	20 March 2021	Nathan Evans – "Wellerman (Sea Shanty)"
50	27 March 2021	Nathan Evans – "Wellerman (Sea Shanty)"

Notes

1. The artists that took part were (in alphabetical order):

5 Seconds of Summer, Anne-Marie, AJ Tracey, Biffy Clyro, Bastille, Celeste, Chris Martin, Dave Grohl, Dermot Kennedy, Dua Lipa, Ellie Goulding, Grace Carter, Hailee Steinfeld, Jess Glynne, Mabel, Paloma Faith, Rag'n'Bone Man, Rita Ora, Royal Blood, Sam Fender, Sean Paul, Sigrid, Yungblud and Zara Larsson.

=== Series 5 ===
#	Episode	Song
1	17 April 2021	Lil Nas X – "Montero (Call Me by Your Name)"
2	24 April 2021	Lil Nas X – "Montero (Call Me by Your Name)"
3	1 May 2021	Lil Nas X – "Montero (Call Me by Your Name)"
4	8 May 2021	Russ Millions & Tion Wayne – "Body"
5	15 May 2021	Russ Millions & Tion Wayne – "Body"
6	22 May 2021	Russ Millions & Tion Wayne – "Body"
7	29 May 2021	Olivia Rodrigo – "Good 4 U"
8	5 June 2021	Olivia Rodrigo – "Good 4 U"
9	12 June 2021	Olivia Rodrigo – "Good 4 U"
10	19 June 2021	Olivia Rodrigo – "Good 4 U"
11	11 September 2021	Ed Sheeran – "Bad Habits"
12	18 September 2021	Ed Sheeran – "Shivers"
13	25 September 2021	Ed Sheeran – "Shivers"
14	2 October 2021	Ed Sheeran – "Shivers"
15	9 October 2021	Ed Sheeran – "Shivers"
16	16 October 2021	Elton John & Dua Lipa – "Cold Heart (Pnau remix)"
17	23 October 2021	Adele – "Easy on Me"
18	30 October 2021	Adele – "Easy on Me"
19	6 November 2021	Adele – "Easy on Me"
20	13 November 2021	Adele – "Easy on Me"
21	8 January 2022	Adele – "Easy on Me"
22	15 January 2022	Gayle – "ABCDEFU"
23	22 January 2022	Cast of Disney's Encanto - "We Don't Talk About Bruno"
24	29 January 2022	Cast of Disney's Encanto - "We Don't Talk About Bruno"
25	5 February 2022	Cast of Disney's Encanto - "We Don't Talk About Bruno"
26	12 February 2022	Cast of Disney's Encanto - "We Don't Talk About Bruno"
27	19 February 2022	Cast of Disney's Encanto - "We Don't Talk About Bruno"
28	26 February 2022	Cast of Disney's Encanto - "We Don't Talk About Bruno"
29	5 March 2022	Cast of Disney's Encanto - "We Don't Talk About Bruno"
30	12 March 2022	Dave – "Starlight"

== Transmissions ==
Series	Start date	End date	Episodes
1	22 April 2017	17 March 2018	41
2	5 May 2018	30 March 2019	46
3	6 April 2019	28 March 2020	52
4	4 April 2020	27 March 2021	50
5	17 April 2021	12 March 2022	30
