= Where Do You Go =

Where Do You Go may refer to:

- "Where Do You Go" (Cher song)
- "Where Do You Go" (La Bouche song), also covered by No Mercy
- "Where Do You Go", a song by Bryan Rice from Confessional
- "Where Do You Go?", a song by Frank Sinatra from No One Cares

== See also ==
- "Where Do You Go To (My Lovely)?", a song by Peter Sarstedt
