= Another Piece of Me =

Studio album by Bryan Rice
- Released: 25 October 2010
- Genre: Pop, pop rock
- Label: RecArt
- Producer: Brix, Deekay, Kalle Engström, Mads Haugaard, Jukka Immonen, Boe Larsen, Oli Poulsen, Bryan Rice (exec.), Jimmi Riise (co-exec.), Startone Music, Harry Sommerdahl

Bryan Rice chronology
Good News (2007)	Another Piece of Me (2010)	A Live Piece of Me – The Scandic Sessions (2011)

Another Piece of Me is the third studio album by Danish pop singer Bryan Rice. It was released in Denmark on 25 October 2010 by RecArt Music.

== Track listing ==
No.	Title	Writer(s)	Producer(s)	Length
1.	"Breathing"	Peter Bjørnskov	Oli Poulsen	3:01
2.	"There for You"	Lene Dissing, Sune Haansbæk, Bjørnskov	Startone Music	3:44
3.	"The Riddle"	Boe Larsen, Hanne Sørvaag, Emil Gotthard	Larsen	3:27
4.	"Curtain Call" (featuring Julie)	Dissing, Thomas Stengaard, Claus Storgaard	Harry Sommerdahl	3:11
5.	"Every Day in Between"	Sørvaag, Sommerdahl	Sommerdahl	2:59
6.	"All I Have"	Bjørnskov	Startone Music	3:59
7.	"Make the Moment Last"	Ian Mack, Mathias Ramson	Brix	3:34
8.	"Things That Lovers Do"	Bryan Rice, Rune Braager, Marcus Winther-John	Sommerdahl, Kalle Engström	3:18
9.	"Live to Love Another Day"	Winther-John, Dissing, Bjørnskov	Startone Music	3:51
10.	"Watch the Stars" (featuring Emilia)	Sarah West Martin Larsson, Lee Hutton	Deekay	3:59
11.	"Any Passion Will Do"	Rice, Mogens Binderup	Mads Haugaard	3:46
12.	"Did That Smile Seem Fake?"	Björn Djupström, Rice, Jesper King	Larsen	3:29
13.	"Second Last Chance" (bonus track)	Hiten Bharadia, Iain James, Jukka Immonen	Immonen	3:57
