= All I Wanna Do (Martin Jensen song) =

Single by Martin Jensen
- Released: 8 April 2016
- Recorded: 2015–16
- Genre: Tropical house
- Length: 3:14
- Label: Disco:wax
- Songwriters: Martin Jensen; Lene Dissing; Peter Bjørnskov

Martin Jensen singles chronology
| "Miracles" (2015) | "All I Wanna Do" (2016) | "Solo Dance" (2016) |

"All I Wanna Do" is a song by Danish DJ and record producer Martin Jensen, featuring uncredited vocals by Bjørnskov. It was released on 8 April 2016 as digital download by Disco:wax. The song was written by Martin Jensen, Lene Dissing and Peter Bjørnskov.

== Music video ==
A music video to accompany the release of "All I Wanna Do" was first released onto YouTube on 10 June 2016 at a total length of three minutes and fourteen seconds, with a cameo appearance by Rachel Weisz.

== Track listing ==
Digital download
| No. | Title | Length |
|---|---|---|
| 1. | "All I Wanna Do" | 3:14 |

== Charts ==
=== Weekly charts ===
| Chart (2016) | Peak position |
|---|---|
| Denmark (Tracklisten) | 11 |
| Netherlands (Single Top 100) | 49 |
| Norway (VG-lista) | 10 |
| Sweden (Sverigetopplistan) | 24 |

=== Year-end charts ===
| Chart (2016) | Position |
|---|---|
| Sweden (Sverigetopplistan) | 75 |

== Certifications ==
| Region | Certification | Certified units/sales |
|---|---|---|
| Denmark (IFPI Danmark) | 2× Platinum | 180,000^{‡} |
| Netherlands (NVPI) | Gold | 20,000^{‡} |
| Norway (IFPI Norway) | 3× Platinum | 180,000^{‡} |
Streaming
| Sweden (GLF) | 3× Platinum | 24,000,000^{†} |
^{‡} Sales+streaming figures based on certification alone.^{†} Streaming-only figures based on certification alone.

== Release history ==
| Region | Date | Format | Label |
|---|---|---|---|
| Denmark | 8 April 2016 | Digital download | Disco:wax |
