= Miracles (Martin Jensen song) =

Single by Martin Jensen featuring Bjørnskov
- Released: 6 November 2015
- Recorded: 2015
- Length: 3:32
- Label: Disco:wax
- Songwriter(s): Peter Bjørnskov, Lene Dissing, Mads Hjerl-Hansen, Martin Jensen

Martin Jensen singles chronology
"Night After Night" (2015)	"Miracles" (2015)	"All I Wanna Do" (2016)

"Miracles" is a song by Danish DJ and producer Martin Jensen featuring Bjørnskov. It was released on 6 November 2015 as digital download by Disco:wax. The song has peaked to number 26 on the Danish Singles Chart.

== Music video ==
A music video to accompany the release of "Miracles" was first released onto YouTube on 18 December 2015 at a total length of three minutes and thirty-three seconds.

== Track listing ==
Digital download
No.	Title	Length
1.	"Miracles"	3:32

== Charts ==
=== Weekly charts ===
Chart (2015–16)	Peak position
Denmark (Tracklisten)	26

== Certifications ==
Region	Certification	Certified units/sales
Denmark (IFPI Danmark)	Gold	30,000^{^}
Streaming
Sweden (GLF)	Gold	4,000,000^{†}
^{^} Shipments figures based on certification alone.^{†} Streaming-only figures based on certification alone.

== Release history ==
Region	Date	Format	Label
Denmark	6 November 2015	Digital download	Disco:wax
