= Good News (Bryan Rice album) =

Studio album by Bryan Rice
- Released: 22 October 2007
- Genre: Pop
- Length: 40:38
- Label: Border Breakers
- Producer: Harry Sommerdahl, Rune Westberg, Thomas Gustafsson, Ian-Paolo Lira, Hugo Lira, Marcus Dernulf

Bryan Rice chronology
Confessional (2006)	Good News (2007)	Another Piece of Me (2010)

Singles from Good News
- 1. "I Lied" Released: 13 April 2007; 2. "Good News" Released: 2007; 3. "Sleeping Satellite" Released: 2007; 4. "Here I Am" Released: 2008

Good News is the second album by Danish pop singer Bryan Rice. It was released in Denmark on 22 October 2007 by Border Breakers. The album entered the Danish Albums Chart at No. 36.

== Track listing ==
No.	Title	Writer(s)	Producer(s)	Length
1.	"Here I Am"	Marcus Dernulf, Johan "Jones" Wetterberg, Per Eklund	Marcus Dernulf	3:45
2.	"A Call for Help"	Mack, Robert Habolin	Rune Westberg	3:14
3.	"I Lied"	Hanne Sørvaag, Harry Sommerdahl	Harry Sommerdahl	3:03
4.	"Good News"	Mack, Robert Habolin, Johan Aberg	Harry Sommerdahl	3:40
5.	"Sleeping Satellite"	Tasmin Archer, John Beck, John Hughes	Thomas Gustafsson, Ian-Paolo Lira, Hugo Lira	4:07
6.	"Those Who Love Us the Most"	Per Aldeheim, Dennis Morgan	Thomas Gustafsson, Ian-Paolo Lira, Hugo Lira	4:16
7.	"This Is for You"	Pelle Nylén, Magnus Fridh	Harry Sommerdahl	3:57
8.	"Everywhere You'll Be"	Mads Haugaard, Bryan Rice	Harry Sommerdahl	3:45
9.	"Just Walk Away"	Steve Torch, Neil Taylor	Harry Sommerdahl	3:40
10.	"Simply Complicated"	Rune Westberg, Bryan Rice	Rune Westberg	3:59
11.	"We're Not"	Harry Sommerdahl, Hanne Sørvaag, Derek McDonald	Harry Sommerdahl	3:06

== Charts ==
=== Weekly charts ===
Chart (2007)	Peak position
Danish Albums (Hitlisten)	36
