= Confessional (Bryan Rice album) =

Studio album by Bryan Rice
- Released: 24 April 2006
- Recorded: 2005–2006
- Genre: Pop
- Length: 40:42
- Label: EMI; Boom!
- Producer: Frederik Andersson; Chief 1; Thomas Gustafsson; Jonas JebergHugo Lira; Ian-Paolo Lira; Pelle Nylén; Remee; Bryan Rice (co-exec.) Harry Sommerdahl; (exec.); Michael Bernhard (co-exec.)

Bryan Rice chronology
Confessional (2006)	Good News (2007)

Singles from Confessional
- 1. "No Promises" Released: 22 October 2005; 2. "Homeless Heart" Released: 24 April 2006; 3. "Can't Say I'm Sorry" Released: 30 October 2006

Confessional is the debut album by Danish pop singer Bryan Rice. It was released in Denmark on 24 April 2006 by EMI. The album includes the lead single "No Promises", which was a huge hit in Denmark in late 2005/early 2006, before Shayne Ward covered the song. The album reached No. 4 in the official Danish album chart.

== Track listing ==
No.	Title	Writer(s)	Producer(s)	Length
1.	"Confessional"	Steve Lee; Tina Harris; Pete Gordeno; Jamie Hartman	Thomas Gustafsson; Ian-Paolo Lira; Hugo Lira	4:12
2.	"No Promises"	Jonas Schrøder; Lucas Sieber	Chief 1	3:54
3.	"Homeless Heart"	Andreas Carlsson; Desmond Child; Harry Sommerdahl	Sommerdahl	3:02
4.	"Can't Say I'm Sorry"	Carlsson; Pelle Nylén	Nylén; Frederik Andersson	3:47
5.	"We Can"	Henrik Korpi; Mathias Wollo; Tom Nichols	Chief 1	3:49
6.	"Not Enough"	Harris; Christian Walz; Mo Brandis	Jonas Jeberg	4:06
7.	"Fragile"	Harris; Alan Bremner; Jamie Hartman; Liz Winstanley	Chief 1	3:30
8.	"Where Do You Go"	Rice; Schrøder; Lucas Sieber; Lars Pedersen; Niels Brinck	Chief 1	3:46
9.	"In Your Room"	Carlsson; Lisa Greene; Gareth Gates	Sommerdahl	3:29
10.	"The Last Two on Earth"	Carlson; Greene; Sommerdahl; Storm Lee	Sommerdahl	3:33
11.	"Crying Shame"	Silje Nergaard; Michael McGurk	Sommerdahl	3:29

== Charts ==
=== Weekly charts ===
Chart (2006/07)	Peak position
Danish Albums (Hitlisten)	4

== Certifications ==
Region	Certification	Certified units/sales
Denmark (IFPI Danmark)	Gold	20,000^{^}
^{^} Shipments figures based on certification alone.
