= Solo Dance (song) =

Single by Martin Jensen
- Released: 4 November 2016
- Recorded: 2016
- Genre: Tropical house; EDM
- Length: 2:54; 3:30 (music video version)
- Label: Disco:wax; Ultra Music; Polydor
- Songwriters: Martin Jensen; Lene Dissing; Mads Dyhrberg; Peter Bjørnskov
- Producers: Martin Jensen; Mads Dyhrberg

Martin Jensen singles chronology
"All I Wanna Do" (2016)	"Solo Dance" (2016)	"Middle of the Night" (2017)

"Solo Dance" is a song by Danish DJ and producer Martin Jensen. It was released on 4 November 2016 as digital download by Ultra Music. The song was written by Martin Jensen, Lene Dissing, Mads Dyhrberg and Peter Bjørnskov. The song is Jensen's most successful to date, reaching the top 20 in 14 European countries and having more than 750 million plays on the streaming service Spotify.

Initially, the female vocalist on the song remained anonymous. According to Jensen, "She actually was one of my friends' friend[s]. He found her on the street when she was a jazz singer. She has an incredible voice, and her live [vocal] is really really good." In November 2017, she was revealed as Danish singer Theresa Rex.

== Music video ==
The official music video for the song was released on 27 January 2017, through Ultra Music and Martin Jensen's YouTube account. It was directed by Nicolas Tobias Følsgaard and choreographed by Tobias Ellehammer and stars dancers such as Haeni Kim, Dylan Mayoral, Jamie Telford, Sandra Brünnich, Lianne Lee May, Michel Patric Sian, Remi Black and Cilia Trappaud, who dance throughout the whole video, while Martin Jensen plays the music at the back.

It tells a very loose version of the classic "Boy meets girl, loses girl, wins girl back again" storyline.

== Track listing ==
Digital download
No.	Title	Length
1.	"Solo Dance"	2:54

Digital download – From Morning Till Midnight
No.	Title	Length
1.	"Solo Dance" (Acoustic Mix)	3:12
2.	"Solo Dance" (Club Mix)	4:21

== Charts ==
=== Weekly charts ===
Chart (2016–17)	Peak position
Australia (ARIA)	40
Austria (Ö3 Austria Top 40)	14
Belgium (Ultratip Bubbling Under Flanders)	6
Belgium (Ultratop 50 Wallonia)	41
Canada Hot 100 (Billboard)	82
Czech Republic Airplay (ČNS IFPI)	4
Czech Republic Singles Digital (ČNS IFPI)	12
Denmark (Tracklisten)	7
Finland (Suomen virallinen lista)	19
France (SNEP)	51
Germany (GfK)	14
Hungary (Rádiós Top 40)	26
Hungary (Single Top 40)	28
Ireland (IRMA)	9
Italy (FIMI)	32
Latvia Streaming (LaIPA)	96
Netherlands (Dutch Top 40)	37
Netherlands (Single Top 100)	20
New Zealand Heatseekers (RMNZ)	8
Norway (VG-lista)	7
Poland Airplay (ZPAV)	44
Portugal (AFP)	30
Scottish Singles Sales (Official Charts)	4
Slovakia Airplay (ČNS IFPI)	71
Slovakia Singles Digital (ČNS IFPI)	14
Spain (PROMUSICAE)	99
Sweden (Sverigetopplistan)	7
Switzerland (Schweizer Hitparade)	17
UK Dance (Official Charts)	1
UK Singles (Official Charts)	7
US Hot Dance/Electronic Songs (Billboard)	17

=== Year-end charts ===
Chart (2017)	Position
Austria (Ö3 Austria Top 40)	38
Belgium (Ultratop Wallonia)	80
Denmark (Tracklisten)	32
France (SNEP)	126
Germany (Official German Charts)	47
Hungary (Stream Top 40)	40
Italy (FIMI)	91
Latvia Airplay (LaIPA)	76
Netherlands (Single Top 100)	46
Sweden (Sverigetopplistan)	13
Switzerland (Schweizer Hitparade)	36
UK Singles (Official Charts Company)	15
US Hot Dance/Electronic Songs (Billboard)	37

== Certifications ==
Region	Certification	Certified units/sales
Brazil (Pro-Música Brasil)	2× Platinum	120,000^{‡}
Canada (Music Canada)	Platinum	80,000^{‡}
Denmark (IFPI Danmark)	3× Platinum	270,000^{‡}
France (SNEP)	Platinum	133,333^{‡}
Germany (BVMI)	Platinum	400,000^{‡}
Italy (FIMI)	2× Platinum	100,000^{‡}
New Zealand (RMNZ)	2× Platinum	60,000^{‡}
Norway (IFPI Norway)	4× Platinum	240,000^{‡}
Portugal (AFP)	Gold	5,000^{‡}
Spain (Promusicae)	Gold	30,000^{‡}
United Kingdom (BPI)	2× Platinum	1,200,000^{‡}
Streaming
Sweden (GLF)	8× Platinum	64,000,000^{†}
^{‡} Sales+streaming figures based on certification alone.^{†} Streaming-only figures based on certification alone.

== Release history ==
Region	Date	Format	Version	Label
Denmark	4 November 2016	Digital download	Original	Disco:wax; Ultra Music; Polydor
United States	23 June 2017	Digital download	From Morning Till Midnight	Disco:wax; Ultra Music
