= Can't Say I'm Sorry =

Song

Single by Bryan Rice

from the album Confessional
- Released: 30 October 2006
- Genre: Pop
- Length: 3:02
- Label: EMI, Boom! Records
- Songwriter(s): Pelle Nylén, Andreas Carlsson
- Producer(s): Pelle Nylén, Frederik Andersson

Bryan Rice singles chronology
"Homeless Heart" (2006)	"Can't Say I'm Sorry" (2006)	"Where Do You Go" (2006)

"Can't Say I'm Sorry" is a song by Danish pop singer Bryan Rice. It was written by Pelle Nylén and Andreas Carlsson, and released as the third single from the singer's debut album, Confessional on 30 October 2006.

== Track listing ==
- Digital download
1. "Can't Say I'm Sorry" (Remee & Jay Jay Mix) – 3:02

== Erik Segerstedt version ==
"I Can't Say I'm Sorry"

Single by Erik Segerstedt

from the album A Different Shade
- Released: 2007
- Genre: Pop
- Label: Sony BMG
- Songwriter(s): Pelle Nylén, Andreas Carlsson

Erik Segerstedt singles chronology
"I Can't Say I'm Sorry" (2007)	"How Did We Change" (2007)

Music video
- "I Can't Say I'm Sorry" on YouTube

Runner-up of the third season of Idol in Sweden, Erik Segerstedt released the song as his debut single in 2007 from his debut album A Different Shade. It peaked at number one in Sweden.

=== Charts ===
Chart (2010)	Peak position
Sweden (Sverigetopplistan)	1

== Theo Tams version ==
Canadian pop singer and the winner of the sixth season of Canadian Idol, Theo Tams, covered this song for his debut album, Give It All Away in 2009.
