= Bryan Rice =

Danish pop singer (born 1978)

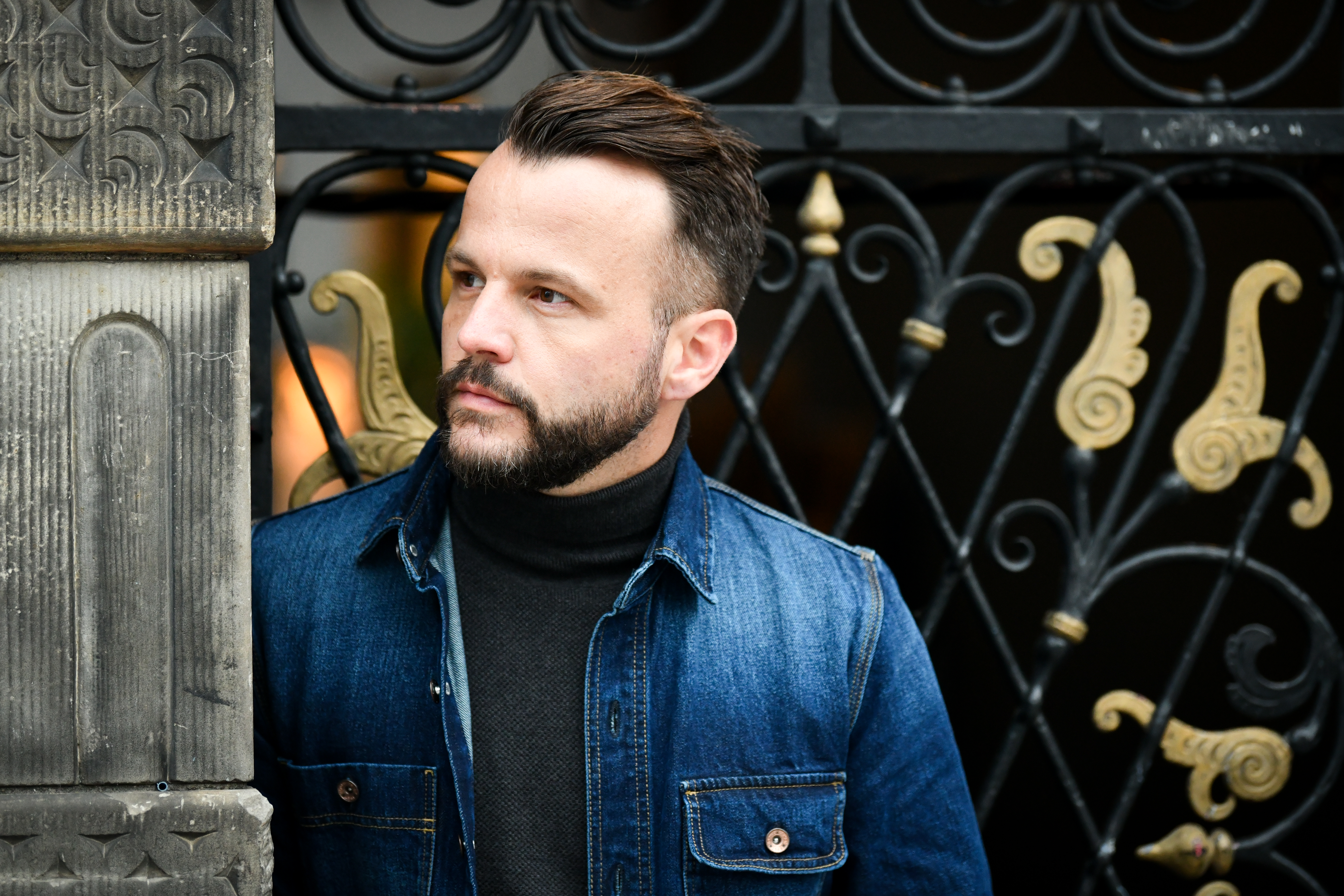
- Photo by Philippe Motet Jessen

Background information
- Born: Brian Risberg Clausen; 29 May 1978 (age 48); Viby, Roskilde, Denmark
- Genre: Pop
- Occupations: Singer, songwriter
- Years active: 2005–present
- Labels: Boom! Records/EMI (2005–2006); Border Breakers (2007–2009); RecArt (2010–present) Belgium/Luxembourg-BIP Records – 21st Century Music-Netherlands; DO IT Records (2012)
- Spouse: Mads Enggaard (m. 2018)
- Website: www.bryanrice.com

Brian Risberg Clausen, better known as Bryan Rice (born 29 May 1978 in Viby, Roskilde, Denmark), is a Danish pop singer and songwriter. He is best known for his debut single "No Promises" and for competing in the Dansk Melodi Grand Prix in 2010 and 2014.

== Career ==
Rice released is debut single "No Promises" in October 2005. The song was released on the Nynne soundtrack. The song peaked at number 1 on the Danish Hitlisten Airplay in January 2006. The song was later covered and released by British The X Factor winner Shayne Ward reaching number two in the United Kingdom.

In April 2006 Rice released "Homeless Heart", a cover of the Amanda Stott song and also peaked at number 1 on the Danish Hitlisten Airplay in May 2006. The song was used as the opening theme to the Danish reality television program Paradise Hotel. In April 2006, Rice released his debut album, Confessional which peaked at number 4 on the Danish chart. Rice was nominated Best Danish Male Singer at the 2006 Zulu Awards.

In October 2007, Rice released his second studio album, Good News which peaked at number 36 on the Danish chart.

In 2009 Rice co-wrote the song "Underneath My Skin", with Mads Haugaard, sung by Norwegian singer Christina Undhjem, who participated in the Dansk Melodi Grand Prix.

In 2010, Rice competed in the Dansk Melodi Grand Prix with the song "Breathing", written by Peter Bjørnskov. The song finishing second.

On 25 October 2010 Rice released his third studio album, Another Piece of Me. The album features duets with Danish singer Julie Berthelsen and Swedish vocalist Emilia.

In 2014, Rice competed in the Dansk Melodi Grand Prix with the song, ""I Choose U", but the song was eliminated before the final round.

== Personal life ==
Rice came out as gay when he was 17 years old. Rice married his husband Mads Enggaard on June 16, 2018. Together, they have one daughter (b. 2016). (Note: Their daughter was born from a woman from Copenhagen who was a friend of Mads and was adopted by Rice and Enggaard after their marriage.)

== Discography ==
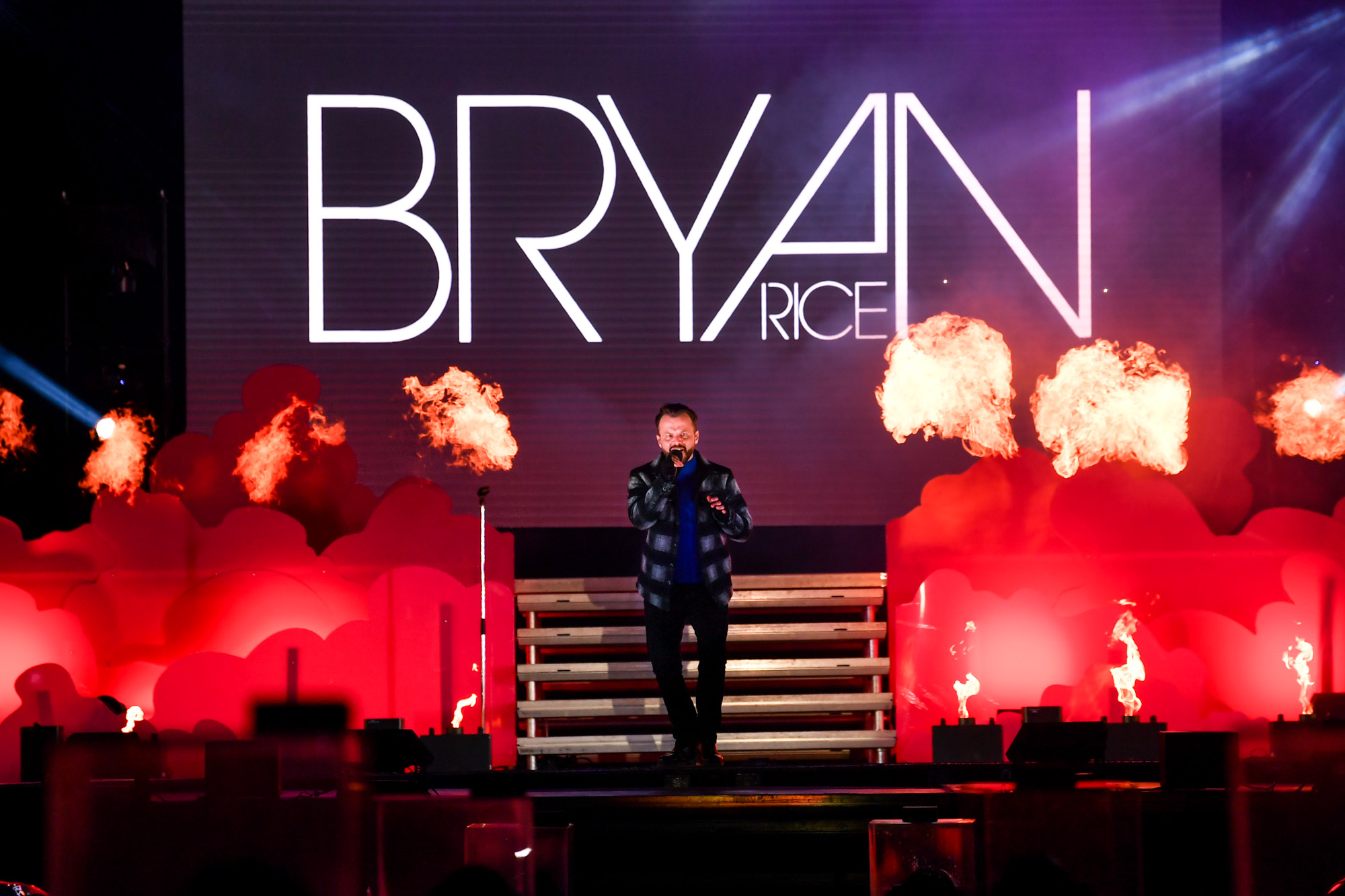
Photo by Philippe Motet Jessen

=== Studio albums ===
Title	Details	Peak chart positions	Certifications
Title	Details	DEN	Certifications
Confessional	Released: 24 April 2006; Label: Boom! Records Denmark (3628772); Formats: CD, Cassette, digital download	4	IFPI: Gold
Good News	Released: 22 October 2007; Label: Border Breakers (570837400042); Formats: CD, digital download	36	
Another Piece of Me	Released: 25 October 2010; Label: RecArt Music (R 60179-2); Formats: CD, digital download	—	
Hear Me As I Am	Released: 23 February 2015; Label: ArtPeople (APCD 60573); Formats: CD, digital download	—	

=== Live albums ===
Title	Details
A Live Piece of Me - The Scandic Sessions	Released: 24 November 2011; Label: BRec (BRec11-01); Formats: CD, digital download; Note: Recorded live on 2 April 2011 at Scandic Copenhagen, Denmark.

=== Compilation albums ===
Title	Details
Bryan PT.1 + PT.2	Released: November 2017; Label: BRec (BREC17-01); Formats: CD, digital download, streaming; Note: EPs Bryan Part 1 and Bryan Part 2

=== Extended plays ===
Title	Details
Bryan Part 1	Released: September 2017; Label: BRec; Formats: digital download, streaming
Bryan Part 2	Released: November 2017; Label: BRec; Formats: digital download, streaming

=== Singles as lead artist ===
Year	Title	Peak positions		Album
Year	Title	DEN	BEL (Vl)	Album
2005	"No Promises"	— (Note: "No Promises" peaked at number 1 on the Hitlisten Airplay.)	—	Confessional
2006	"Homeless Heart"	— (Note: "Homeless Heart" peaked at number 1 on the Hitlisten Airplay.)	—	Confessional
2006	"Better Part of Me (Hey Baby)"	—	—	non album single
2006	"Can't Say I'm Sorry"	— (Note: "Can't Say I'm Sorry" peaked at number 5 on the Hitlisten Airplay.)	—	Confessional
2007	"I Lied"	—	—	Good News
2007	"Good News"	—	—	Good News
2007	"Sleeping Satellite"	—	—	Good News
2008	"Here I Am"	—	—	Good News
2009	"Second Last Chance"	—	—	Another Piece of Me (bonus track)
2010	"Breathing"	3	—	Another Piece of Me
2010	"Make The Moment Last"	—	—	Another Piece of Me
2010	"Curtain Call" (featuring Julie)	—	15	Another Piece of Me
2011	"For the Love of the Game"	—	—	2011 UEFA European Under-21 Championship
2012	"Watch the Stars" (featuring Emilia)	—	— (Note: "Watch the Stars" peaked at number 41 on the Ultratip chart.)	Another Piece of Me
2013	"These Arms"	—	—	Hear Me As I Am
2013	"Stay Awake" (Guéna LG featuring Bryan Rice)	—	—	Momentum
2014	"I Choose U"	—	—	Hear Me As I Am
2014	"Waiting for Love"	—	—	Hear Me As I Am
2014	"Hear Me As I Am"	—	—	Hear Me As I Am
2015	"Beat of My Own Drum"	—	—	Hear Me As I Am
2015	"Parachute"	—	—	Hear Me As I Am
2015	"Where the Heart Lies" (with Maggie Reilly	—	—	non album single
2016	"Eat, Sleep, Love and Applause"	—	—	
2017	"Warriors" (featuring Who Killed Bambi)	—	—	Bryan Part 1
2017	"I Love It" (In Concert with Ole Henriksen featuring Aalborg Symfoniorkester)	—	—	non album single
2017	"Tell It To My Body"	—	—	Bryan Part 1
2018	"Glow" (featuring Camille Jones)	—	—	TBA
2019	"Ønsketid" (featuring Det Danske Drengekor)	—	—	non album singles
2019	"Christmas with You" (featuring The Danish Boys Choir)	—	—	non album singles
2021	"Cheesy"	—	—	TBA
2021	"Yes to It All"	—	—	TBA
2022	"We Can Be Heroes"	—	—	TBA
2022	"It's Christmas and I'm Coming Home"	—	—	TBA
2023	"Cloudless"	—	—	TBA
