= Sí (Martin Jensen song) =

Single by Martin Jensen
- Released: 20 March 2015
- Recorded: 2014
- Genre: Dance; pop
- Length: 2:58
- Label: Disco:wax

Martin Jensen singles chronology
| "Sí" (2015) | "Night After Night" (2015) |

"Sí" is the debut single by Danish DJ and producer Martin Jensen. It was released on 20 March 2015 as digital download by Disco:wax. The single has peaked to number 55 on the Swedish Singles Chart. The single is a remix of a Cristiano Ronaldo celebration at the 2014 FIFA Ballon d'Or, which gained him a lot of popularity in many Latin countries.

== Music video ==
A music video to accompany the release of "Sí" was first released onto YouTube on 5 July 2015 at a total length of two minutes and fifty-eight seconds.

== Track listing ==
Digital download
| No. | Title | Length |
|---|---|---|
| 1. | "Sí" | 2:58 |

== Charts ==
=== Weekly charts ===
| Chart (2015) | Peak position |
|---|---|
| Sweden (Sverigetopplistan) | 55 |

== Certifications ==
| Region | Certification | Certified units/sales |
|---|---|---|
| Denmark (IFPI Danmark) | Gold | 45,000^{‡} |
| Norway (IFPI Norway) | Gold | 30,000^{‡} |
Streaming
| Sweden (GLF) | Platinum | 8,000,000^{†} |
^{‡} Sales+streaming figures based on certification alone.^{†} Streaming-only figures based on certification alone.

== Release history ==
| Region | Date | Format | Label |
|---|---|---|---|
| Denmark | 20 March 2015 | Digital download | Disco:wax |
