= Breathing (Bryan Rice song) =

Single by Bryan Rice

from the album Another Piece of Me
- Released: February 2010
- Recorded: 2009
- Genre: pop
- Length: 3:02
- Label: RecArt Music
- Songwriter(s): Peter Bjørnskov
- Producer(s): Óli Poulsen

Bryan Rice singles chronology
"Second Last Chance" (2009)	"Breathing" (2010)	"There for You" (2010)

"Breathing" is a pop song written by Peter Bjørnskov and recorded by Danish singer Bryan Rice. The song was included on his third studio album, Another Piece of Me.

On 12 January 2010, "Breathing" was announced as one of the ten songs to compete in the Dansk Melodi Grand Prix to select the song to represent Denmark in the Eurovision Song Contest 2010. On 6 February, the song made it to the super final, ultimately finishing second behind "In a Moment like This" by Chanée & N'evergreen.

== Track listing ==
- Digital download
1. "Breathing" – 3:02

== Weekly charts ==
Chart (2010)	Peak position
Denmark (Tracklisten)	3
