= Max and Harvey =

English singing duo

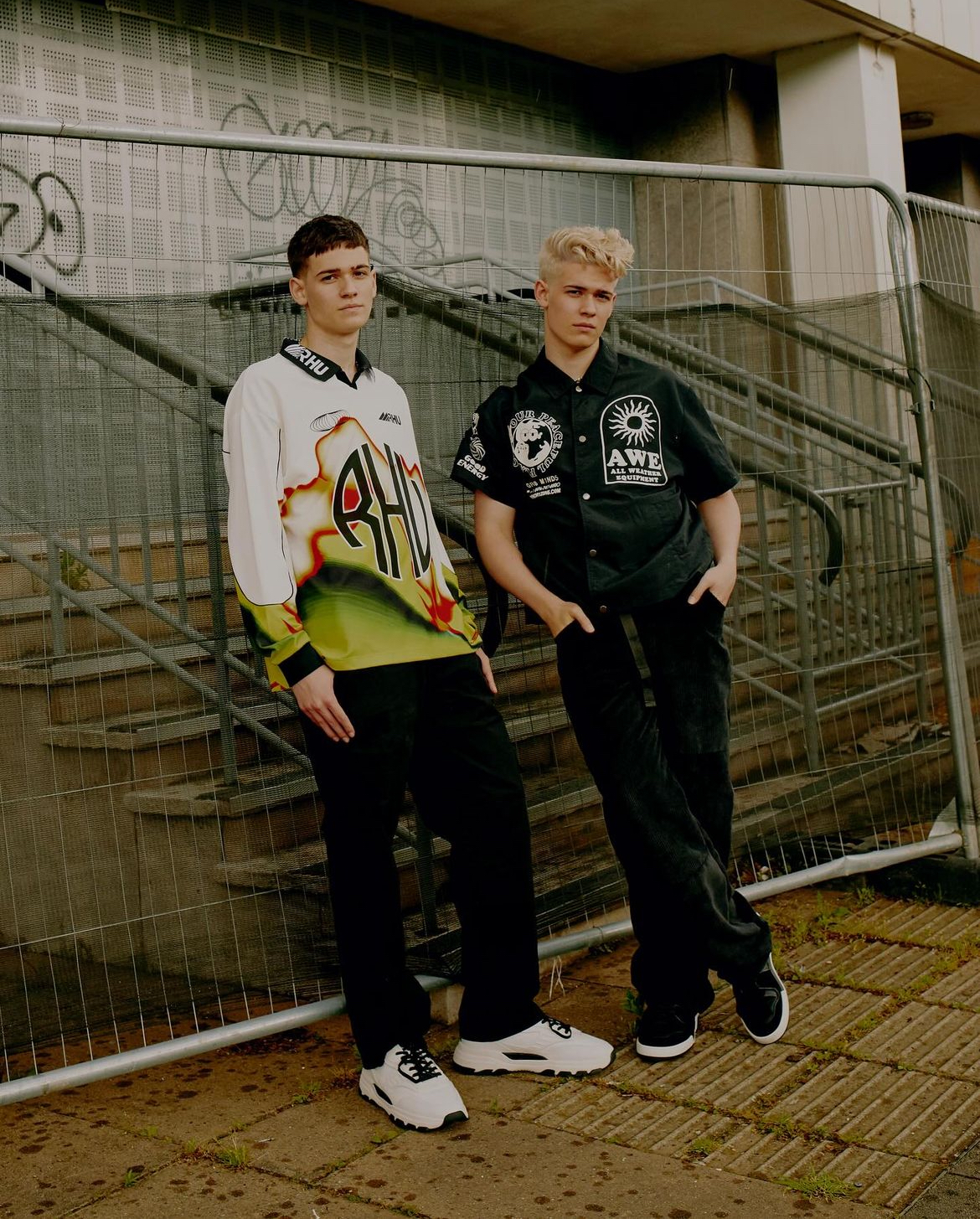

Background information
- Born: 31 December 2002 (age 23); Sandhurst, Berkshire, England
- Origin: Sandhurst, Berkshire, England
- Genre: Pop
- Years active: 2016–present
- Members: Max Luca Mills; Harvey Kitt Mills
- Website: maxandharveyofficial.com

Max Luca Mills and Harvey Kitt Mills are an English twin singing duo who rose to prominence after posting singing videos on social media. In 2019, they competed in The X Factor: Celebrity and finished in second place. They have 7 million followers on the social media app TikTok.

== Career ==
Harvey Kitt Mills and Max Luca Mills are identical twins. They first appeared in public as toddlers both alternatively playing 'Thomas' on the ITV romantic drama William and Mary featuring Martin Clunes and Julie Graham in 2005. They began singing at eight years old.

In 2009, Harvey played the part of Benjamin in the West End’s production of “Priscilla, Queen of the Desert.” In 2012, they starred in the Channel 4 short film “Double Take.” In 2015, at the ages of 12, the duo took part in the UK tour of the production of “The Sound of Music,” alternating the part of Friedrich.

They joined the social platform musical.ly in March 2016 and began creating their videos by lip-syncing to songs from a variety of musicians, including Shawn Mendes, Avicii, and Bastille, before creating their own original content.

Following their success with musical.ly, Max and Harvey released their debut single "One More Day in Love" in December 2016. This was followed up by the release of a cover of DJ Snake and Justin Bieber's song "Let Me Love You" in January 2017, and the original song "Stuck on the Ceiling" and the cover "Words" (by The Vamps) in October and November 2017. Max and Harvey released their first Christmas single, "I Wish It Could Be Christmas Everyday" in December 2017.

In 2017, BBC's children's television strand CBBC aired My Life: Max & Harvey, a documentary produced by the duo, which gave fans an inside look into their lives and career. That same year, BBC released a DVD Max and Harvey (in a show) and Penguin UK published Max & Harvey: In A Book, which chronicles their musical.ly careers and the path to making their CBBC documentary, as well as giving readers an inside look at their lives. In 2018, the CBBC gave the duo their own TV show, "Fear Of Missing Out" (FOMO).

In April 2018, Max and Harvey became the first to sign with RMI Records, a new label formed by Disney Music Group. In October 2018, they released the single Trade Hearts.

In February 2019, the duo released their debut EP Coming Soon, including songs; Where were you, Nervous, Trade Hearts and Trade Hearts (acoustic), and in July 2019, the pair released the single Electric, a collaboration with Jayden Bartels. They celebrated the release of this single by performing a concert in Anaheim.

In September 2019, Max and Harvey self-released the single, Stranger.

In February 2020, it was announced that Max and Harvey will join Jordan Banjo, Perri Keily, and Holly H in hosting Nickelodeon's Slimefest 2021. They also became Charity Patrons for the Royal Manchester Children’s Hospital Charity, stating that, “We are excited and proud to have been asked to be patrons for the Royal Manchester Children’s Hospital Charity. We love going to visit them and have been raising money over the last few years for the Charity through selling personal video messages for our fans. The staff and kids we visit at the hospital are such an inspiration and we are honoured to become Charity Patrons.”

In April 2020, Max and Harvey hosted a 24-hour live stream to raise money for the Royal Manchester Children’s Hospital and the Sebastian’s Action Trust and they raised over £7000.

In November 2020, they announced their new Spotify Original podcast called “School Daze with Max & Harvey,” where they talk to different celebrities about their school life and talk about issues you may face in school. In April 2021, the duo rebranded their podcast in a new series named “The Max and Harvey Podcast,” where they exclusively give an insight to their lives and chat to fellow artists and social media influencers.

In December 2020, the duo released a new single “Worry a Little Less” via Frtyfve Records, and announced a UK 10-date tour - “This is Not a Phase” in August 2021, which was later rescheduled to April 2022.

In 2021, they released several singles such as “In My DNA”, "Lonely" and "She Moves in Her Own Way", a cover of the song of the same name by the Kooks.

In 2024, they created a podcast with their younger sister Tilly called "13 Again". They have since done multiple live shows, touring the UK and Australia. As of June 2026, the podcast has amassed over 177,000 subscribers and 28,945,000 views on YouTube.

In 2026, Max & Harvey announced a UK tour entitled "Max & Harvey: In A Decade - 10 Years of "Controlled" Chaos.

== Awards ==
The duo was nominated for Muser of the Year at the 2017 Shorty Awards. In 2018, they were nominated for Social Star at the iHeartRadio Music Awards, and Favorite Social Music Artist at the Radio Disney Music Awards, which they won during the awards on 22 June 2018.

In 2019, Max and Harvey were nominated for YouTube Musician at the Shorty Awards and for Favourite Social Music Star at the Nickelodeon Kids' Choice Awards.

In 2020, the duo received their second nomination for Favourite Social Music Star at the Nickelodeon Kids’ Choice Awards.
