= A Different Shade =

Studio album by Erik Segerstedt
- Released: February 1, 2007 (Sweden)
- Genres: Pop, Rock
- Label: Sony BMG

Singles from A Different Shade
- 1. "I Can't Say I'm Sorry"; 2. "How Did We Change"

A Different Shade is the debut studio album from Swedish singer Erik Segerstedt, released on February 1, 2007. It debuted at number two on the Swedish Albums Chart. The album spawned two singles, "Can't Say I'm Sorry", a number-one single, and "How Did we Change", a number-two single.

== Track listing ==
1. "2 Happy 2 Soon"
2. "How Did We Change"
3. "I Can't Say I'm Sorry"
4. "When I Hear You Say My Name"
5. "Wherever You Are"
6. "I'm Not Alone"
7. "Bring My Baby Back"
8. "She's So"
9. "Freeway"
10. "Knockin' on Heaven's Door"
11. "Everything Changes"

== Charts ==
Chart (2007)	Peak position
Swedish Albums (Sverigetopplistan)	2
