= Martin Jensen (DJ) =

Danish DJ and producer (born 1991)

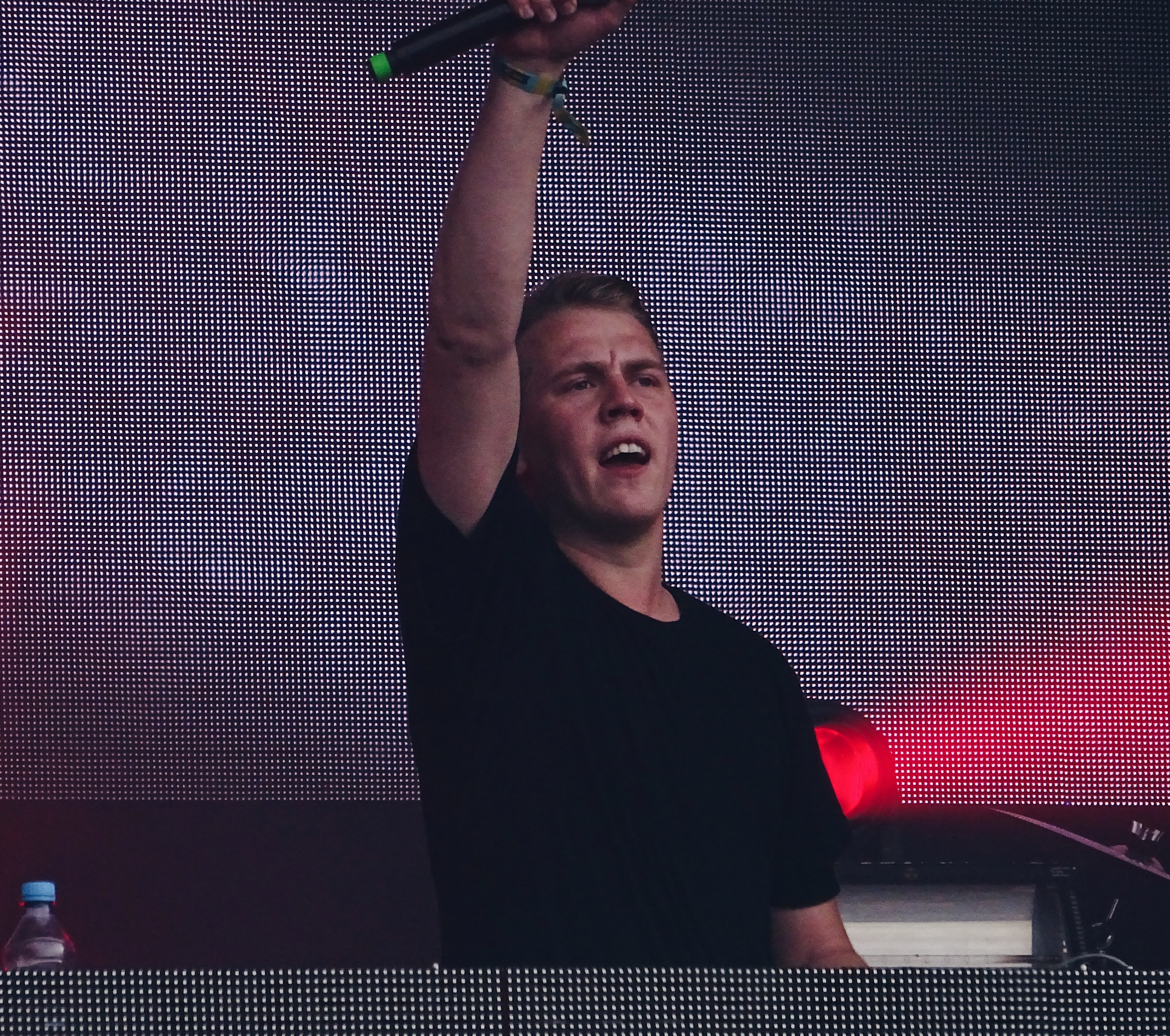
- Martin Jensen playing live at Lollapalooza 2017

Background information
- Born: Martin Jensen; 29 September 1991 (age 34); Silkeborg, Denmark
- Genres: Tropical house; dance
- Occupations: DJ; record producer
- Years active: 2014–present
- Labels: Sony Music; Disco:wax; Rave Culture
- Website: djmartinjensen.com

Martin Jensen (born 29 September 1991) is a Danish DJ and record producer best known for the 2016 single "Solo Dance". His videos feature sounds sampled from viral videos and made into tropical house mixes. He has over 10 years of experience of being club DJ, in Sunny Beach. In October 2016, he was ranked 82 out of the 100 best DJs in the world by DJ Magazine. In 2018, he was ranked 56 out of the 100 best DJs in the world. In October 2019, Jensen was ranked 45 out of DJ Mag's 100 best DJs in the world placing 9 positions higher than the previous year.

== Early life ==
Martin was born in Silkeborg, Denmark in 1991. He trained as a contractor and machine mechanic. He worked as a seller at the machine trader Sorring Maskinhandel, which was founded by his father, Jørgen Jensen, in 1990. He started DJing at an early age, but became widely known in 2014.

== Personal life ==
Martin Jensen dated Irish model Natasha Samsara until 2021, where they met in Bangkok, Thailand.

== Career ==
His first single is called "Sí", which is a remix of a Cristiano Ronaldo celebration at the 2014 FIFA Ballon d'Or, gained him a lot of popularity in many Latin countries. His breakthrough came with the single "Miracles" in 2015, featuring Danish singer Bjørnskov, with more than 20 million streams on Spotify. In 2016, he released the single "All I Wanna Do" which also became a success, with more than 60 million streams at Spotify. His latest single "Solo Dance" from 2016, also became a success, and has so far made it into top 44 of Spotify's Global Top 50, with over 1,200,000 daily streams. In 2017, Jensen released the song "Wait" featuring New York-based duo Loote. In 2018, he released the singles "Pull up" and "16 Steps" (with Olivia Holt). 20 October 2018 saw the release of his first EP titled World. The EP consists of the songs "Rio", "Djoba" (with DOLF), "Pharaoh", "Osaki" and "Valhalla" (with Faustix), which were released over five days starting 15 October.

On 10 April 2020, he premiered "Me, Myself, Online", a live event broadcast on Twitch from Parken Stadium, with a peak viewership of over 35,000 people. Following the success of the event, he presented further broadcasts from a private hangar at Billund airport on 24 April, and on the rear deck of the HDMS Niels Juel (F363) on 8 May.

On 11 September 2020, it was announced that Jensen would replace Ankerstjerne as a judge for the fourteenth season of X Factor alongside returning judges Thomas Blachman and Oh Land.

== Discography ==
=== Singles ===
Title	Year	Peak chart positions										Certifications	Album
Title	Year	DEN	AUS	AUT	FRA	GER	NL	NOR	SWE	SWI	UK	Certifications	Album
"Sí"	2015	—	—	—	—	—	—	—	55	—	—	IFPI DEN: Gold; GLF: Platinum; IFPI NOR: Gold	Non-album singles
"Night After Night"	2015	—	—	—	—	—	—	—	— (Note: "Night After Night" did not chart on the Swedish Singles Chart, but peaked at number 19 on the Swedish Heatseeker chart.)	—	—	GLF: Gold; IFPI NOR: Gold	Non-album singles
"Miracles"	2015	26	—	—	—	—	—	—	—	—	—	IFPI DEN: Gold; GLF: Gold	Non-album singles
"All I Wanna Do"	2016	11	—	—	—	—	49	10	24	—	—	IFPI DEN: 2× Platinum; GLF: 3× Platinum; IFPI NOR: 3× Platinum; NVPI: Gold	Non-album singles
"Solo Dance"	2016	7	40	14	60	14	20	7	7	17	7	IFPI DEN: 3× Platinum; BPI: 2× Platinum; BVMI: Platinum; GLF: 8× Platinum; IFPI NOR: 4× Platinum; SNEP: Platinum	Non-album singles
"Middle of the Night" (with the Vamps)	2017	—	—	—	—	—	—	—	—	—	44	BPI: Silver	Night & Day (Night Edition)
"Wait" (featuring Loote)	2017	32	—	—	—	—	—	—	45	—	—	GLF: Platinum; IFPI NOR: Gold	Non-album singles
"Pull Up"	2018	—	—	—	—	—	—	—	—	—	—		Non-album singles
"16 Steps" (with Olivia Holt)	2018	—	—	—	—	—	—	—	—	—	—		Non-album singles
"Rio"	2018	—	—	—	—	—	—	—	—	—	—		Non-album singles
"Djoba" (with Dolf)	2018	—	—	—	—	—	—	—	—	—	—		Non-album singles
"Osaki"	2018	—	—	—	—	—	—	—	—	—	—		Non-album singles
"Valhalla" (with Faustix)	2018	—	—	—	—	—	—	—	—	—	—		Non-album singles
"Rio"	2018	—	—	—	—	—	—	—	—	—	—		Non-album singles
"16 Steps" (with Olivia Holt and Yxng Bane)	2018	—	—	—	—	—	—	—	—	—	—		Non-album singles
"Somebody I'm Not" (featuring Bjørnskov)	2018	—	—	—	—	—	—	—	— (Note: "Somebody I'm Not" did not enter the Swedish Singellista Chart, but peaked at number 11 on the Swedish Heatseeker Chart.)	—	—	IFPI DEN: Gold; GLF: Gold	Non-album singles
"Nobody" (with James Arthur)	2019	—	—	—	—	—	—	—	73	87	52	IFPI DEN: Gold; BPI: Silver; GLF: Gold; IFPI NOR: Gold	Non-album singles
"Rubber Bands" (with Timmy Trumpet)	2019	—	—	—	—	—	—	—	—	—	—		Non-album singles
"Louder"	2019	—	—	—	—	—	—	—	—	—	—		Non-album singles
"I Could Get Used to This" (with Malte Ebert)	2019	36	—	—	—	—	—	—	— (Note: "I Could Get Used to This" did not enter the Swedish Singellista Chart, but peaked at number three on the Swedish Heatseeker Chart.)	—	—		Non-album singles
"Carry On" (with Molow)	2020	—	—	—	—	—	—	—	—	—	—		Non-album singles
"I’m Just Feelin' (Du Du Du)" (with Imanbek)	2020	—	—	—	—	—	—	—	99	—	—	IFPI DEN: Gold; GLF: Gold	Non-album singles
"Don't Cry for Me" (with Alok and Jason Derulo)	2020	—	—	—	—	—	—	—	91	90	—		Non-album singles
"At Least I Had Fun" (with Rani)	2020	—	—	—	—	—	—	—	—	—	—		Non-album singles
"Running Back to You" (with Nico Santos and Alle Farben)	2020	—	—	—	—	80	—	—	—	—	—		Non-album singles
"2019" (with Georgia Ku)	2021	—	—	—	—	—	—	—	—	—	—		Non-album singles
"Make My Mind Go" (with Rompasso, Faulhaber, and Jonasu)	2021	—	—	—	—	—	—	—	—	—	—		Non-album singles
"Greece 2021" (with W&W featuring Linnea Schössow)	2021	—	—	—	—	—	—	—	—	—	—		Non-album singles
"Can't Come to the Phone" (with Amber Van Day and NFI)	2021	—	—	—	—	—	—	—	—	—	—		Non-album singles
"Running" (with Cheat Codes and Theresa Rex)	2022	—	—	—	—	—	—	—	—	—	—		Hellraisers, Pt. 3
"Days Like This" (with Jay Sean)	2023	—	—	—	—	—	—	—	—	—	—		
"Unwanted" (with Sam Feldt and Conor Maynard)	2023	—	—	—	—	—	—	—	—	—	—		
"Harry Styles"	2023	—	—	—	—	—	—	—	—	—	—		
"—" denotes a single that did not chart or was not released.

=== Remixes ===
- 2019: Declan J Donovan — "Vienna" (Martin Jensen Remix)
- 2020: Kid Cudi — "Day 'n' Nite" (Martin Jensen Edit)
- 2020: Giiants x Maylyn — "Yellow" (Martin Jensen Edit)
- 2020: Gabry Ponte — "Give My All" (Martin Jensen Edit)
