= Holly H =

British social media personality and singer

- Born: Holly Hubert; 17 October 1996 (age 30); Guernsey, Channel Islands
- Occupations: Social media personality, singer
- Years active: 2015–present
- Known for: TikTok, music

Holly H (born Holly Hubert, 17 October 1996) is a British social media personality, content creator and singer. She is best known for her comedic and lifestyle videos on TikTok, where she has amassed over 15 million followers, making her one of the platform's biggest and earliest prominent UK creators. In 2025, she launched her music career with the release of her debut single Tokyo, which was featured on BBC Introducing.

== Early life ==
Holly Hubert was born on 17 October 1996 in Guernsey, Channel Islands. She grew up with her mum and siblings, developing an early interest in performance, creativity and digital media.

== Career ==
=== Social media ===
As a teenager, Holly began posting content on platforms such as Vine and Musical.ly, before transitioning to TikTok in its early stages. She has spoken about her anxiety being a huge drive for creating on social media. Her short-form videos, known for humour, energy and authenticity, helped her become one of the UK's most-followed TikTok creators.

She later expanded to Instagram, Snapchat and YouTube, where she uploads comedy skits, lifestyle content and vlogs. She has collaborated with major brands including Coca-Cola, Samsung, Amazon, Ferragamo, Dolce & Gabbana, Warner Bros. and Sky TV.

=== Music ===
In April 2025, Holly released her debut single Tokyo. The track, described as an upbeat pop anthem with themes of escapism and self-expression, was featured on BBC Introducing.

She has worked with producer Joe Kearns and writers Glen Roberts and Nina Nesbitt.

=== Other ventures ===
Holly has stepped into the acting and broadcasting world on many occasions, with her own episode of Horrible Histories being one of her favourite accomplishments. She has also filmed two episodes of MTV Cribs, appeared on several episodes of Blue Peter, and worked with Nickelodeon. She also made her podcasting debut with Planet Weirdo on Amazon Music, where she talked about her life and interviewed celebrity guests including Shakira and Lauv. In 2020, Holly also attended the Brit Awards as a backstage insider, creating content with some of the biggest names in music.

== Personal life ==
Holly grew up on the island of Guernsey, living with her mother, sister and brother. She attended acting and dancing school. Holly is now based in the United Kingdom. She has spoken publicly about living with anxiety, and often advocates for greater awareness and building a safe community around those who suffer. She has a close relationship with her family, who frequently appear in her content.

== Discography ==
=== Singles ===
- Tokyo (2025)
- I Should Run (2025)

== See also ==
- List of most-followed TikTok accounts
