= Pelle Nylén =

Swedish songwriter and record producer

- Born: Per Harry Nylén; 4 February 1965 (age 60); Gävle, Sweden
- Occupations: music producer, songwriter
- Instrument: guitar
- Formerly of: Modesty

Per Harry Nylén, better known as Pelle Nylén, born 4 February 1965 in Gävle, is a Swedish music producer and songwriter. He previously played guitar in the band Modesty in the 1980s.

== Songwriting discography ==
2000

- Westlife, "My Love"

2001

- Steps, "Words Are Not Enough"

2002

- Westlife, "Walk Away"

2004

- Hanna Pakarinen, "Don't Hang Up"
- Bellefire, "Sold Out"

2005

- Carrie Underwood, "Inside Your Heaven"
- Bo Bice, "Inside Your Heaven"

2006

- Tobias Regner, "My One Mistake"
- Tobias Regner, "In Your Hands"
- Bryan Rice, "Can't Say I'm Sorry"

2007

- Erik Segerstedt, "Can't Say I'm Sorry"
- Lisa Bund, "If I Lose You"
- Lisa Bund, "Picture Perfect"

2014 Carrie Underwood, Inside Your Heaven US Top Country Albums No 1 (Billboard)
