= Van Tulleken brothers =

The Van Tulleken brothers are twin British doctors and television presenters:

- Chris van Tulleken (born 1978)
- Xand van Tulleken (born 1978)
