= Peter Bjørnskov =

Danish singer and record producer (born 1981)

Peter Bjørnskov, also known as just Bjørnskov, (born in Horsens, Denmark in 1981) is a Danish singer, songwriter and record producer. He is part of the songwriting team Startone Music with Sune Haansbæk and Lene Dissing. He has also released solo singles. He was previously part of the Danish band Neeva.

== In Neeva ==
He started his career as a drummer in the Danish pop rock band Neeva, with Kenneth Potempa as the lead singer. The band released its first album, Where to Start, on 22 September 2008 and had a radio hit with "Star of Me".

== Songwriter and producer ==
Bjørnskov has written many songs for a number of artists that took part in the Dansk Melodi Grand Prix as follows:

- 2010: "Breathing" sung by Bryan Rice (lyrics and music by Bjørnskov)
- 2011: "Sleepless" sung by Anne Noa (co-written by Bjørnskov, John Gordon and Lene Dissing)
- 2012: "Reach for the Sky" sung by Kenneth Potempa (co-written by Bjørnskov and Lene Dissing and Sune Haansbæk
- 2013: "Unbreakable" sung by Mohamed Ali (co-written by Bjørnskov and Morten Friis, Michael Parsberg and Lene Dissing)
- 2017: "One" sung by Ida Una (co-written by Bjørnskov and Lene Dissing)

Bjørnskov has also written for Sanne Salomonsen, Ankerstjerne, Kato, Electric Lady Lab, Thomas Ring and The Fireflies.

== Discography ==
=== Albums ===
As part of Neeva

- 2008: Where to Start

Solo

Year	Album	Peak positions	Certification
Year	Album	DEN	Certification
2014	Nu	15	

=== Singles ===
Solo

Year	Single	Peak positions	Album
Year	Single	DEN	Album
2012	"En anden"	–	
2013	"Lysår"	–	
2013	"Vi er helte"	40	
2014	"Usynlig"	–	
2014	"Venner for evigt"		

Featured in

Year	Single	Peak positions	Album
Year	Single	DEN	Album
2011	"Nattog" (Ankerstjerne featuring Bjørnskov)	8	
2013	"Dimitto (Let Go)" (Kato and Safri Duo featuring Bjørnskov)	1	
