= List of top 25 singles for 1994 in Australia =

Top 25 singles of 1994 < 1993 1995 >

Other Australian top charts for 1994
- top 25 albums
- Triple J Hottest 100

Australian number-one charts of 1994
- albums
- singles

The following lists the top 100 singles of 1994 in Australia from the Australian Recording Industry Association (ARIA) End of Year Singles Chart.

#	Title	Artist	Highest pos. reached	Weeks at No. 1
1.	"Love Is All Around"	Wet Wet Wet	1	6
2.	"I Swear"	All-4-One	1	5
3.	"Always"	Bon Jovi	2	(Note: "Always" entered the ARIA Top 50 singles chart in October 1994 and peaked at #2 for seven weeks, it was in the Top 50 for a total of 23 weeks.)
4.	"It's Alright"	East 17	1	7
5.	"The Sign"	Ace of Base	1	4
6.	"The Power of Love"	Céline Dion	1	1
7.	"I'll Make Love to You"	Boyz II Men	1	2
8.	"Please Forgive Me"	Bryan Adams	1	3 (Note: "Please Forgive Me" entered the ARIA Top 50 singles chart in November 1993 and peaked at #1 for four weeks to January 1994 and remained in the Top 50 until March for a total of 18 weeks.)
9.	"Tomorrow"	Silverchair	1	6 (Note: "Tomorrow" entered the ARIA Top 50 singles chart in October 1994 and peaked at #1 for six weeks to December and remained in the Top 50 until April 1995 for a total of 24 weeks.)
10.	"All for Love"	Bryan Adams, Rod Stewart & Sting	1	1
11.	"100% Pure Love"	Crystal Waters	2	
12.	"Slave to the Music"	Twenty 4 Seven	2	
13.	"Give It Up"	Cut 'N' Move	1	4
14.	"Mmm Mmm Mmm Mmm"	Crash Test Dummies	1	3
15.	"Shoop"	Salt-N-Pepa	2	
16.	"Without You"	Mariah Carey	3	
17.	"Swamp Thing"	The Grid	3	
18.	"Right in the Night (Fall in Love with Music)"	Jam & Spoon	2	
19.	"Baby, I Love Your Way"	Big Mountain	4	
20.	"Breathe Again"	Toni Braxton	2	
21.	"Moving On Up"	M People	4	
22.	"Confide in Me"	Kylie Minogue	1	4
23.	"The Most Beautiful Girl in the World"	Symbol	1	2
24.	"Whatta Man"	Salt-N-Pepa	2	
25.	"Sing Hallelujah"	Dr. Alban	5	
26.	"Asshole"	Denis Leary	2	
27.	"Endless Love"	Luther Vandross with Mariah Carey	2	
28.	"Can You Feel the Love Tonight"	Elton John	9	
29.	"7 Seconds"	Youssou N'Dour and Neneh Cherry	3	
30.	"Chains"	Tina Arena	4	
31.	"Said I Loved You...But I Lied"	Michael Bolton	2	
32.	"Things Can Only Get Better"	D:Ream	9	
33.	"Dum Da Dum"	Melodie MC	5	
34.	"All I Wanna Do"	Sheryl Crow	1	1
35.	"Stay (I Missed You)"	Lisa Loeb & Nine Stories	6	
36.	"Boom! Shake the Room"	Jazzy Jeff & The Fresh Prince	1	1
37.	"Stay"	Eternal	3	
38.	"Zombie"	The Cranberries	1	7
39.	"Streets of Philadelphia"	Bruce Springsteen	4	
40.	"I Like to Move It"	Reel 2 Real	6	
41.	"I'll Remember"	Madonna	7	
42.	"Feelin' Alright"	E.Y.C.	7	
43.	"The Rhythm of the Night"	Corona	8	
44.	"Doop"	Doop	5	
45.	"I'll Stand by You"	The Pretenders	8	
46.	"Secret"	Madonna	5	
47.	"Regulate"	Warren G and Nate Dogg	16	
48.	"Hey Mr. D.J."	Zhané	9	
49.	"Son of a Gun"	JX	6	
50.	"Can We Talk"	Tevin Campbell	12	
51.	"Animal"	Pearl Jam	30	
52.	"I Love the Nightlife (Disco 'Round)"	Alicia Bridges	11	
53.	"Rockin' for Myself"	Motiv 8	9	
54.	"Come Out and Play"	The Offspring	8	
55.	"Somebody Dance with Me"	DJ BoBo	13	
56.	"Mountain"	Chocolate Starfish	12	
57.	"Absolutely Fabulous"	Pet Shop Boys	2	
58.	"Do You Wanna Get Funky"	C+C Music Factory	11	
59.	"Hero"	Mariah Carey	7	
60.	"The Power of Love"	Beverly	16	
61.	"What's My Name?"	Snoop Dogg	13	
62.	"Black Hole Sun"	Soundgarden	6	
63.	Lonely (EP)	Frente!	7	
64.	"Around the World"	East 17	4	
65.	"Shine"	Collective Soul	8	
66.	"Whoomp! (There It Is)"	Tag Team	19	
67.	"All That She Wants"	Ace of Base	1	3
68.	"Jessie"	Joshua Kadison	15	
69.	"You Gotta Be"	Des'ree	9	
70.	"Loser"	Beck	8	
71.	"Feel Like Making Love"	Pauline Henry	13	
72.	"I Can See Clearly Now"	Jimmy Cliff	17	
73.	"I Believe"	Marcella Detroit	10	
74.	"Is It Love"	Twenty 4 Seven	20	
75.	"Feels Like Heaven"	Urban Cookie Collective	10	
76.	"Twist and Shout"	Chaka Demus & Pliers with Jack Radics and Taxi Gang	13	
77.	"Shaka Jam"	Kulcha	7	
78.	"Anything"	Culture Beat	12	
79.	"Ain't Nobody"	Jaki Graham	17	
80.	"Mr. Jones"	Counting Crows	13	
81.	"Hey DJ"	A Lighter Shade of Brown	12	
82.	"Helping Hand"	The Screaming Jets	25	
83.	"Pray"	Take That	10	
84.	"Return to Innocence"	Enigma	16	
85.	"No Rain"	Blind Melon	8	
86.	"U R the Best Thing"	D:Ream	9	
87.	"Closer"	Nine Inch Nails	3	
88.	"Disarm"	The Smashing Pumpkins	16	
89.	"Dreams"	Gabrielle	2	
90.	"Don't Be Shy"	Kulcha	13	
91.	"Daughter"	Pearl Jam	18	
92.	"Turn the Beat Around"	Gloria Estefan	8	
93.	"Hip Hop Holiday"	3 the Hard Way	17	
94.	"Creep"	Radiohead	6	
95.	"Don't Turn Around"	Ace of Base	19	
96.	"Spin the Black Circle"	Pearl Jam	3	
97.	"Cornflake Girl"	Tori Amos	19	
98.	"Will You Be There (In the Morning)"	Heart	24	
99.	"Hands Out of My Pocket"	Cold Chisel	9	
100.	"Got to Get It"	Culture Beat	7	

Peak chart positions are from the ARIA Charts, overall position on the End of Year Chart is calculated by ARIA based on the number of weeks and position that the records reach within the Top 50 singles for each week during 1994.
