= Let Me Love You =

Let Me Love You may refer to:

== Albums ==
- Let Me Love You, a 1976 album by Mark Holden

== Songs ==
- "Let Me Love You" (Ariana Grande song), 2016 song featuring Lil Wayne
- "Let Me Love You" (DJ Rebel and Mohombi song), 2016 song featuring Shaggy
- "Let Me Love You" (DJ Snake song), 2016 song featuring Justin Bieber
- "Let Me Love You" (Junggigo and Chanyeol song), 2017 song by Junggigo and Chanyeol
- "Let Me Love You" (Mario song), 2004
- "Let Me Love You" (Tamara Todevska, Vrčak and Adrijan Gaxha song), Macedonian entry for the Eurovision Song Contest 2008
- "Let Me Love You (Until You Learn to Love Yourself)", 2012 song by Ne-Yo
- "Let Me Love You", song by Da Buzz from their 2000 album Da Sound
- "Let Me Love You", song by II D Extreme from their 2003 album II
- "Let Me Love You", 1964 song by B.B. King
- "Let Me Love You", 1983 song by Beres Hammond
- "Let Me Love You", 1964 song by Bobby Rush
- "Let Me Love You", 1956 song by Boyd Bennett and His Rockets
- "Let Me Love You", 1981 song by Bunny Mack
- "Let Me Love You", 2000 song by Da Buzz
- "Let Me Love You", 1980 song by Dennis Brown
- "Let Me Love You", 1975 song by Ernie K-Doe
- "Let Me Love You", 1980 song by Fred Knoblock
- "Let Me Love You", 1997 song by George Nooks
- "Let Me Love You", 1999 song by Geri Halliwell
- "Let Me Love You", 1968 song by Jackie Edwards and Soulmaker's
- "Let Me Love You", 1987 song by James D-Train Williams
- "Let Me Love You", 1972 song by Jesse James and the James Boys
- "Let Me Love You", 1965 song by Jimmy Young
- "Let Me Love You", 1952 song by Bart Howard
- "Let Me Love You", 1990 song by King Size Taylor
- "Let Me Love You", 2018 song by Kobra and the Lotus
- "Let Me Love You", 1994 song by Lalah Hathaway
- "Let Me Love You", 1952 song by Lee Bell
- "Let Me Love You", 1983 song by Leroy Smart
- "Let Me Love You", 1960 song by Marv Johnson
- "Let Me Love You", 1978 song by Michael Henderson
- "Let Me Love You", 1986 song by The Milkshakes
- "Let Me Love You", 1970 song by Mornin'
- "Let Me Love You", 1966 song by New Colony Six
- "Let Me Love You", 1966 song by Oliver Bond
- "Let Me Love You", 1974 song by Ralph Graham
- "Let Me Love You", 1969 song by Ray Charles
- "Let Me Love You", 1973 song by Slim Smith
- "Let Me Love You", 1954 song by Tommy Collins
- "Let Me Love You", 1968 song by Troy Shondell
- "Let Me Love You", 1981 song by the Zorros

== See also ==
- "Let You Love Me", a 2018 song by Rita Ora
