= Slave to the Music =

Slave to the Music may refer to:

- Slave to the Music (album), an album by Twenty 4 Seven
- "Slave to the Music" (Twenty 4 Seven song)
- "Slave to the Music" (James Morrison song)
