= Leave Them Alone =

- CD maxi - Netherlands

Single by Twenty 4 Seven

from the album Slave to the Music
- Released: 30 June 1994
- Recorded: 1993
- Genre: Eurodance
- Length: 3:36 (rap nix); 3:46 (album version)
- Label: CNR Music; Possum; ZYX Records
- Songwriter: Ruud van Rijen
- Producer: Ruud van Rijen

Twenty 4 Seven singles chronology
"Take Me Away" (1994)	"Leave Them Alone" (1994)	"Oh Baby" (1994)

Music video
- "Leave Them Alone" on YouTube

"Leave Them Alone" is a song by Dutch Eurodance band Twenty 4 Seven, released in June 1994, by CNR, Possum and ZYX Records, as the fourth and last single from their second album, Slave to the Music (1993). The song is written by its producer Ruud van Rijen and was the last song by the band to reach the top 10 in their native Netherlands, peaking at number nine. It was also a top-10 hit in Spain and a top-20 hit in Denmark and Finland. In the US, "Leave Them Alone" was released in the US instead of "Is It Love" and "Take Me Away". The album version is sung by band member Stay-C, but on the single mix, he performs the rap part. The accompanying music video was filmed in Bavaria Filmstudio in Munich, Germany and a forest nearby. The single also included a Greatest Hits Mega-mix and a '94 version of "I Can't Stand It!".

== Track listing ==
=== CD maxi ===
- Netherlands
1. "Leave Them Alone" (Rap Single Mix) – 3:34
2. "Leave Them Alone" (RVR Long Version Rap) – 4:30
3. I Can't Stand It '94" (The 1994 Remake) – 5:19
4. "Greatest Hits Megamix" – 13:15
5. "Slave to the Music" (Ferry & Garnefsky Club Mix) – 5:02
6. "Is It Love" (Dancability Club Mix) – 5:04
7. "Take Me Away" (E & M Club Mix) – 5:03
8. "Leave Them Alone" (RVR Version) – 4:05
- Germany
1. "Leave Them Alone" (Factory Team Remix) – 5:50
2. "Leave Them Alone" (Factory Club Edit) – 5:52
3. "Leave Them Alone" (Factory Spanish Remix) – 5:40
4. "Leave Them Alone" (Radio Edit) – 4:15
5. "Leave Them Alone" (El Tzigano) – 5:38
- Australia
1. "Leave Them Alone" (Rap Single Mix) – 3:34
2. "Leave Them Alone" (RVR Long Version Rap) – 4:30
3. "I Can't Stand It '94" (The 1994 Remake) – 5:19
4. "Greatest Hits Megamix" – 13:15
5. "Slave to the Music" (Ferry & Garnefsky Club Mix) – 5:02
6. "Is It Love" (Dancability Club Mix) – 5:04
7. "Take Me Away" (E & M Club Mix) – 5:03
8. "Leave Them Alone" (RVR Version) – 4:05

=== CD maxi ===
- US
1. "Leave Them Alone" (Album Version) – 3:59
2. "Leave Them Alone" (Rap Single Mix) – 3:30
3. "Leave Them Alone" (RVR Long Version Rap) – 4:25
4. "Leave Them Alone" (Factory Team Remix) – 5:45
5. "Leave Them Alone" (Factory Spanish Remix) – 5:38
6. "Keep On Goin'" – 3:56

=== Greatest Hits Megamix ===
1. "Slave to the Music" (Ferry & Garnefsky Mix) – 3:09
2. "Is It Love" (Dancability Club Mix) – 3:20
3. "Take Me Away" (E & M Club Mix) – 2:58
4. "Leave Them Alone" (RVR Version) – 3:33

=== CD single ===
- Netherlands
1. "Leave Them Alone" (Rap Single Mix) – 3:34
2. "Leave Them Alone" (Album Version) – 3:46
- France
1. "Leave Them Alone" (Rap Single Mix) – 3:34
2. "Leave Them Alone" (Album Version) – 3:46

=== 12" vinyl ===
- Italy
1. "Leave Them Alone" (Factory Club Edit) – 5:52
2. "Leave Them Alone" (Factory Team Remix) – 5:50
3. "Leave Them Alone" (Factory Spanish Remix) – 5:40
4. "Leave Them Alone" (Radio Edit) – 4:15
5. "Leave Them Alone" (El Tzigano) – 5:38

== Charts ==
=== Weekly charts ===
Weekly chart performance for "Leave Them Alone"
Chart (1994)	Peak position
Australia (ARIA)	89
Austria (Ö3 Austria Top 40)	23
Belgium (Ultratop 50 Flanders)	41
Denmark (IFPI)	12
Europe (European Hot 100 Singles)	48
Europe (Eurochart Hot 100)	39
Finland (Suomen virallinen lista)	17
Germany (GfK)	36
Netherlands (Dutch Top 40)	13
Netherlands (Single Top 100)	9
Spain (ALEF MB)	6
Sweden (Sverigetopplistan)	34
US Bubbling Under Hot 100 Singles (Billboard)	11
US Hot Dance Music/Maxi-Singles Sales (Billboard)	42

=== Year-end charts ===
Year-end chart performance for "Leave Them Alone"
Chart (1994)	Position
Austria (Ö3 Austria Top 40)	27
Belgium (VRT Top 30 Flanders)	42
Europe (European Hot 100 Singles)	68
Germany (Media Control Charts)	99
Netherlands (Dutch Top 40)	98
Netherlands (Single Top 100)	86
Sweden (Sverigetopplistan)	37
