= Slave to the Music (album) =

Studio album by Twenty 4 Seven
- Released: 22 November 1993
- Recorded: 1992–1993
- Label: Indisc; ZYX Music; Possum
- Producer: Ruud van Rijen

Twenty 4 Seven chronology
Street Moves (1990)	Slave to the Music (1993)	I Wanna Show You (1994)

Singles from Slave to the Music
- 1. "Slave to the Music" Released: 13 August 1993; 2. "Is It Love" Released: 14 November 1993; 3. "Take Me Away" Released: 28 February 1994; 4. "Leave Them Alone" Released: 30 June 1994

Slave to the Music is the second album by Twenty 4 Seven, featuring Nancy Coolen & Stay-C. It was released on November 22, 1993, by Indisc & ZYX Music. The album was successful across Europe and Australasia. The Album received several gold and platinum records in most of the countries where it was marketed and released.

Four singles were released from this record: "Slave to the Music", "Is It Love", "Take Me Away", and "Leave Them Alone".

== Track listing ==
1. "Slave to the Music" – 4:03
2. "Is It Love" – 3:55
3. "Take Me Away" – 3:36
4. "Keep On Goin'" – 3:59
5. "Music Is My Life" – 4:08
6. "Leave Them Alone" – 4:01
7. "What Time Is It" – 4:13
8. "Take Your Chance" – 3:35
9. "Let's Stay" – 4:03
10. "Slave to the Music" (Ferry & Garnefski Club Mix) – 5:02
11. "Is It Love" (Dancability Club Mix) – 5:09

== Personnel ==
- Ruud van Rijen – arrangements, producer, composer
- William Rutten – photography
- Stay-C – rap vocals, composer
- Nancy Coolen – vocals

== Charts ==
=== Weekly charts ===
Weekly chart performance for Slave to the Music
Chart (1993–1994)	Peak position
Australian Albums (ARIA)	79
Austrian Albums (Ö3 Austria)	30
Dutch Albums (Album Top 100)	22
German Albums (Offizielle Top 100)	15
Hungarian Albums (MAHASZ)	28
Swedish Albums (Sverigetopplistan)	17

=== Year-end charts ===
Year-end chart performance for Slave to the Music
Chart (1994)	Position
Dutch Albums (Album Top 100)	50
German Albums (Offizielle Top 100)	63

== Certifications ==
Certifications for Slave to the Music
Country	Certification	Date	Sales certified
Czech Republic	Platinum	1994	12,000
Netherlands (NVPI)	Gold	1993	25,000
South Africa (RISA)	2× Platinum	17 February 1994	20,000
