= If You Want My Love (disambiguation) =

"If You Want My Love" is a 1982 song by Cheap Trick.

If You Want My Love or similar may also refer to:

- "If You Want My Love", a song by Bob Dylan from The Bootleg Series Vol. 12: The Cutting Edge 1965–1966
- "If You Want my Love", a song by Change from Turn on Your Radio, 1985
- "If You Want My Love", a song by Little Mix from Confetti, 2020
- "If You Want My Love" (Twenty 4 Seven song), 1997
- "(If You Want My Love) Put Something Down On It", a song by Bobby Womack from the 1975 album I Don't Know What the World Is Coming To
- "If You Want My Lovin'", a 1981 song by Evelyn "Champagne" King
- "If You Still Want My Love", a 2017 song by Cheap Trick from We're All Alright!
