= We Are the World (disambiguation) =

"We Are the World" is a 1985 song and charity single originally recorded by the supergroup USA for Africa.

We Are the World may also refer to:

- We Are the World (album), a 1985 album by USA for Africa that includes the single
- "We Are the World" (Twenty 4 Seven song) (1996)

== See also ==
- "Somos El Mundo 25 Por Haiti", a 2010 Spanish-language song and charity single recorded by the Latin supergroup Artists for Haiti
- "We Are the World 25 for Haiti", a 2010 charity single by the supergroup Artists for Haiti
- "We Are the World 25 for Haiti" (YouTube edition), a 2010 charity song and video by 57 YouTube musicians
