= I Wanna Show You =

Studio album by Twenty 4 Seven
- Released: 1994
- Label: CNR Music 2001680, ZYX MusicZYX 20324-2
- Producer: Ruud van Rijen

Twenty 4 Seven chronology
Slave to the Music (1993)	I Wanna Show You (1994)	Twenty 4 Hours A Day, Seven Days A Week (1997)

Singles from I Wanna Show You
- 1. "Oh Baby" Released: 15 October 1994; 2. "Keep on Tryin'" Released: 8 May 1995

I Wanna Show You is the third studio album by the Dutch group Twenty 4 Seven. It was released in December 1994 by CNR Music. The group received the Dutch Export Award of 1994 for this record. In 1996, the album also received a Golden Award in South Africa. It reached its highest position at №1 in the (RiSA) South African Album Charts. The album was released in Asia, Netherlands, Czech Republic, Hungary, Poland, Germany, Belarus, Russia, Brazil, Romania, Taiwan, South Africa and Australia. The album was not released in the United Kingdom.

Two singles were released from this album: "Oh Baby" and "Keep on Tryin'".

== Track listing ==
CD Album

1. "Intro" — 2:39
2. "Gimme More" — 4:40
3. "Keep on Tryin'" — 4:30
4. "I Wanna Show You" — 4:49
5. "On The Playground" — 0:28
6. "Paradise" — 4:54
7. "Breakin' Up" — 4:13
8. "Oh Baby! (Album-Version)" — 5:24
9. "Words Of Wisdom" — 0:33
10. "You Gotta Be Safe" — 3:44
11. "Runaway" — 4:18
12. "Oh Baby! (Atlantic Ocean Dance Mix)" — 5:07

== Charts ==
Chart (1994/1995)	Peak position
South Africa (RiSA)	1
Germany (Media Control Charts)	66
Netherlands (Dutch Top 40)	64
Switzerland (Schweizer Hitparade)	31

=== Certifications ===
Country	Certification	Date	Sales certified
South Africa (RiSA)	Gold	1 April 1996	40,000

== Credits ==
- Recorded at Ruud van Rijen Music Studio
- Rap – Stay-C
- Vocals – Nancy Coolen
- Produced and engineered by Ruud van Rijen for RVR Productions
