= Last Goodbye (Da Buzz song) =

Single by Da Buzz

from the album Last Goodbye
- Released: 22 February 2006
- Genre: Dance, pop
- Length: 3:15
- Label: Bonnier
- Songwriter(s): Per Lidén
- Producer(s): Deelay

Da Buzz singles chronology
"Come Away with Me" (2004)	"Last Goodbye" (2006)	"Without Breaking" (2006)

"Last Goodbye" is a song by Swedish band Da Buzz. It reached number one on the Swedish Singles Chart on 9 March 2006. It is the first single from the album of the same name and was released as a three track CD single by Bonnier Music on 22 February 2006.

== Track listing ==
1. "Last Goodbye" (Radio Edit) – 3:15
2. "Last Goodbye" (von der Burg Radio Edit) – 3:13
3. "Last Goodbye" (von der Burg Extended) – 5:00

== Charts ==
=== Weekly charts ===
Chart (2006)	Peak position
Sweden (Sverigetopplistan)	1

=== Year-end charts ===
Chart (2006)	Position
Sweden (Sverigetopplistan)	60
