= Keep On Tryin' =

- CD maxi - Germany

Single by Twenty 4 Seven

from the album I Wanna Show You
- Released: 8 May 1995
- Recorded: 1994
- Studio: Ruud van Rijen Music Studio
- Length: 3:48
- Label: CNR Music; ZYX Music; Possum
- Songwriter: Ruud van Rijen
- Producer: Ruud van Rijen

Twenty 4 Seven singles chronology
| "Oh Baby" (1994) | "Keep On Tryin'" (1995) | "We Are the World" (1996) |

Music video
- "Keep On Tryin'" on YouTube

"Keep On Tryin'" is a song recorded by Dutch band Twenty 4 Seven. It is written and produced by Ruud van Rijen and released in May 1995, by labels CNR, ZYX and Possum, as the second single from their third album, I Wanna Show You (1994). The song is also their final single to feature Nancy Coolen and Stay-C as vocalists, and was primarily successful in Benelux, where the single reached 29 on the Dutch singles chart, as well as number 32 in Belgium. It did not chart in the United Kingdom and a studio video was not filmed for the track.

== Track listings ==
- 12-inch vinyl, France (1995)

A1. "Keep On Tryin'" (RVR Long Version) — 6:04
A2. "Keep On Tryin'" (Ben Liebrand Mix - With Rap) — 6:00
A3. "Keep On Tryin'" (Instrumental) — 3:46
B1. "Keep On Tryin'" (Ben Liebrand Mix - Without Rap) — 6:00
B2. "Keep On Tryin'" (Single Mix) — 3:48

- CD single, Benelux (1995)
1. "Keep On Tryin'" (Single Mix) — 3:48
2. "Keep On Tryin'" (Instrumental) — 3:46
- CD maxi-single, Benelux (1995)
1. "Keep On Tryin'" (Single Mix) — 3:48
2. "Keep On Tryin'" (Ben Liebrand Mix - With Rap) — 6:00
3. "Keep On Tryin'" (RVR Long Version) — 6:04
4. "Keep On Tryin'" (Ben Liebrand Mix - Without Rap) — 6:00
5. "Keep On Tryin'" (Instrumental) — 3:46

== Charts ==
| Chart (1995) | Peak position |
|---|---|
| Australia (ARIA) | 189 |
| Belgium (Ultratop 50 Flanders) | 32 |
| Netherlands (Dutch Top 40) | 31 |
| Netherlands (Single Top 100) | 29 |
