= Twenty 4 Seven =

Dutch Eurodance group

- Nance Jacks & Hanks

Background information
- Origin: Netherlands
- Genre: Eurodance
- Years active: 1989–1991, 1993–present
- Label: BCM Records BMG
- Members: Ruud van Rijen; Giovanni Falco (Hanks); Wolfgang Reis (Jacks); Nancy "Nance" Coolen
- Past members: Stacey Seedorf (Stay-C); Li-Ann; Kelly Overett; Tony Dawson-Harrison (Captain Hollywood); Stella; Elle; Sharon Doorson (Miss Cherry); Ricardo Overman (MC Fixxit)

Twenty 4 Seven is a Dutch Eurodance group formed in 1989 by Dutch producer Ruud van Rijen. The project is best known in Europe for the hit singles "I Can't Stand It", "Are You Dreaming?", "Slave to the Music", "Is It Love" and "Take Me Away."

== History ==
=== 1989-1990: Original lineup ===
Original Street Moves cover art (1989)

Twenty 4 Seven was formed in 1989 by Dutch producer Ruud van Rijen in Valkenswaard, The Netherlands. In the beginning stages, the project consisted of Dutch singer Nancy "Nance" Coolen and Dutch rapper Ricardo Overman (MC Fixxit). The single "I Can't Stand It" was released early in 1989 featuring vocals from Coolen and Overman. After having internal disputes with van Rijen, Overman left the team shortly after the release of the debut single. In response to Overman's departure from the act, Tony Dawson-Harrison (Captain Hollywood) was asked to become the new front man and rapper of the project. Dancers Giovanni Falco (Hanks) and Wolfgang Reiss (Jacks) were friends from Harrison and joined the act alongside himself and Coolen. The project name was also modified to "Twenty 4 Seven featuring Captain Hollywood."' The group's innovative new mixture of traditional male raps and female singing choruses proved to be a massive success across Europe. "I Can't Stand It" charted at No.3 in Israel and at No.7 in the United Kingdom. The next single, "Are You Dreaming?" charted at No. 17 in the United Kingdom. In 1990, Street Moves, the project's debut album was released.

By 1991, Harrison had left the project to continue developing his own music project called Captain Hollywood Project. Despite Harrison's departure from the project, the popularity "I Can't Stand It" continued throughout Europe. The single was later chosen to be a part of film soundtrack for the 1991 film Dying Young starring Julia Roberts. After Harrison's departure, Twenty 4 Seven remained dormant for two years.

=== 1993-1994: Slave to the Music & I Wanna Show You ===
In 1993, Dutch rapper/singer Stacey Seedorf (Stay-C) was recruited into the act as a replacement for Harrison. The singles "Slave To the Music" "Is It Love", "Take Me Away", "Leave Them Alone" and the album Slave to the Music were released.

After the success of Is It Love, the band quickly capitalized on their success by readying material for another new album. In 1994, "Oh Baby!" and "Keep on Tryin'" were released, Although the singles did not chart in the United Kingdom, where they had experienced large success before, the band continued its success throughout the rest of Europe. After both singles were released, the band released I Wanna Show You, their third studio album, in mid-1994. After several live performances across Europe, the band once again went silent, releasing no new material for the next two years.

=== Lineup changes and decline ===
In 1996, the band returned featuring a new female vocalist, Stella, to replace veteran member Nance Coolen, who was replaced due to a dispute with rapper Stay-c. The first single featuring Stella's vocals, "We Are the World", managed to break charts in the Czech Republic and Netherlands, but was unable to continue the band's large success.

In 1997, "If You Want My Love" and "Friday Night" were released, with both songs charting poorly in countries where they had once experienced success. Although the Netherlands remained a constant area of success for the band, interest throughout the rest of Europe had waned considerably. Following a few live performances and the release of the band's fourth studio album, Twenty 4 Hours A Day, Seven Days A Week, Stella left the group, leaving Paton the lone collaborator with van Rijen.

In 1999, the band released "Ne Ne", a brand new single, which failed to enter even the Dutch charts. After three years on the decline, van Rijen finally decided to put the group to rest in late 1999.

=== New faces and sound ===
After nearly a decade of silence, Twenty 4 Seven was revived in 2007 by van Rijen, who had collaborated with vocalist Elle to create a jumpstyle cover of the Berlin song "Like Flames". The song entered the Dutch charts in November at #45, and peaked at #20 in late 2007. Although the group announced they would soon be performing live again, nothing materialized. Following the single's success, Elle left the group.

=== 2010-present: Lineup changes and returning members ===
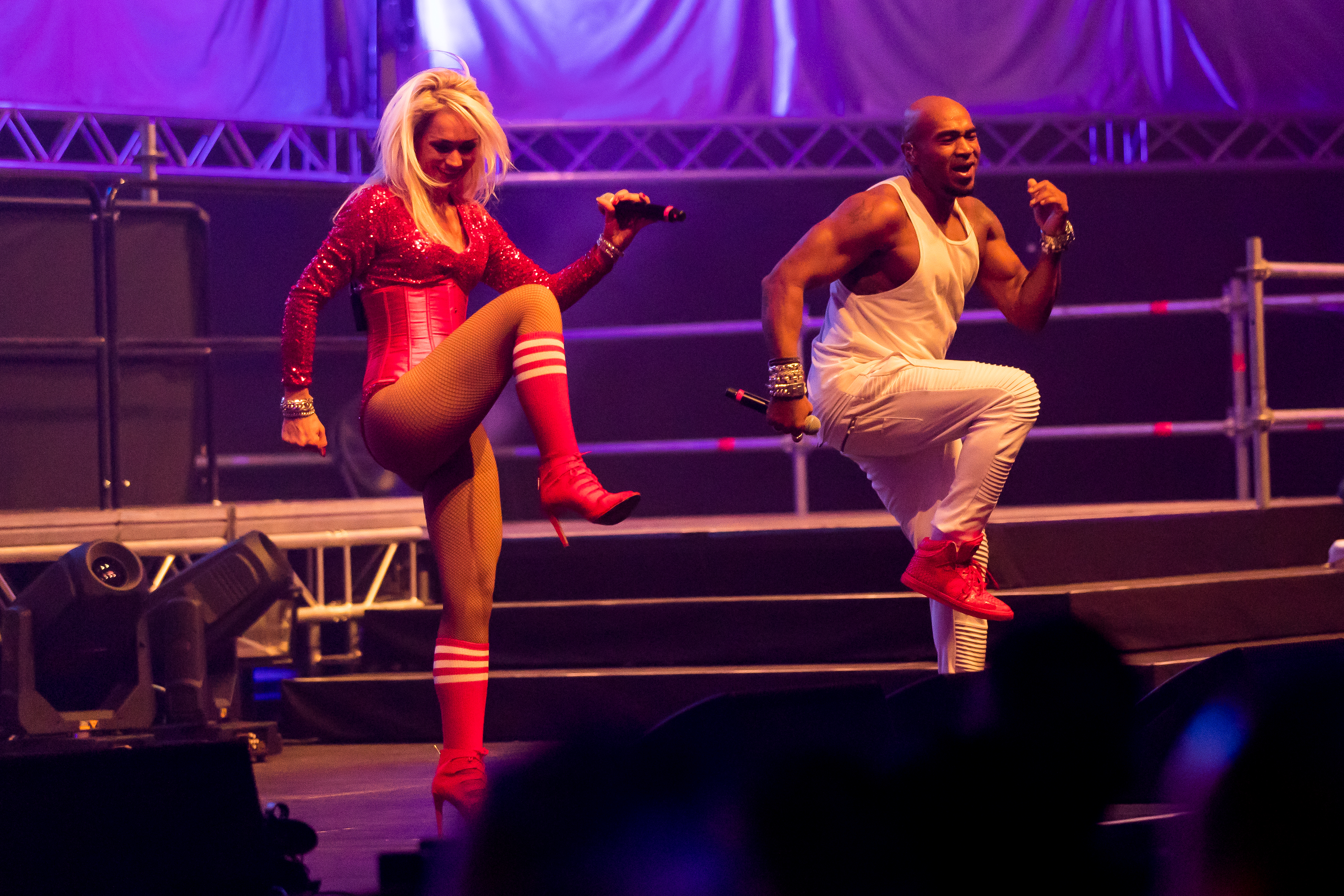
Twenty 4 Seven (2016)

In 2010, van Rijen announced that Stacey Paton had returned to the group, along with two new vocalists, Li Ann (Lianne van Groen) and Miss Cherry (Sharon Doorson). In July 2010, van Rijen announced a brand new version of "Slave to the Music", titled "Slave to the Music 2010", would be released in late 2010. Following the recording of the single, Miss Cherry ended her involvement with the group, which was promptly re-recorded with only Li Ann and Stacey's voices. Although a teaser video was released in December 2010 with a "coming soon" teaser banner, no information about the exact release of the single has been released. A single was released in 2012 titled 'The Reason'. A music video was made for this single. 'The Reason' had some success in the Netherlands, which peaked at #33 in the Dutch charts.

In 2021, the new Twenty 4 Seven single "Do you want me" was released which reunited Ruud van Rijen with the singers/dancers of the group's UK hits (Nance, Jacks & Hanks). The song is a cover of a Eurodance/Europop hit by Swedish band Da Buzz, which got into the Top 10s of Sweden and Norway in 2000. Simultaneously, Stay-C and Li Ann are a lovecouple and have a child together. Nance is performing with Jacks and Hanks since March 2022.

Towards the end of 2022, Twenty 4 Seven announced on their social media accounts that Stay-C would be returning to the group for performances in 2023, alongside former Cappella member Kelly Overett. Two lineups of Twenty 4 Seven existed at this time: One consisting of Nance, Jacks and Hanks, and the second one consisting of Stay-C and Kelly. Both performed similar sets, except Stay-C and Kelly also performed a medley of past Cappella hits.

In May 2023 after their first concert together, Stay-C revealed that he would be retiring after their tour finishes, which concluded in September. Kelly plans to stay active and perform at other 90's revival shows as "Kelly O."

== Discography ==
Twenty 4 Seven discography
- Studio albums: 4
- Singles: 15
- Music videos: 12

=== Studio albums ===
Title	Details	Peak chart positions							Certifications
Title	Details	AUS	AUT	GER	NED	SWE	SWI	UK	Certifications
Street Moves	Release date: November 25, 1990; Label: BCM Records; Formats: CD, Cassette	—	—	—	—	50	25	69	
Slave to the Music	Release date: November 22, 1993; Label: Indisc; Formats: CD, Cassette	79	30	15	22	17	—	—	NVPI: Gold
I Wanna Show You	Release date: December 12, 1994; Label: CNR Music; Formats: CD	—	—	66	64	—	31	—	
Twenty 4 Hours A Day, Seven Days A Week	Release date: September 1997; Label: CNR Music; Formats: CD	—	—	—	—	—	—	—	
"—" denotes a recording that did not chart or was not released in that territory.

=== Singles ===
Year	Single	Peak chart positions										Certifications (sales thresholds)	Album
Year	Single	AUS	AUT	BEL (FL)	EUR	FIN	GER	NED	SWE	SWI	UK	Certifications (sales thresholds)	Album
1989	"I Can't Stand It!"	130	2	38	7	—	3	17	5	2	7		Street Moves
1990	"Are You Dreaming?"	—	22	—	17	6	16	18	—	4	17		Street Moves
1992	"It Could Have Been You"	—	—	—	—	—	—	—	—	—	—		—N/a
1993	"Slave to the Music"	2	—	23	36	7	8	6	4	14	—	ARIA: Platinum; BVMI: Gold	Slave to the Music
1993	"Is It Love"	20	9	11	16	—	5	6	7	24	—	BVMI: Gold	Slave to the Music
1994	"Take Me Away"	52	28	24	25	20	14	11	23	41	—		Slave to the Music
1994	"Leave Them Alone"	89	23	41	48	17	36	9	34	—	—		Slave to the Music
1994	"Oh Baby"	120	—	27	—	—	33	26	—	37	—		I Wanna Show You
1995	"Keep on Tryin'"	189	—	—	—	—	—	29	—	—	—		I Wanna Show You
1996	"We Are the World"	—	—	—	—	—	—	39	—	—	—		Twenty 4 Hours A Day, Seven Days A Week
1997	"If You Want My Love"	—	—	—	—	—	—	77	—	—	—		Twenty 4 Hours A Day, Seven Days A Week
1997	"Friday Night"	—	—	—	—	—	—	—	—	—	—		Twenty 4 Hours A Day, Seven Days A Week
1999	"Ne Ne"	—	—	—	—	—	—	—	—	—	—		Singles only
2007	"Like Flames"	—	—	—	—	—	—	20	—	—	—		Singles only
2012	"The Reason"	—	—	—	—	—	—	33	—	—	—		Singles only
"—" denotes a title that did not chart.

== Other singles ==
=== As Twenty 4th Street ===
Year	Single	Peak positions	Album
Year	Single	Hot Dance Club Play	Album
1991	"I Can't Stand It!"	44	Street Moves

== Music videos ==
This is a list of official music videos for Twenty 4 Seven singles and when they were released.

Year	Single	Director
1989	"I Can't Stand It"	
1990	"Are You Dreaming?"	
1993	"Slave to the Music"	Fernando Garcia
1993	"Is It Love"	Fernando Garcia
1994	"Take Me Away"	Fernando Garcia
1994	"Leave Them Alone"	
1994	"Oh Baby"	Steve Walker
1996	"We Are the World"	Steve Walker
1997	"If You Want My Love"	Steve Walker
1997	"Friday Night"	
2007	"Like Flames"	
2010	"Slave To The Music Reloaded"	
