= We Are the World (Twenty 4 Seven song) =

1996 single by Twenty 4 Seven

- CD single - Netherlands

Single by Twenty 4 Seven

from the album Twenty 4 Hours A Day, Seven Days A Week
- Released: 30 August 1996
- Recorded: 1996
- Length: 3:38
- Label: CNR Music, ToCo International, Transistor Music,
- Songwriters: Twenty 4 Seven; Ruud van Rijen; Stay-C
- Producers: Twenty 4 Seven; Ruud van Rijen

Twenty 4 Seven singles chronology
"Keep on Tryin'" (1995)	"We Are the World" (1996)	"If You Want My Love" (1997)

Music video
- "We Are the World" on YouTube

"We Are the World" is a song recorded by the Dutch group Twenty 4 Seven. It was released in summer 1996 as a single from their fourth studio album Twenty 4 Hours A Day, Seven Days A Week. Vocalist Nance Coolen was replaced by Stella after Nance had left the group. The chorus was sung by Stella and the rap by Stay-C. The video was filmed in Aalsmeer and Amsterdam (The Netherlands) and directed by Steve Walker.

== Track listings ==
CD maxi

1. "We Are The World" (Single Mix) — 3:37
2. "We Are The World" (Generations Mixx) — 4:02
3. "We Are The World" (RVR Long Version) — 5:17
4. "We Are The World" (The World According To Ruyters & Romero Remix) — 4:39
5. "We Are The World" (Dancehall Mixx) — 4:22
6. "We Are The World" (Fijay Valasco Club Mix) — 5:35
7. "We Are The World" (Instrumental World) — 3:37

CD single

1. "We Are The World" (Single Mix) — 3:37
2. "We Are The World" (Instrumental World) — 3:37

=== Vinyl 12" ===
1. "We Are The World" (Single Mix) — 3:37
2. "We Are The World" (Generations Mixx) — 4:02
3. "We Are The World" (RVR Long Version) — 5:17
4. "We Are The World" (The World According To Ruyters & Romero Remix) — 4:39
5. "We Are The World" (Dancehall Mixx) — 4:22
6. "We Are The World" (Fijay Valasco Club Mix) — 5:35
7. "We Are The World" (Instrumental World) — 3:37

== Charts ==
Chart (1996)	Peak position
Germany (Media Control Charts)	67
Netherlands (Dutch Top 40)	33
Netherlands (Single Top 100)	39
Spain (AFYVE)	4
Europe (Eurochart Hot 100)	32
