= Da Sound =

Debut album by swedish dance-pop band Da Buzz

Studio album by Da Buzz
- Released: September 21, 2000
- Genres: Eurodance; Dance-pop
- Label: Edel Records

Da Buzz chronology
Da Sound (2000)	Wanna Be With Me (2002)

Da Sound is the debut album by Swedish dance-pop band Da Buzz. It was released on September 21, 2000 through Edel Records The album peaked at #16 for 10 weeks at the Swedishcharts.

Two singles, "Do You Want Me" and "Let Me Love You", reached the top ten on the Swedish charts, while the latter song became a dance club hit in the U.S., peaking at number four on the Dance Club Play chart in Billboard magazine.

In 2021, Dutch Eurodance act Twenty 4 Seven (essentially producer Ruud van Rijen) covered "Do You Want Me" with TV presenter Nance Coolen on vocals (also the vocalist on many of Twenty 4 Seven's early 1990s hits).

== Track listing ==
1. "Let Me Love You" (3:41)
2. "Do You Want Me" (3:40)
3. "Give You All My Love" (3:53)
4. "Your Love Will (Shine On Me)" (3:41)
5. "Paradise" (3:15)
6. "Tell Me Once Again" (3:27)
7. "Believe in Love" (3:32)
8. "Love and Devotion" (3:19)
9. "I Wanna Be Free" (3:21)
10. "I'm Alright" (3:26)
11. "Out of Words" (3:54)
