= Take Me Away (Twenty 4 Seven song) =

Song recorded by the Dutch group Twenty 4 Seven

- CD single - Netherlands

Single by Twenty 4 Seven

from the album Slave to the Music
- Released: 28 February 1994 (other countries)
- Genre: Eurodance
- Length: 3:36 (single mix)
- Label: Indisc
- Songwriters: Twenty 4 Seven; Ruud van Rijen; Stay-C
- Producers: Twenty 4 Seven; Ruud van Rijen

Twenty 4 Seven singles chronology
"Is It Love" (1993)	"Take Me Away" (1994)	"Leave Them Alone" (1994)

Music video
- "Take Me Away" on YouTube

"Take Me Away" is a song recorded by Dutch group Twenty 4 Seven and released in 1994, by label Indisc, as the third single from their second album, Slave to the Music (1993). It is written and produced by the group with Ruud van Rijen. Unlike previous singles from the album, the song did not feature any raps. It achieved success on the charts in Europe, but didn't perform on the charts in the US. ("Slave to the Music" and "Leave Them Alone" were their only minor hits there.) The accompanying music video was directed by Fernando Garcia and filmed in South Africa.

== Chart performance ==
"Take Me Away" was a hit on the charts in Europe and a top-10 hit in both Iceland and Spain, peaking at number 10 in both countries. The single was also a top-20 hit in Denmark, Finland, Germany and the Netherlands. In Germany, it spent 19 weeks inside the German Singles Chart, peaking at number 14. Additionally, "Take Me Away" reached the top 30 in Austria, Belgium and Sweden, as well as on the European Hot 100 Singles chart, where it peaked at number 25. In Switzerland, it was a top-40 hit. The single didn't perform on the charts in the UK or the US.

== Music video ==
The music video for "Take Me Away" was directed by Fernando Garcia, produced by Garcia Media and released in February 1994. The camera work is by Steve Walker and it was shot in Johannesburg, Durban, and Cape Town in South Africa. Parts of the video has a sepia tone. It received "prime break out" rotation on MTV Europe and was B-listed on German music television channel VIVA in April 1994. Later, It was made available by Arcade on YouTube in 2013, having generated more than two million views as of late 2025 on the platform.

== Track listing ==
- Vinyl 7" (Germany) - ZYX Music
1. "Take Me Away" (Single Mix) — 3:36
2. "Take Me Away" (E&M Club Mix) — 5:00
- Vinyl 12" (Germany) - ZYX Music
1. "Take Me Away" (Single Mix) — 3:36
2. "Take Me Away" (RVR Long Version) — 5:44
3. "Is It Love" (Ferry & Garnefski Club Mix) — 5:53
4. "Take Me Away" (E&M Club Mix) — 5:00
- Vinyl 12" (Netherlands) - Indisc
1. "Take Me Away" (Single Mix) — 3:36
2. "Take Me Away" (RVR Long Version) — 5:44
3. "Is It Love" (Ferry & Garnefski Club Mix) — 5:53
4. "Take Me Away" (E&M Club Mix) — 5:00
- CD single (Australia) - Possum
1. "Take Me Away" (Single Mix) — 3:36
2. "Take Me Away" (E&M Club Mix) — 5:00
3. "Is It Love" (Ferry & Garnefski Club Mix) — 5:53
4. "Take Me Away" (RVR Long Version) — 5:44
- CD single (Netherlands) - Indisc
1. "Take Me Away" (Single Mix) — 3:36
2. "Take Me Away" (E&M Club Mix) — 5:00
- CD maxi (Netherlands) - Indisc
1. "Take Me Away" (Single Mix) — 3:36
2. "Take Me Away" (E&M Club Mix) — 5:00
3. "Is It Love" (Ferry & Garnefski Club Mix) — 5:53
4. "Take Me Away" (RVR Long Version) — 5:44
- CD maxi (Germany) - ZYX Music
1. "Take Me Away" (Single Mix) — 3:36
2. "Take Me Away" (E&M Club Mix) — 5:00
3. "Is It Love" (Ferry & Garnefski Club Mix) — 5:53
4. "Take Me Away" (RVR Long Version) — 5:44

== Charts ==
=== Weekly charts ===
Chart (1994)	Peak position
Australia (ARIA)	52
Austria (Ö3 Austria Top 40)	28
Belgium (Ultratop 50 Flanders)	21
Denmark (IFPI)	16
Europe (European Hot 100 Singles)	25
Finland (Suomen virallinen lista)	20
Germany (GfK)	14
Iceland (Íslenski Listinn Topp 40)	10
Netherlands (Dutch Top 40)	12
Netherlands (Single Top 100)	11
Spain (ALEF MB)	10
Switzerland (Schweizer Hitparade)	41
Sweden (Sverigetopplistan)	23

=== Year-end charts ===
Chart (1994)	Position
Austria (Ö3 Austria Top 40)	28
Belgium (VRT Top 30 Flanders)	36
Europe (European Hot 100 Singles)	74
Germany (Media Control)	83
Iceland (Íslenski Listinn Topp 40)	84
Netherlands (Dutch Top 40)	79
Netherlands (Single Top 100)	84
Sweden (Topplistan)	39
Switzerland (Schweizer Hitparade)	43
