= Street Moves =

Studio album by Twenty 4 Seven
- Released: 19 January 1991
- Recorded: 1989–1990
- Label: BCM Records
- Producer: Ruud van Rijen, Tony Dawson-Harrison

Twenty 4 Seven chronology
Street Moves (1991)	Slave to the Music (1993)

Singles from Street Moves
- 1. "I Can't Stand It!" Released: 22 September 1990; 2. "Are You Dreaming?" Released: 24 November 1990

Street Moves is the debut album by Dutch group Twenty 4 Seven. It was produced by Ruud van Rijen and released on the label BCM Records in 1990. Captain Hollywood performed the rap parts.

The album also features two singles, "I Can't Stand It!" and its follow-up "Are You Dreaming?". The latter includes a Bruce Forest remix of the song "I Can't Stand It!".

== Track listing ==
1. "I Can't Stand It" – 4:07
2. "Whom Do You Trust?" – 5:37
3. "In Your Eyes" – 4:27
4. "Are You Dreaming?" – 4:56
5. "Help 'Em Understand" – 4:01
6. "Living In The Jungle" – 4:33
7. "You Can Make Me Feel Good" – 4:13
8. "Show Me Your Love Tonight" – 4:39
9. "Find A Better Way" – 3:57
10. "I Can't Stand It" (Bruce Forest Remix) – 3:35

== Charts ==
Chart (1990/1991)	Peak position
Switzerland (Schweizer Hitparade)	25
Sweden (Sverigetopplistan)	50
UK Albums Chart (The Official Charts Company)	69

== Credits ==
- Artwork by LWW
- Photography by Esser & Strauss Studios
- Producer – Jim Soulier, Ruud van Rijen
- Rap vocals – Captain Hollywood
