= Oh Baby (Twenty 4 Seven song) =

"Oh Baby!"
- CD maxi - Germany

Single by Twenty 4 Seven

from the album I Wanna Show You
- Released: 15 October 1994
- Recorded: 1994
- Genre: Europop
- Label: CNR Music; ZYX Music; Scandinavian Records; Possum
- Songwriter: Ruud van Rijen
- Producer: Ruud van Rijen

Twenty 4 Seven singles chronology
| "Leave Them Alone" (1994) | "Oh Baby!" (1994) | "Keep on Tryin'" (1995) |

Music video
- "Oh Baby" on YouTube

"Oh Baby!" is a song by Dutch group Twenty 4 Seven, released by various labels in October 1994 as the first single from their third album, I Wanna Show You (1994). It was both written and produced by Ruud van Rijen. A midtempo ballad, "Oh Baby!" did not have the same impact on the charts as the group's previous singles, although it did reach the top 40 charts in several European countries. In the group's native Netherlands, it was a top-20 hit. The accompanying music video was directed by Steve Walker and shot in London.

== Charts ==
=== Weekly charts ===
| Chart (1994–1995) | Peak position |
|---|---|
| Australia (ARIA) | 120 |
| Belgium (Ultratop 50 Flanders) | 27 |
| Belgium (VRT Top 30 Flanders) | 21 |
| Germany (GfK) | 33 |
| Netherlands (Dutch Top 40) | 20 |
| Netherlands (Single Top 100) | 26 |
| Switzerland (Schweizer Hitparade) | 37 |

=== Year-end charts ===
| Chart (1994) | Position |
|---|---|
| Netherlands (Dutch Top 40) | 166 |
