= Nancy Coolen =

Nance
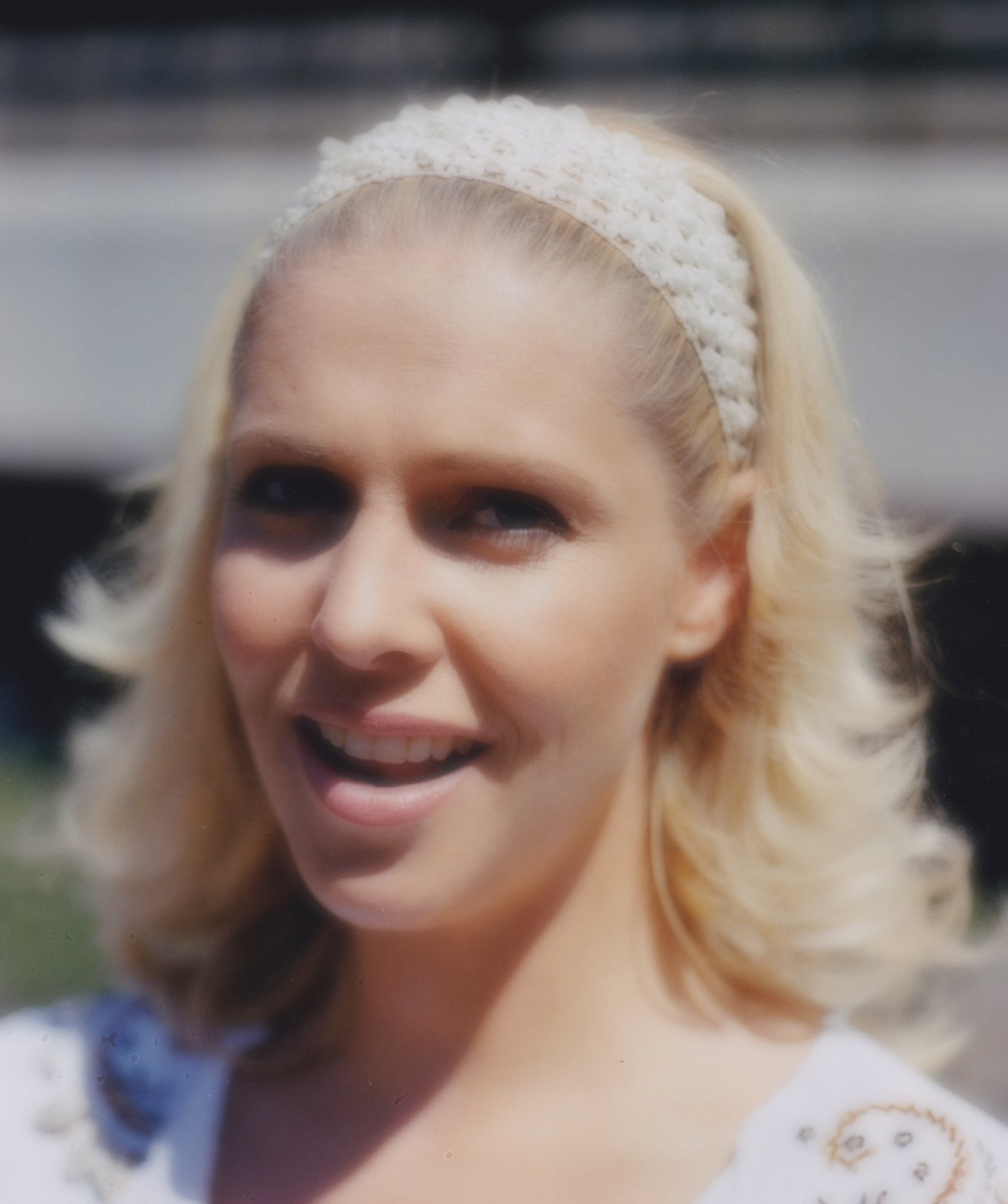

Background information
- Born: Nancy Anna Francina Coolen; 10 September 1973 (age 52)
- Origin: Asten, Netherlands
- Occupations: Singer, television presenter
- Years active: 1989–present
- Website: www.nance.nl

Nancy Anna Francina Coolen, known as Nance (born 10 September 1973 in Asten, North Brabant, Netherlands) is a Dutch singer and television presenter, and the former lead vocalist of Eurodance act Twenty 4 Seven.

At the age of 15, Nance was discovered in a club by dance producer Ruud van Rijen, who created the dance-act Twenty 4 Seven around her and rapper Captain Hollywood, who was later replaced by Stay C. The act scored several hits, most notably Slave to the Music.

In 1996, Nance left Twenty 4 Seven to embark on a solo career. Around the same time she began working as a presenter for Dutch television by occasionally hosting the Dutch Top 40 for TMF Nederland. Nance moved on to various game shows, such as Liefde is... for RTL 5 and Rappatongo for TROS, before taking over as the host of Lingo, which she presented until 2005.

== Singles with Twenty 4 Seven ==
Year	Single	Peak chart positions														Certifications (sales thresholds)	Album
Year	Single	AUS	AUT	FRA	BEL (Vl)	ITA	GER	NED	NOR	FIN	NZ	SUI	SWE	UK	EUR	Certifications (sales thresholds)	Album
1989	"I Can't Stand It"	—	2	39	38	2	3	17	—	—	22	2	5	7	1	GER: Gold; ITA: Gold; SPA: Gold	Street Moves
1990	"Are You Dreaming?"	—	22	—	—	8	16	18	—	6	—	4	—	17	8		Street Moves
1992	"It Could Have Been You"	—	—	—	—	—	—	—	—	—	—	—	—	—	—		—N/a
1993	"Slave to the Music"	2	—	—	23	—	8	6	5	7	—	14	4	—	20	AUS: Platinum; GER: Gold; POL: Gold	Slave to the Music
1993	"Is It Love"	20	9	—	11	—	5	6	—	—	—	24	7	—	11	GER: Gold	Slave to the Music
1994	"Take Me Away"	52	28	—	24	—	14	11	—	20	—	41	23	—	25		Slave to the Music
1994	"Leave Them Alone"	89	23	—	41	—	36	9	—	17	—	—	34	—	39		Slave to the Music
1994	"Oh Baby"	—	—	—	27	—	33	26	—	—	—	37	—	—	—		I Wanna Show You
1995	"Keep on Tryin'"	—	—	—	32	—	—	29	—	—	—	—	—	—	—		I Wanna Show You
"—" denotes a title that did not chart.

== Solo ==
Title	Year	Peak chart positions		Album
Title	Year	NED Top 100	NED Top 40	Album
"Love Is..."	1995	11	13	Singles only
"Big Brother is Watching You"	1996	14	10	Singles only
"Kiss It"	1996	19	36	Singles only
"He's My Favourite DJ"	1997	38	36	Singles only
"Miss You!"	1998	—	—	Singles only
"De Laatste En De Eerste"	1999	53	—	Singles only
"If U Wanna Dance"	2003	43	—	Singles only
"Higher"	2013	—	—	Singles only
"—" denotes releases that did not chart.
