= Slave to the Music (Twenty 4 Seven song) =

1993 single by Twenty 4 Seven

- CD Maxi

Single by Twenty 4 Seven

from the album Slave to the Music
- Released: 13 August 1993
- Length: 4:01
- Label: Indisc
- Songwriters: Twenty 4 Seven; Ruud van Rijen; Stay-C
- Producers: Twenty 4 Seven; Ruud van Rijen

Twenty 4 Seven singles chronology
"It Could Have Been You" (1992)	"Slave to the Music" (1993)	"Is It Love" (1993)

Music video
- "Slave to the Music" on YouTube

"Slave to the Music" is a song by Dutch Eurodance group Twenty 4 Seven, released on 13 August 1993 by Indisc as the third single and first song from their second studio album, Slave to the Music (1994). The song was written by the group with co-producer Ruud van Rijen and peaked within the top 10 in at least eight countries. It peaked at number two in Australia and Zimbabwe. The accompanying music video was directed by Fernando Garcia, Steve Walker and Leontine Willese, depicting group members Nance Coolen and Stay-C in front of different coloured backgrounds.

== Background and release ==
Twenty 4 Seven formed in 1989 by Dutch producer Ruud van Rijen, consisting of singer Nancy "Nance" Coolen and rapper Ricardo Overman (a.k.a. MC Fixxit). Tony Dawson-Harrison (a.k.a. Captain Hollywood) shortly after took over as new front man and rapper of the project. They had success with the singles "I Can't Stand It" and "Are You Dreaming?". In 1993, after Harrison left the group and went solo, rapper/singer Stacey Seedorf (a.k.a. Stay-C) was recruited into the act. After releasing the single "It Could Have Been You", which was unsuccessful on the charts, Seedorf was unsatisfied with it and decided to introduce producer Ruud van Rijen to a song he had written, "Slave to the Music". At first, van Rijen was unsure if Seedorf could write a song, but after hearing it the next day, he was amazed and thought it would be a hit.

Stay-C was inspired by German project N.U.K.E. and their 1992 single "Nana", which he had played as a DJ. Van Ruud had made an instrumental and Stay-C's new lyrics fitted perfectly. They then went into studio with Nance and recorded "Slave to the Music". After it was recorded with Nance, Stay-C and van Rijen came up with the idea that they wanted some backing on the song. But since Nance by then had left the studio, van Rijen had to perform it by himself. After the release of the single, it was a struggle to get it played on radio. After a few months, Stay-C started to lose his faith in that the song would be successful and started thinking about leaving Twenty 4 Seven. But then the song entered the Dutch tipparade, before climbing on the charts in Europe, Australia, Israel and South-Africa.

== Chart performance ==
"Slave to the Music" was a top-10 hit in Denmark, Finland, Germany, the Netherlands, Norway and Sweden. Additionally, it was a top-20 hit in Switzerland and a top-30 hit in Belgium. The single debuted on the Eurochart Hot 100 at number 84 on 28 August 1993, after charting in Belgium, Denmark and the Netherlands, later peaking at number 36. Elsewhere, the single charted in Africa, Oceania and West Asia, peaking at number two in Australia and Zimbabwe and number 17 in Israel. In Australia, it stayed within the ARIA Singles Chart top 50 for 19 weeks.

== Music video ==
The music video for "Slave to the Music" was released in September 1993 by Garcia Media Production, a studio company of Garcia Media based in Amsterdam, the Netherlands. It was directed by Fernando Garcia, Steve Walker and Leontine Willese, featuring group members Stay-C & Nance Coolen performing in front of different coloured backgrounds. During the making, a green screen was used. The video also features scenes with a jumping toad and a dancing boy called Dion.

== Track listings ==
- Vinyl 12-inch, Greece
1. "Slave to the Music" (Ultimate Dance Single Mix) – 4:01
2. "Slave to the Music" (Ferry & Garnefski Club Mix) – 5:02
- Vinyl 12-inch, Netherlands (Indisc)
1. "Slave to the Music" (Ultimate Dance Extended Mix) – 6:08
2. "Slave to the Music" (Extended Instrumental Mix) – 5:10
3. "Slave to the Music" (Ultimate Dance Single Mix) – 4:01
4. "Slave to the Music" (Ferry & Garnefski Club Mix) – 5:02
5. "Slave to the Music" (Ferry & Garnefski Acid Mix) – 5:09
- CD single, Australia & New Zealand (Possum)
1. "Slave to the Music" (Ultimate Dance Single Mix) – 4:01
2. "Slave to the Music" (Ferry & Garnefski Club Mix) – 5:02
3. "Slave to the Music" (Ultimate Dance Extended Mix) – 6:08
4. "Slave to the Music" (Ferry & Garnefski Acid Mix) – 5:09
- CD single, Europe
1. "Slave to the Music" (Ultimate Dance Single Mix) – 4:01
2. "Slave to the Music" (Ferry & Garnefski Club Mix) – 5:02
- CD single, Scandinavia (CNR Records/Indisc)
1. "Slave to the Music" (Ultimate Dance Single Mix) – 4:01
2. "Slave to the Music" (Ferry & Garnefski Club Mix) – 5:02
3. "Slave to the Music" (Ultimate Dance Extended Mix) – 6:08
4. "Slave to the Music" (Ferry & Garnefski Acid Mix) – 5:09
- CD maxi, Germany (ZYX Music) (Including New Remix)
1. "Slave to the Music" (Ultimate Dance Single Mix) – 4:01
2. "Slave to the Music" (Ferry & Garnefski Club Mix) – 5:02
3. "Slave to the Music" (Ultimate Dance Extended Mix) – 6:08
4. "Slave to the Music" (Ferry & Garnefski Acid Mix) – 5:09
5. "Slave to the Music" (Re-Mix) – 5:57
- CD maxi, US (ZYX Music) (Including U.S. Remixes)
1. "Slave to the Music" (DJ EFX's Funky Tribalist Mix) – 6:20
2. "Slave to the Music" (DJ EFX's Bonus A La Pump) – 3:08
3. "Slave to the Music" (Tyler's Radio Mix) – 4:03
4. "Slave to the Music" (Tyler's Club Mix) – 6:19
5. "Slave to the Music" (Ferry & Garnefski Club Mix) – 5:02
6. "Slave to the Music" (Razormaid Mix) – 6:04
- CD maxi, US (ZYX Music) (Including Mass Attack Radio Edit)
1. "Slave to the Music" (Mass Attack Radio Edit) – 4:32
2. "Slave to the Music" (Ultimate Dance Single Mix) – 4:01
3. "Slave to the Music" (Tyler's Radio Edit) – 4:03
4. "Slave to the Music" (Digital Mix) – 6:04

== Charts ==
=== Weekly charts ===
Chart (1993–1994)	Peak position
Australia (ARIA)	2
Belgium (Ultratop 50 Flanders)	23
Denmark (IFPI)	4
Denmark (Tracklisten)	7
Europe (Eurochart Hot 100)	36
Finland (Suomen virallinen lista)	7
France Dance (Top Dance)	13
Germany (GfK)	8
Iceland (Íslenski Listinn Topp 40)	34
Israel (Israeli Singles Chart)	17
Netherlands (Dutch Top 40)	5
Netherlands (Single Top 100)	6
Norway (VG-lista)	5
Sweden (Sverigetopplistan)	4
Switzerland (Schweizer Hitparade)	14
Zimbabwe (ZIMA)	2

=== Year-end charts ===
Chart (1993)	Position
Netherlands (Dutch Top 40)	21
Netherlands (Single Top 100)	32
Sweden (Topplistan)	31

Chart (1994)	Position
Australia (ARIA)	12
Germany (Media Control)	65
