= Are You Dreaming? =

Single by Twenty 4 Seven

from the album Street Moves
- Released: 24 November 1990
- Recorded: 1990
- Genre: Hip house; hip-hop; Euro house
- Length: 2:45
- Label: BCM Records
- Songwriters: Twenty 4 Seven; Ruud van Rijen; Tony Dawson-Harrison
- Producers: Twenty 4 Seven; Ruud van Rijen

Twenty 4 Seven singles chronology
"I Can't Stand It" (1990)	"Are You Dreaming?" (1990)	"It Could Have Been You" (1992)

Music video
- "Are You Dreaming?" on YouTube

"Are You Dreaming?" is a song by Dutch group Twenty 4 Seven, released in November 1990 by BCM Records as the second single from their first album, Street Moves (1991). Nancy Coolen performed the vocal parts, and Captain Hollywood and the rap parts—with Hanks aka. Giovanni Falco. The song was a top-10 hit in Denmark, Finland, Israel, Italy and Switzerland. In the UK, it reached number 17 on the UK Singles Chart.

"Are You Dreaming?"
Sample of "Are You Dreaming?", the second single by Twenty 4 Seven.

== Critical reception ==
A reviewer from Music Week described the song as a "pop-rap galloper". David Quantick from NME wrote, "I wish I was called Captain Hollywood. This is shamelessly happy Euro pop rap and keeps threatening to turn into Modern Romance's 'The Best Years of Our Lives'. Ay ay ay ay, it's a new romance. Ay ay ay ay, it makes me want to dance." Miranda Sawyer from Smash Hits said, "Still this tune is good in an annoyingly sparkly-eyed, keep fit sort of way."

== Track listing ==
- Vinyl 7", Netherlands
1. "Are You Dreaming?" (Radio Edit) — 2:45
2. "Are You Dreaming?" (Instrumental Edit) — 3:18
- Vinyl 12", Italy
1. "Are You Dreaming?" (Radio Edit) — 2:45
2. "Are You Dreaming?" (Dream Dub) — 4:24
3. "Are You Dreaming?" (Nightmare Mix) — 5:08
4. "Are You Dreaming?" (Acapella) — 4:24
- CD maxi, UK
1. "Are You Dreaming?" (Radio Edit) — 2:45
2. "Are You Dreaming?" (Bruce Forest Radio Edit) — 4:01
3. "Are You Dreaming?" (Bruce Forest Remix) — 6:53
4. "Are You Dreaming?" (Nightmare Mix) — 5:08
- CD maxi, Germany
1. "Are You Dreaming?" (Radio Edit) — 2:45
2. "Are You Dreaming?" (Nightmare Mix) — 5:08
3. "Are You Dreaming?" (Acapella) — 4:24
4. "Are You Dreaming?" (Dream Dub) — 4:24
- CD maxi, Scandinavia
1. "Are You Dreaming?" (Radio Edit) — 2:45
2. "Are You Dreaming?" (Nightmare Mix) — 5:08
3. "Are You Dreaming?" (Acapella) — 4:24
4. "Are You Dreaming?" (Dream Dub) — 4:24

== Charts ==
=== Weekly charts ===
Weekly chart performance for "Are You Dreaming?"
Chart (1990–1991)	Peak position
Austria (Ö3 Austria Top 40)	22
Denmark (IFPI)	5
Europe (Eurochart Hot 100)	8
Finland (Suomen virallinen lista)	6
Germany (GfK)	16
Israel (Israeli Singles Chart)	9
Italy (Musica e dischi)	5
Luxembourg (Radio Luxembourg)	17
Netherlands (Dutch Top 40)	21
Netherlands (Single Top 100)	18
Switzerland (Schweizer Hitparade)	4
UK Singles (OCC)	17

=== Year-end charts ===
Annual chart rankings for "Are You Dreaming?"
Chart (1991)	Position
Austria (Ö3 Austria Top 40)	30
Europe (European Hot 100 Singles)	85
Germany (Media Control Charts)	95
Italy (Musica e dischi)	57
Netherlands (Single Top 100)	85
Switzerland (Schweizer Hitparade)	29
