= If You Want My Love (Twenty 4 Seven song) =

Single by Twenty 4 Seven

from the album Twenty 4 Hours A Day, Seven Days A Week
- Released: 27 March 1997
- Recorded: 1996
- Genre: Happy hardcore, gabber
- Length: 3:46
- Label: CNR Music
- Songwriter(s): Ruud van Rijen
- Producer(s): Ruud van Rijen

Twenty 4 Seven singles chronology
"We Are the World" (1996)	"If You Want My Love" (1997)	"Friday Night" (1997)

Music video
- "If You Want My Love" on YouTube

"If You Want My Love" is a song recorded by the Dutch band Twenty 4 Seven. It was the tenth single and the sixth song to be taken from the fourth album, Twenty 4 Hours A Day, Seven Days A Week. The song remained a constant area of success only in the Netherlands, the single reached 77 on the (Single Top 100). It did not chart in the United Kingdom. "If You Want My Love" was postponed a couple of times, because "We Are the World" did successfully well in many other countries, like Spain where it went top 10.

== Charts ==
Chart (1997)	Peak position
Netherlands (Single Top 100)	77
