= Indisc =

Belgian Dutch record label

Indisc was a Belgian Dutch company composed of Brothers Goemaere & Brothers Brandsteder, and founded in 1957 by ex-employees of the Belgian Fonior (Brothers Goemaere) and the Dutch Dureco (Brothers Brandsteder) as Inelco (short for International Electronic Company).

In 1983, Inelco went into bankruptcy. Shortly after, it was renamed "Indisc" (short for Inelco Disc). In 1993, Indisc merged with CNR Records, which Arcade Records had bought the year before, to form CNR Indisc. A year after, Indisc was absorbed into CNR Music.
