= Da Buzz =

Swedish Eurodance/pop group

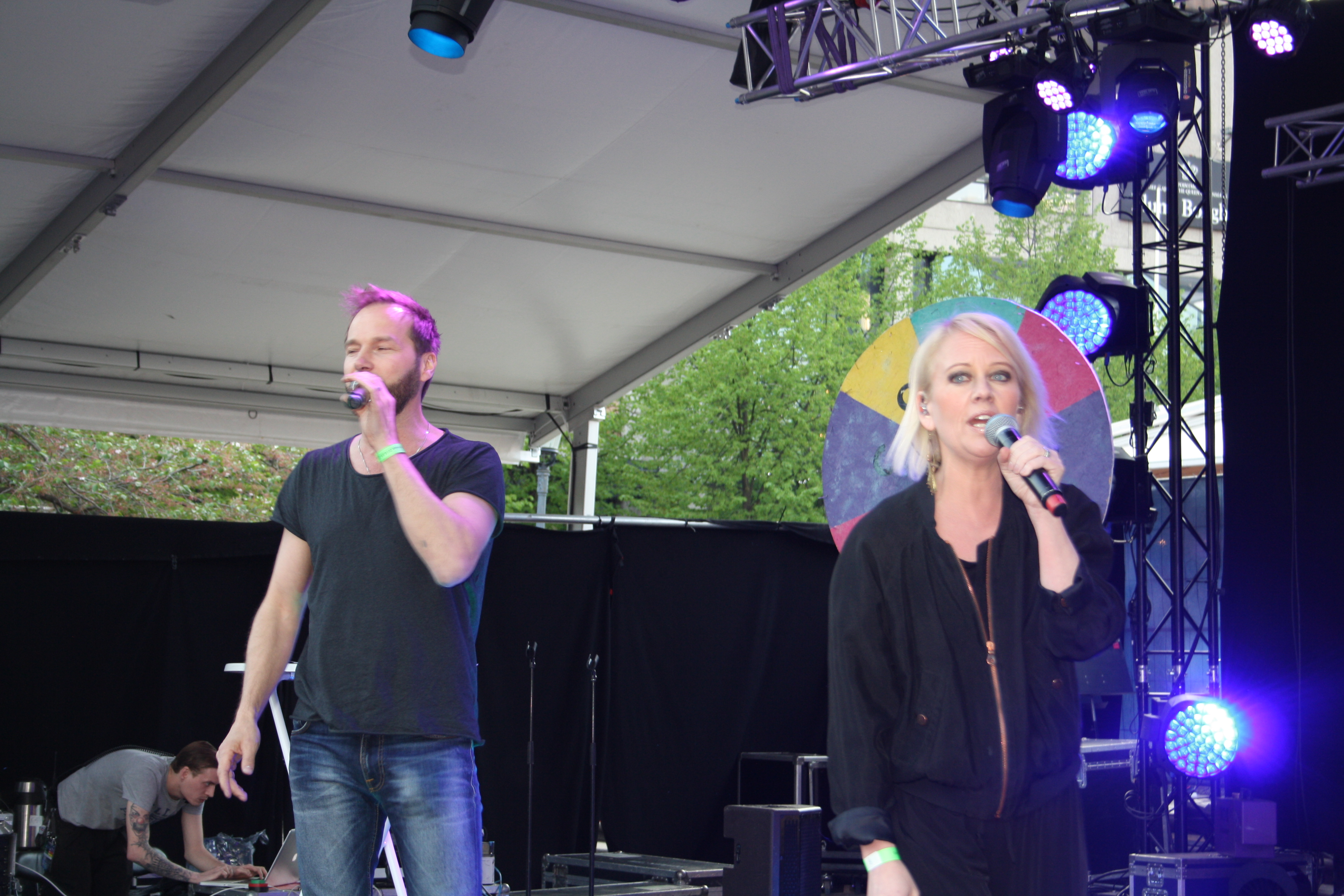
- Da Buzz - Eurovision Village 2016

Background information
- Origin: Karlstad, Sweden
- Genres: Eurodance, Pop, dance-pop
- Years active: 1999–2009, 2010–present
- Label: Bonnier Amigo
- Members: Per Lidén; Annika Thörnquist
- Past members: Pier Schmid

Da Buzz is a Swedish Eurodance/pop music group. Members of the group are writers/producers Per Lidén and Pier Schmid and lead-singer Annika Thörnquist. All three are from Karlstad.

The band has had a successful career in their native country Sweden, with a career spanning seven years, five albums, and 15 hit singles. They have reached #1 twice in their homeland; in 2003 with "Alive" and in 2006 with "Last Goodbye". The band landed a #1 Billboard Magazine Club hit in the United States with the Hex Hector remix of "Let Me Love You". They participated in Melodifestivalen in 2003 with the song "Stop Look Listen". A greatest hits album was released in November 2007. Their latest single "Baby Listen to Me" was released in September 2007, and became the band's 9th top 10 hit.

On 10 July 2009, Da Buzz announced: "[...]is currently taking a break and we would like to thank all our fans for your wonderful support during the years. We will be back in the future but we don't know when yet. Thank you" Da Buzz "came back" in 2010 with brand new single "U Gotta Dance" on 7 June.

In June 2011, one of the Karlstad transit buses was named after the group.

== Awards and nominations ==
| Award | Year | Nominee(s) | Category | Result | Ref. |
|---|---|---|---|---|---|
| Grammis | 2004 | "Alive" | Song of the Year | Nominated | |
| Grammis | 2005 | Dangerous – The Album | Best Club/Dance | Nominated | |
| International Dance Music Awards | 2007 | "Without Breaking" | Best HiNRG/Euro Track | Nominated | |

== Discography ==
=== Albums ===
| Year | Album | Chart positions | |
| Year | Album | SWE | NOR |
|---|---|---|---|
| 2000 | Da Sound | 16 | 15 |
| 2002 | Wanna Be With Me? | 19 | - |
| 2003 | More Than Alive | 2 | - |
| 2004 | Dangerous - The Album | 6 | 30 |
| 2006 | Last Goodbye / Alive & Dangerous (US title) | 18 | - |
| 2007 | The Greatest Hits | 35 | - |
| 2021 | Wanna See You Dance With Me | - | - |
| 2023 | My Life | - | - |

=== Singles ===
| Year | Title | Album | Chart positions | | | |
| Year | Title | Album | SWE | FIN | NOR | BEL |
|---|---|---|---|---|---|---|
| 1999 | "Paradise" | Da Sound | 47 | - | - | - |
| 2000 | "Do You Want Me" | Da Sound | 6 | - | 7 | 19 |
| 2000 | "Let Me Love You" | Da Sound | 10 | - | - | - |
| 2001 | "Believe in Love" | Da Sound | 35 | - | - | - |
| 2002 | "Wanna Be With Me?" | Wanna Be With Me? | 3 | - | 18 | - |
| 2002 | "Wonder Where You Are" | Wanna Be With Me? | 17 | - | - | - |
| 2002 | "Stronger Than Words Can Say" | Wanna Be With Me? | 52 | - | - | - |
| 2003 | "Stop! Look! Listen!" | - | - | - | - | - |
| 2003 | "Alive" | More Than Alive | 1 | - | - | - |
| 2003 | "Tonight (Is the Night)" | More Than Alive | 2 | - | - | - |
| 2003 | "Wanna Love You Forever" | More Than Alive | -* | - | - | - |
| 2004 | "Dangerous" | Dangerous - The Album | 5 | 20 | - | - |
| 2004 | "How Could You Leave Me" | Dangerous - The Album | 28 | - | - | - |
| 2004 | "Come Away With Me" | Dangerous - The Album | -* | - | - | - |
| 2006 | "Last Goodbye" | Last Goodbye | 1 | - | - | - |
| 2006 | "Without Breaking" | Last Goodbye | 11 | - | - | - |
| 2007 | "Soon My Heart" / "World for 2" | Last Goodbye | 39 | - | - | - |
| 2007 | "Take All My Love" | The Greatest Hits | 8 | 7 | - | - |
| 2007 | "Baby Listen to Me" | The Greatest Hits | 7 | 9 | - | - |
| 2010 | "U Gotta Dance" | - | - | - | - | - |
| 2012 | "Got This Feeling" | - | - | - | - | - |
| 2014 | "Can You Feel the Love" | - | - | - | - | - |
| 2014 | "The Moment I Found You" | - | - | - | - | - |
| 2014 | "Bring Back the Summer" | - | - | - | - | - |
| 2016 | "Still Miss You" | Wanna See You Dance with Me | - | - | - | - |
| 2016 | "Something about You" | - | - | - | - | - |
| 2018 | "Where My Heart Lies" | Wanna See You Dance with Me | - | - | - | - |
| 2019 | "True Colors" | - | - | - | - | - |
| 2019 | "Touch My Soul" | Wanna See You Dance with Me | - | - | - | - |
| 2019 | "Love Like This" | - | - | - | - | - |
| 2020 | "Hard to Love" | - | - | - | - | - |
| 2020 | "Feel Your Love" | - | - | - | - | - |
| 2020 | "Run for the Light" | Wanna See You Dance with Me | - | - | - | - |
| 2020 | "All I Want Is You" | - | - | - | - | - |
| 2021 | "Here Comes the Rain Again" | Wanna See You Dance with Me | - | - | - | - |
| 2021 | "Slow It Down" | Wanna See You Dance with Me | - | - | - | - |
| 2021 | "Waiting for Your Love" | Wanna See You Dance with Me | - | - | - | - |
| 2021 | "Tell Me Why" | - | - | - | - | - |
| 2021 | "Wanna See You Dance with Me" | Wanna See You Dance with Me | - | - | - | - |
| 2023 | "I Can't Help Falling for Your Love" | My Life | - | - | - | - |
| 2023 | "My Life" | My Life | - | - | - | - |
| 2024 | "Unbreak Me" | - | - | - | - | - |
| 2024 | "We Go La La La" | - | - | - | - | - |
| 2024 | "Only Love Can Save Us" | - | - | - | - | - |
| 2024 | "You & Me" | - | - | - | - | - |
| 2024 | "Set My Heart on Fire" | - | - | - | - | - |
| 2025 | "Get Your Love" | - | - | - | - | - |
| 2025 | "This Night I'm in Love" | - | - | - | - | - |
| 2026 | "Give Yourself to Me" | - | - | - | - | - |

- * Download only singles. "Wanna Love You Forever" and "Come Away With Me" were ineligible for the Swedish charts as at the time downloads were not included in the Swedish singles chart. "Soon My Heart" charted on download only sales, which were incorporated into the Swedish charts in January 2007.

== Japan bonus tracks ==
- Wanna Be With Me?: One of Us, Wonder Where You Are (Da Rob'n'Raz Remix Radio Gizzm)
- Da Sound: WO Ai Ni, Fascination, One in a Million, Let Me Love You (Hex), Let Me Love You (Axwell), Let Me Love You (Club)
- Last Goodbye: Dreams
