= Is It Love (Twenty 4 Seven song) =

1993 single by Twenty 4 Seven

- CD Maxi

Single by Twenty 4 Seven

from the album Slave to the Music
- Released: 14 November 1993
- Genre: Eurodance
- Length: 3:56 (single mix)
- Label: Indisc
- Songwriters: Twenty 4 Seven; Ruud van Rijen; Stay-C
- Producers: Twenty 4 Seven; Ruud van Rijen

Twenty 4 Seven singles chronology
"Slave to the Music" (1993)	"Is It Love" (1993)	"Take Me Away" (1994)

Music video
- "Is It Love" on YouTube

"Is It Love" is a song recorded by Dutch Eurodance group Twenty 4 Seven, released in November 1993, by label Indisc, as the fourth single from their second studio album, Slave To The Music (1993). It was the first up-tempo song written by Ruud van Rijen, who also co-produced the song with the group. "Is It Love" experienced success on the charts in Europe, peaking at number five in Germany. The chorus is sung by Nance Coolen while the rap parts are performed by Stay-C. Maria Jimenez from pan-European magazine Music & Media described it as a "sugar-coated highly commercial track".

== Chart performance ==
"Is It Love" entered the top 10 in Austria, Denmark, Germany, the Netherlands, Portugal, and Sweden. In Germany, it spent 19 weeks within the German Singles Chart. On the Eurochart Hot 100, it debuted at number 32, after charting in Belgium, Denmark, the Netherlands, Portugal and Sweden. It peaked at number 16, while reaching number 13 on the European Dance Radio Chart. The song was a top-20 hit also in Belgium, and Iceland. It didn't chart on the UK Singles Chart. Outside Europe, "Is It Love" charted at number eight in Zimbabwe, and number 20 in both Australia and New Zealand. It earned a gold record in Germany, with a sale of 250,000 singles.

== Music video ==
The partially black-and-white music video for "Is It Love" was released in December 1993 by Garcia Media Production. It was videoed by Fernando Garcia and Steve Walker, and filmed in Belgium and the Netherlands. It has a storyline of a man seeing a woman in a bar, played by group member Nance Coolen. He falls in love with her and follows her with flowers, but eventually she is being picked up by a car. MTV Europe put the video on "prime break out" rotation in the beginning of January 1994, while it was A-listed by German music television channel VIVA in February.

== Track listing ==
- 12-inch (Netherlands) - Indisc

A1. "Is It Love" (Single Mix) — 3:56
A2. "Is It Love" (RVR Long Version) — 5:30
B1. "Slave to the Music" (Naked Eye Remix) — 5:53
B2. "Is It Love" (Dancability Club Mix) — 5:04

- CD single (Netherlands) - Indisc
1. "Is It Love" — 3:56
2. "Is It Love" (Dancability Club Mix) — 5:04
- CD single (Netherlands) - Indisc
1. "Is It Love" (Single Mix) — 3:56
2. "Is It Love" (Dancability Club Mix) — 5:04
3. "Slave to the Music" (Naked Eye Remix) — 5:53
4. "Is It Love" (RVR Long Version) — 5:30
- CD single (Australia & New Zealand) - Possum
1. "Is It Love" (Single Mix) — 3:56
2. "Is It Love" (Dancability Club Mix) — 5:04
3. "Slave to the Music" (Naked Eye Remix) — 5:53
4. "Is It Love" (RVR Long Version) — 5:30
- CD single (Scandinavia) - Scandinavian Records
1. "Is It Love" (Single Mix) — 3:56
2. "Is It Love" (Dancability Club Mix) — 5:04
3. "Slave to the Music" (Naked Eye Remix) — 5:53
4. "Is It Love" (RVR Long Version) — 5:30
- CD maxi (Germany) - ZYX Music
1. "Is It Love" (Single Mix) — 3:56
2. "Is It Love" (Dancability Club Mix) — 5:04
3. "Slave to the Music" (Naked Eye Remix) — 5:53
4. "Is It Love" (RVR Long Version) — 5:30
- CD mini (Japan) - Cutting Edge
1. "Is It Love" (Single Mix) — 3:56
2. "Slave to the Music" (Naked Eye Remix) — 5:53
3. "Is It Love" (Dancability Club Mix) — 5:04
4. "Slave to the Music" (Ferry & Garnefski Club Mix) — 5:02

== Charts ==
=== Weekly charts ===
Chart (1993–1994)	Peak position
Australia (ARIA)	20
Austria (Ö3 Austria Top 40)	9
Belgium (Ultratop 50 Flanders)	11
Denmark (IFPI)	6
Europe (Eurochart Hot 100)	16
Europe (European Dance Radio)	13
Germany (GfK)	5
Iceland (Íslenski Listinn Topp 40)	11
Netherlands (Dutch Top 40)	7
Netherlands (Single Top 100)	6
New Zealand (Recorded Music NZ)	20
Portugal (AFP)	4
Sweden (Sverigetopplistan)	7
Switzerland (Schweizer Hitparade)	24
Zimbabwe (ZIMA)	8

=== Year-end charts ===
Chart (1993)	Position
Netherlands (Dutch Top 40)	109

Chart (1994)	Position
Australia (ARIA)	74
Austria (Ö3 Austria Top 40)	29
Belgium (Ultratop)	61
Europe (Eurochart Hot 100)	70
Germany (Media Control)	41
Netherlands (Dutch Top 40)	80
Netherlands (Single Top 100)	56
Sweden (Topplistan)	39
Switzerland (Schweizer Hitparade)	46

== Certifications ==
Region	Certification	Certified units/sales
Germany (BVMI)	Gold	250,000^{^}
^{^} Shipments figures based on certification alone.
