= I Can't Stand It! =

1990 single by Twenty 4 Seven

Single by Twenty 4 Seven featuring MC Fixx It or Captain Hollywood

from the album Street Moves
- Released: 1990
- Genre: Hip house
- Length: 4:05 (radio version)
- Label: Freaky
- Songwriters: Ruud van Rijen; Tony Dawson-Harrison
- Producers: Ruud van Rijen; Tony Dawson-Harrison

Twenty 4 Seven singles chronology
"I Can't Stand It!" (1990)	"Are You Dreaming?" (1990)

Music video
- "I Can't Stand It" on YouTube

"I Can't Stand It"
Sample of "I Can't Stand It".

"I Can't Stand It!" is a song by Dutch-American musical group Twenty 4 Seven, released as their debut single in 1990. Issued through Freaky Records, it served as the lead single from their debut album, Street Moves (1991). The song was produced by Dutch producer Ruud van Rijen and American musician Tony Dawson-Harrison (Captain Hollywood). The first version of the single featured rap vocals from rapper Ricardo Overman (MC Fixx It). After Overman's quick departure from the act, a new version of the single was recorded with Harrison. Both versions of the single featured singing vocals from Dutch singer Nancy Coolen. The single reached number one in Italy and the top five in several European countries, including Austria, Austria, Luxembourg, Spain, Sweden, Switzerland and West Germany. Two different music videos were produced to promote the single.

== Critical reception ==
Larry Flick from Billboard magazine described the song as a "light and catchy hip-houser". A reviewer from Music & Media wrote, "'I Can't Stand It' will never be regarded as innovative: the Martin Luther King [actually is a sample from Khalid Muhammad] 'Robbed Of Our Nation..!' speech, the Kraftwerk-like synth, the ooh's and yeah' s have all been heard before, but seldom in such a strong pop context. The chorus, sung by Dutch Wendy James look-alike Nancy, is extremely catchy." The magazine also stated, "Without doubt one of the strongest hip house records for some time, one that really stands out from the crowd."

== Music video ==
Nancy Coolen in the official video of "I Can't Stand It".

There were two different music videos for the single albeit had the same setting (set outside a church with a Cadillac parked in front of it). It was directed by Martin Beek and filmed in Cranendonck castle, Soerendonk in the Netherlands. Marvels Film produced the video. The original hip-house version features Fixxit, Coolen and the dancers along with additional female dancers. When it later released internationally as a single it was redone with Hollywood as the featured rapper in place of Fixxit. Even the scene where the Cadillac's owner pushed aside the rappers was altered; Fixxit riding off in a bike, Hollywood in a car in need of gasoline. The video's song and message also featured the image and quotes of Nelson Mandela flashing in the song break. There was also made a new music video for the Bruce Forest remix, which was directed by E. Geiben & K. Merkel and shot in Germany.

== Track listings ==
- CD mini, Netherlands; Vinyl 12-inch, Australia
1. "I Can't Stand It!" (original single version) — 4:09
2. "I Can't Stand It!" (Hip House single version) — 3:59
3. "I Can't Stand It!" (12-inch club nix) — 6:33
4. "I Can't Stand It!" (12-inch Hip House remix) — 6:02
- CD maxi, UK and Europe
1. "I Can't Stand It!" (radio version) — 4:05
2. "I Can't Stand It!" (Hip House remix) — 6:10
3. "I Can't Stand It!" (long instrumental) — 6:10
- CD maxi, UK and Europe
1. "I Can't Stand It!" (radio remix) — 3:35
2. "I Can't Stand It!" (club remix) — 9:35
3. "I Can't Stand It!" (dub mix) — 6:40
- Vinyl 12-inch, Canada
1. "I Can't Stand It!" (club mix) — 9:35
2. "I Can't Stand It!" (Hip House mix) — 6:10

== Charts ==
=== Weekly charts ===
Weekly chart performance for "I Can't Stand It!"
Chart (1990–1991)	Peak position
Australia (ARIA)	130
Austria (Ö3 Austria Top 40)	2
Belgium (Ultratop 50 Flanders)	38
Denmark (IFPI)	3
Europe (Eurochart Hot 100)	7
France (SNEP)	39
Greece (IFPI)	10
Israel (Israeli Singles Chart)	10
Italy (Musica e dischi)	1
Italy Airplay (Music & Media)	1
Luxembourg (Radio Luxembourg)	3
Netherlands (Dutch Top 40)	24
Netherlands (Single Top 100)	17
New Zealand (Recorded Music NZ)	22
Portugal (AFP)	2
Spain (AFYVE)	3
Sweden (Sverigetopplistan)	5
Switzerland (Schweizer Hitparade)	2
UK Singles (Official Charts)	7
UK Dance (Music Week)	12
UK Indie (Music Week)	1
US Dance Club Play (Billboard)	44
West Germany (GfK)	3
Zimbabwe (ZIMA)	10

=== Year-end charts ===
Year-end chart performance for "I Can't Stand It!"
Chart (1990)	Position
Austria (Ö3 Austria Top 40)	5
Europe (Eurochart Hot 100)	19
Germany (Media Control)	12
Italy (Musica e dischi)	3
Sweden (Topplistan)	20
Switzerland (Schweizer Hitparade)	4
UK Singles (OCC)	69

=== Decade-end charts ===
Decade-end chart performance for "I Can't Stand It!"
Chart (1990–1999)	Position
Austria (Ö3 Austria Top 40)	58

== Certifications ==
Certifications for "I Can't Stand It!"
Region	Certification	Certified units/sales
Austria (IFPI Austria)	Gold	25,000^{*}
^{*} Sales figures based on certification alone.
