= Allsång på Skansen =

Swedish musical TV program

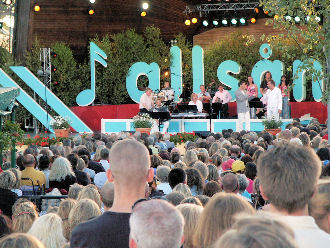
- Allsång på Skansen on 20 July 2004
- Presented by: Pernilla Wahlgren
- Theme music composer: Lasse Berghagen (Stockholm i mitt hjärta); Bengt Haslum (Sjung med, sjung med, per television, så blir vi en enad nation!)
- Opening theme: Stockholm i mitt hjärta (1994–present); Sjung med, sjung med, per television, så blir vi en enad nation! (1979–93)
- Country of origin: Sweden
- Original language: Swedish

Production
- Production locations: Skansen, Stockholm Fredriksten, Sarpsborg
- Running time: 60 minutes

Original release
- Network: SVT1
- Release: 3 August 1979

Allsång på Skansen (Sing-along at Skansen) is a Swedish show held at Skansen, Stockholm, every summer on Tuesdays between 8pm and 9pm. The audience is encouraged to sing along with musical guest stars to well-known Swedish and international songs. The show started in 1935 on a small scale; about 50 people in the audience. Today, about 10,000–25,500 people come to each performance.

Since 3 August 1979 the show has been broadcast by Sveriges Television. Initially the show had about 300,000 viewers. When Lasse Berghagen took over as host, the ratings increased to about 2 million viewers. In 2003, Allsång på Skansen was the first SVT programme that was broadcast with 5.1 multichannel sound. In 2007, it became one of the first Swedish live programmes broadcast in high-definition television. Although the show is scheduled to run for 90 minutes, only one hour of it is broadcast on SVT1 but viewers can watch the entire show on SVT Play.

== Hosts ==
- 1935–1950: Sven Lilja (deceased 1951)
- 1956–1966: Egon Kjerrman (on Swedish Radio as Siste Man På Skansen)
- 1974–1993: Bosse Larsson
- 1994–2003: Lasse Berghagen
- 2004–2010: Anders Lundin (also 2003)
- 2011–2013: Måns Zelmerlöw
- 2014–2015: Petra Marklund
- 2016–2022: Sanna Nielsen
- 2023– : Pernilla Wahlgren

The guest musical star who has appeared on the show the most is Robert Gustavsson, who has appeared 13 times.

== Guest appearances ==
=== 2003 ===
- JEERK

=== 2005 ===
- 28 June: Magnus Uggla, Darin Zanyar, Lena Philipsson and Sven-Bertil Taube.
- 5 July: Lasse Berghagen, Lill-Babs, Alcazar, Rigmor Gustavsson, Lina Nyberg och Viktoria Tolstoy.
- 12 July: Carola, Jan Malmsjö, Elena Paparizou, Eva Eastwood and Daniel Andersson.
- 19 July: Christer Sjögren, Caroline Wennergren and Diggiloo (Elisabeth Andreassen, Lotta Engberg, Jessica Andersson and Agneta Sjödin).
- 26 July: Håkan Hellström, Mats Paulsson, Rhapsody In Rock (Robert Wells, Peter Jöback, Shirley Clamp, Nanne Grönvall and Gunilla Backman) and Amy Diamond.
- 2 August: Tommy Nilsson, The Real Group and Benny Anderssons Orkester with Tommy Körberg and Helen Sjöholm.
- 9 August: Louise Hoffsten, Eva Dahlgren, Magnus Härenstam and Brasse Brännström.

=== 2006 ===
- 27 June: Tomas Ledin, Elias featuring Frans, Povel Ramel, Orphei Drängar, and Sebastian Karlsson.
- 4 July: Carola, Andreas Johnson, Carl-Anton, Sofia Karlsson, and I'm from Barcelona.
- 11 July: Håkan Hellström, Björn Kjellman, Katarina Fallholm, Bolibompabandet, and secret guest Lasse Lönndahl.
- 18 July: Lordi, Sven-Ingvars, Patrik Isaksson, and Laila Adéle.
- 25 July: Eric Gadd, Bröderna Trück, Agnes Carlsson, and Orup.
- 1 August: Lill Lindfors, Björn Skifs, Charlotte Perrelli, and Robert Gustafsson.

=== 2007 ===
- 26 June: The Ark, Pernilla Wahlgren, Benjamin Wahlgren, Maia Hirasawa, Electric Banana Band with Riltons Vänner, and Maria Möller.
- 3 July: Per Gessle, Måns Zelmerlöw, Frida Öhrn, Bengan Janson, Kalle Moraeus, Patrik Isaksson, Sussie Eriksson, and Henrik Dorsin.
- 10 July: Jerry Williams, Lasse Berghagen, Lasse Holm, Salem Al Fakir, Roland Cedermark, Tobias Blom, Sofia Lockwall, and Gabriella Lockwall.
- 17 July: Eldkvarn, Svante Thuresson, Sofia Karlsson, Markoolio, Mattias Enn, Florence Valentin.
- 24 July: Peter Jöback, Marie Lindberg, M.A. Numminen, Amy Diamond, Sahara Hotnights, Kjerstin Dellert.
- 31 July: E-Type, Fredrik Lycke, Alexander Lycke, Tomas von Brömssen, Marija Šerifović, Arne Qvick, Hanna Jämteby.
- 7 August: Benny Anderssons orkester (BAO), Nanne Grönvall, Robert Broberg, and Robert Gustafsson & Elias Andersson.

=== 2008 ===
- 24 June: Håkan Hellström, Arja Saijonmaa, Christer Sjögren, Miss Li, Bosse Parnevik, and Towa Carson.
- 1 July: Magnus Uggla, Sanna Nielsen, Peter Jöback, Eva Dahlgren, E.M.D., and Anton Zetterholm.
- 8 July: Lasse Stefanz, Amanda Jenssen, Brolle, 50 years of rock'n'roll (Little Gerhard, Rock-Olga, Rock-Ragge and Burken), and Maria Haukaas Storeng.
- 15 July: The Poodles, Torgny "Kingen" Karlsson, Rigmor Gustafsson & Christina Gustafsson, Wei Wei, and Owe Thörnqvist.
- 22 July: Adam Tensta, Andra Generationen, Veronica Maggio, Peter Harryson, Beata Harryson, and Vocal Six.
- 29 July: BWO, Abalone Dots, and Nina Söderquist.
- 5 August: Benny Anderssons orkester, Divine. Charlott Strandberg, Gunilla Backman, Sussie Eriksson, Tobias Ahlsell, Therese Löf-Amberg, Sara Dahlgren, Robin Olsson, Jesper Sjölander, Martin Redhe Nordh, Anna Andersson, Cecila Skarby, Robert Gustafsson, Annika Sjöö, Helen Sjöholm, and Tommy Körberg

=== 2009 ===
- 23 June: Måns Zelmerlöw, Tomas Ledin, Henrik Dorsin, Anna Maria Espinosa, and Owe Thörnqvist.
- 30 June: A Camp, Malena Ernman, Lisa Ekdahl, Johan Palm, Ann-Louise Hanson, and Mia Skäringer.
- 7 July: Magnus Uggla, Caroline af Ugglas, John ME, Claes Eriksson, Anne-Lie Rydé & Lotta Ramel, and Rolandz.
- 14 July: Alexander Rybak, Larz Kristerz, Marcus Birro, Elisabeth Andreassen, Pauline, Anna Book, and Stockholms Gosskör.
- 21 July: Lars Vegas Trio, Lili & Susie, Monica & Carl-Axel Dominique, Wille Crafoord, Magnus Carlsson, Jack Vreeswijk, Jonas Karlsson, and Kevin Borg.
- 28 July: After Dark, Malena Tuvung, Timo Räisänen, Per Myrberg, Glada Hudik-teatern, H.E.A.T., and Miss Li.
- 4 August: Svenska Lyxorkestern, Allmänna Sången, Markus Krunegård, Bosse Larsson, Lasse Berghagen, Björn Skifs, Sylvia Vrethammar, and Peter Lundblad.

=== 2010 ===
- 29 June: The Ark, MozART group Anna Bergendahl, Robert Broberg, and Carola.
- 6 July: The Playtones, Marie Kühler, Eric Saade, Marie Bergman, Mikael Wiehe, The Ten Tenors, Wille Craaford and Marika Willstedt.
- 13 July: Cotton Eye Joe Show, Darin, Timoteij, Movits!, Olivia Stevens, Kikki Danielsson.
- 20 July: Salem Al Fakir, Gunhild Carling, Drängarna, The Real Group, Thomas Di Leva, Oskar Linnros.
- 27 July: Mando Diao, Jonas Gardell, Christer Sjögren, Thorsten Flinck, Jasmine Kara, Lill Lindfors, and Idolerna.
- 3 August: The Baseballs, Huutajat, Jakob Hellman, Kjerstin Dellert, and Gösta Linderholm.
- 10 August: Jerry Williams, Ola Forssmed, Tove Styrke, Orup, Hanna Lindblad, Charlotte Perrelli and Magnus Carlsson.
- 17 August: Swedish Radio Symphony Orchestra, Måns Zelmerlöw and Lisette Pagler, Sarah Dawn Finer, Magnus Uggla, Fredrik Lycke and Jocke Bergström.

=== 2011 ===
- 28 June: Benny Anderssons Orkester, Lund Student Singers, Danny Saucedo, September, and Helen Sjöholm.
- 5 July: Håkan Hellström, Miriam Aïd, Siw Malmkvist, Ulrik Munther, The Moniker, and Hasse Andersson.
- 12 July: Veronica Maggio, Elisa's, Eric Amarillo, Sara Varga, Kjell Lönnå, Per Andersson, and Häxan Surtant.
- 19 July: Malena Ernman, Bo Kaspers Orkester, After Shave and Anders Eriksson, Petter, Vocalettes, Pernilla Andersson, and Lena-Maria Klingvall.
- 26 July: Hoffmaestro, Marika Willstedt and Angelica Alm, Carl Norén, Östen med Resten, Caroline Wennergren, and Eric Saade.
- 2 August: Timbuktu, Eva Eastwood, Patriks Combo, Hans-Erik Dyvik Husby, Fredrik Kempe, and Svante Thuresson.
- 9 August: Lena Philipsson, Sven-Ingvars, Staffan Percy, Albin Flinkas and Fredrik Meyer.
- 16 August: Swedish Radio Symphony Orchestra and Anders Berglund, Björn Skifs, Loa Falkman, and Peter Jöback.

=== 2012 ===
- 26 June: Adolf Fredrik's Girls' Choir, Agnes, Laleh, Magnus Uggla & Edith Backlund, and Sean Banan.
- 3 July: Basshunter, Dead by April, Erik Hassle, Molly Sandén, Pros & Cons, and Gunwer Bergkvist.
- 10 July: Bengt Sändh, Christina Lindberg, Diggiloo, Lasse Stefanz, Loreen, and Norlie & KKV.
- 17 July: Andreas Weise, Björn Ranelid & Sara Li, Herreys, Markus Krunegård, and Miss Li.
- 24 July: Amanda Fondell, Christer Björkman, Fibes, Oh Fibes!, Hagsätra Sport, Sten and Stanley, Tomas Ledin, and Icona Pop.
- 31 July: Darin, Linnea Henriksson, Monica Nielsen & Monica Dominique.
- 7 August: Cookies 'N' Beans, Panetoz, The Soundtrack of Our Lives, and Thorsten Flinck.
- 14 August: Gina Dirawi, Jerry Williams, Peter Lundblad, Petra Mede & Anna Granath, and Sarah Dawn Finer.

=== 2013 ===
- 25 June: Gyllene Tider, Zara Larsson, Passenger, Carola, and Eric Ericsons Kammarkör.
- 2 July: Oskar Linnros, Amanda Jenssen, Lisa Nilsson, Yohio, Per Andersson, Kjerstin Dellert, and Peter Jezewski.
- 9 July: Håkan Hellström, Louise Hoffsten, Anton Ewald, Grynet Molvig, and Skansen's Ukulele Orchestra.
- 16 July: Miriam Bryant, Rikard Wolff, Danny Saucedo, and Arvingarna.
- 23 July: Magnus Uggla, B.U.S!, Robin Stjernberg, Rolandz, Brynolf & Ljung, and Nic Schröder.
- 30 July: The Sounds, Kalle Moraeus, Sean Banan, Jonas Gardell, Lisa Miskovsky, Tensta Gospel Choir, and Trio me' Bumba.
- 6 August: Petter, Petra Marklund, Sofia Jannok, Lill-Babs
- 13 August: Mando Diao, Kim Cesarion, Flying Bach, Arja Saijonmaa, Edda Magnason

=== 2014 ===
- 24 June: Ace Wilder & Mariette Hansson, Niklas Strömstedt & Eric Bazilian, Malena Ernman & Loa Falkman, James Blunt, and Albin featuring Kristin Amparo & Mattias Andréasson.
- 1 July: Markus Krunegård, Nina Persson, Sanna Nielsen, Gunhild Carling, Seinabo Sey, and Jany Schella.
- 8 July: Elisas, The Fooo, Björn Skifs, Linda Pira, and Jon Henrik Fjällgren.
- 15 July: Laleh, Jill Johnson & Doug Seegers, Annika Herlitz, The Real Group, Ison & Fille.
- 22 July: Electric Banana Band, Darin, Titiyo, and Vera Nord.
- 29 July: Weeping Willows, Ola Salo, Alcazar, Panetoz, and Stefan Nilsson & Anna Stadling & Lidingö Motettkör.
- 5 August: Takida, Orup, Linnea Henriksson, Timbuktu, and John de Sohn
- 12 August: Jenny Wilson, Icona Pop, John Martin, and Lise & Gertrud.

=== 2015 ===
- 23 June: Carola, Hasse Andersson, Panetoz
- 30 June: Norlie & KKV, Måns Zelmerlöw, Sabina Ddumba, Tomas Ledin
- 7 July: Bo Kaspers Orkester, Danny Saucedo, Isa, Jill Johnson & Doug Seegers, Magnus Carlsson
- 14 July: Darin, Jakob Karlberg, Titti Sjöblom, Zara Larsson, Brolle & Nanne Grönvall
- 21 July: Dinah Nah, Ida LaFontaine, Kjell Lönnå & Sundsvalls Kammarkör, Lasse Stefanz & Mikael Wiehe, Ulrik Munther
- 28 July: Alcazar, Gunilla Backman, Jessica Andersson & Charlotte Perrelli, Svante Thuresson & Pernilla Andersson, Viktor Olsson, IJustWantToBeCool
- 4 August: Cajsa Stina Åkerström, Christina Nilsson, Bruno Mitsogiannis, Peter Johansson, David Lindgren, Robert Rydberg, Petter, Say Lou Lou
- 11 August: Sveriges Radios Symfoniorkester, Lena Philipsson, Tommy Körberg, Rigmor Gustafsson & Viktoria Tolstoy, Robert Noack & Maria Ylipää

=== 2016 ===
- 28 June: BAO, Frans and Miriam Bryant.
- 5 July: Lisa Nilsson, Daniel Adams-Ray, Malena Ernman and Oscar Zia.
- 12 July: Laleh, Marcus & Martinus, Daniel Norberg, Niklas Strömstedt and Elin Rombo.
- 19 July: SaRaha, Anders Glenmark, Josefin Johansson, Orup, Solala and Sonja Aldén.
- 26 July: Veronica Maggio, Jamala and Smith & Thell.
- 2 August: LÉON, Martin Stenmarck, Ola Aurell and Systerpolskan.
- 9 August: Maria Andersson, Sten & Stanley, Bob Hund and Lill-Babs.
- 16 August: Zara Larsson, Lill Lindfors and John Lundvik, Frances and Tensta Gospel Choir.

=== 2020 ===
- 21 July: Daniel Adams-Ray, The Boppers, Peg Parnevik and Blenda Nkímyá

=== 2021 ===
- 6 July: Sabina Ddumba, Eric Saade, Lena Jonsson Trio and Uno Svenningsson.
- 13 July: Eva Rydberg & Ewa Roos, Takida, Loreen, and Thomas Stenström.
- 20 July: Jelassi, Frida Öhrn, Newkid, Vikingarna and Brynolf & Ljung.
- 27 July: Arvingarna, Eagle-Eye Cherry, Cherrie and Tusse.
- 3 August: Sandro Cavazza, Charlotte Perrelli, Darin and Tove Styrke.
- 10 August: Nils Landgren, Viktoria Tolstoy, Ida Sand, Smith & Thell, Daniela Rathana, Maria Möller, Bobbysocks and Benjamin Ingrosso (with guest artists Cherrie, Tommy Körberg and Sara Zacharias).
- 17 August: Maja Francis, Chris Kläfford, Peter Jöback, Timbuktu and Emma Sventelius.

=== 2022 ===
- 28 June : The Ark, Cornelia Jakobs, Jireel, Benson Boone & Jill Johnsson
- 5 july : Tomas Ledin, Åsa Jinder, Janice & Theoz
- 12 July: Medina, Eric Bibb & Myra Granberg
- 19 July: Sahara Hotnights, Casanovas, Tone Sekelius & Linnea Henriksson
- 26 july: Hanna Ferm and Junie, Moonica Mac, Nanne Grönvall, Hasse Andersson & Thomas Stenström
- 2 August: Mikael Wiehe, Alba August, A36, Afro-Dite
- 9 August : Iris Bergcrantz, Marcus and Martinus & Albin Lee Meldau
- 15 August : Tommy Körberg, Ella Tiritiello & Siw Malmqvist

=== 2023 ===
- 27 June: Mando Diao, Laleh, Loreen, Lasse Stefanz, Louisiana Avenue
- 4 July : Zara Larsson, Sven-Ingvars, Hooja, Jackie Mere
- 11 July: Måns Zelmerlöw, Panetoz, Olivia Lobato, Erica & Cecilia, Malena Ernman and Rickard Söderberg
- 18 July: Carola, Hanna Hedlund, Lucianoz, Lova
- 25 July: Stor, Kiana, Lancelot, Thomas Stenström
- 1 August: Oscar Zia, Stefan Sundström, Admira Thunderpussy, Johar and Josefin
- 8 August: Darin, Nordman, Naod
- 15 August: Victor Leksell, Helen Sjöholm & Tommy Körberg, David Ritschard, Benjamin Ingrosso

=== 2024 ===
- 25 June: Molly Hammar, Albin Lee Meldau, Tina Ahlin & Malena Ernman with Orsa Spelman, Marcus & Martinus and ADAAM.
- 2 July: Peg Parnevik, Mange Schmidt & Byz, Omar Rudberg and Tomas Ledin.
- 9 July: Jill & The Johnsons, Timo Räisanen, Oscar Zia & Parham and Tommy Nilsson.
- 16 July: Herreys, Peter Jöback, Zoe Lobos and Fröken Snusk.
- 23 July: Maja Francis, Smash Into Pieces, Titti Sjöblom, Ehrling Eliasson, Linda Petersson and Norlie & KKV.
- 30 July: Uno Svenningsson, Elisabeth Andreassen & Lotta Engberg, Ellen Krauss and LIAMOO.
- 6 August: Miss Li, Dream Girls, Anji & Lisa Ekdahl, Christer Sjögren and Simon Superti.
- 13 August: Orup, Isak Danielson, Miriam Bryant and Dasha.

=== 2025 ===
- 24 June: KAJ, Zara Larsson, Medina and Daniela Rathana.
- 1 July: Laleh, Darin, Ida-Lova and Dolly Style.
- 8 July: Tjuvjakt, SCARLET, Viktor Norén & Linus Wahlgren and Anis Don Demina.
- 15 July: Johnossi, Ison & Fille, Meira Omar, Niklas Strömstedt & Johanna Frostling and Jan Rippe & Per Fritzell.
- 22 July: Lina Hedlund, Banna Sona Band and Brynolf & Ljung.
- 29 July: Victor Leksell, Emmalisa Hallander and ADAAM & Greekazo.
- 5 August: Ola Salo & Peter Jöback, Thomas Stenström, Titiyo and Felicia Takman.
- 12 August: Seinabo Sey, Lisa Nilsson, Magnus Uggla, Lucas Krüger, Jessica Marberger and Hanna Hedlund & Emilie Evbäck.

=== 2026 ===
- 23 June: Hooja, Felicia, Petra Marklund, Basshunter & Käärijä, De Vet Du and Thomas Stenström.
- 30 June: Sanna Nielsen, Naod & Greekazo, Infinite Mass, Molly Hammar, Brandsta City Släckers, Siw Malmkvist, Ewa Roos, Arja Saijonmaa, Babsan, Ann-Louise Hanson and Electric Banana Band.
- 7 July: Valter Nilsson, Lilla Al Fadji, Noll2, Tove Styrke and Sten & Stanley.
- 14 July: Sahara Hotnights, Peg Parnevik, Simon Superti, Medina, Staffan Hellstrand and Greczula.
- 21 July: Yusuf/Cat Stevens, The Soundtrack of Our Lives, Fanny Avonne, Familjen, STOR & Anna Carolina and Svullo (Fredrik Lexfors).
- 28 July: The Ark, Disco Inferno, Tjuvjakt, Shima Niavarani, Torka aldrig tårar utan handskar (Valdemar Wahlbeck and Martin Stokke Mathiesen), DARA.
- 4 August: Oskar Linnros, Icona Pop, Newkid, Lasse Holm and Linda Lampenius & Pete Parkkonen.
- 11 August: Eva Dahlgren, Lena Philipsson, A*Teens, Nanne & Bettan and Carola.

== See also ==
- Sommarkrysset
- Lotta på Liseberg, a sing-along show held in Gothenburg, Sweden
- Allsang på grensen, an inspired Norwegian TV show held in Halden, Norway that aired from 2007 to 2022
