= Edward af Sillén =

Swedish screenwriter

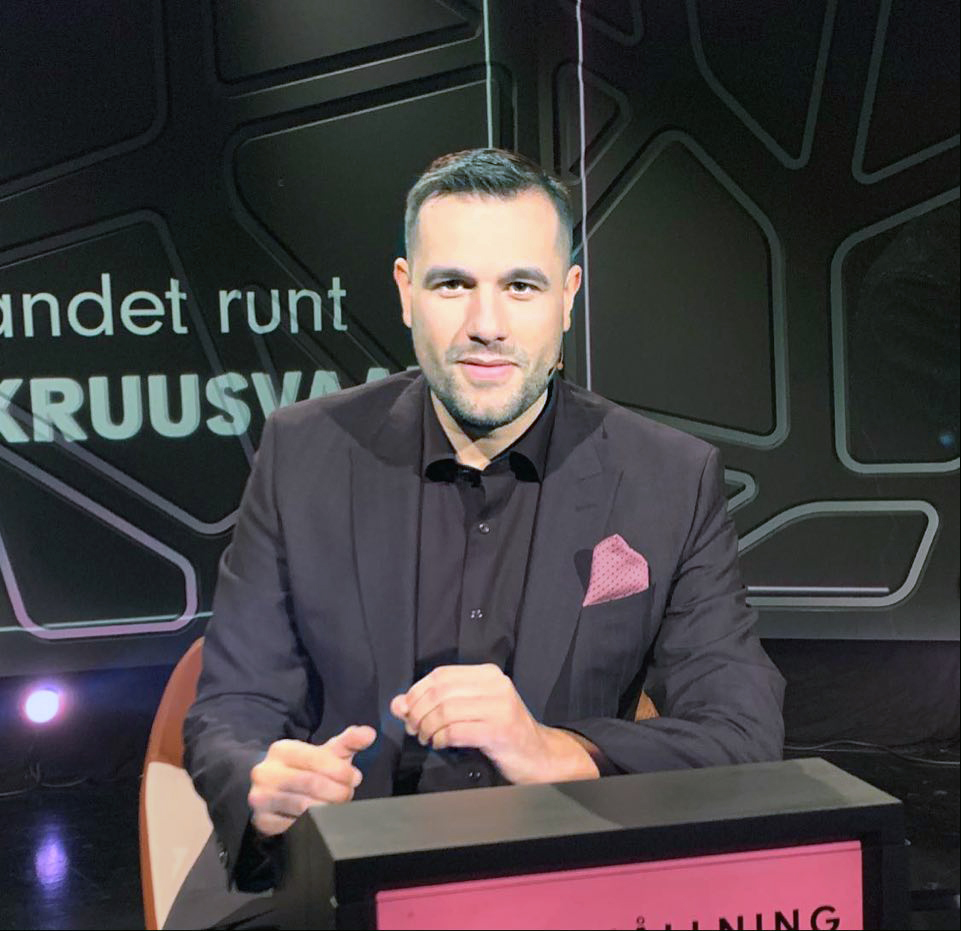
- Af Sillén in the tv-show MUREN, March 2021
- Born: 25 September 1982 (age 43); Blumenau, Santa Catarina, southern Brazil
- Occupations: Screenwriter, director
- Years active: 2004−present

Edward af Sillén (born 25 September 1982) is a Swedish screenwriter and director for stage, film and TV. He has translated and directed numerous successful theatre shows including Twelfth Night by William Shakespeare, The Drowsy Chaperone, Bull and Cock by Mike Bartlett, Torch Song Trilogy by Harvey Fierstein, Shirley Valentine by Willy Russell, and Art by Yasmina Reza.

Af Sillén has worked on Melodifestivalen and the Eurovision Song Contest as a director, commentator and screenwriter, including in the Eurovision Song Contest 2016 where he wrote and directed the interval act "Love Love Peace Peace" with Fredrik Kempe. Following on from writing his first film Medicinen, his second writing Holy Mess became the biggest Swedish film of 2015. In 2019, he directed A Piece of My Heart, a jukebox musical film based on the music of Tomas Ledin and starring Malin Akerman, which was nominated for an Audience Award at the Guldbagge Awards.

== Career ==
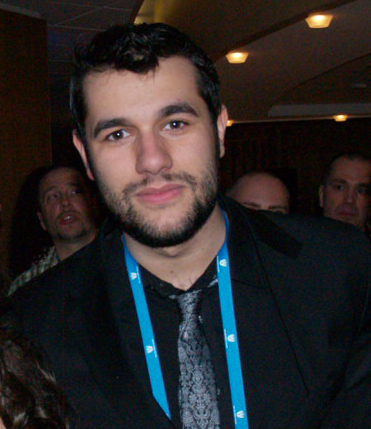
Edward af Sillén (2009)

Edward started his career as an actor. Performing both at the Lorensbergsteatern and Stockholm National Theatre. Aged 18, he did stand-up comedy. Hungry to work in the creative side of entertainment and theatre, he knew he could get his foot in the door as an actor.

=== Film ===
2014 saw Af Sillén write his first feature film Medicinen. Based on the 2009 book of the same name, written by Hans Koppel (pseudonym Petter Lidbeck). The book was reworked into a screenplay by Af Sillén and his writing partner Daniel Réhn. An all-star cast including Ewa Fröling and Maria Lundqvist, was led by Helena Bergström.

Af Sillén’s second film was the Swedish comedy Holy Mess, again written with Daniel Réhn and starring Robert Gustafsson, Maria Lundqvist and Helena Bergström. Seen by 77,736 people during its premiere weekend, it broke records with the biggest opening for a Swedish film in 2015. It went on to become the most popular Swedish film of 2015, and grossed over $8 million at the box office. The film won Film of the Year at the QX Gaygala 2016.

In December 2019, Af Sillén directed his third and biggest feature film, A Piece of My Heart, a jukebox musical based on the music of Tomas Ledin. The film stars Malin Akerman as Isabella, a lead business woman in the financial district of Stockholm, who returns home to celebrate her father's birthday.

Af Sillén is set to return to cinema direction in his upcoming film Ett sista race, which he also wrote the script for, working once again with Malin Akerman and David Hellenius. The film is based on the Norwegian film Børning.

=== Theatre ===
Af Sillén’s theatrical work includes Swedish translations of Steel Magnolias, Torch Song Trilogy by Harvey Fierstein, Rock of Ages and The Ladykillers. He directed Shakespeare’s Twelfth Night, the play V.D. and the musical Hair at Stockholm’s National Theatre. His direction of Priscilla the Musical was followed by his translation and direction of the Tony Award winning musical The Drowsy Chaperone in 2015. That same year Af Sillén directed. as well as translated the plays Rumors and the Laurence Olivier Award winner Cock.

Af Sillén has written and directed national tours for major Swedish artists such as Tomas Ledin, Ola Salo and Peter Jöback. He teamed up with Alcazar to create their first full production concert. Disco Defenders was a greatest hits residency which début in the Rondo at Lisberg, Gothenburg Summer 2015. The production moved to Hamburger Börs, Stockholm in Winter 2015. After another sell out run, the group took the show on a national tour then returned to Hamburger Börs in 2016.

=== Television ===
2004 brought Af Sillén's screenwriting breakthrough with the script for host Maria Lundqvist at the Guldbagge Awards, the Swedish equivalent of the Academy Awards. He returned in 2007 not only as Sissela Kyle’s scriptwriter, but as director of the show live on SVT.

Af Sillén was recruited by Melodifestivalen supervisor Christer Björkman to write and direct the 2009 edition. His mix of humour, music and sparkle saw him return in 2010, 2012 and 2013. After a two-year break, he came back in 2016 to much acclaim. His parody sketch song "Här står jag", performed by Charlotte Perrelli, topped the Swedish iTunes chart. To boost declining viewer figures, Af Sillén was hired as a consultant for the 2019 edition. In 2024, he was inducted into the Melodifestivalen Hall of Fame by SVT.

A lifelong lover of the Eurovision Song Contest, Af Sillén became the Swedish commentator for SVT in 2009. The following year he wrote the script for his first contest in 2010. He has continued to serve as commentator since, with the exceptions of the 2013 and 2016 contests, held in Malmö and Stockholm respectively, for which he wrote the script. In 2015, the BBC hired him to co-write the script of Eurovision Song Contest's Greatest Hits, a special show to commemorate the 60th edition of Eurovision. The interval act "Love Love Peace Peace", written by Af Sillén and performed by presenters Petra Mede and Måns Zelmerlöw during the final of the 2016 contest, became a highlight of the show. The Independent named it the "ultimate interval act, somehow even upstaging Justin Timberlake himself". Buzzfeed commented that the presenters were the "best thing about this year's contest". Af Sillén also wrote the script for the Eurovision Song Contest 2024 in Malmö.

In 2021, Af Sillén served as a judge on the 11th and 12th series of TV4's Talang, the Swedish version of the Got Talent franchise.

== Personal life ==
Edward af Sillén is openly gay. Born in Brazil he was adopted by a Swedish father and an American mother.

== Work ==
=== Film ===
Year	Title	Role
2014	Medicinen	Screenwriter
2015	En underbar jävla jul	Screenwriter
2019	En del av mitt hjärta	Director
2023	Ett sista race	Director and screenwriter

=== Theatre ===
Year	Title	Role	Note
2005–2018	QX Gaygala	Writer	
2006–2010	R.E.A.	Writer	Hamburger Börs
2006	Det är jul igen by Maria Möller	Director and writer	Intiman
2008	Blommor av stål (Steel Magnolias)	Translator	Vasateatern
2011	Tomas Ledin Showtime	Director and writer	Rondo (Gothenburg), Cirkus (Stockholm) and national tour
2011	Trettondagsafton (Twelfth Night by William Shakespeare)	Director	Stockholms Stadsteater
2011	Hair	Director	Stockholms Stadsteater
2012	I Love Musicals by Peter Jöback	Director and writer	National tour
2013	Arnould (Torch Song Trilogy by Harvey Fierstein)	Translator	Stockholms Stadsteater
2013	Rock of Ages	Translator	China Teatern
2013	Priscilla, Queen of the Desert the Musical	Director	Göta Lejon
2014	V.D.	Director	Stockholms Stadsteater
2014	Alcazar Disco Defenders	Director and writer	Rondo (Gothenburg), Hamburger Börs (Stockholm) and national tour
2015	Förklädet (The Drowsy Chaperone)	Director and translator	Göta Lejon
2015	Skvaller (Rumors)	Director and translator	Uppsala Stadsteater
2015	Cockfight (Cock)	Director and translator	Stockholms Stadsteater
2015	Ladykillers	Translator	Oscarsteatern
2016	Rakt ner i fickan (Cash on Delivery by Michael Cooney)	Director and translator	Krusenstiernska Teatern
2017	Bull	Director and translator	Kulturhuset Stadsteatern
2017	Shirley Valentine	Director and translator	Maximteatern
2018	Så som i himmelen	Co-writer	Oscarsteatern and Copenhagen Opera House
2019	Ola Salo - It Takes a Fool to Remain Sane	Director	Rondo (Gothenburg)
2019	Häxorna i Eastwick (The Witches of Eastwick)	Director and translator	Cirkus (Stockholm)
2019	Art by Yasmina Reza	Director and translator	Hotel Rival (Stockholm)
2019	Trassel (Out of Order) by Ray Cooney	Director and translator	Krusenstiernska gården (Stockholm)
2020	Pernilla Wahlgren har Hybris	Director and writer	Hotel Rival (Stockholm) and National Tour
2020	Tomten och Bocken (starring Måns Zelmerlöw and Per Andersson)	Director	Hamburger Börs (Stockholm)
2021	Pappor på prov (It Runs in the Family) by Ray Cooney	Director and translator	Krusenstiernska gården (Stockholm)
2022	Brynolf & Ljung Stalker	Director	Hotel Rival (Stockholm), National Tour and New World Stages
2022	Tootsie	Director	Oscarsteatern
2023	Peter Pan Goes Wrong	Director	Cirkus
2023	Änglagård (House of Angels)	Co-writer and director	Oscarsteatern

=== Television ===
==== Production credits ====
Year	Title	Role	Note
2004	Guldbaggegalan	Screenwriter	Hosted by Maria Lundqvist
2007	Guldbaggegalan	Director and screenwriter	Hosted by Sissela Kyle
2009	Roast på Berns	Writer	For Kanal 5
2009	Melodifestivalen 2009	Scriptwriter	Hosted by Petra Mede
2010	Melodifestivalen 2010	Scriptwriter	Hosted by Måns Zelmerlöw, Christine Meltzer and Dolph Lundgren
2010	Eurovision Song Contest 2010	Scriptwriter	Hosted by Erik Solbakken, Haddy N'jie and Nadia Hasnaoui
2012	Melodifestivalen 2012	Scriptwriter	Hosted by Gina Dirawi, Sarah Dawn Finer and Helena Bergström
2013	Melodifestivalen 2013	Scriptwriter	Hosted by Gina Dirawi and Danny Saucedo
2013	Eurovision Song Contest 2013	Scriptwriter	For SVT, hosted by Petra Mede
2015	Eurovision Song Contest's Greatest Hits	Co-scriptwriter	For the BBC, hosted by Graham Norton and Petra Mede
2016	Melodifestivalen 2016	Scriptwriter	Hosted by Gina Dirawi (all shows), Petra Mede (heat 1), Henrik Schyffert (heat 3), Sarah Dawn Finer (heat 4), Ola Salo, Peter Jöback (second chance) and William Spetz (final)
2016	Eurovision Song Contest 2016	Scriptwriter	Hosted by Petra Mede and Måns Zelmerlöw
2017	Uuden Musiikin Kilpailu	Swedish jury spokesperson	
2018	Eurovision: You Decide	Screenwriter	Hosted by Mel Giedroyc and Måns Zelmerlöw
2019	Eurovision: You Decide	Screenwriter	Hosted by Mel Giedroyc and Måns Zelmerlöw
2019	Melodifestivalen 2019	Consultant and adviser	Hosted by Sarah Dawn Finer, Kodjo Akolor, Marika Carlsson and Eric Saade
2020–present	Muren	Entertainment expert	
2021–present	Masked Singer Sverige	Director	
2021–2022	Talang	Judge	For TV4 with Sarah Dawn Finer, Bianca Ingrosso and David Batra
2022	Årets quiz	Host	
2024	Eurovision Song Contest 2024	Scriptwriter	Hosted by Petra Mede and Malin Akerman

==== Eurovision Song Contest commentary ====
Year	Co-commentator
2009	Shirley Clamp
2010	Christine Meltzer
2011	Hélène Benno
2012	Gina Dirawi
2014	Malin Olsson
2015	Sanna Nielsen
2017	Måns Zelmerlöw
2018	Sanna Nielsen
2019	Charlotte Perrelli
2021	Christer Björkman
2022	Linnea Henriksson
2023	Måns Zelmerlöw
2024	Tina Mehrafzoon
2025	Petra Mede

=== Accolades ===
==== Melodifestivalen ====
Year	Award
2024	Hall of Fame

==== Guldbagge Awards ====
Year	Award	Result
2020	Guldbaggens publikpris (Audience Award) for A Piece of My Heart	Nominated

==== QX Gaygala ====
Year	Award	Result
2014	TV of the Year for the Eurovision Song Contest 2013	Won
2016	Film of the Year for Holy Mess, Stage of the Year for Alcazar Disco Defenders	Won
2021	TV Star of the Year	Nominated
2021	Stage of the Year for Hybris starring Pernilla Wahlgren	Nominated
2024	Stage of the Year for Änglagård	Won

Preceded by Kristian Luuk	Eurovision Song Contest Swedish commentator 2009–2012	Succeeded by Josefine Sundström
Preceded by Josefine Sundström	Eurovision Song Contest Swedish commentator 2014–2015	Succeeded by Lotta Bromé
Preceded by Lotta Bromé	Eurovision Song Contest Swedish commentator 2017–present	Succeeded by Incumbent
