= Gunilla Backman =

Swedish singer

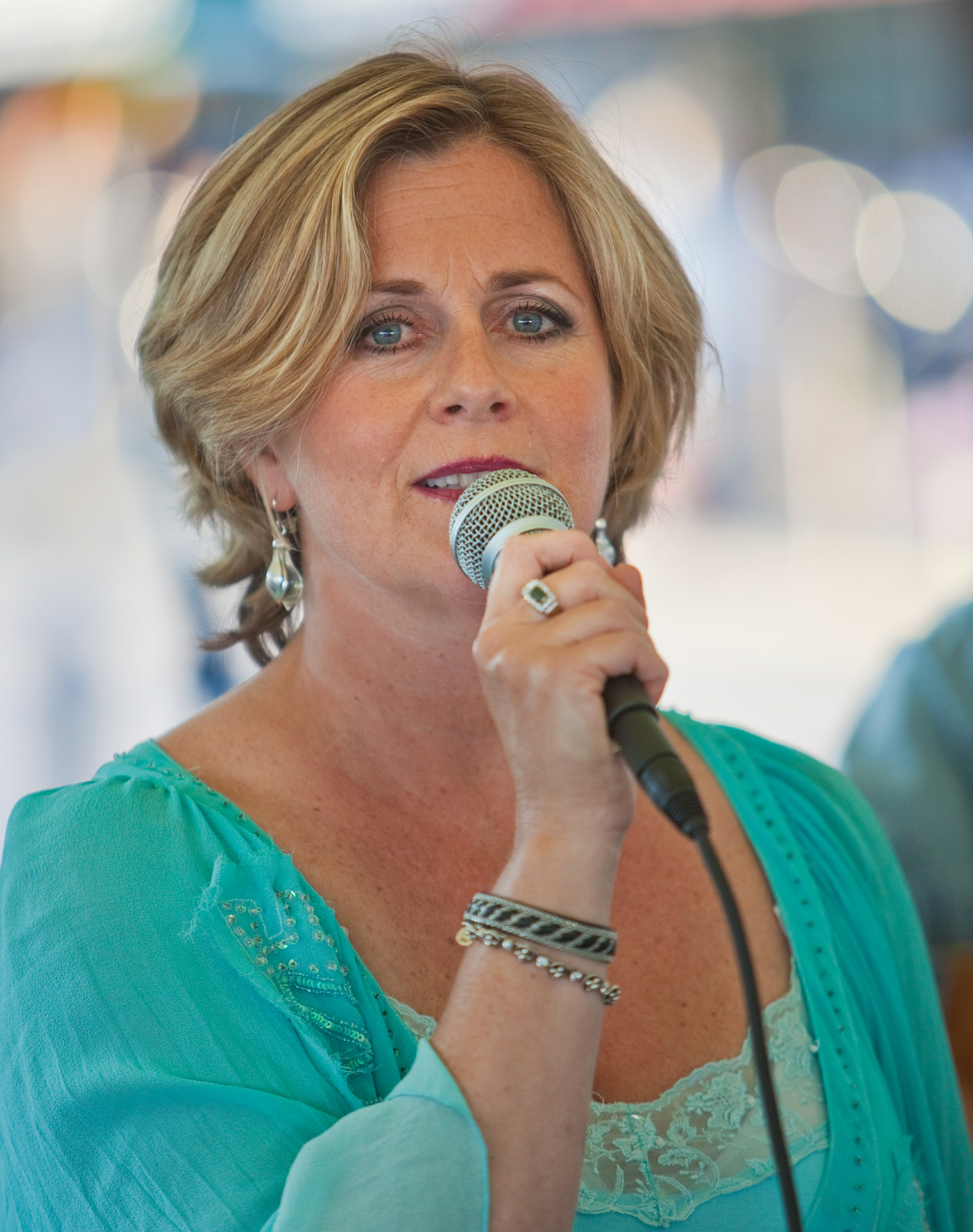
- Backman in 2012

Background information
- Born: Gunilla Katarina Backman; 18 June 1965 (age 61)
- Origin: Stockholm, Sweden
- Genres: Musical, Rock
- Website: http://gunillabackman.com/

Gunilla Katarina Backman (born 18 June 1965) is a Swedish singer, actress, and musical artist.

== Early life and career ==
Backman comes from a musical family and studied classical ballet from 1972 until 1982 at Kungliga Teaterns balettskola and at the Balettakademien, Statens dansskola and Cullbergbaletten. She attended Adolf Fredrik's Music School and studied song at the age of seventeen, when she debuted in the role of Liesl in the musical Sound of Music at Folkan. At the same theater she also acted in the children's play Snövit och de sju dvärgarna about Snow White. In both productions she got to know her co-star Peter Jöback, with whom she has collaborated with several times. After these works, she has worked primarily within song and musicals.

== Career ==
In 1984, she toured with Carola Häggkvist, and along with singer Henriette Johnsson, she started the pop duo Katz. The group toured Europe and she also recorded solo singles in Italy in 1989. In 1990, she got the role of Cosette in the musical Les Misérables at Cirkus in Stockholm. She has been a part of the ensemble for over 1000 plays of the musical both in Sweden, Germany and London. In 1992, she had the lead role of Maria in West Side Story at the National Swedish Touring Theatre, and after that, she acted in a revue with Bosse Parnevik, Monica Zetterlund and others.

In 1994, she acted in Ingmar Bergman's special production of Shakespeare's En vintersaga at the Royal Dramatic Theatre and she also acted in the musical Elvira Madigan at Riksteatern. In 1996, she started several years of intensive international work with Andrew Lloyd Webber's musical Sunset Boulevard in the German city of Niedernhausen. She has since played roles in Les Misérables in Germany and London, Miss Saigon in London, a concert tour in South Africa and Chess in Denmark.

In 2002, she returned to Stockholm and Oscarsteatern to act as the title role of Greta Garbo in Garbo The Musical, followed by her big breakthrough role as Donna, in the Swedish version of the musical Mamma Mia! at Cirkus between 2005 and 2007. She won the award Guldmasken for this role. In 2009, she participated in the show Primadonnor at Hamburger Börs along with Charlott Strandberg and Sussie Eriksson. Between 2010 and 2011, she played the lead role as Norma Desmond in the Göteborgsoperan musical Sunset Boulevard.

In 2012, she played Mary Magdalene in the musical Jesus Christ Superstar along with Ola Salo at Göta Lejon in Stockholm. In 2013, she played Desiree Armfledt in Stephen Sondeheim's Sommarnattens leende at Malmö Opera. Backman has from time to time been part of Rhapsody in Rock, also in the Ted Gärdestad celebration tour Sol, vind & vatten in 2008. In 2013, she participated in the television recorded arena tour I Love Musicals along with Peter Jöback. She has made several concerts with Malmö Brandkårs Musikkår along with Jan Malmsjö.

Backman has participated in a number of television shows like Allsång på Skansen broadcast on SVT, Allsång på Liseberg with Lotta Engberg on TV4, TV-huset, Så ska det låta, Sing along, Doobidoo, Nationaldagen and Nyårsfirande from Skansen. She also had a part in the Melodifestivalmusikalen, which was the break show at Melodifestivalen 2007.

== Discography ==
- 2005 – Mamma Mia!
- 2006 – Nära mig
- 2006 – Julens ljus
- 2006 – Julskivan 2006
- 2010 – Gunilla Backman Sings Andrew Lloyd Webber

== Filmography ==
- Babar och hans vänner (voice)
- Tummelisa (voice)
