= Boris Lindqvist =

Swedish singer and musician

- Also known as: Rock-Boris
- Born: Karl Boris Lennart Lindqvist; 22 December 1940; Stockholm, Sweden
- Died: 15 October 2017 (aged 76) Cyprus
- Genres: Rock, jazz
- Years active: 1957–2005
- Formerly of: Rockfolket, Boris Jazz 'n' Roll Band, Rock-Olga, Leif Björklund, Little Gerhard, The Telstars

Karl Boris Lennart Lindqvist (22 December 1940 – 15 October 2017) was a Swedish singer and musician.

== Biography ==
Lindqvist was born in Stockholm. In the late 1950s, as Rock-Boris, he gained fame as one of Sweden's first rock and roll performers. In the 1960s, Lindqvist also started performing jazz and schlager. He was the lead singer of the group The Telstars who had a hit with the song "Håll dig till höger, Svensson" ('Keep to the right, Svensson') in connection with Dagen H in 1967. Later, Lindqvist started focusing on jazz and formed his own jazz group, called Boris Jazz 'n' Roll Band. In the early 2000s, Lindqvist moved to Cyprus, and in 2005 he embarked on a farewell tour.

Lindqvist died in October 2017 at the age of 76.
