= Maria Möller =

Swedish singer, actress, comedian, and imitator

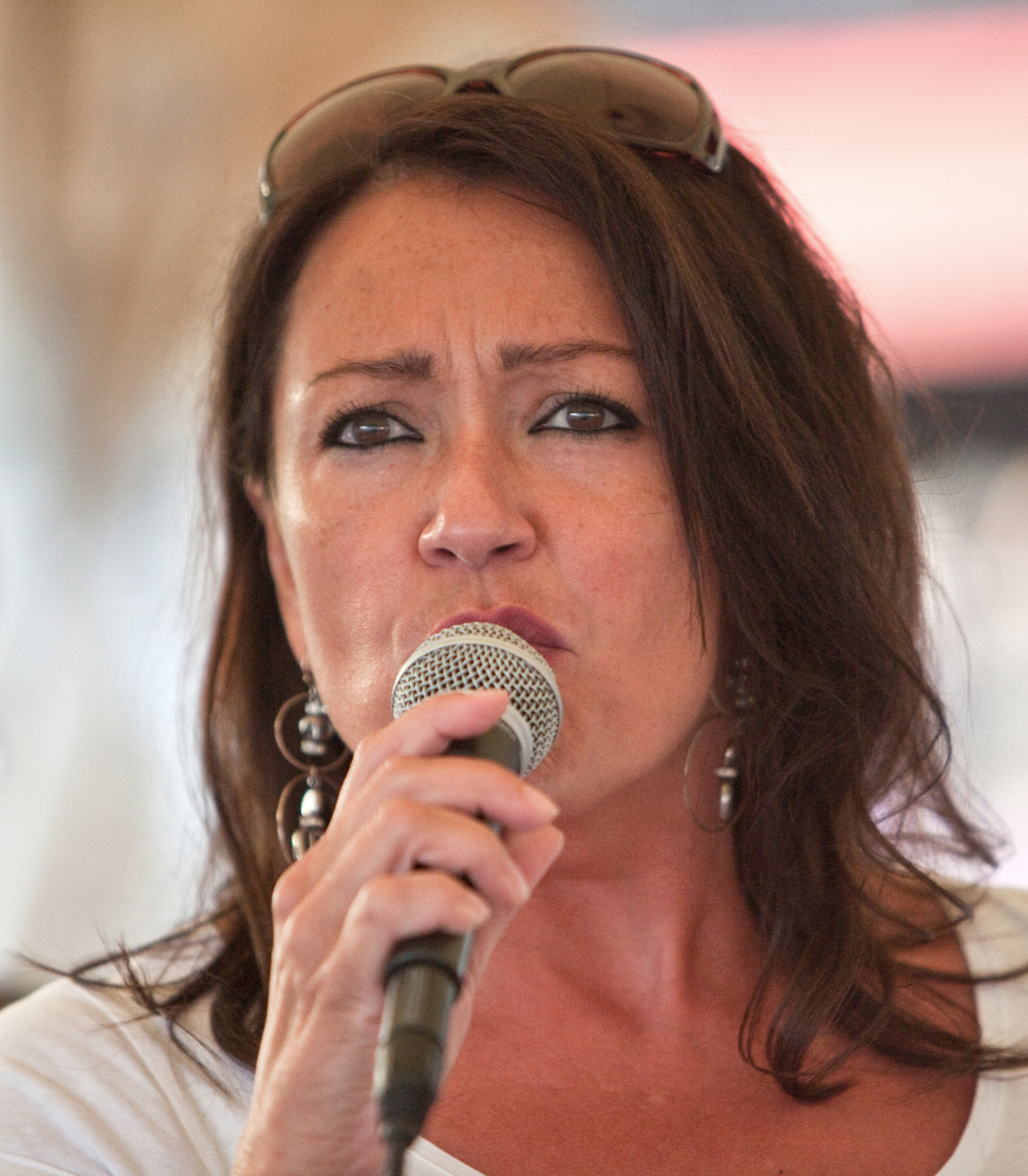
Maria Möller in 2012

Maria Möller (born Andersson, 29 October 1965) is a Swedish singer, actress, comedian, and imitator. Möller has been involved with theater groups in a variety of capacities. She has been an assistant director, tour leader, suffler, props manager, and actress. She made her acting debut in the Henning Mankell play Prinsen och Tiggaren at Västerbottensteatern, where she worked between 1984 and 1988. After that, she worked for six years at Kronobergsteatern in Växjö.

Möller is a classically trained mezzo-soprano and soloist. Her repertoire ranges from opera to rock. She has worked at the GöteborgsOperan and Göteborgs Stadsteater. She has participated in the musicals Kristina från Duvemåla, The Sound of Music, Songs for a New World, and Chess at Cirkus in Stockholm.

In 2005 and 2006, she participated in the comedy stage show R.E.A. (Roligt Elakt Aktuellt) at Hamburger Börs. Möller made her big breakthrough in 2005 at the singing show Allsång på Skansen, which was broadcast on SVT, where she imitated several Swedish celebrities. Möller also performed in a small role in the film Populärmusik från Vittula. She is touring in 2015 with the show "Midvinter" along with musicians Michael Blomqvist, Fredrik Landh, and Pär Hermansson. In the show, she performs personal interpretations of music she likes, mixed with imitations and comedic features. In February 2015, Möller performed at the Mappie-gala hosted by the M-magasin. The gala was aired live on TV4 Play. In 2006, Möller presented an episode of the Sveriges Radio show Sommar i P1.
