= After Us =

After Us can refer to

- After Us (album), an album by Swedish band Weeping Willows
- After Us (video game), a 2023 action-adventure video game
