= Thomas Stenström =

Swedish artist, singer and songwriter (born 1988)

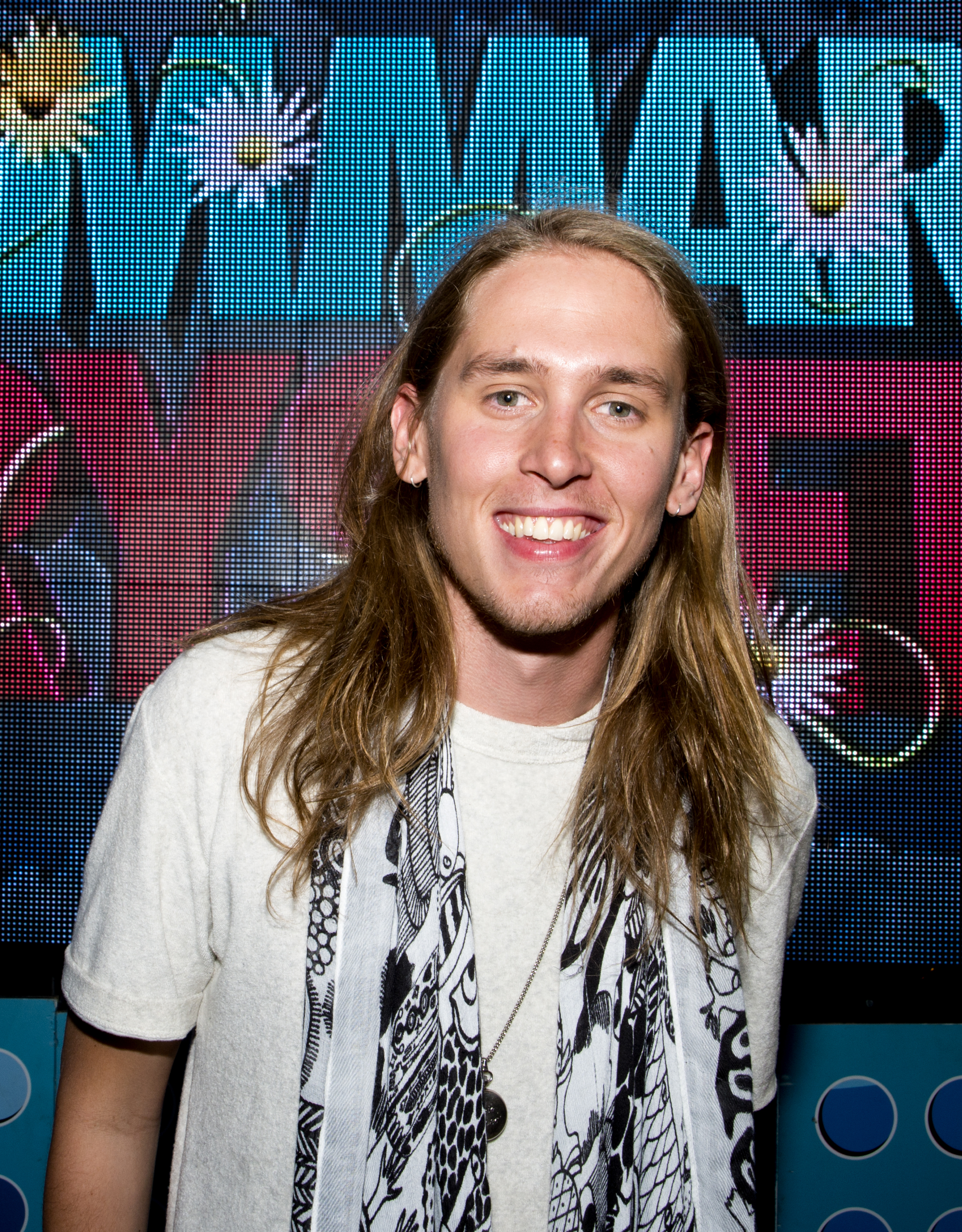
- Stenström at Sommarkrysset in July 2014.

Background information
- Born: January 19, 1988 (age 38); Uddevalla, Sweden
- Genres: pop
- Instrument: vocals
- Label: Sony Music
- Website: https://www.thomasstenstrom.se

Karl Thomas Stenström (born January 19, 1988), is a Swedish artist, singer and songwriter. He is best known for his charting single "Slå mig hårt i ansiktet". He has released three albums: Nåt annat, nån annanstans (2012), Fulkultur (2014) and Rör inte min kompis! (2017).

== Biography ==
Thomas Stenström grew up in Uddevalla. At the age of 10, he began to make music at home, and in his 20's he started taking his music career more serious, also writing song lyrics in Swedish instead of English. As a teenager, he'd also played soccer.

In 2010 he was awarded the Ted Gärdestad Scholarship and in 2011 released his second single "Detsamma" followed by "Krossade drömmar" and "Full av liv". The debut album Nåt annat, nån annanstans was released on June 13, 2012. In 2014, he took part in Sommarkrysset a Swedish television program broadcast live from the Gröna Lund amusement park in Stockholm during the summer. The same August he released his second album Fulkultur.

In 2025 he appeared on Allsång på Skansen with Maja Francis on August 6.

== Discography ==
=== Albums ===
Year	Album	Peak positions	Certification
Year	Album	SWE	Certification
2012	Nåt annat, nån annanstans	—	
2014	Fulkultur	6	Gold
2017	Rör inte min kompis!	26	
2019	Dreamer	38	
2021	Spring Baby Spring	2	Gold
2023	Superlativ 97	1	Platinum
2025	Sverige	4	
2025	Live på Zinkensdamm	29	

=== EPs ===
Year	Album	Peak position
Year	Album	SWE
2019	Uddevala Dreamer	15
2021	Så mycket bättre 2021 – Tolkningarna	5

=== Singles ===
Title	Year	Peak positions	Album
Title	Year	SWE	Album
"Detsamma"	2012	—	Nåt annat, nån annanstans
"Full av liv"	2012	—	Nåt annat, nån annanstans
"Krossade drömmar"	2012	—	Nåt annat, nån annanstans
"Dansen före döden"	2013	—	Non-album single
"Slå mig hårt i ansiktet"	2014	11	Fulkultur
"Det är inte lätt att leva"	2015	—	Non-album single
"Allt jag har"	2016	— (Note: "Allt jag har" did not enter the Swedish Singles Chart, but peaked at number two on the Swedish Heatseeker chart.)	Rör inte min kompis!
"Det här är inte mitt land" (featuring Silvana Imam)	2016	—	Rör inte min kompis!
"Palma de Mallorca"	2017	—	Non-album single
"Förlorare utan chans" (with Den svenska björnstammen)	2017	— (Note: "Förlorare utan chans" did not enter the Swedish Singles Chart, but peaked at number six on the Swedish Heatseeker chart.)	Non-album single
"På en vacker dag" (featuring Amanda Jenssen)	2017	—	Rör inte min kompis!
"Adiós amigos"	2019	— (Note: "Adiós amigos" did not enter the Swedish Singellista Chart, but peaked at number 12 on the Swedish Heatseeker Chart.)	Uddevalla Dreamer
"Himlen över city"	2019	75	Uddevalla Dreamer
"Bam Bam"	2019	— (Note: "Bam Bam" did not enter the Swedish Singellista Chart, but peaked at number 17 on the Swedish Heatseeker Chart.)	Uddevalla Dreamer
"Nån annan"	2019	50	Dreamer
"Aldrig vågat"	2019	— (Note: "Aldrig vågat" did not enter the Swedish Singellista Chart, but peaked at number three on the Swedish Heatseeker Chart.)	Dreamer
"Röda himlar"	2020	— (Note: While "Röda Himlar" did not enter the Swedish Singellista Chart, it peaked at number two on the Swedish Heatseeker Chart.)	Non-album single
"Västerbron" (featuring Neiked)	2020	90	Non-album single
"Ser du månen där du är ikväll? (Tillsammans igen)"	2020	3	Non-album single
"Det är nog aldrig för sent för oss två"	2021	25	Spring Baby Spring
"Nätterna"	2021	67	Spring Baby Spring
"Hej hallå!"	2021	52	Spring Baby Spring
"Hotel Amigo" (featuring First Aid Kit)	2021	56	Spring Baby Spring
"Taxi taxi"	2021	— (Note: "Taxi taxi" did not enter the Swedish Singellista Chart, but peaked at number three on the Swedish Heatseeker Chart.)	Spring Baby Spring
"Silverblå"	2021	—	Spring Baby Spring
"Saknar du mig nu?"	2021	—	Spring Baby Spring
"Gator utan namn"	2021	—	Spring Baby Spring
"Göteborg"	2021	—	Spring Baby Spring
"Sweet Jackie"	2021	19	Så mycket bättre
"Drömmare"	2021	22	Så mycket bättre
"Du kommer sakna mig mindre och mindre"	2021	12	Så mycket bättre
"Moviestar"	2021	— (Note: "Moviestar" did not enter the Swedish Singellista Chart, but peaked at number 10 on the Swedish Heatseeker Chart.)	Så mycket bättre
"Till slutet av augusti"	2021	97	Så mycket bättre
"Gubben i lådan" (with Miriam Bryant)	2021	47	Så mycket bättre
"Gråter om du vill" (with Miriam Bryant)	2022	2	Non-album singles
"Väntar på en solig dag"	2022	71	Non-album singles
"Sista sommaren"	2022	9	Non-album singles
"Andas in andas ut"	2023	4	Superlativ 97
"Solen"	2023	18	Superlativ 97
"Bäst här inne"	2023	24	Superlativ 97
"Hoppas att jag gjorde allt jag kan"	2023	17	Superlativ 97
"Hålla tillbaks" (featuring Hurula)	2023	—	Superlativ 97
"Unnskyld, förlåt" (with Chris Holsten)	2024	81	Non-album single
"Minns du?" (with Jireel)	2024	32	Luanda
"Kaprifol"	2025	25	Sverige
"Helvete!"	2025	75	Sverige
"Carpe Diem"	2025	46	Sverige
"För Sverige i tiden"	2025	74	Sverige
"Vill du ha mig?"	2025	83	Non-album single
"Lång väg till toppen"	2025	67	Sverige
"Farsans händer"	2026	— (Note: "Farsans händer" did not enter the Swedish singles chart, but peaked at number 13 on the Swedish Heatseeker chart.)	Non-album single

=== Other charted songs ===
Title	Year	Peak positions	Album
Title	Year	SWE	Album
"Spring Baby Spring"	2021	40	Spring Baby Spring
"Stora blå" (with Stor and Ison & Fille)	2023	31	Över broarna
"Dina läppar"	2023	92	Superlativ 97
