= Eva Eastwood =

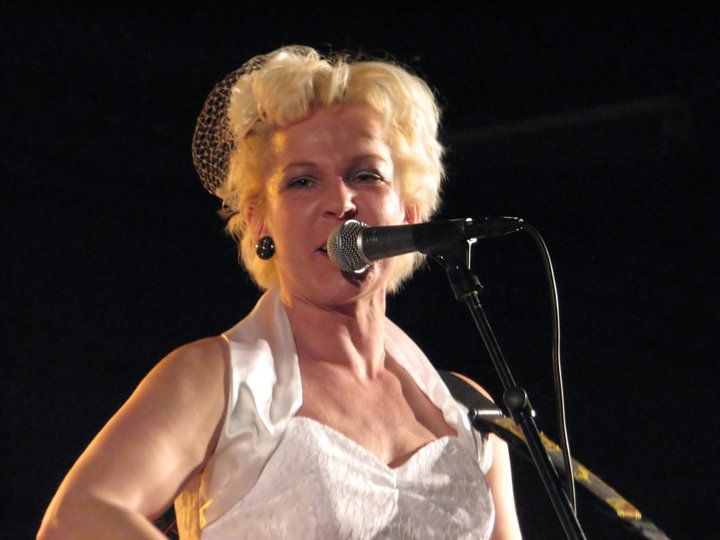

Background information
- Born: Eva Östlund; 25 September 1967 (age 59); Örebro, Sweden
- Genres: Rockabilly, Rock'n'Roll
- Occupations: Singer, songwriter
- Instrument: Vocals
- Years active: 1999–present
- Member of: Eva Eastwood and the Major Keys
- Website: evaeastwood.se

Eva Östlund, better known by her stage name Eva Eastwood (born 25 September 1967), is a Swedish songwriter and singer who sings rockabilly and rock 'n' roll songs.

Eastwood was born in Örebro. Although she was offered a contract in the United States in 1997, she chose to go back home and soon after formed the band The Major Keys and made releases crediting Eva Eastwood and the Major Keys through the small Tail Records label based in Jönköping

In 2005, she took part in Allsång på Skansen, a sing-along TV show from Skansen performing "Vårt liv i repris" from her album En ny stil i stan proving to be a turning point in her career. Eva won the Millencolin Music Prize 2010 becoming the first woman to do so. In 2011, she returned to the same stage singing the title track "Lyckost" from her similarly named album.

As a songwriter, she has composed over 800 songs, including the likes of The Boppers, Linda Gail Lewis, Lalla Hansson, Berth Idoffs, Jerry Williams and Larz-Kristerz.

== Discography ==
=== Albums ===
- 1999: Good Things Can Happen
- 2001: The Good Life I Have
- 2001: Hot Chicks & Cool Cats
- 2003: Roots Revival
- 2021: Candy

Year	Album title	Peak chart positions	Certifications
Year	Album title	SWE	Certifications
2005	En ny stil i stan (Eva Eastwood and The Major Keys)	53	
2006	Ton of Heart	29	
2008	Well Well Well	2	
2009	The Beat Goes On	6	
2009	Lyckost	2	
2012	Åh, vilken skiva! (Eva Eastwood and The Major Keys)	2	
2016	Min Melodi	11	
2017	Det bästa 2006–2016	25	

=== Singles ===
Year	Single	Peak chart positions	Certifications (sales thresholds)	Album
Year	Single	SWE	Certifications (sales thresholds)	Album
2008	"My My My"	22		Well Well Well
