= Christmas Time Has Come =

Studio album by Weeping Willows
- Released: 12 November 2014
- Genre: Christmas
- Label: Razzia

Weeping Willows chronology
The Time Has Come (2014)	Christmas Time Has Come (2014)

Christmas Time Has Come was released on 12 November 2014, and is a Weeping Willows Christmas album.

== Track listing ==
1. Someday at Christmas
2. What Can I Give You This Christmas
3. You're All I Want For Christmas
4. Pretty Paper
5. Merry Christmas Baby
6. First of May
7. O Holy Night
8. Midwinter Moon
9. Winter Night
10. Purple Snowflakes
11. Merry Christmas (I Don't Want To Fight Tonight)
12. Christmas Time Is Here Again
13. Have Yourself a Merry Little Christmas

== Charts ==
=== Weekly charts ===
Chart (2014)	Peak position
Swedish Albums (Sverigetopplistan)	3

=== Year-end charts ===
Chart (2014)	Position
Swedish Albums (Sverigetopplistan)	30

== Certifications ==
Region	Certification	Certified units/sales
Sweden (GLF)	Gold	20,000^{‡}
^{‡} Sales+streaming figures based on certification alone.
