= Sussie Eriksson =

Swedish singer and actress

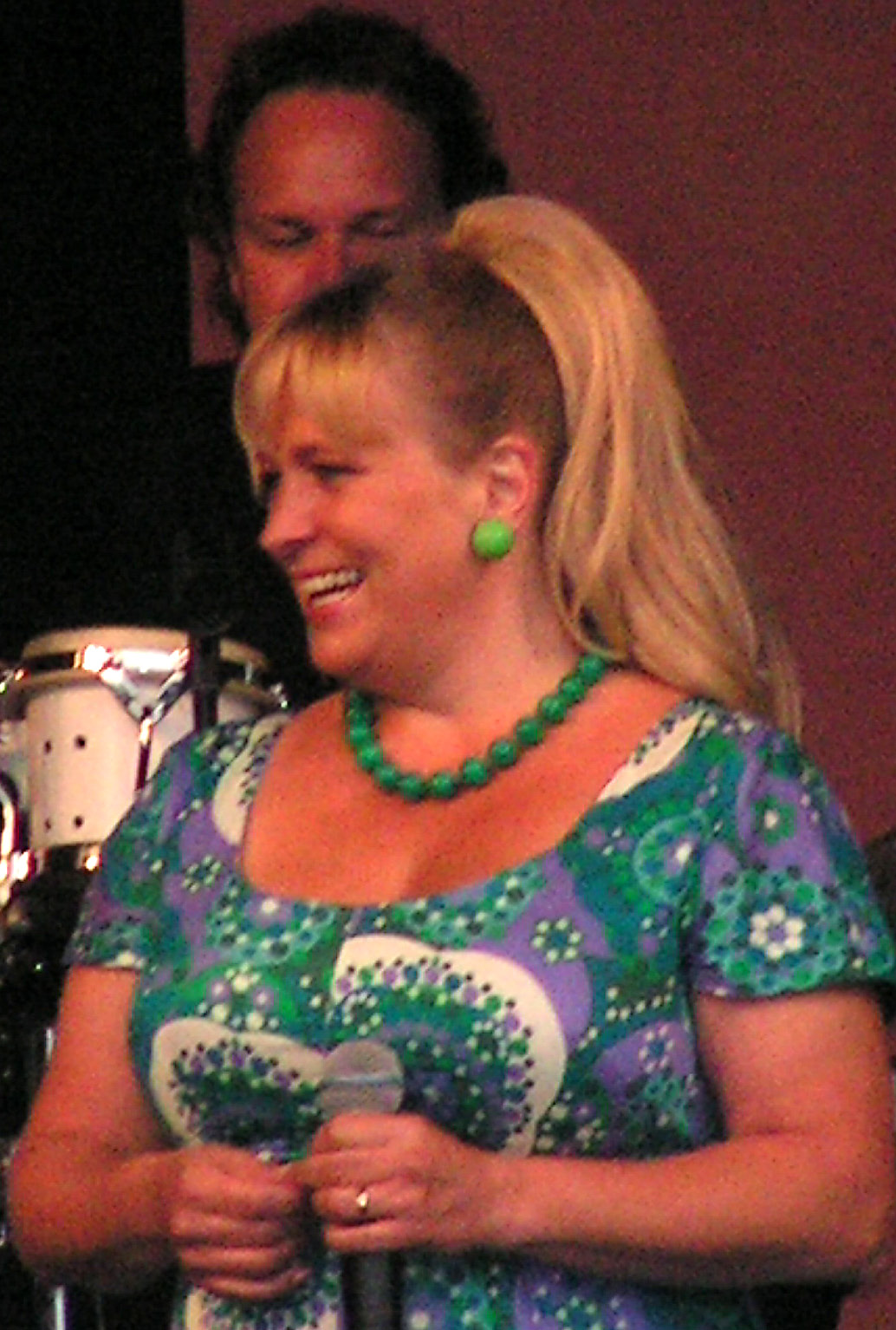
- Eriksson in 2007
- Born: Susanne Maria Eriksson; 2 January 1963 (age 63); Ekerö, Sweden
- Occupations: Singer, actress

Susanne Maria "Sussie" Eriksson (born 2 January 1963) is a Swedish singer and actress. Eriksson has worked in a number of musicals and had the lead role in the comedy series, c/o Segemyhr for five seasons, and also participated in the singing show Sing-A-Long.

== Career ==
Eriksson was born in Ekerö but now resides in Ludvika. She had her first role at a young age in the Ludvika Revue, where her father Lennart Eriksson worked as a producer. Eriksson also worked as a child actress in the television show Från A till Ö. As an adult, she worked in theater with Les Misérables, ABBA – The True Story, Cabaret and Little Shop of Horrors. Eriksson has also acted in variety shows with Bosse Parnevik at Oscarsteatern and has done bar shows along with Siw Malmkvist and Lasse Berghagen in the group Creme Fraiche. Eriksson has also participated in the TV3 show Sing-A-Long.

As a comedian, she was noticed for her role as a flight attendant in the revue Alla var där at Folkan in Stockholm. She also acted in the TV4 comedy series c/o Segemyhr as Cilla, in the role of long-suffering wife of unemployed former executive Fredrik Segemyhr. Eriksson starred in the films Lilla Jönssonligan och cornflakeskuppen, and Adam och Eva. She is also part of the dark comedy group R.E.A. She has also played the role of Karin in the ABBA musical Mamma Mia!, which was performed in both Gothenburg and Stockholm from 2005 to 2007. In 2009, Eriksson, along with Gunilla Backman and Charlott Strandberg, did the show PrimaDonnor at Hamburger Börs. Eriksson participated as a celebrity dancer in the fifteenth season of Let’s Dance and made it to the final.

== Filmography ==
- 1996 – Lilla Jönssonligan och cornflakeskuppen
- 1997 – Adam & Eva
- 1997 – Hercules (voice)
- 2003 – C/o Segemyhr (TV series)
- 2000 – Jönssonligan spelar högt
- 2008 – Bolt (voice)
- 2011 – Någon annanstans i Sverige
