= C/o Segemyhr =

- Genre: Sitcom
- Created by: Gustav Boman; Kjell Sundvall; Christjan Wegner; Paal Wesenlund
- Written by: Erik Haag; Fredrik Lindström; Ulf Kvensler; Lars Lundström; Gustav Boman
- Directed by: Kjell Sundvall
- Starring: Johan Ulveson; Sussie Eriksson; Lennart Jähkel; Olle Sarri
- Theme music composer: Lars In de Betou
- Country of origin: Sweden
- Original language: Swedish
- No. of seasons: 5
- No. of episodes: 58 (aired)

Production
- Executive producers: Anders Knave (Season 1-2); Moa Herngren (Season 3); Magnus Abrahamsson (Season 4-5)
- Producers: Per Blomquist (Season 1-3); Kerstin Johansson (Season 4-5)
- Production locations: Stockholm, Grevgatan 14; TV4 Studios
- Camera setup: multi-camera
- Running time: 23 minutes
- Production companies: TV Kompaniet (Season 1-2); Vicky Nöjesproduktion (Season 2-3); Jarowskij (Season 3-5)

Original release
- Network: TV4
- Release: 4 September 1998 – 13 December 2004

c/o Segemyhr (read care of Segemyhr) was a Swedish sitcom that premiered on TV4 Sweden on 4 September 1998. The series took place in and around an apartment in an exclusive neighbourhood in Stockholm, Artillerigatan 35 (in reality Grevgatan 14) and later Styrmansgatan 52 in the same area.

The series began with three seasons from fall 1998 to fall 1999, thereafter additionally two seasons were added in 2003–2004. All seasons have been released on DVD. Script writers were Fredrik Lindström and Erik Haag.

== Plot ==
The series centers around distinguished Fredrik Segemyhr, the owner of the apartment, portrayed by Johan Ulveson. The other three main characters are his girlfriend Cecilia Jansson, "Cilla", portrayed by Sussie Eriksson, Fredrik's friend and casual labourer Jan-Olof, portrayed by Lennart Jähkel and taxi driver Anton, portrayed by Olle Sarri.

Fredrik is an egocentric former top executive in the finance sector, who has happened to have lost his job. He refuses to admit to being unemployed, and states that he is "between jobs". He is feverishly trying to return to work life, and on his way back he tries to get both top positions but also somewhat unconventional jobs. Among other things he tries to become a sports commentator, art curator and Christmas magazine salesman, but fails everything he tries. Fredrik is Throughout the course of the show, with a few exceptions, Fredrik is in a relationship with Cilla, a relatively normal assistant nurse in her 30s. Because of Fredrik's lack of employment he can't pay his rent, and is forced to bring in two lodgers, Jan-Olof and Anton. Jan-Olof is a sex-obsessed casual laborer in his 50s without any big plans of settling down. Anton is a shy and insecure guy in his early twenties who drives a taxi but has dreams of becoming famous in one way or another. He only lives with Fredrik because he can't stand living with his mother, and can't afford a place of his own. In the first episode, Fredrik, Cilla and Jan-Olof are already living in the apartment, while Anton moves in after an offer from Jan-Olof in the middle of the first episode.

== Actors ==
=== Main characters ===
Actor	Character
Johan Ulveson	Fredrik Segemyhr
Sussie Eriksson	Cecilia Jansson
Lennart Jähkel	Jan-Olof Berger
Olle Sarri	Anton Lund

=== Guest actors ===
==== Recurring guests ====
Actor	Character
Anne-lie Rydé	Irene Lund
Ingela Olsson	Lillemor
Leif Andrée	The swimming-pool attendant
Therese Brunnander	Gertrud
