= Olivia Lobato =

Swedish pop singer (born 2004)

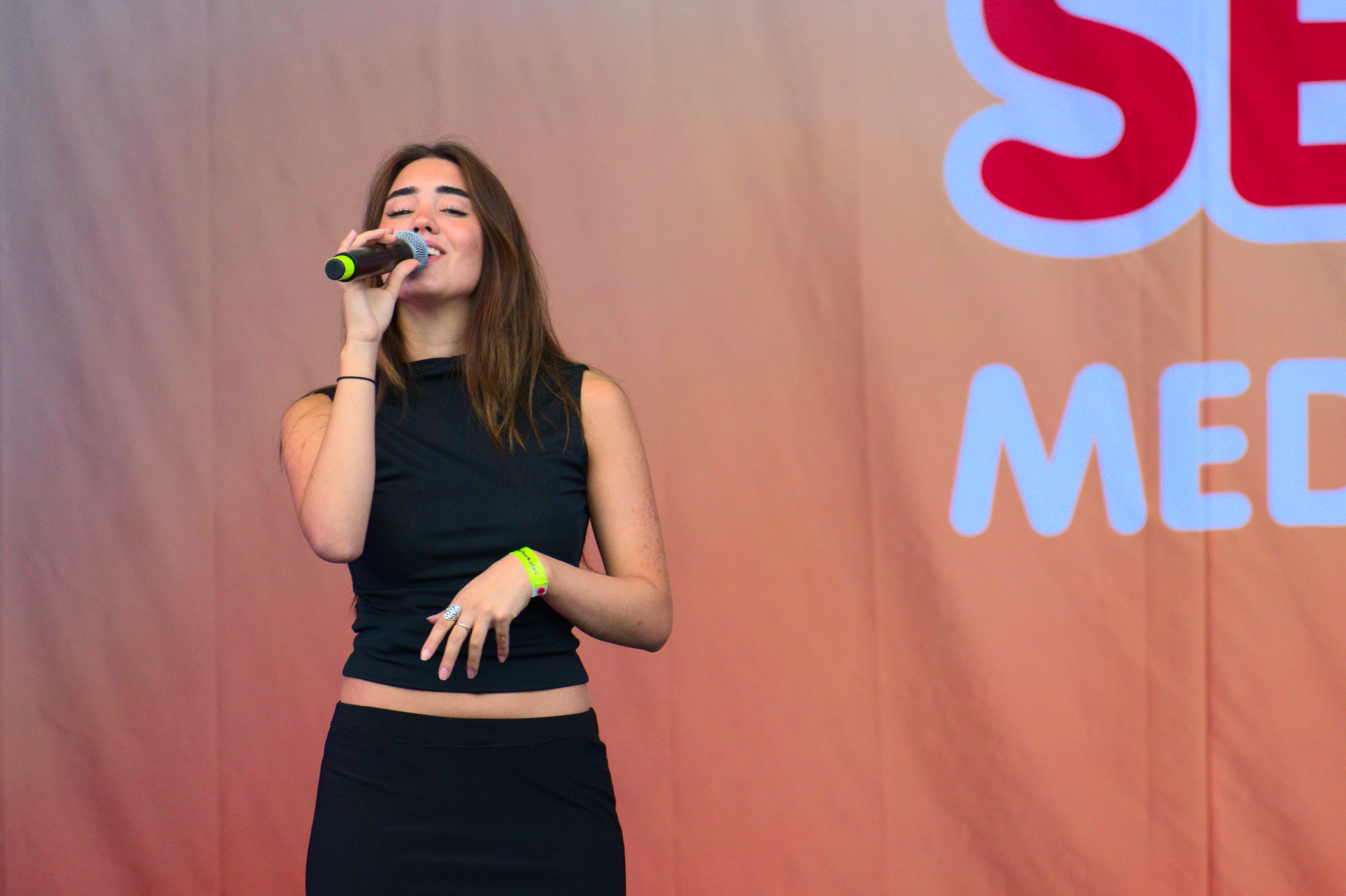
Olivia Lobato

Olivia Lobato Svensson (born 19 February 2004) is a Swedish singer. Her song "Syrener" reached third place at Sverigetopplistan in 2022. In 2023, Lobato participated in Allsång på Skansen.

== Singles ==
Title	Year	Peak chart positions		Album
Title	Year	SWE	NOR	Album
"Syrener"	2022	3	—	Non-album singles
"Ekko" (with Golfklubb)	2025	9	2	Non-album singles
