= Bosse Larsson =

Swedish television presenter

Bo Larsson
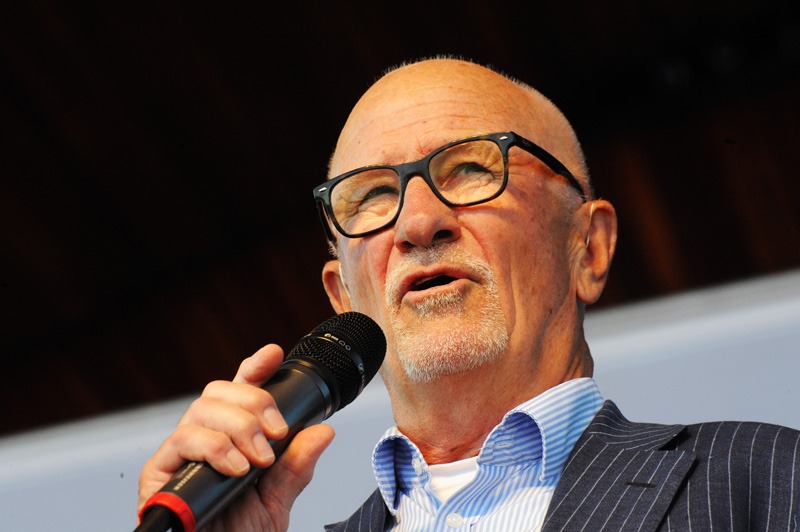
- Bosse Larsson in August 2013
- Born: 2 February 1934
- Died: 12 July 2015 (aged 81); Haninge, Sweden
- Occupation: television presenter
- Known for: Allsång på Skansen

Bo Einar "Bosse" Larsson (2 February 1934 – 12 July 2015) was a Swedish television presenter.

Larsson started working at Sparbanken in Drottninggatan, Stockholm and after that he worked as a janitor. In 1959, he worked as a United Nations soldier in Gaza. From 1960 to 1993 he worked at Sveriges Radio. Beginning in 1965 he hosted Gammeldans från Högloftet at Skansen. His best-known presenting job was on Nygammalt, which he presented between 1971–1989 and Allsång på Skansen 1974–93.

== Death ==
Larsson died from brain cancer on 12 July 2015, aged 81.

== Personal life ==
Larsson married Lisbeth Hansson in 1968.
