= Piga och dräng =

Single by Drängarna
- Language: Swedish
- Released: 2020
- Length: 3:00
- Songwriter(s): Thomas G:son; Anders Wigelius; Robert Norberg; Jimmy Jansson
- Producer(s): Jansson, Wigelius, Norberg

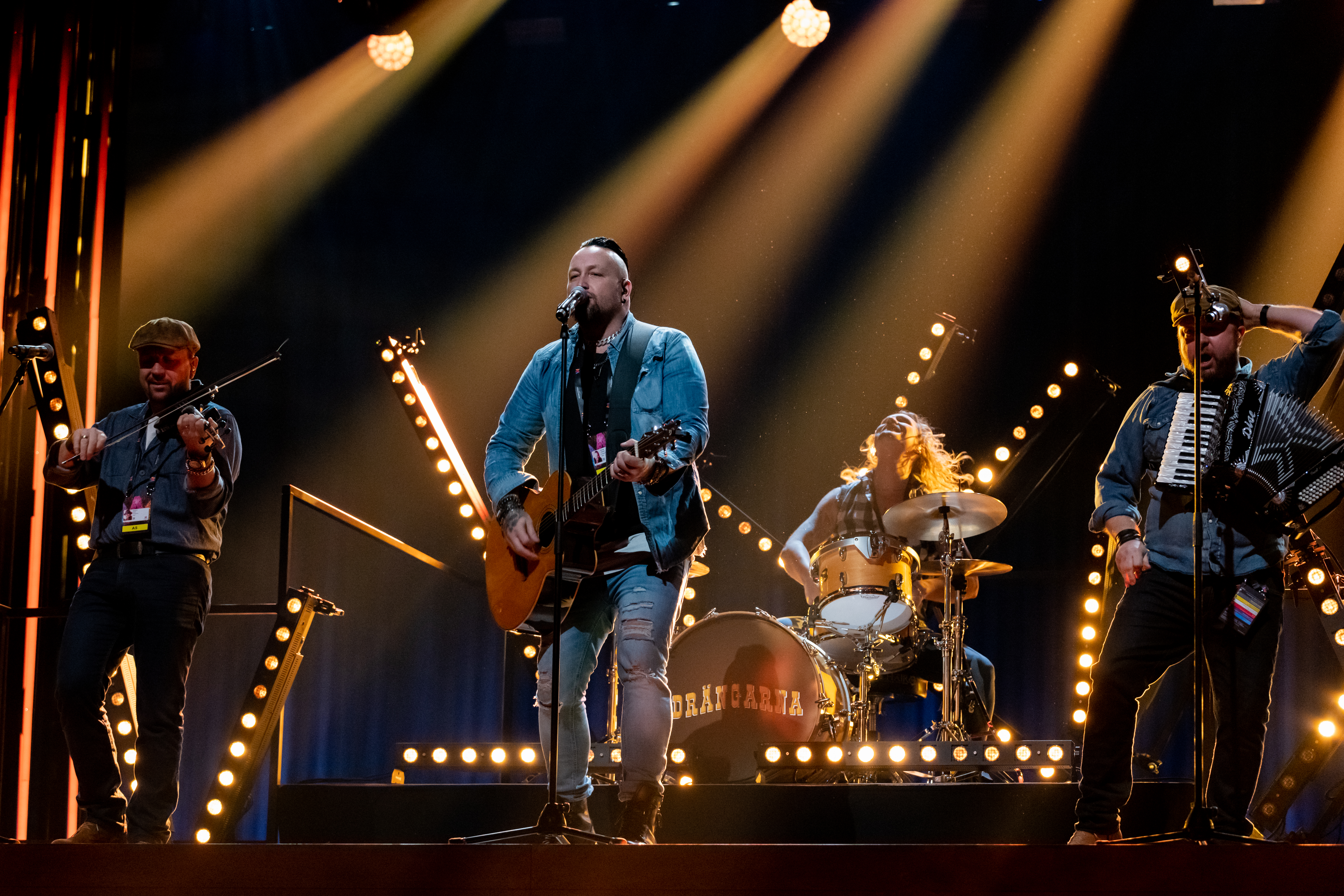
Drängarna at rehearsal for Melodifestivalen 2020, Eskilstuna

"Piga och dräng" is a Swedish language music single by Drängarna. The song competed in Melodifestivalen 2020 where it made it to the Second chance round.

== Charts ==
Chart (2020)	Peak position
Sweden (Sverigetopplistan)	11
