= Maja Francis =

Swedish pop singer

- Born: 10 November 1985 (age 40)
- Instruments: vocals
- Label: Sweden Music
- Website: https://www.majafrancis.com

Francis in 2026.

Maja Francis (Maja Francis Alderin) is a Swedish singer best known for her work with First Aid Kit and her closing track on the Netflix series Love & Anarchy.

== Biography ==
Francis grew up in Ängelholm, where her father owned a record store. She is the granddaughter of Scandinavian singer Thory Bernhards. Maja Francis attended Mega Musik Gymnasieskola in Helsingborg.

== Career ==
Francis debuted the single "Last Days of Dancing" in 2015. On August 14, 2015, she released the single "Space Invades My Mind" with Veronica Maggio. On the same day, Francis played on Way Out West's club spinoff Stay Out West, where Maggio visited to perform the single with Francis. In January 2016, her debut EP Come Companion was released. Then in 2017 she appeared with First Aid Kit guesting on their Who By Fire tribute concert to Leonard Cohen where she sang Famous Blue Raincoat and joined in with the So Long, Marianne finale.

She took a break after her pair of 2018 EPs, Cry Baby parts 1 and 2, saying later that "My relationship with music was kind of toxic after releasing my Cry Baby EPs in 2018… so I needed a break." She returned in December 2019, again with First Aid Kit, singing It Must Have Been Love as their tribute to Marie Fredriksson. She released her cover of Kate Bush's This Woman's Work in July 2020. In the same year, she recorded her single 'Anxious Angel' as the final track of the Netflix series Kärlek & Anarki (Love & Anarchy). The CD from First Aid Kit's Who By Fire tribute was released in 2021. Also in 2021, she appeared on a special edition of Jills veranda, and later in the year released her first album A Pink Soft Mess.

For New Year 2023, Francis performed Running Up That Hill on SVT's Årets quiz (This Year's Quiz). Later in the year she performed Heart of Gold with Jill Johnson on På spåret. Her 2024 collaborations include Anna Ternheim with the Swedish Radio Symphony Orchestra at Berwald Hall. In April 2024 she performed SOS at SVT's En fest för ABBA held at Cirkus (Stockholm). In 2025 she appeared on Allsång på Skansen with Thomas Stenström on August 6.

Francis has a record contract with Universal Music Group under its Sweden Music label and is listed in Sweden by RMV Grammafon.

== Discography ==
=== Albums ===
- A Pink Soft Mess (2021), recorded and produced by Johannes Runemark and David Wikber. Nominated for the 2022 by:Larm Nordic Music Prize
- Hello Cowboy (2024)

=== Live Album ===
- Live at Way Out West (October 13, 2023)

=== EP ===
- Come Companion (January 13, 2016)
- Cry Baby (Pt 1) (2018)
- Cry Baby (Pt 2) (2018)

=== Singles ===
Singles
Title	Released	Album	Credits	Label	Notes
"Just the Way You Are"	September 16, 2015		Writer: Billy Joel; Artist: Maja Francis	Sweden Music	
"Last Days of Dancing" (Acoustic Version)	April 24, 2015		Writers: David Axelsson, Maja Francis, Petter Winnberg, Veronica Maggio; Primary artist: Maja Francis	Universal Music AB	Kretsen Remix released 2015
"Space Invades My Mind" (Acoustic Version)	17 August 2015		Written and produced by Maja Francis, Veronica Maggio and Petter Winnberg - and additionally produced by David Axelsson; Artists: Maja Francis, Veronica Maggio	Universal Music Publishing	
"Anxious Angel"	2020	Later included on Live at Way Out West	Written by David Wikberg, Johannes Runemark, Maja Ulrika Alderin Francis	RMV Grammofon AB, Distributed by Universal Music AB	Used as the final track of the Netflix series Love & Anarchy.
"Tiny Tornados"	2021	Later included on A Pink Soft Mess	Written by Maja Francis, Johannes Runemark & David Wikberg	Universal Music Publishing	
"PMS Party"	May 21 2021	A Pink Soft Mess	Written and produced by David Wikberg, Johannes Runemark, Maja Francis	RMV Grammofon	
"Clown Girl"	December 2024	Hello Cowboy	Written by Johannes Runemark, Maja Francis; Performed with Johannes Runemark, Gabriel Runemark, David Wikberg, Theo Stocks	RMV Grammofon AB	
"Swedish Mermaid"	September 2026		Co-written by Maja Francis and Johannes Runemark	Playground Music Scandinavia	

=== Charted singles ===
List of singles, with selected chart positions
Title	Year	Peak chart positions
Title	Year	SWE
"Douchebag"	2022	— (Note: "Douchebag" did not enter the Swedish Singellista Chart, but peaked at number one on the Swedish Heatseeker Chart.)
"Please Remember Me"	2022	65
"Girl Laying Down"	2022	74
"Beg Me (Be mig)"	2022	— (Note: "Beg Me (Be mig)" did not enter the Swedish Singellista Chart, but peaked at number four on the Swedish Heatseeker Chart.)

=== With First Aid Kit ===
- 2019 cover of Roxette's It Must Have Been Love as their tribute to Marie Fredriksson
- 2021 release of 2017 Leonard Cohen tribute concert Who By Fire where she sang Famous Blue Raincoat
