= JEERK =

Rhythm performance group from Sweden

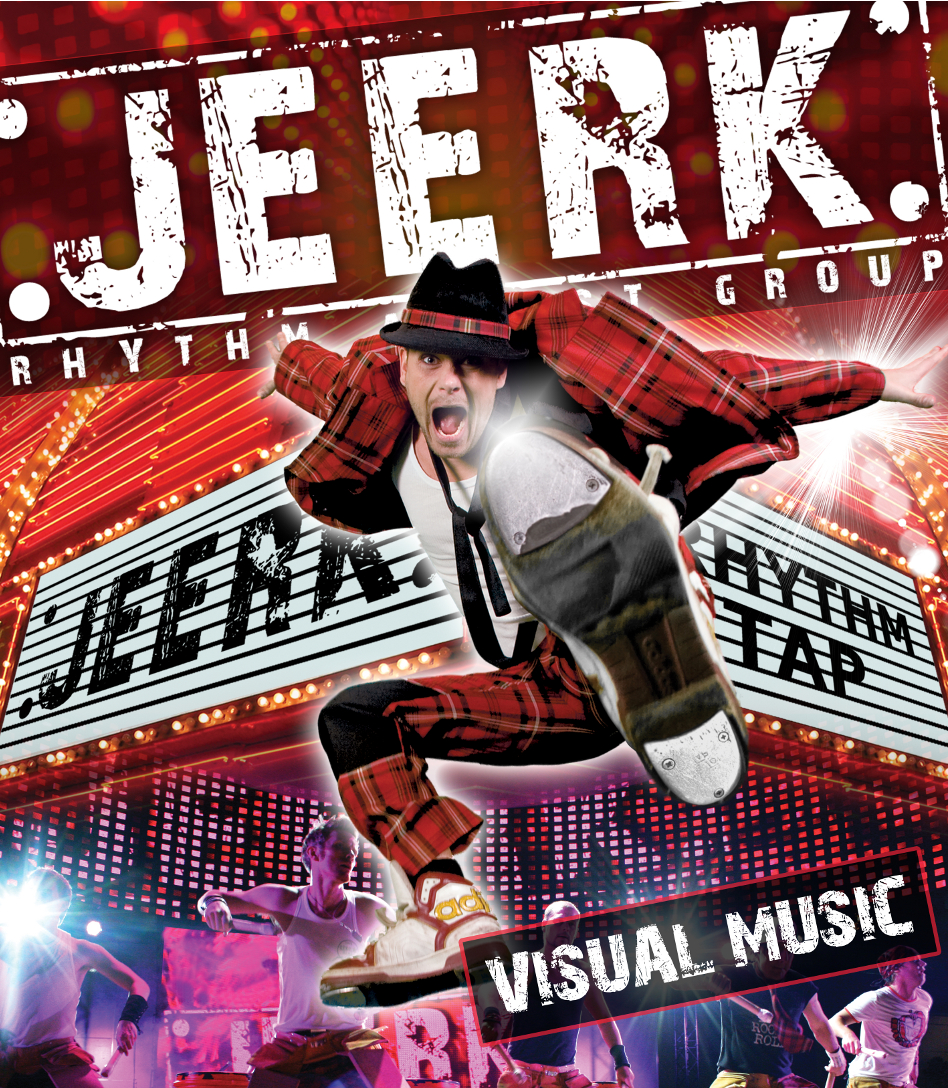
- JEERK

Background information
- Origin: Sweden
- Genres: Dance, Rhythm Artists, Rock Music
- Years active: 2002–present
- Members: Niklas Karlsson; Thomas Bergstig; Johan Regnell; Bo-Erik Eriksson; Johan Eriksson; Kristian Lindin; Mikael Johansson
- Past members: Michael Jansson; Fredrik Lexfors
- Website: http://www.jeerk.com

JEERK is a rhythm performance group from Sweden, which was formed in 2002. The founding members were Niklas Karlsson, Johan Regnell, Bo-Erik Eriksson, Michael Jansson and Johan Eriksson. The group's name was formed by using the first initial from the founding member's surname; i.e., Jansson, Eriksson, Eriksson, Regnell, Karlsson. After two months, Thomas Bergstig joined JEERK. Each member has attended either the Ballet Academy or the Performing Arts School in Gothenburg.

JEERK writes and produces all of their material, e.g.: music, choreography, scripts, videos and graphics. JEERK is administered through two corporations: Greenhouse Production AB (Sweden) and DDFS Entertainment, Inc (USA).

JEERK specializes in visual music. They perform varied styles of dance, primarily tap dancing. The group features rhythms made by converting ordinary items (i.e., lunch boxes, hockey sticks, trash cans) into percussion instruments. The members of JEERK are all multi-instrumentalists and incorporate original songs within their performances.

== Members ==
- Niklas "Nikke" Karlsson (2002–present) -- Originally from Kungälv
- Johan "Reggie" Regnell (2002–present) -- Originally from Linköping
- Bo-Erik "BoBo" Eriksson (2002–present) -- Originally from Norrtälje
- Michael Jansson (2002–2005) -- Originally from Trollhättan
- Johan "Xet" Eriksson (2002–present) -- Originally from Örebro
- Thomas "Tymac" Bergstig (2002–present) -- Originally from Stockholm
- Fredrik Lexfors (2005–2006) -- Originally from Vinslöv
- Kristian Lindin (2012–present) --Originally from Örebro
- Mikael Johansson (2012–present) --Originally from Skattungbyn

== Performance history ==
JEERK's first show was at Pusterviksteatern, Gothenburg, in 2002 with the group's first showcase in Skene, the same year. JEERK has performed in many venues, including: stage shows, as guest entertainers on television programs, at special events, festivals, as well as several product launches. JEERK has choreographed several numbers for guest performers at Sweden's Onstage Event, and to promote new products for companies. Lindab is one of JEERK’s most devout partners and provided the group with ventilation pipes for drums. Whenever Lindab quests to conquer a new market, JEERK helps out with their special talent for loud sound. JEERK has also composed rhythmic pieces of music for German CLAAS and Swedish SKF. The song Emergency was originally written for a commercial for the diaper brand Huggies.

The JEERK Show tour with the National Swedish Touring Theatre, was JEERK's first full-length show which toured almost 40 cities around Sweden. JEERKs second full-length show, Overload sold out for four nights in a row during December 2004.

JEERK’s TV-breakthrough was Sweden’s most popular TV-show, ”Allsång på Skansen”, in 2003, with millions of viewers every summer. In 2004, they appeared as special guests on Lill-Babs i 50 år, a television show celebrating the career of the Swedish singer and actress Lill-Babs.

In 2006, JEERK performed in the opening ceremony of the European Athletics Championship in Göteborg, an event which had "a total audience of 340 million over the seven days of the championships." Irish singer Ronan Keating, famous for his rendition of When You Say Nothing at All, also performed during the Ceremony.

In the same year, JEERK appeared as guest performers at the Swedish Eurovision Song Contest, with approximately 3,645,000 viewers.

In 2007, the group performed on Let's Dance, Sweden's version of Dancing with the Stars, which had a viewership of over two million people.

In 2008, the group performed on the Romanian show Dansez pentru tine which means “Dancing for you” in an episode where the contestants as well as the guest artists performed for a cause. JEERK, in this particular case, performed for a girl who was not able to pay for her dance school.

In 2009, the group had their first US performance at the theme park Silver Dollar City, performing several shorter shows per day. After a successful 10-week run at the theme park, JEERK returned to the US in 2010 to perform for two years at the Hughes Brother's Theatre in Branson, MO. Following the second year's performances, JEERK began to pursue a European and US tour.

== Album release ==
In May, 2012, JEERK released their first full-length album, FAMOUS. FAMOUS consists of nine tracks, composed and written by members of the group.

== Showography ==
=== Show ===
- 2004 The JEERK Show tour with the National Swedish Touring Theatre
- 2004 Overload Grand stage, Gothenburg Opera
- 2006 Rock´n´Rhythm Show Trädgår´n, Gothenburg
- 2006 JEERK Christmas Show Rörstrands Industries, Linköping
- 2007 JEERKmania Sweden tour
- 2007 The Best of JEERK Storan, Gothenburg and Nalen, Stockholm
- 2009 Theme Park Special Silver Dollar City, Branson, Missouri
- 2010 The JEERK Show 2010 Hughes Brothers Theatre, Branson, Missouri
  - JEERK won “Best Show Award”.
- 2011 The JEERK Show 2011 Hughes Brothers Theatre, Branson, Missouri
- 2012 The JEERK Show 2012 Andy Williams Moon River Theatre, Branson, Missouri
- 2012 The JEERK Show Dominican Republic tour
- 2013 The JEERK Show 2013 RFD-TV The Theatre, Branson, Missouri
- 2013 The JEERK Show Wisconsin State Fair, West Allis, Wisconsin

=== TV ===
- 2003 Allsång på Skansen, SVT2
- 2004 Bingolotto, Performers, TV4
- 2006 European Athletics Championships opening ceremony, Eurosport
- 2006 Eurovision Song Contest, Guest performers, Scandinavium, SVT1
- 2007 Let’s Dance, Guest performers, TV4
- 2007 Bingolotto, Performers, TV4
- 2008 Dansez Pentru Tine, Guest performers, ProTV, Romania

=== Event ===
- 2002 Opening ceremony of Casino Cosmopol, Gothenburg
- 2004 Carnegie Art Award, Honoring Nina Roos
- 2006 Opening ceremony of Kanyon Shopping Center, Istanbul
- 2007 SKF 100th anniversary, feat. Neil Armstrong, Gothenburg
- 2007 Lindab, product launch, Frankfurt
- 2008 Lindab, product launch, Basel
- 2008 Lindab, product launch, Milan
- 2007 CLAAS, product launch Sweden, Mantorp
- 2008 Opening ceremony of Bâneasa Shopping Center, Bucharest
- 2011 Bilsport Awards, Stockholm
- 2012 Volvo Product Launch, Gothenburg, Stockholm
- 2012 Pacific Life Conference, Huntington Beach
- 2013 Guldkärnan, Helsingborg
- 2014 Still/Moving UCMO, Warrensburg

=== Other ===
- 2005 Onstage, Svenska Mässan, Gothenburg and Älvsjömässan, Stockholm
- 2008 Danish-German Children's Theatre Festival, Flensburg & Haderslev
- 2008 Onstage, Scandinavium, Gothenburg and The Globe, Stockholm
