= Blenda Nkímyá =

- Born: Blenda Shimba Kabondo; January 15, 1993 (age 33); Vällingby, Sweden
- Genres: Gospel, RnB, Pop
- Label: Def Jam Recordings

Blenda Nkímyá, also known simply as Blenda (born 15 January 1993 in Vällingby), is a Swedish singer.

== Biography ==
Blenda Shimba Kabondo grew up in Vällingby and sang in the Philadelphia Church throughout her childhood.

In April 2017, she released her debut single, Chili, followed by the single Mama Mojo's Club (dick pic song) in June of the same year. In October 2017, she performed at the MeToo demonstration at Sergels torg. In January 2018, she released the single Payday, which she performed on TV4's Nyhetsmorgon on 28 January. In January 2019, the single Funeral was released.

In March 2020, she released the single Options with Def Jam Recordings; the American record label that is part of Universal Music Group and represents artists like Jay-Z, Rihanna, Kanye West, and Justin Bieber. On 24 March, she performed the song on TV4's Nyhetsmorgon. On 21 July, she appeared on Allsång på Skansen and performed "Options" as well as the sing-along song "Ida's Summer Song". In the subsequent More Allsång, she performed "Funeral".

== Personal life ==
She and her husband Joel took the surname Nkímyá when they married. Kimya means "peace" in Lingala, the language spoken in Congo where her parents are from. The accents in the name were added by the couple for aesthetic reasons.

== Discography ==
=== Singles ===
Year	Title	Label
2017	Chili	
2017	Mama Mojo's Club (dick pic song)	
2018	Payday	
2019	Funeral	SION Agency
2020	Options	Def Jam Recordings

=== Featured on ===
Year	Title
2018	Sugar; Urban Cone featuring Blenda
