= Den svenska björnstammen =

Swedish band

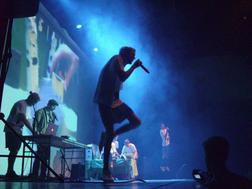

Background information
- Origin: Norrköping, Sweden
- Genres: Pop; dream pop; electronica; indie rock
- Years active: 2010–present
- Labels: Pope Records and Universal Music Sweden
- Members: Dan Brännvall; Petter Frisendahl; Ambjörn Göransson; Mattias Göransson; Klas Isaksson; Åke Olofsson
- Past members: Kim Dahlberg (2008–2018)
- Website: densvenskabjornstammen.se

Den svenska björnstammen (Swedish for "The Swedish Bear Population") is a Swedish musical pop band from Norrköping, formed in 2010 and consisting of Dan Brännvall, Kim Dahlberg, Petter Frisendahl, Ambjörn Göransson, Mattias Göransson, Klas Isaksson and Åke Olofsson. The band was originally signed to Pope Records who has a special distribution agreement with Universal Music Sweden since 2009.

== History ==
The band was one of three finalists for the Metro on Stage music competition. In 2011, it had a breakthrough with the song "Vart jag mig i världen vänder" ("Wherever I Turn in the World"), topping the Swedish national record chart Sverigetopplistan for six weeks. The band's follow-up song, "Svalkar vinden" ("Does The Wind Cool") and "Trumma Trumma" ("Drum Drum") also charted.

== Discography ==
=== Studio albums ===
| Album | Year | Peak positions |
| Album | Year | SWE |
|---|---|---|
| Ett fel närmare rätt | 2012 | 12 |
| I förhållande till | 2014 | 22 |
| Country | 2014 | 9 |
| Iskanten | 2019 | 30 |
| Djur och människa | 2022 | |
| Med sång / Utan sång | 2024 | |
| Kontrollen & förlusten av den | 2026 | |

=== Extended plays ===
- 2008: Classics
- 2010: Dansmusik EP (Dance Music EP)

=== Singles ===
| Title | Year | Peak positions | Album |
| Title | Year | SWE | Album |
|---|---|---|---|
| "Vart jag mig i världen vänder" | 2011 | 1 | Ett fel närmare rätt |
| "Svalkar vinden" | 2011 | 34 | Ett fel närmare rätt |
| "Trumma trumma" | 2012 | 58 | Ett fel närmare rätt |
| "I förhållande till" | 2012 | — | I förhållande till |
| "Hatar allt" | 2014 | — | I förhållande till |
| "Förlåta eller svika" | 2015 | — (Note: "Förlåta eller svika" did not enter the Swedish Singles Chart, but peaked at number 11 on the Swedish Heatseeker chart.) | Country |
| "Country" (with Maj Monet) | 2015 | — (Note: "Country" did not enter the Swedish Singles Chart, but peaked at number two on the Swedish Heatseeker chart.) | Country |
| "Lämnar" | 2017 | — | Iskanten |
| "Förlorare utan chans" (with Thomas Stenström) | 2017 | — (Note: "Förlorare utan chans" did not enter the Swedish Singles Chart, but peaked at number six on the Swedish Heatseeker chart.) | Non-album single |
| "Bara skog" | 2018 | — | Iskanten |
| "Den goda viljan" | 2018 | — | Iskanten |
| "Stora plank & små staket" | 2018 | — | Iskanten |
| "När jag blundar vill jag vara nån annan" | 2019 | — | Iskanten |
| "Upp" | 2020 | — | Djur och människa |
| "Vatten och bröd" | 2020 | — | Djur och människa |
| "Att vara själv och inte ensam alls" | 2021 | — | Djur och människa |
| "Drömmer om andedag" | 2021 | — | Djur och människa |
| "Innan dom stelnar" | 2022 | — | Djur och människa |

== See also ==
- List of dance-pop artists
- List of Swedes in music
- List of Universal Music Group artists
- Music of Sweden
