= Weeping Willows (band) =

Swedish indie rock band

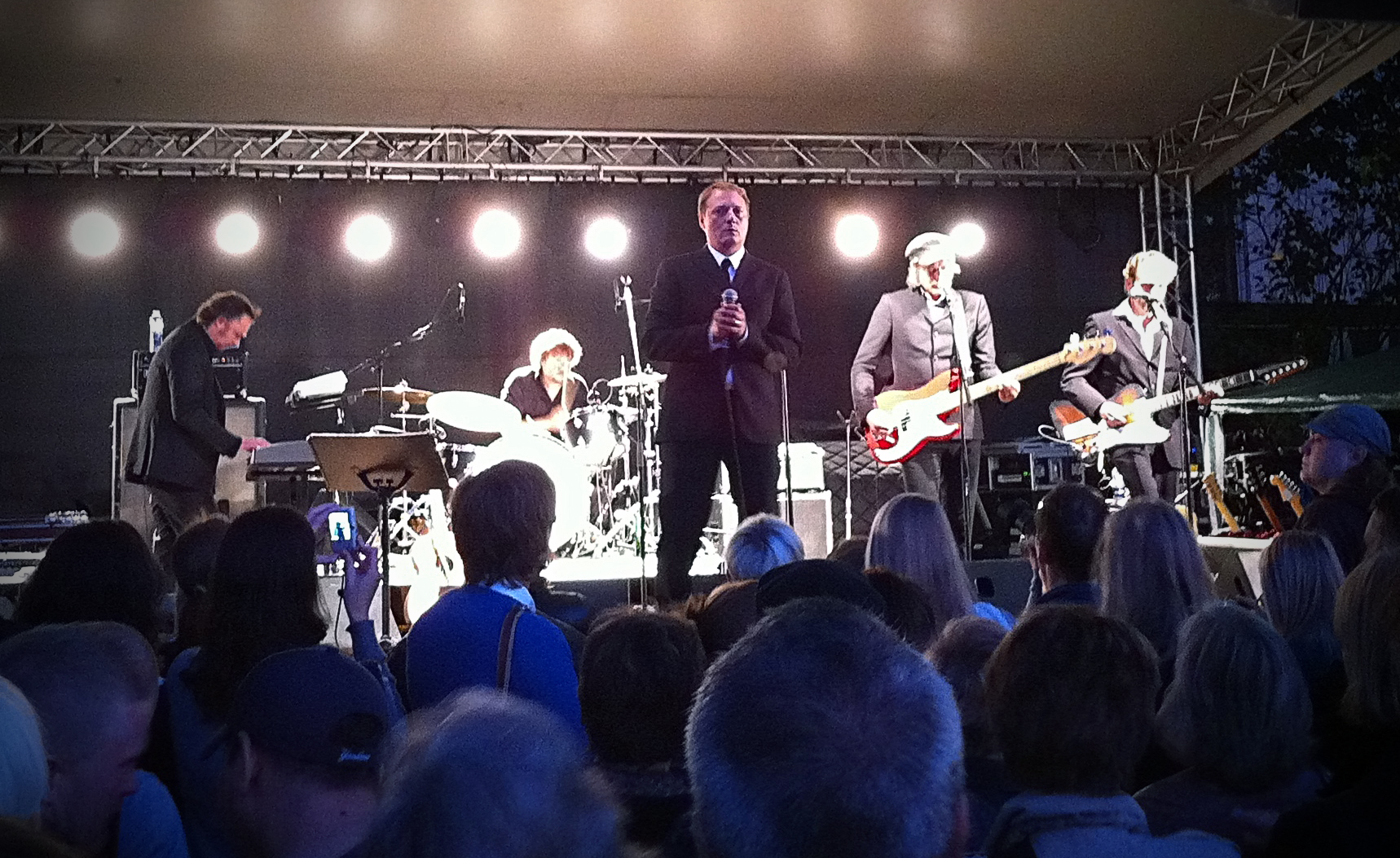
- Weeping Willows on stage in Stockholm, 2011

Background information
- Origin: Sweden
- Genres: Indie rock; indie pop; alternative country
- Years active: 1995–present
- Labels: Virgin; EMI; Grand Recordings
- Members: Magnus Carlson; Ola Nyström; Anders Hernestam; Niko Röhlcke
- Past members: Mats Hedén; Stefan Axelsen
- Website: blixten.se/weeping-willows weepingwillows.nu

Weeping Willows is a Swedish indie rock group that started in 1995.

== History ==
The band's first two albums are primarily influenced by the popular music of the late 1950s to early 1960s. With their third album Into the Light, Weeping Willows took a stylistic turn towards a more modern sound with alternative rock leanings.

Singer Magnus Carlson has also made albums as a solo artist and sang with fellow Swedish band West End Girls on a cover of the Pet Shop Boys' single "What Have I Done to Deserve This?" in 2008.

The lyrics typically deal with unhappy love, loneliness and heart-ache.

In the end of August 2006 Weeping Willows were the 99th most successful band in Sweden since 1985 (just after Elton John) at the list Tracks (statistics maintained by the Swedish Radio).

In 2005 they were in 80th place on the most played bands on Swedish radio (with a top position of 5 in 2002). Most played songs are "Touch Me" (7th most played song in 2002 in Swedish Radio) and "Stairs" (8th most played song 2004 in Swedish Radio).

The band has collaborated with Oasis member Andy Bell on several occasions. Weeping Willows guitarist/keyboardist Niko Röhlcke has also collaborated with English guitarist and singer/songwriter Marty Willson-Piper on a project called MOAT. They are currently working on their second release.

== Members ==
=== Current members ===
- Magnus Carlson – vocals
- Ola Nyström – guitar, background vocals
- Anders Hernestam – drums
- Niko Röhlcke – guitar, slideguitar, keyboards

=== Live member ===
- Anders Kappelin – bass guitar

=== Past members ===
- Stefan Axelsen – bass guitar
- Mats Hedén – keyboards
- Thomas Sundgren – percussion

== Discography ==
=== Albums ===
Year	Album	Peak positions	
Year	Album	SWE	FIN
1997	Broken Promise Land	13	–
1999	Endless Night	2	–
2002	Into the Light	1	–
2004	Presence	2	30
2005	Singles Again	6	–
2007	Fear & Love	2	–
2014	The Time Has Come	2	24
2014	Christmas Time Has Come	4	–
2016	Tomorrow Became Today	1	41
2017	Snowflakes	19	–
2019	After Us	1	–
2021	Songs of Winter	6	–
2022	In Concert	36	–
2022	The Dreams We Weave	9	–
2025	Goodwill	8	–

=== Singles ===
- "Broken Promise Land" (1997) SWE #23 NED: 92
- "Eternal Flames" (1997)
- "Blue and Alone" (1997)
- "December Songs" (1997)
- "You're everywhere" (1999) (with The Boppers, from the motion picture Under the Sun)
- "True to You" (1999)
- "By the River" / "I Close My Eyes" (1999)
- "When You Are Asleep" (1999) (with Titiyo)
- "While I'm Still Strong" (1999)
- "Touch Me" (2001) SWE #21
- "Falling" (2002)
- "Stairs" (2004) SWE #22
- "You Weren't Even Close" (2004)
- "Lost Love" (2004)
- "I'm Gonna Let Love Find Me" (2005) SWE #44
- "The Burden" (2007) SWE #49
- "Shiver in the Morning Light" (2007)
- "(We're In) Different Places" (2014)
- "It Takes a Strong Heart to Love" (2014)
- "Someday at Christmas" (2019)
- "Merry Christmas Baby" (2014)
- "My Love Is Not Blind" (2016)
- "Wait for Love to Grow" (2016)
- "Let Christmas Be the Reason" (2017)
- "A Snowflake Fell (And It Felt Like a Kiss" (2018) (with Ane Brun)
- "Butterfly" (2019)
- "Merry Christmas, My Love" (2020) SWE #45
- "The Magic Is Real" (2021) (with Lisa Nilsson)
- "The Light" (2022)
- "Summer Waits for Me" (2022)
- "Shine Your Light On Me" (2022)

=== DVDs ===
- Live in Helsinki (2005)
