= Egon Kjerrman =

Ernst Egon Napoleon Kjerrman (25 September 1920 – 13 March 2007) was a Swedish kapellmeister, actor and composer. He was famous for hosting Allsång på Skansen from 1956 to 1966. He was pianist in Sveriges magasin and participated in many other radio and TV programs during the 1960s, 1970s and 1980s.

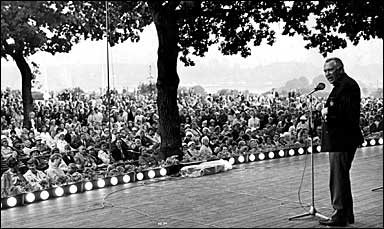
Ernst Egon Napoleon Kjerrman was addressing people under the tree

== Biography ==
Born in Gothenburg, Kjerrman started his music career as conductor and répétiteur at Stora Teatern in Gothenburg. During the 1940s he moved to Chicago where he worked as a police officer and wrote music. In 1952 he moved back to Sweden to work as conductor at Sveriges Radio. He also worked as conductor at the Royal Swedish Academy of Music. Kjerrman was awarded the Illis quorum in 1993.
