= Byz =

Swedish hip-hop musician from Sala

- Born: Jorma Andreas Byström; 27 May 1984 (age 42)
- Origin: Sala, Sweden
- Genre: Hip hop
- Occupations: Rapper; singer; songwriter
- Years active: 1999–present

Jorma Andreas Byström (born 27 May 1984), known under his stage name Byz, is a Swedish rapper from Sala. His artist-name is inspired by his last name. Over the years from 1999 to 2000, he started his career as a musician with the group Inte helt oskyldiga. But not until 2003 did he release his first solo album, There Is Still a Party Going On. In 2004, Byz had planned to end his music career, but ultimately decided against it. He released his second solo album, From Here to Somewhere, during the summer of that year. The album was sold in limited edition, just like his first 100 records, mainly for friends and family. In recent years, with the help of the Internet, his music has spread rapidly.

In 2005 Byz released his first Swedish album, which came to be called Når botten i toppen av en sjuttis. The single "Karatefylla" on the last album Fett av dig. He quickly became popular among many young people.

In 2008 Byz initiated closer cooperation with his former companion, Headline. This collaboration was to result in the joint album Does It Look Like I Care? released in the second quarter of 2009 via their website. Unlike the previous albums, it was made available for free.

== Personal life ==
Byz's father is Finnish. In December 2010, Byström's wife, Juumi Aleksis Byström, gave birth to the couple's second child in Hanover, Germany.

== Discography ==
=== Albums ===
- Vadå (with Inte helt oskyldiga), 2001
- There Is Still a Party Going On, 2003
- From Here to Somewhere, 2004
- Når botten i toppen av en sjuttis, 2005
- Fett av dig, 2007
- Ser det ut som jag bryr mig, 2009

=== Singles ===
- 2004 – "The party is in you"
- 2006 – "Karatefylla"
- 2007 – "Hey där"
- 2011 – "Ölbrillor" (Erik og Kriss feat. Byz)
- 2012 – "Tjena tjena tjena" ( feat. Kriss & Robin Bengtsson)
- 2012 – "Min dealer" (feat. Sibel)
- 2012 – "Pusha den hårt" (feat. KADE)
- 2015 – "Tusen smällar sen " (feat. Sara Varga)
