= Drängarna =

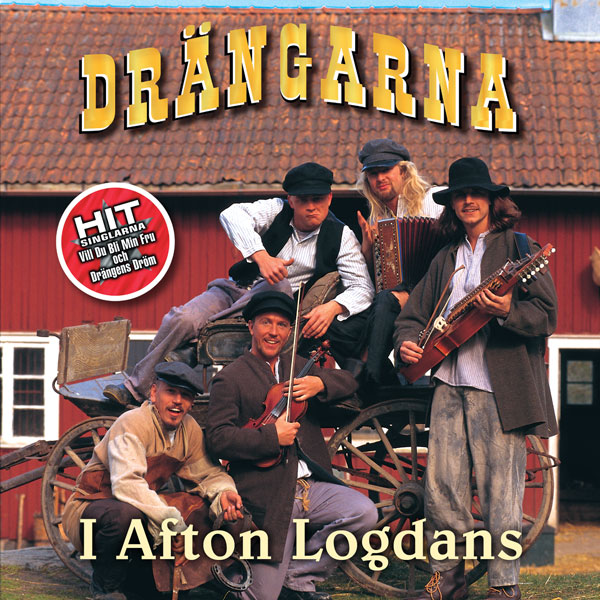
- Drängarna album cover

Background information
- Origin: Sweden
- Genres: Rock, Pop, Dansband
- Years active: 1995
- Website: drangarna.se

Drängarna (The Farmhands) is a Swedish rock-pop/dansband that was formed in 1995, with group members are Peter i Österöd (Peter Simson), Sunna Robert, Lasse i Torp (Lars McLachlan) and Olav i Fossen (Olav Fossheim). Drängarna now consists of Johan i Backen (Johan Sahlén) on vocals, Sunna Robert (Robert Åhlin) on violin and vocals, and Olav i Fossen on the accordion.

"Vill du bli min fru" was their most well-known song in 1995. It was a number one chart single on the Billboard Sweden (GLF) Chart and charted on the Music & Media Eurochart Hot 100 Singles. The single sold around 35,000 copies and the album sold around 100,000 copies. Other hit songs include "Kung över ängarna" and "Snickerboa".

In September 2006, they released their album Himlen kan vänta, with hit songs "Raggaren", "Såpornas kung", and "Ei saa peittää".

They participated in Melodifestivalen 2020 with the song "Piga och dräng".

== Legal issues ==
Drängarna's greatest hit song, "Vill du bli min fru", was subject to some controversy in 2002, when it was decided by the Supreme Court of Sweden that an eight-bar violin part was plagiarized from a song by the group Landslaget. This was the first copyright infringement case tried in Sweden. As a result, Drängarna's label Regatta was forced to pay damages and courtroom costs.

== Discography ==
=== Singles ===
Title	Year	Peak chart positions	Album
Title	Year	SWE	Album
"Piga och dräng"	2020	11	Non-album single
