= Kjell Lönnå =

Swedish choir leader (1936–2022)

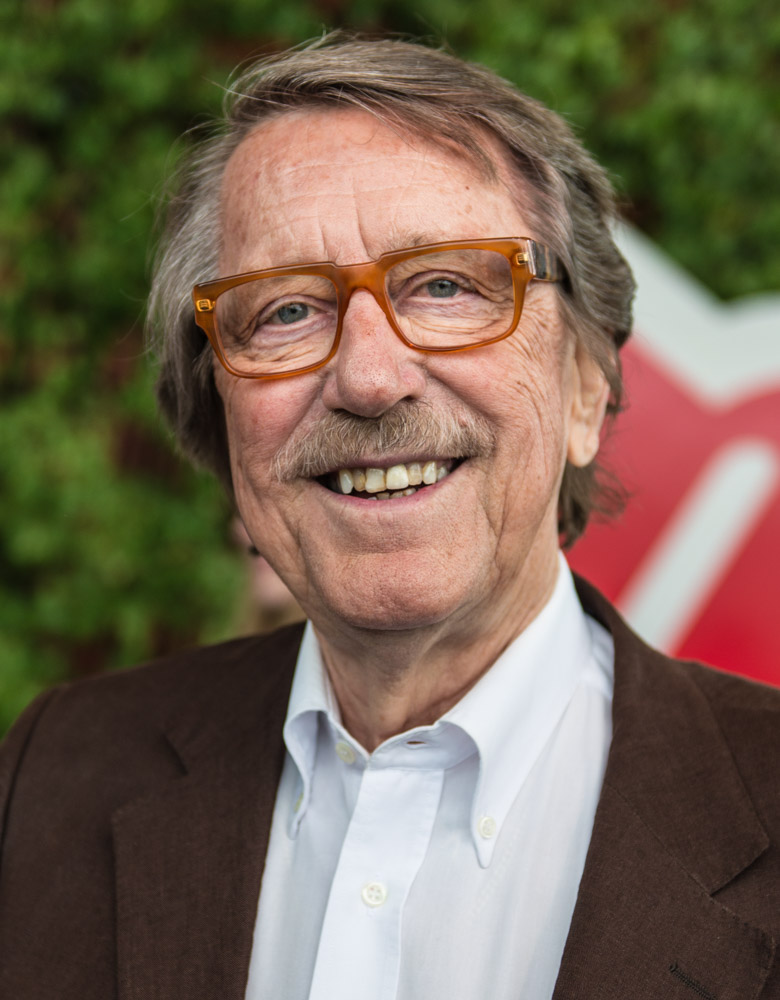
- Lönnå in 2015

Background information
- Born: 13 July 1936; Smedjebacken, Sweden
- Died: 10 May 2022 (aged 85)
- Instrument: Piano
- Years active: 1953–2022

Kjell Olov Lönnå (13 July 1936 – 10 May 2022) was a Swedish choir leader, composer, and TV host.

Lönnå was one of the national conductors for the National Swedish Choir Association (Svenska körförbundet). He is best known for his hosting of several national television shows from the late 1970s until the late 1990s.

Lönnå was a Baptist and is the writer of several hymns, at least one of which is included in the current edition of Den Svenska Psalmboken.

Lönnå died on 10 May 2022, at the age of 85.
