= Rock-Olga =

Swedish singer (1940–2010)

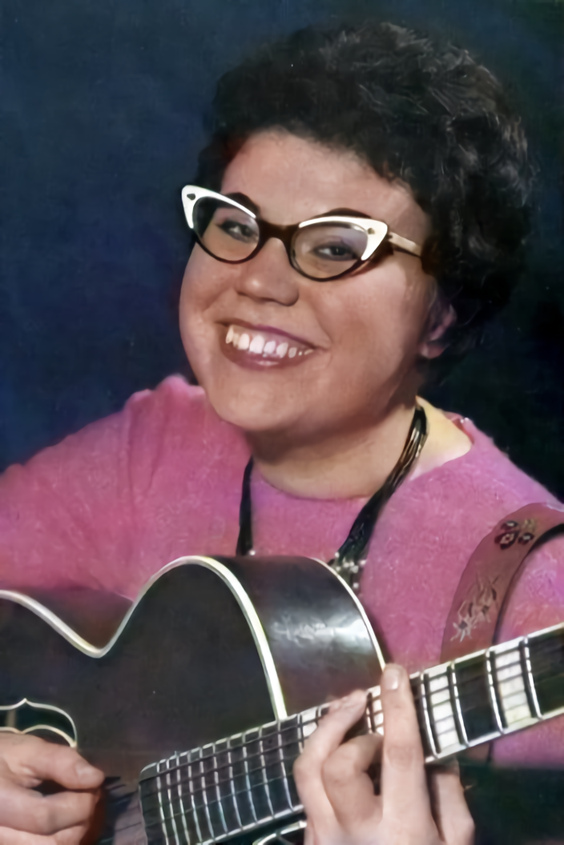
- Rock-Olga in 1959

Background information
- Also known as: Rock-Olga
- Born: Birgit Jacobsson; 16 March 1940; Gävle, Sweden
- Died: 10 June 2010 (aged 70) Borås, Sweden
- Genres: Rock
- Occupation: Singer
- Instrument: Guitar
- Years active: 1958–2010

Birgit Magnusson (née Jacobsson, 16 March 1940 – 10 June 2010), known by the stage name Rock-Olga, was a Swedish singer. She was one of Sweden's first rock musicians during the 1950s. She won her stage name via a bet with another singer who used the same name. She was a founding member of two bands, Trio med Olga and Hafvsbandet.

== Career ==
At the beginning of her career, in 1958, she was working as a warden at Ulleråkers sjukhus, a mental institution and hospital, where she used to play her guitar during breaks to entertain her colleagues. Her friends entered her in a talent competition called Ungdom med ton (English: Youth with tones). Rock-Olga performed a cover of the 1957 Micki Marlo–Paul Anka duet "What You've Done to Me" and won the competition. The song also became her first hit and made her one of the first rock stars in Sweden. At the time, another singer known as Stockholms-Olga also used the stage name Rock-Olga. The two artists made a bet with each other, that whichever of them won a significant song competition would also have exclusive right to the stage name.

After winning the song competition, Jacobsson travelled to Stockholm with her father, hoping to perform at the popular Nalens dance hall. She would later recall her father talking with the manager of Nalens, Topsy Lindblom, who first stated that "lots of daughters can sing", but then relented and asked her to come in when Jacobsson's father stated "Yes but she can sing rock". Her first performance at Nalens caused the resident rock band members to leave their dressing rooms to watch the performance, something that had never happened before. Her solo career peaked in the early part of the 1960s. In 1968, she started her own danceband called Trio med Olga ("Trio with Olga").

During the 1970s and the 1980s, she was one of the founding members of the rock and gammaldans band Hafvsbandet along with her husband Lars-Christer Magnusson and others. Both prior to and after her time in Hafvsbandet, Rock-Olga performed with another rock band called Rockfolket ("The Rock People").

In 1972, she recorded an album called Rock Olga Today with three members of the fledgling, soon-to-be-named pop group ABBA: Benny Andersson on piano, Agnetha Fältskog and Anni-Frid Lyngstad as backing vocals. She also participated in Allsång på Skansen (Sing-along at Skansen), which was broadcast on Sveriges Television in 2008. In later years, she still travelled across Sweden performing as many as 30 concerts per year, usually at retirement homes where "What You've Done to Me" was always part of her set.

== Death ==
Rock-Olga developed a fever after performing at Gröna Lund on 8 May 2010, and was subsequently diagnosed with blood poisoning from a cut on her toe. She died from complications on 10 June 2010.
