= The Boppers =

Swedish rock band

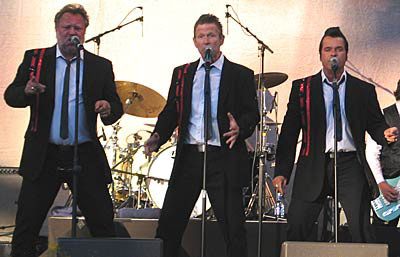
- The Boppers at Gröna Lund 2004; from left to right Ingemar Wallén, Matte Lagerwall and Peter Jezewski

Background information
- Origin: Hässelby, Sweden
- Genres: Rock; rock and roll; doo-wop
- Years active: 1977–present
- Labels: T-Bone; Sound of Scandinavia; RCA; Sonet; Scranta; Bonnier Music; Warner
- Members: Matte Lagerwall; Ingemar Wallén; Kenneth Björnlund; Surjo Benigh
- Website: www.boppers.se

The Boppers are a Swedish band formed in 1977 who found fame with cover versions of 1950s and 1960s songs.

== History ==
The band was formed by two brothers, Michel and Peter Jezewski (then 22 and 20 years old) and Ville and Ingemar Wallén (then 19 and 22 years old respectively), as well as their friends Mats Lagerwall (then 20 years old) and Lasse Westerberg (then 18 years old). They soon got a large number of gigs. Their debut album Number 1 in 1978 was originally only a minor, but went on to become one of the best-selling albums in Sweden, selling over 420,000 copies. They gained mainstream success in 1979 with their second album Keep On Boppin', which topped the charts and has sold a similar number of copies. At the same time, the group slimmed down and got their standard line-up in Ingemar Wallén (vocals, guitar), Mats Lagerwall (vocals, guitar), Peter Jezewski (vocals, bass) and Ville Wallén (vocals, drums).

Already from the second album, the Boppers started touring around the world. Their album was even released in Spanish and they had some success in Japan, where one of their albums, Live 'n' roll, was recorded there in 1981. However, soon Wallén left and was replaced by Kenneth Björnlundh, who has been performing with them since. The group's popularity waned in the mid-1980s . The album Black Label, which came out in 1983, for example, did not sell very well. Jezewski tried his hand at a solo career in the mid-1980s, but did not find success.

However, the band returned to the limelight largely due to Jerry Williams. The Boppers performed at Williams' successful concert at the Hamburger Börs and accompanied him on his tour of Sweden in the late 1980s. The band made a new record deal with Sonet and had a hit in 1991 with the song "Jeannie's Coming Back " and have since released several records. Their last album, Great Kicks, was released in 2017 on Warner Music.

In 1993, Peter Jezewski left the band shortly after the release of the album Tempted, to pursue his own solo career. In 2001, the Boppers got an unexpected collaboration in Markoolio whom they met on a tour. They recorded the song "Rocka på" together, and got their first big hit since "Jeannie's Coming Back". With the help of Markoolio's more youthful audience, the group gained more record buyers and a new wave of success. In 2002, all the original members, Ville Wallén, Mats Lagerwall, Ingmar Wallén, Peter Jezewski and Lasse Westerberg, were reunited in the television program Bingolotto. In the autumn of 2003, the Boppers played in the show Jerka at Stora Teatern, Gothenburg together with Jerry Williams.

Drummer Ville Wallén died on 26 November 2003.

== Discography ==
=== Albums ===
==== Studio albums ====
Title	Album details	Peak chart positions		
Title	Album details	SWE	FIN	NOR
Number 1	Released: July 1978; Label: T-Bone; Formats: LP, MC	2	14	—
Keep On Boppin'	Released: October 1979; Label: Sound of Scandinavia; Formats: LP, MC	1	6	36
Fan-Pix	Released: November 1980; Label: Sound of Scandinavia; Formats: LP, MC	8	—	—
News	Released: February 1982; Label: Sound of Scandinavia; Formats: LP, MC	45	—	—
High Fidelity	Released: 1982; Label: Sound of Scandinavia; Formats: LP, MC	—	—	—
Black Label	Released: 1983; Label: RCA; Formats: LP, MC	—	—	—
The Boppers	Released: October 1991; Label: Sonet; Formats: CD, LP, MC	4	—	—
Tempted	Released: October 1993; Label: Sonet; Formats: CD, MC	17	—	—
Back on Track	Released: November 1997; Label: EMBE; Formats: CD	—	—	—
På andra sidan stan	Released: May 2000; Label: Scranta; Formats: CD	—	—	—
Happy Birthday – 50 Years of Rock 'n' Roll	Released: 2004; Label: Stockholm; Formats: CD	—	—	—
Jingle Bell Rock	Released: November 2006; Label: Bonnier Music; Formats: CD	21	—	—
30	Released: 25 April 2007; Label: Bonnier Music; Formats: CD, digital download	19	—	—
Vibrations	Released: 22 April 2009; Label: Bonnier Music; Formats: CD, digital download	7	—	—
Great Kicks	Released: 30 June 2017; Label: Warner Music; Formats: CD, LP, digital download	17	—	—
White Lightning	Released: 1 July 2022; Label: Wild Kingdom; Formats: CD, LP, digital download	40	—	—
"—" denotes releases that did not chart or were not released in that territory.

==== Live albums ====
Title	Album details	Peak chart positions
Title	Album details	SWE
Live 'n' Roll	Released: 1982; Label: SOS Recording; Formats: LP	—
Unplugged Favourites	Released: June 1992; Label: Sonet; Formats: CD, LP, MC	10
At the Hop! Live at Akkurat	Released: 7 November 2012; Label: Atenzia; Formats: 2xCD, digital download	—
"—" denotes releases that did not chart.

==== Compilation albums ====
Title	Album details	Peak chart positions
Title	Album details	SWE
20 Rock 'n Boppin' Greats	Released: March 1980; Label: Warwick; Formats: LP, MC; UK-only release	—
Special Selection	Released: 1981; Label: Sound of Scandinavia; Formats: LP	—
Best of the Boppers	Released: 1981; Label: Swedisc; Formats: LP; Japan-only release	—
Rock 'n' Roll Music	Released: 1982; Label: Swedisc; Formats: LP; Japan-only release	—
Greatest Hits	Released: 1984; Label: Moondisc; Formats: MC	—
The Best of the Boppers	Released: 1990; Label: Hawk; Formats: CD, 2xLP, MC	—
68 Songs with the Boppers	Released: 1990; Label: Hawk; Formats: 3xCD, 5xLP	—
The Best of the Boppers Volume 2	Released: 1991; Label: Hawk; Formats: CD, MC	—
The Best of the Boppers Volume 3	Released: 1992; Label: Hawk; Formats: CD	—
14 Ballads	Released: 1992; Label: EMI; Formats: CD, MC	—
Jukebox Hits	Released: 1994; Label: Pickwick Music; Formats: CD, MC	—
Det bästa med Jerry Williams & Boppers	Released: 1995; Label: Ravelli Music; Formats: 3xCD	—
The Very Best 1978–1996	Released: December 1996; Label: MIA Music; Formats: CD, MC	50
Goodnight Sweet Heart	Released: 1998; Label: Mariann; Formats: CD, MC	—
16 Hits	Released: 1998; Label: Sonnet; Formats: CD	—
Bästa	Released: 2000; Label: Sonnet; Formats: CD	—
25 Years Still Boppin'	Released: April 2002; Label: Bonnier Music; Formats: 2xCD	5
Pärlor	Released: 2007; Label: Bonnier Music; Formats: CD	—
Best of 40 Years 1977–2017	Released: 28 April 2017; Label: Bebopaluba; Formats: 2xCD; Peter Jezewski compilation album featuring his work with the Boppers	48
"—" denotes releases that did not chart or were not released in that territory.

==== Video albums ====
Title	Album details
30 Years 'n Almost Grown – Live in Västerås	Released: 2008; Label: Prolounge; Formats: DVD

=== EPs ===
Title	Album details	Peak chart positions
Title	Album details	SWE
Back to the Hop	Released: April 1979; Label: Sound of Scandinavia; Formats: 7"	5
4 Track EP	Released: 2006; Label: Bonnier Music; Formats: CD	—
"—" denotes releases that did not chart.

=== Singles ===
Title	Year	Peak chart positions	Album
Title	Year	SWE	Album
"Remember Then"	1978	—	Number 1
"Who Put the Bomp" (Spain-only release)	1979	—	Number 1
"At the Hop" (Germany-only release)	1979	—	Number 1
"I'm in Love All Over Again"	1979	—	Keep On Boppin'
"White Christmas"	1979	11	Non-album single
"TV Hop" / "Do That Boppin' Jive"	1980	— 16	Fan-Pix
"Tick Tock" (Spain-only release)	1980	—	Keep On Boppin'
"Más, dáme más amor (I'm in Love All Over Again)" (Spain-only release)	1980	—	Keep On Boppin'
"Angela" (Japan-only release)	1980	—	Keep On Boppin'
"Listen to the Music"	1981	—	Fan-Pix
"Rama Lama Ding Dong"	1981	—	Fan-Pix
"C'-mon and Dance" (Japan-only release)	1981	—	Fan-Pix
"Umbrella" (Japan-only release)	1981	—	Best of the Boppers
"Turn Me Loose"	1981	—	Non-album single
"The Night for Love" (Japan-only release)	1982	—	Rock 'n' Roll Music
"She'd Rather Be with Me" (Netherlands-only release)	1982	—	Non-album single
"Holy Cow (What's Goin' On Around Here)" (Japan-only release)	1982	—	Live 'n' Roll
"Mr. Bassman" (Japan-only release)	1982	—	Keep On Boppin'
"Kissing in the Moonlight"	1990	—	The Boppers
"The Mix"	1990	—	Non-album single
"Gonna Find My Angel"	1991	29	The Boppers
"If You See Her" (with Jerry Williams)	1991	28	Non-album single
"Jeannie's Coming Back"	1991	21	The Boppers
"All I Have to Do Is Dream"	1991	—	The Boppers
"Wake Up Little Susie"	1992	—	Unplugged Favourites
"Runaround Sue"	1992	—	Unplugged Favourites
"Hold Me Now"	1993	—	Tempted
"Tempted"	1993	—	Tempted
"Your Sister Told Me"	1994	—	Tempted
"Twang"	1994	—	Tempted
"Why Did You Break My Heart"	1997	—	Back on Track
"Pretty Little Angel"	1997	—	Back on Track
"My Love 4 You"	1997	—	Back on Track
"Kärlek vill väl alla ha" (promo-only release)	1998	—	Non-album single
"Dagny" (promo-only release)	2000	—	På andra sidan stan
"Ge mig ett tecken" (promo-only release)	2000	—	På andra sidan stan
"Himlen för mig" (promo-only release)	2000	—	På andra sidan stan
"Rocka På!" (with Markoolio)	2001	1	Tjock och lycklig
"Baby Come Back to Me (Morse Code of Love)" (promo-only release)	2002	—	25 Years Still Boppin'
"Surfin' Bird" (promo-only release)	2005	—	Non-album single
"Blue Blue Moon"	2007	—	30
"They Never Know" (with Eva Eastwood)	2015	—	Non-album single
"Wanna Be Your Man"	2017	—	Great Kicks
"2 Fools in Love"	2017	—	Great Kicks
"It's Christmas in Las Vegas"	2019	—	Non-album single
"Boom Boom"	2020	—	Non-album single
"Please Come Home for Christmas"/"Dig That Crazy Santa Claus"	2020	—	Non-album single
"I Surrender" (featuring Brolle & Rockabilly Fabulous)	2021	—	Non-album single
"The Way"	2024	—	Non-album single
"—" denotes releases that did not chart or were not released in that territory.
