= After Us (album) =

2019 album by Weeping Willows

Studio album by Weeping Willows
- Released: 22 March 2019
- Length: 35:53
- Label: Razzia; Sony Music Entertainment
- Producer: Barry Adamson

Weeping Willows chronology
Snowflakes (2017)	After Us (2019)	Songs of Winter (2021)

After Us is an album by the Swedish band Weeping Willows. It was released on 22 March 2019 and was produced by Barry Adamson. The main theme is climate change. Aftonbladet praised the lyrics. It debuted at number one on the Swedish Albums Chart and remained on the chart for eight weeks.

== Track listing ==
After Us track listing
No.	Title	Length
1.	"Butterfly"	3:37
2.	"Let Go"	3:31
3.	"Save Us from Ourselves"	3:12
4.	"I Travel with You"	3:42
5.	"Judgement Day"	2:57
6.	"Another Future"	3:29
7.	"Endless Sleep"	4:07
8.	"There's No Hiding Place"	3:36
9.	"Tombstones"	4:00
10.	"After Us"	3:42
Total length:		35:53

== Charts ==
Chart performance for After Us
Chart (2019)	Peak position
Swedish Albums (Sverigetopplistan)	1

== Certifications ==
Certifications for After Us
Region	Certification	Certified units/sales
Sweden (GLF)	Gold	15,000^{‡}
^{‡} Sales+streaming figures based on certification alone.
