= Hamburger Börs, Stockholm =

Coordinates: 59.3305°N 18.0692°E

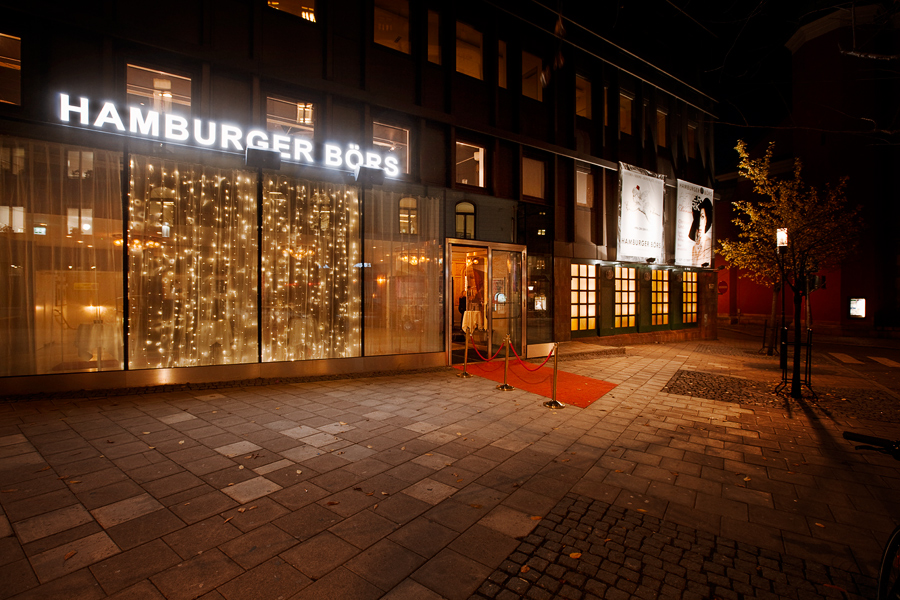
Entré

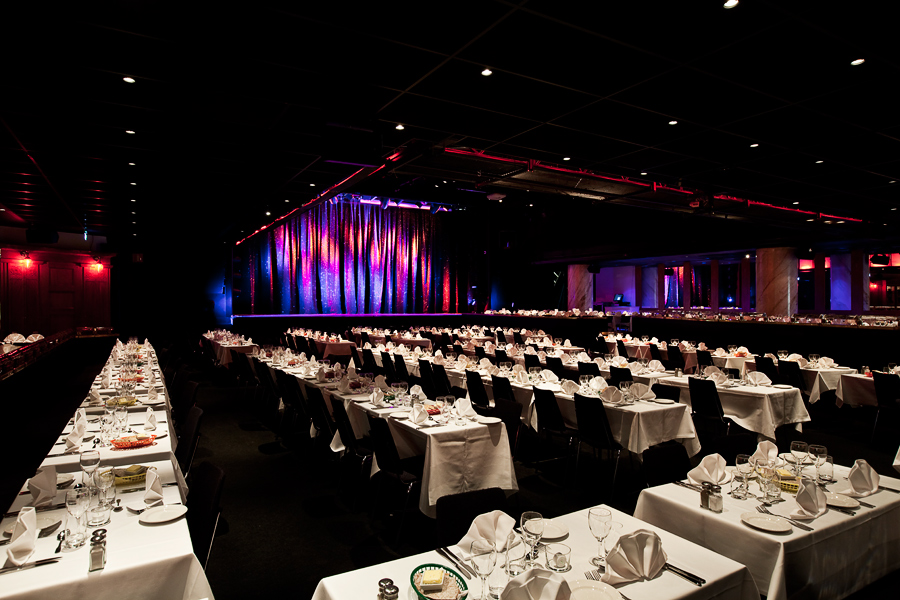
Room for 650 guest to dine before shows

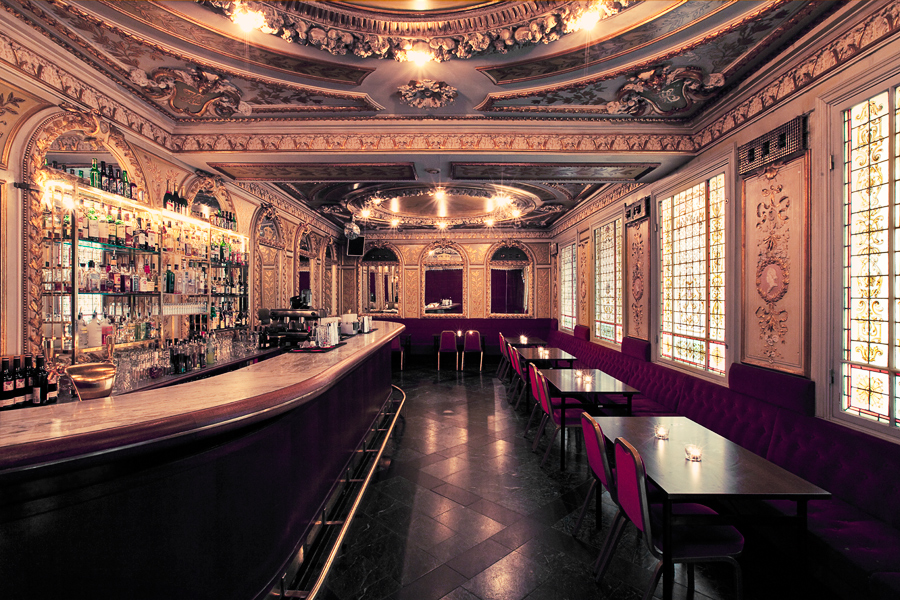
1800s bar

Hamburger Börs, or "Börsen", at Jakobsgatan in Stockholm is a stage for bar shows so called "krogshower" in Sweden. Many of Sweden's most famous singers have performed on the stage like Lill Lindfors, Monica Zetterlund, Povel Ramel, Lena Philipsson, Lill-Babs, Cornelis Vreeswijk, Björn Skifs and Jerry Williams. But also more world-famous singers like Sammy Davis Jr, Johnny Cash, Rod Stewart, Frank Sinatra and Liza Minnelli.

Since the early 2000s, Hamburger Börs has been the stage for the satire show Roligt Elakt Aktuellt.
