= 2017 in Swedish music =

The following events in Swedish music occurred in the year 2017.

== Events ==
=== January ===
Hallåjsan

=== February ===
- 4 – Melodifestivalen 2017 Semi-final 1 in Scandinavium, Gothenburg.
- 11 – Melodifestivalen 2017 Semi-final 2 in Malmö Arena, Malmö.
- 18 – Melodifestivalen 2017 Semi-final 3 in Vida Arena, Växjö.
- 25 – Melodifestivalen 2017 Semi-final 4 in Skellefteå Kraft Arena, Skellefteå.
- 28 - At Sweden's Grammis Awards ceremony, Zara Larsson receives the Artist of the Year award and Kent win both the Album of the Year and Rock Album of the Year.

=== March ===
- 4 – Melodifestivalen 2017 Second chance in Saab Arena, Linköping.
- 11
  - Melodifestivalen 2017 Final in Friends Arena, Stockholm.
  - Robin Bengtsson is selected as Sweden's representative in the Eurovision Song Contest 2017.

=== April ===
- 21 – The Gamlestaden Jazzfestival opened in Gothenburg, Sweden (April 21 – 29).

=== May ===
- 9 – The conductor Sofi Jeannin is appointed chief conductor of the BBC Singers, the first woman to hold the post, effective in July 2018.
- 13 – In the final of the Eurovision Song Contest 2017, Sweden finish in 5th place.
- 15 - The Swedish Chamber Orchestra appoints Martin Fröst its principal conductor effective from 2019, with an initial contract of 3 seasons.

=== June ===
- 7 – The 25th Sweden Rock Festival started in Norje (June 7 – 10).
- 28 – The 5th Bråvalla Festival opened near Norrköping (June 28 - July 1).

=== August ===
- 11 – Malmöfestivalen opened (August 11 – 18).
- 20
  - Choral conductor and mezzo-soprano Sofi Jeannin makes her Proms debut, conducting the BBC Singers and City of London Sinfonia in a Reformation Day concert.

=== October ===
- 6 – The 34th Stockholm Jazz Festival started (October 6 – 15).
- 25 – The 49th Umeå Jazz Festival started (October 25 – 29).

== Albums releases ==
=== January ===
Day	Album	Artist	Label	Notes	Ref.
13	In the Passing Light of Day	Pain of Salvation	Inside Out Music		
27	Meet Me At The Movies	Viktoria Tolstoy	ACT Music	Produced by Nils Landgren executive producer Siggi Loch	
27	Potsdamer Platz	Jan Lundgren	ACT Music	Produced by Siggi Loch	

=== February ===
Day	Album	Artist	Label	Notes	Ref.
24	Mitt liv	Charlotte Perrelli	Stockhouse		

=== March ===
Day	Album	Artist	Label	Notes	Ref.
3	For You	Léon	Columbia		
17	So Good	Zara Larsson	Epic		

=== May ===
Day	Album	Artist	Label	Notes	Ref.
12	Good Times	Mando Diao	BMG		
26	Liberetto III	Lars Danielsson	ACT Music	With Gregory Privat, John Parricelli and Magnus Öström	

=== June ===
Day	Album	Artist	Label	Notes	Ref.
30	Velocity	Waveshaper	unknown	6-track EP	

=== July ===
Day	Album	Artist	Label	Notes	Ref.
14	Long Live Life	Francobollo	Square Leg Records		

=== September ===
Day	Album	Artist	Label	Notes	Ref.
15	Provenance	Björn Meyer	ECM	Produced by Manfred Eicher	
22	Portrait of a Painted Lady	Kikki Danielsson	Capitol	Produced by Sören Karlsson, Idde Schultz	

=== October ===
Day	Album	Artist	Label	Notes	Ref.
27	Good Stuff	Iiro Rantala & Ulf Wakenius	ACT	Produced by Siggi Loch	
27	Heroes in Time	Metalite	Inner Wound Recordings	Produced by Jacob Hansen	

=== November ===
Day	Album	Artist	Label	Notes	Ref.
24	Vista	August Rosenbaum	Hiatus		

== Deaths ==
January

- 17 – Carina Jaarnek singer (born 1962).
- 24 – Björn Thelin, bassist for The Spotnicks, (born 1942).

February

- 1 – Robert Dahlqvist rock musician for The Hellacopters and Dundertåget, (born 1976).
- 8 – Tony Särkkä, black metal musician and multiinstrumentalist of Romani descent (Abruptum, Ophthalamia) (born 1972).
- 29 – Josefin Nilsson Swedish singer and actress (born 1969).

March

- 6 – Lars Diedricson, singer (Snowstorm) and songwriter ("Take Me to Your Heaven"), winner of the Eurovision Song Contest 1999 (born 1961).
- 22 – Sven-Erik Magnusson, musician (Sven-Ingvars) (born 1942).

September

- 12 – Siegfried Köhler, conductor of the Royal Swedish Opera, (born 1923).
- 25 – Folke Rabe, composer, (born 1935).

October

- 17 – Ingvar Lidholm, composer, (born 1921).
- 20 – Boris Lindqvist, rock singer, (born 1940).

November

- 17 – Rikard Wolff, pop singer and actor (born 1958).

== See also ==
- 2017 in Sweden
- Music of Sweden
- Sweden in the Eurovision Song Contest 2017
- List of number-one singles and albums in Sweden (see 2017 section on page)
