= 40 år i folkparkens tjänst =

Compilation album by Wizex
- Released: September 25, 2013
- Recorded: Wizex Ztudio, Bromölla, Sweden, mid 2013
- Genre: dansband music
- Label: Atenzia
- Producer: Eric Iversen

Wizex chronology
Simsalabim (2012)	40 år i folkparkens tjänst (2013)	Schlagers på väg (2014)

40 år i folkparkens tjänst is a 2013 Wizex compilation album, consisting of rerecordings. The album was released during the band's 40th anniversary year.

== Track listing ==
1. Miss Decibel (Lasse Holm, Gert Lengstrand)
2. Djupa vatten (Lars Diedricson, Ulf Georgsson)
3. Det vackraste som finns (Det vakreste som fins) (Rolf Løvland, Jan Teigen, Danne Stråhed)
4. Alla vill till himmelen (Måns Asplund, Jason Diakité)
5. Mjölnarens Iréne (Åke Gerhard, Leon Landgren)
6. När vi rör varann (Sometimes When We Touch) (Dan Hill, Ingela Forsman)
7. Tio mil kvar till Korpilombolo (Agnetha Fältskog, Björn Ulvaeus, Peter Himmelstrand)
8. Har du glömt (Jan Askerlind, Conny Modig)
9. En vagabond (Johan Langer, Jan Askerlind)
10. Fredagskväll i parken (Sara Varga, Lars Hägglund)
11. Jag är född till att skratta och le (Born with a Smile on my Face) (Roger Holman, Simon May, Lars Hagelin, Tommy Stjernfeldt)
12. Det är dej jag väntar på (Det' lige det) (Søren Bundgaard, Danne Stråhed)
13. Som en sång (Lasse Holm, Monica Forsberg)
14. Du förgyller mitt liv (Precious to Me) (Philip Seymour, Eric Iversen)
15. Skicka SMS (Sara Varga, Lars Hägglund)
16. Vägen hem (Karl-Gerhard Lundkvist)
17. Tusen och en natt (Lars Diedricson, Gert Lengstrand)
18. Jag kan se en ängel (Johnny Thunqvist, Kaj Svenling)

== Charts ==
Chart (2013)	Peak position
Sweden (Sverigetopplistan)	14
