= You Treated Me Wrong =

Studio album by Wizex
- Released: December 1980
- Genre: Dansband music
- Label: Mariann Records
- Producer: Lasse Holm, Torgny Söderberg

Wizex chronology
| Greatest Hits (1980) | You Treated Me Wrong (1980) | Nattfjäril (1982) |

You Treated Me Wrong is a 1980 studio album by Wizex. The album peaked at the 27th position on the Swedish albums chart.

== Track listing ==
=== Side 1 ===
| # | Title | Writer | Lead vocals |
|---|---|---|---|
| 1. | "Är du på väg (Woman in Love)" | Barry Gibb, Robin Gibb, Monica Forsberg | Kikki |
| 2. | "You Treated Me Wrong" | Alice May | Monica |
| 3. | "Take Me to the Promised Land" | Tommy Stjernfeldt | Tommy |
| 4. | "Forty Days" | Chuck Berry | Monica |
| 5. | "Broadway" | Lars Hagelin, Tommy Stjernfeldt | Tommy |
| 6. | "Drömmen" ("Dreamin'") | Leo Sayer, Alan Tarney, Björn Håkanson | Kikki |

=== Side 2 ===
| # | Title | Writer | Lead vocals |
|---|---|---|---|
| 7. | "Som du vill (Late at Night)" | Alice May, Monica Forsberg | Kikki |
| 8. | "Vill du dela med dig" | Anders Glenmark | Kikki |
| 9. | "När jag behövde dig mest (Just When i Needed You Most)" | Randy Vanwarmer, Ingela Forsman | Kikki |
| 10. | "Får jag bli din kvinna då" | Torgny Söderberg | Kikki & Monica |
| 11. | "Sakta lägger båten ut ifrån land (It's All Over Now, Baby Blue)" | Boy Dylan, Mikael Wiehe | Tommy |
| 12. | "Tala om" | Alice May, Bengt Sundström | Monica |
| 13. | "Sommarnatt" | Dille Diedricson, Torben Ferm | Tommy |

== Charts ==
| Chart (1980–1981) | Peak position |
|---|---|
| Sweden (Sverigetopplistan) | 27 |
