= Sommarnatt =

Single by Snowstorm

from the album Snowstorm
- A-side: "Sommarnatt"
- B-side: "Message"
- Released: 1980
- Genre: rock
- Songwriters: Lars Diedricson; Torben Ferm

"Sommarnatt" is a song written by Lars "Dille" Diedricson and Torben Ferm, and originally recorded by Snowstorm. Originally, it was released on the album Sommarnatt in 1980, and as a single the same year, with the B-side being "Message", an English-language version of the same song. The single peaked at number two in the Swedish singles chart.

A recording by Wizex, from the 1980 album You Treated Me Wrong, with vocals by Tommy Stjernfeldt, charted at Svensktoppen between 7 December 1980-1 February 1981, peaking at 6th position.

In 1989, Snowstorm released a new version, "Sommarnatt '89", peaking at number 13 on the Swedish singles chart.

== Charts ==
=== Sommarnatt, Snowstorm 1980 ===
Chart (1980)	Peak position
Sweden (Sverigetopplistan)	2

=== Sommarnatt '89, Snowstorm 1989 ===
Chart (1989)	Peak position
Sweden (Sverigetopplistan)	13
