= Take Me to Your Heaven =

Take Me to Your Heaven may refer to:

- "Take Me to Your Heaven" (song), by Charlotte Nilson
  - Tusen och en natt (album), the song's album
- Take Me to Your Heaven (album), by Stevie Woods
