= Some Girls & Trouble Boys =

Studio album by Wizex
- Released: December 1979
- Studio: KMH Studios, Stockholm
- Genre: dansband music
- Label: Mariann Records
- Producer: Lasse Holm

Wizex chronology
Carousel (1978)	Some Girls & Trouble Boys (1979)	Greatest Hits (1980)

Some Girls & Trouble Boys is a 1979 Wizex studio album. The album peaked at #21 in the Swedish albums chart.

== Track listing ==
=== Side 1 ===
#	Title	Writer	Length
1.	"När vi rör varann (Sometimes When We Touch)"	Barry Mann, Dan Hill, Ingela Forsman	?
2.	"Hit and Miss, Judy"	Wreckless Eric	?
3.	"Starry Night"	Lasse Holm	?
4.	"Sunday Girl"	Chris Stein	?
5.	"Trouble Boys"	Billy Murray	?
6.	"När inga ord räcker till (We Don't Talk Anymore)"	Alan Tarney, Boson	?
7.	"På snabba vingar"	Lars Hagelin, Tommy Stjernfeldt	?

=== Side 2 ===
#	Titlle	Writer	Length
8.	"El Lute"	Alice May, Monica Forsberg	?
9.	"Some Girls"	Frank Farian, Fred Jay, Margot Borgström	?
10.	"Oh Susie"	Mike Chapman, Nicky Chinn	?
11.	"You Needed Me"	Björn Håkanson, Tim Norell	?
12.	"Sången skall klinga"	Lasse Holm	
13.	"Come on over"	Barry Gibb, Robin Gibb	?
14.	"Lucille (Du har lurat mej)"	Torgny Söderberg	?

== Charts ==
Chart (1979–1980)	Peak position
Sweden (Sverigetopplistan)	21
