= Linda Dahl =

Swedish singer and former Angel member (born 1972)

- Born: Linda Sofie Jansson; 27 July 1972 (age 54); Degerfors Parish, Värmland, Sweden
- Spouse: Peter Dahl (m. 2007)
- Musical career
- Instruments: Vocals, keyboard
- Formerly of: Angel

Linda Sofie Dahl (née Jansson; born 27 July 1972) is a Swedish vocalist and songwriter. She is most commonly known as the former lead singer of Angel in the early 1990s, which is famous for their hit singles "Sommaren i City" and "Venus Butterfly". She is also a co-writer of "When Spirits Are Calling My Name".

== Biography ==
Linda Jansson is born and raised in Degerfors, Sweden. In 1991 at 19 years of age, she and three other girls formed the all girl band Angel. They made success with their hit single "Sommaren i City". Nine years later, she co-wrote "When Spirits Are Calling My Name" together with Peter Dahl and Thomas Holmstrand. It won the 2000 Melodifestivalen and reached 7th place in the 2000 Eurovision Song Contest. They have also written and composed songs for Streaplers, Sten & Stanley, Drifters, BlackJack, and many others.

In 2007, she married Peter Dahl, thus changing to her present-day surname. After the 2010 Haiti earthquake, she and Åsa Karlström wrote the song "Vi kan alla göra nåt" (lit. 'we can all do something') for the Dansband för Haiti initiative. It was released as a single and all of its revenue was donated to Doctors Without Borders. She also participated in S.O.S – A Tribute to Abba until 2012. In October the same year, she and her husband was awarded "Degerfors Citizen of the Year". In 2017, the married couple started the Meadow Creek duo and released their first album 'Til death do us part in December the same year.
