= Angel (Swedish band) =

1990s Swedish girl pop band

- Origin: Degerfors, Sweden
- Genres: Pop
- Years active: early 1990s
- Members: Linda Jansson; Jessica Larsson; Maria Zaring; Linda Gustavsson
- Past members: Anna Åkesson

Angel was a Swedish girl pop group from Degerfors, Sweden in the early 1990s. They debuted with their single "Sommaren i City" and have only released one album ever since. Later, the band did a come back with several reunion shows.

== History ==
In 1991, the band was formed by Linda Jansson, Jessica Larsson, Maria Zaring and Linda Gustavsson. They originated from Degerfors and Karlskoga respectively, and gained major fame with their debut single "Sommaren i City" when it was released the same year. It was co-written by Bobby Ljunggren and peaked 7th place in the Topplistan (present-day Sverigetopplistan) charts upon its release. A year later, the band released Äventyr i Natten, its first and only studio album. Following the album release, they participated in the 1992 Melodifestivalen with the song "Venus Butterfly".

Although the band had effectively discontinued all recording and touring by the 2000s, band member Linda Jansson independently co-wrote the 2000 Melodifestivalen-winning song "When Spirits Are Calling My Name" for Roger Pontare to perform. In August 2007, the band performed several reunion shows, including at the Stockholm Pride schlager evening and the Sommarkrysset television program.

== Members ==
- Linda Jansson (now Dahl) – vocals, keyboard
- Jessica Larsson (now Wagnsson) – bass
- Maria Zaring (now Skaug) – guitar
- Linda Gustavsson – drums

== Discography ==
- Äventyr i Natten (1992)
