= Carousel (Wizex album) =

Studio album by Wizex
- Released: November 1978
- Studio: KMH Studios
- Genre: dansband music
- Label: Mariann Records
- Producer: Lasse Holm

Wizex chronology
Miss Decibel (1978)	Carousel (1978)	Some Girls & Trouble Boys (1979)

Carousel is a 1978 Wizex studio album. The album peaked at No. 7 in the Swedish albums chart. The album includes the Svensktoppen hit song "Se dig i din spegel".

== Track listing ==
=== Side A ===
#	Title	Writer	Length
1.	" Mitt liv går runt som en karusell (U.S. of America)"	Donna Fargo, Margot Borgström	2:35
2.	"Blås alla vindar"	Lars Hagelin, Tommy Stjernfeldt, Monica Forsberg	2:40
3.	"Oh Carol"	Mike Chapman, Nicky Chinn	3:09
4.	"If I Sing You a Love Song"	Ronnie Scott, Steve Wolfe	4:01
5.	"Skateboard (Run Run Run)"	Alan Carvell, Brian Keith, Björn Håkanson, S. Schröder	2:45
6.	"You Never Can Tell"	Chuck Berry	3:00
7.	"Är du rädd att bli ensam (Have You Never Been Mellow)"	John Farrar, Britt Lindeborg	3:19

=== Side B ===
#	Title	Writer	Length
8.	"Please Change Your Mind"	Benny Andersson, Björn Ulvaeus	3:01
9.	"It's the Same Old Song"	Lamont Dozier, Brian Holland, Eddie Holland	3:26
10.	"Väntar du på sommaren"	Lars Hagelin, Tommy Stjernfeldt, Monica Forsberg	2:51
11.	"(Let's Have) a Party"	Jessie mae Robinson	2:01
12.	"Ditt spel är slut"	Lars Hagelin, Tommy Stjernfeldt, Margot Borgström	3:17
13.	"Se dig i din spegel"	Lasse Holm, Monica Forsberg	3:33
14.	"Nära dig"	Lars Hagelin, Tommy Stjernfeldt, Gert Lengstrand	3:08

== Charts ==
Chart (1978–1979)	Peak position
Sweden	7
