= Äventyr i natten =

Studio album by Angel
- Released: 1992
- Recorded: 1991–1992
- Studio: Trippel Studio
- Genre: Pop rock
- Length: 35:41
- Language: Swedish
- Label: Polydor Records
- Producer: Bobby Lundgren, Håkan Almqvist

Singles from Äventyr i natten
- 1. "Sommaren i city" Released: 1991; 2. "Venus butterfly" Released: 1992; 3. "Äventyr i natten" Released: 1992; 4. "Cabriolet" Released: 1992

Äventyr i natten (lit. 'adventures in the night') is the only studio album by Angel, a Swedish girl pop band. The album was released in 1992 by Polydor Records and the band participated at Melodifestivalen with the song "Venus butterfly". The hit single "Sommaren i city", which peaked 7th place in Topplistan (present-day Sverigetopplistan) a year earlier, appeared on the album. The producers were the mane Bobby Ljunggren and mane Håkan Almqvist.

== Track listing ==
No.	Title	Writer(s)	Length
1.	"Äventyr i natten"		3:40
2.	"Kom, om du vill ha mej"		3:43
3.	"Cabriolet"	Peter Karlsson, Sylvia Cederberg	3:28
4.	"Ge och ta"		3:44
5.	"Hallå hej minns du mej"		3:31
6.	"Sommaren i city"		3:41
7.	"Bilder av dej"	Linda Jansson, Maria Zaring	3:11
8.	"Venus butterfly"	Bert Karlsson, Lennart Clerwall	3:04
9.	"Flyget till Stockholm"		2:41
10.	"Kommer aldrig att få dig"	Torbjörn Russlander	3:47
11.	"Äventyr i gryningen (postludium)"		1:05
Total length:			35:41

== Personnel ==
=== Angel ===
- Linda Jansson: Vocals
- Maria Zaring: Electric and acoustic guitars, backing vocals
- Jessica Larsson: Bass, backing vocals
- Linda Gustavsson: Drums

=== Additional Personnel ===
- Bobby Ljunggren, Benny Jansson: Guitars
- Håkan Almqvist: Bass, keyboards, backing vocals
- Patric Fransson, Thomas Walther, Lilling Palmeklint: Backing vocals
