= Da Man (album) =

Studio album by Frans
- Released: December 2006
- Recorded: 2005/06
- Genre: Pop
- Label: Universal Music AB

Frans chronology
Da Man (2006)	Present (2020)

Singles from Da Man
- 1. "Who's da Man" Released: 17 May 2006; 2. "Kul med Jul" Released: 4 December 2006

Da Man is the debut studio album by Swedish singer Frans. It was released in December 2006 in Sweden through Universal Music AB. It has peaked at number 20 on the Swedish Albums Chart. The album includes the singles "Who's da Man" and "Kul med Jul".

== Singles ==
"Who's da Man" was released as the lead single from the album on 17 May 2006. The song peaked to number one on the Swedish Singles Chart. The song is a praise of the football player Zlatan Ibrahimović. "Kul med Jul" was released as the second single from the album on 4 December 2006. The song peaked at number 24 on the Swedish Singles Chart.

== Track listing ==
CD 1
No.	Title	Length
1.	"Sicket harligt liv"
2.	"Så grym" (feat. Elias)
3.	"Elvis and Me"
4.	"Min lillebror"
5.	"That's Me"
6.	"Who's da Man"
7.	"Turn down the light"
8.	"Kul med Jul"

CD 2 (Bonus CD)
No.	Title	Length
1.	"Kul med Jul" (Xmas Clubbing Remix)
2.	"Who's da Man" (No Limit Remix)
3.	"Who's da Man" (English)
4.	"Who's da Man" (Karaoke)
5.	"Kul med Jul" (Karaoke)
6.	"Kul med Jul" (Video)
7.	"Who's da Man" (Video)

== Charts performance ==
=== Weekly charts ===
Chart (2006)	Peak position
Swedish Albums (Sverigetopplistan)	20

== Release history ==
Region	Date	Format	Label
Sweden	December 2006	Digital download	Universal Music AB
