= Young Like Us =

Single by Frans
- Released: 24 June 2016
- Recorded: 2015
- Genre: Pop
- Length: 3:31
- Label: Cardiac Records
- Songwriter(s): Fredrik Andreas Andersson, Frans Jeppsson Wall, Michael Saxell, Oscar Carl Söderberg

Frans singles chronology
"If I Were Sorry" (2016)	"Young Like Us" (2016)	"Liar" (2017)

"Young Like Us" is a song by Swedish singer Frans. It was released as a digital download and on streaming sites on 24 June 2016 through Cardiac Records. The song debuted and peaked at number 89 on the Swedish Singles Chart.

== Track listing ==
Digital download
No.	Title	Length
1.	"Young Like Us"	3:31

== Chart performance ==
=== Weekly charts ===
Chart (2016)	Peak position
Sweden (Sverigetopplistan)	89

== Release date ==
Region	Date	Format	Label
Various	24 June 2016	Digital download; streaming	Cardiac Records
