= Sången skall klinga =

Song by Wizex

from the album "Some Girls & Trouble Boys"
- Language: Swedish
- Released: 1979
- Genre: dansband
- Label: Mariann
- Songwriter: Lasse Holm
- Composer: Lasse Holm

"Sången skall klinga" or "Sången ska klinga" is a song written by Lasse Holm and originally recorded by Wizex, with Kikki Danielsson on lead vocals for the 1979 album Some Girls & Trouble Boys. The song depicts a woman who feels new-born when meeting someone new and following her.

The song became a major Svensktoppen hit, staying at the chart for ten weeks from 3 February through 6 April 1980, and after two second-places it topped the chart for the third week. In 2008, the song became available on the Kikki Danielsson compilation album Kikkis bästa.

In 1980, the song was recorded by Ekelunds for the album Dansglädje 2, and in 1983, Thorleifs recorded it for the album Saxgodingar 2.

The song has been rewritten in Norwegian, with lyrics by Geir Hamnes as "Sangen skal klinge". With those lyrics, it was recorded by Bente Lind in 1981.
