= Liar (Frans song) =

Single by Frans
- Released: 26 May 2017
- Recorded: 2016
- Genre: Pop
- Length: 2:56
- Label: Cardiac Records
- Songwriter(s): Fredrik Andreas Andersson, Frans Jeppsson Wall, Michael Saxell
- Producer(s): Fredrik Andersson

Frans singles chronology
"Young Like Us" (2016)	"Liar" (2017)	"Loving U" (2018)

"Liar" is a song by Swedish singer Frans. It was released as a digital download in Sweden on 26 May 2017 through Cardiac Records. The song did not enter the Swedish Singles Chart, but peaked at number four on the Swedish Heatseeker Chart.

== Music video ==
A music video to accompany the release of "Liar" was first released onto YouTube on 26 May 2017 at a total length of three minutes and nine seconds.

== Track listing ==
Digital download
No.	Title	Length
1.	"Liar"	2:56

== Charts ==
Chart (2017)	Peak position
Swedish Heatseeker Chart (Sverigetopplistan)	4

== Release date ==
Region	Date	Format	Label
Sweden	26 May 2017	Digital download; streaming	Cardiac Records
