= Nattfjäril =

Studio album by Wizex
- Released: April 1982
- Genre: dansband music
- Label: Mariann Records
- Producer: Lennart Sjöholm

Wizex chronology
You Treated Me Wrong (1980)	Nattfjäril (1982)	Julie (1983)

Nattfjäril is a Wizex studio album, released in April 1982. The album peaked at 21st position at the Swedish albums chart. The album is the band's final with Kikki Danielsson as vocalist.

== Track listing ==
=== Side A ===
#	Title	Writer	Length
1.	"Ljuset i din natt"	Anders Glenmark	?
2.	"Nattens sista ängel (Angel of the Morning)"	Chip Taylor, Ronnie Carlsson	?
3.	"Help Get Me Some Help"	Nelly Byl, Daniel Vangarde	?
4.	"Att det kan vara så svårt att vara ensam (If You Think You Know)"	Mike Chapman, Nicky Chinn, Tommy Stjernfeldt	?
5.	"There's a Guy Works Down the Chip Shop Swears He's Elvis"	Kirsty MacColl, Rambow	?
6.	"När dimman lättar"	Tommy Stjernfeldt	?

=== Side B ===
#	Title	Writer	Length
7.	"Nattfjäril"	Lars Hagelin, Tommy Stjernfeldt	?
8.	"Tåget måste gå"	Tommy Stjernfeldt	?
9.	"Queen of Hearts"	Hank Devito	?
10.	"Good Year for the Roses"	Jerry Chesnut	?
11.	"Bränner som eld (Shot Full of Love)"	Bob Mcdill, Danielsson	?
12.	"Johnny Rocker"	Tommy Stjernfeldt	?
13.	"All Alone Am I (Min ton rotas ton ourano)"	Manos Hadjidakis, Arthur Altman	?

== Personnel ==
- Vocals – Kikki Danielsson
- Guitar, vocals – Thommy Stjernfeldt
- Guitar – Tommy Karlsson
- Piano, synthesizer – Lars Hagelin
- Electric bass – Mats Nilsson
- Drums – Jerker Nilsson
- Producer – Lennart Sjöholm

== Charts ==
Chart (1982)	Peak position
Sweden (Sverigetopplistan)	21
