= Frans Jeppsson Wall =

Swedish singer-songwriter (born 1998)

Frans
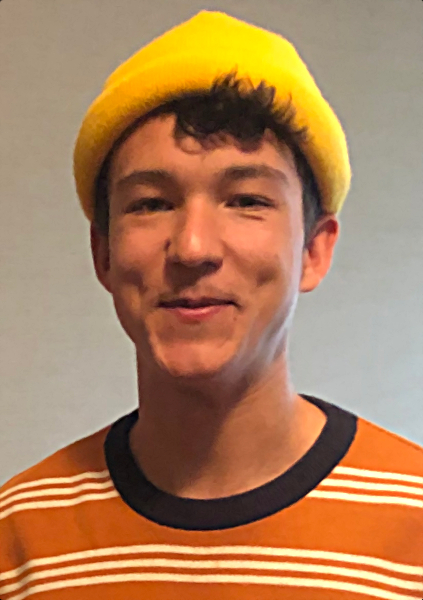
- Jeppsson Wall in 2019

Background information
- Born: 19 December 1998 (age 27); Ystad, Scania, Sweden
- Occupations: singer; songwriter
- Instrument: Vocals
- Years active: 2006–present

Frans Jeppsson Wall (born 19 December 1998), also known mononymously as Frans, is a Swedish singer-songwriter. He represented host nation Sweden in the Eurovision Song Contest 2016 in Stockholm with the song "If I Were Sorry", finishing in fifth place.

== Life and career ==
=== 2006–2015: Early career ===
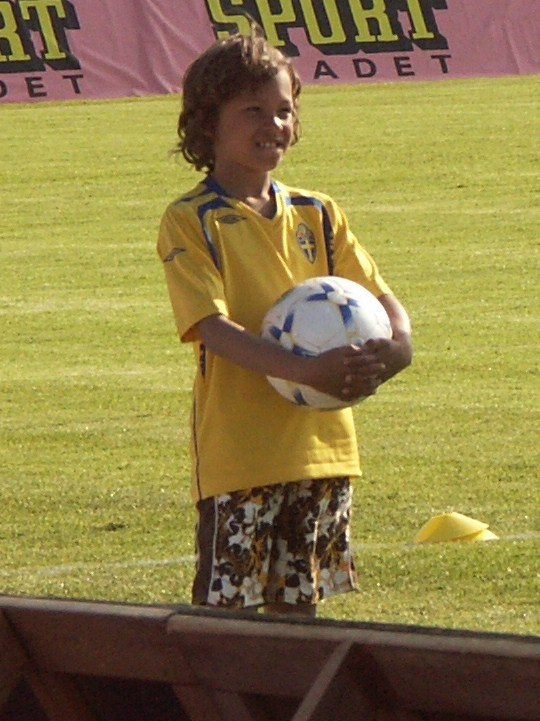
Frans Jeppsson Wall in 2008 during the time of his second chart topper "Fotbollsfest"

Jeppsson Wall was born in Ystad, Sweden. His father Mark was born in Nigeria to a Nigerian mother and a British father. At the age of eight, Mark moved to London. Jeppsson Wall's mother is Swedish. He was thus raised speaking both English and Swedish. During most of his life, Jeppsson Wall has been a part-time resident in London and he also studied music there for an entire year when he was 15 at The Norwood School. He has a younger brother named Casper and a twin sister, named Filippa. He is best known for his football anthems with the band Elias, including the 2006 hit "Who's da Man", dedicated to Swedish footballer Zlatan Ibrahimović. The song, credited to Elias and featuring vocals by Frans, stayed at the top of Sverigetopplistan, the official Swedish Singles Chart, for 13 weeks.

For Christmas 2006, he scored a minor hit with his song "Kul med Jul" (English: Fun with Christmas), which peaked at number 24 on the Swedish singles chart. Another sports-related chart entering by Frans was the 2008 song "Fotbollsfest", a song launched in support of the Sweden men's national football team. The song peaked at number one on the Swedish singles chart, which it did in its second week of charting.

=== 2016–present: Melodifestivalen and Eurovision ===
After years of absence from music, Frans returned with his participation in Melodifestivalen 2016 in a bid to represent Sweden at the Eurovision Song Contest 2016 with the song "If I Were Sorry", which he co-wrote with Oscar Fogelström, Michael Saxell and Fredrik Andersson. He performed it in Gävle during the fourth and last semi-final leg of the competition on 27 February 2016, going on to secure a place in the final on 12 March 2016 in Stockholm, Sweden.

Immediately after his performance, the single was released. It became very popular and went straight to number one of Sverigetopplistan during the first week following its release. It also charted on the Spotify Viral charts in Switzerland, Taiwan, Iceland, Uruguay, the United Kingdom, Spain, Norway, France, Denmark, Turkey and Germany. He won the Melodifestivalen final on 12 March 2016 with 156 points, and went on to represent Sweden in the Eurovision Song Contest, also held in Stockholm. At the age of 17, Frans became the second youngest ever Melodifestivalen winner after Carola Häggkvist, who was 16 when she won in 1983. In the Eurovision final, "If I Were Sorry" placed fifth overall.

Frans announced the Swedish jury votes as spokesperson in the final of the Eurovision Song Contest 2024 on 11 May.

== Discography ==
=== Studio albums ===
Title	Details	Peak chart positions
Title	Details	SWE
Da Man	Released: 2006; Label: Universal Music AB; Format: CD, Digital download	20
Present	Released: 24 July 2020; Label: Cardiac Records; Format: CD, digital download	—
"—" denotes a recording that did not chart or was not released in that territory.

=== Singles ===
==== As lead artist ====
Title	Year	Peak chart positions									Certifications	Album
Title	Year	SWE	AUT	BEL (FL)	FRA	GER	NLD	SPA	SWI	UK	Certifications	Album
"Kul med Jul"	2006	24	—	—	—	—	—	—	—	—		Da Man
"Fotbollsfest" (featuring Elias)	2008	1	—	—	—	—	—	—	—	—	GLF: Gold	Non-album singles
"If I Were Sorry"	2016	1	2	34	36	12	34	25	25	61	GLF: 7× Platinum; BVMI: Gold; IFPI AUT: Gold	Non-album singles
"Young Like Us"	2016	89	—	—	—	—	—	—	—	—		Non-album singles
"Liar"	2017	— (Note: "Liar" did not enter the Swedish Singles Chart (Sverigetopplistan), but peaked to number 4 on the Sweden Heatseeker Songs.)	—	—	—	—	—	—	—	—		Non-album singles
"One Floor Down"	2019	—	—	—	—	—	—	—	—	—		Non-album singles
"Snakes"	2019	—	—	—	—	—	—	—	—	—		Non-album singles
"Do It Like You Mean It" (featuring Yoel905)	2019	— (Note: "Do It Like You Mean It" did not enter the Swedish Singellista Chart, but peaked at number seven on the Swedish Heatseeker Chart.)	—	—	—	—	—	—	—	—		Non-album singles
"Amsterdam"	2019	—	—	—	—	—	—	—	—	—		Present
"Ada"	2019	—	—	—	—	—	—	—	—	—		Non-album single
"On a Wave"	2020	—	—	—	—	—	—	—	—	—		Present
"Monday"	2020	—	—	—	—	—	—	—	—	—		Present
"Mm mm mm"	2020	—	—	—	—	—	—	—	—	—		Present
"My Favourite Waste of Time"	2021	—	—	—	—	—	—	—	—	—		Non-album single
"Wasn't Meant to Be"	2024	—	—	—	—	—	—	—	—	—		Non-album single
"Don't Miss the Beat"	2024	—	—	—	—	—	—	—	—	—		Non-album single
"—" denotes a recording that did not chart or was not released in that territory.

==== As featured artist ====
Title	Year	Peak chart positions	Certifications	Album
Title	Year	SWE	Certifications	Album
"Who's da Man" (Elias featuring Frans)	2006	1	GLF: Platinum	Da Man
"Loving U" (Nicole Cross featuring Frans)	2018	—		Non-album single
"—" denotes a recording that did not chart or was not released in that territory.

Preceded by Måns Zelmerlöw	Melodifestivalen winner 2016	Succeeded by Robin Bengtsson
