= If I Were Sorry =

2016 song by Frans Jeppsson Wall

Single by Frans
- Released: 28 February 2016
- Genre: Pop; folktronica
- Length: 3:04
- Label: Cardiac Records
- Songwriters: Fredrik Andersson; Michael Saxell; Frans Jeppsson-Wall; Oscar Fogelström

Frans singles chronology
"Fotbollsfest" (2008)	"If I Were Sorry" (2016)	"Young Like Us" (2016)

Eurovision Song Contest 2016 entry
- Country: Sweden
- Artist: Frans
- Language: English
- Composers: Fredrik Andersson, Michael Saxell, Frans Jeppsson-Wall, Oscar Fogelström
- Lyricists: Fredrik Andersson, Michael Saxell, Frans Jeppsson-Wall, Oscar Fogelström

Finals performance
- Final result: 5th
- Final points: 261

Entry chronology
- ◄ "Heroes" (2015)
- "I Can't Go On" (2017) ►

"If I Were Sorry" is a song by Swedish singer Frans Jeppsson Wall. The song was released in Sweden as a digital download on 28 February 2016, and was written by Frans along with Fredrik Andersson, Michael Saxell and Oscar Fogelström. It took part in Melodifestivalen 2016, and qualified to the final from the fourth heat. It later won the final with 156 points, thus earning the right to represent Sweden in the Eurovision Song Contest 2016 in Stockholm, where it placed fifth. In the weeks after its Melodifestivalen heat appearance, the song charted in the Spotify Viral charts in Switzerland, Taiwan, Iceland, Uruguay, Czechia, the United Kingdom, Spain, the United States, Norway, France, Denmark, Turkey and Germany.

== Melodifestivalen and Eurovision ==
"If I Were Sorry" participated in the fourth heat of the 2016 Melodifestivalen, which was held on 27 February 2016 at the Gavlerinken Arena in Gävle. The song was the fifth of the seven competing entries to perform and directly qualified to the contest final as one of the two songs which received the most telephone votes. On 12 March, during the final held at the Friends Arena in Solna, Frans was the tenth of the twelve competing acts to perform, and "If I Were Sorry" won the contest with 156 votes, receiving the highest number of public votes and the second highest number of votes from the international juries.

By virtue of winning the previous year's contest and being the host country, Sweden automatically qualified to the final of the Eurovision Song Contest 2016 in Stockholm on 14 May. "If I Were Sorry" was performed in the ninth position of the 26 competing entries, and Frans subsequently finished in fifth place, receiving 261 points in total, 139 points from the public (including the maximum 12 points from Denmark and Iceland) and 122 points from the juries (including the maximum 12 points from the Czech Republic, Estonia and Finland).

== Charts ==
=== Weekly charts ===
Chart (2016)	Peak position
Austria (Ö3 Austria Top 40)	2
Belgium (Ultratop 50 Flanders)	34
Belgium (Ultratip Bubbling Under Wallonia)	15
Czech Republic Airplay (ČNS IFPI)	3
Czech Republic Singles Digital (ČNS IFPI)	57
Euro Digital Songs (Billboard)	12
Finland Download (Latauslista)	7
France (SNEP)	36
Germany (GfK)	12
Germany Airplay (BVMI)	1
Hungary (Single Top 40)	20
Iceland (RÚV)	5
Ireland (IRMA)	47
Netherlands (Single Top 100)	34
Poland (Polish Airplay Top 100)	1
Russia Airplay (Tophit)	161
Scotland Singles (OCC)	35
Slovakia Airplay (ČNS IFPI)	6
Slovakia Singles Digital (ČNS IFPI)	16
Slovenia (SloTop50)	35
Sweden (Sverigetopplistan)	1
Switzerland (Schweizer Hitparade)	25
UK Singles (OCC)	61

=== Year-end charts ===
Chart (2016)	Position
Austria (Ö3 Austria Top 40)	41
Germany (Official German Charts)	64
Poland (ZPAV)	14
Sweden (Sverigetopplistan)	11

== Certifications ==
Region	Certification	Certified units/sales
Austria (IFPI Austria)	Gold	15,000^{‡}
Germany (BVMI)	Gold	200,000^{‡}
Poland (ZPAV)	2× Platinum	40,000^{‡}
Sweden (GLF)	7× Platinum	56,000,000^{†}
^{‡} Sales+streaming figures based on certification alone.^{†} Streaming-only figures based on certification alone.

== Release history ==
Region	Date	Format	Label	Ref
Sweden	28 February 2016	Digital download	Sony Music Entertainment Sweden	
Italy	17 June 2016	Mainstream radio	Sony Music Entertainment Sweden	
