= Hovmantorp =

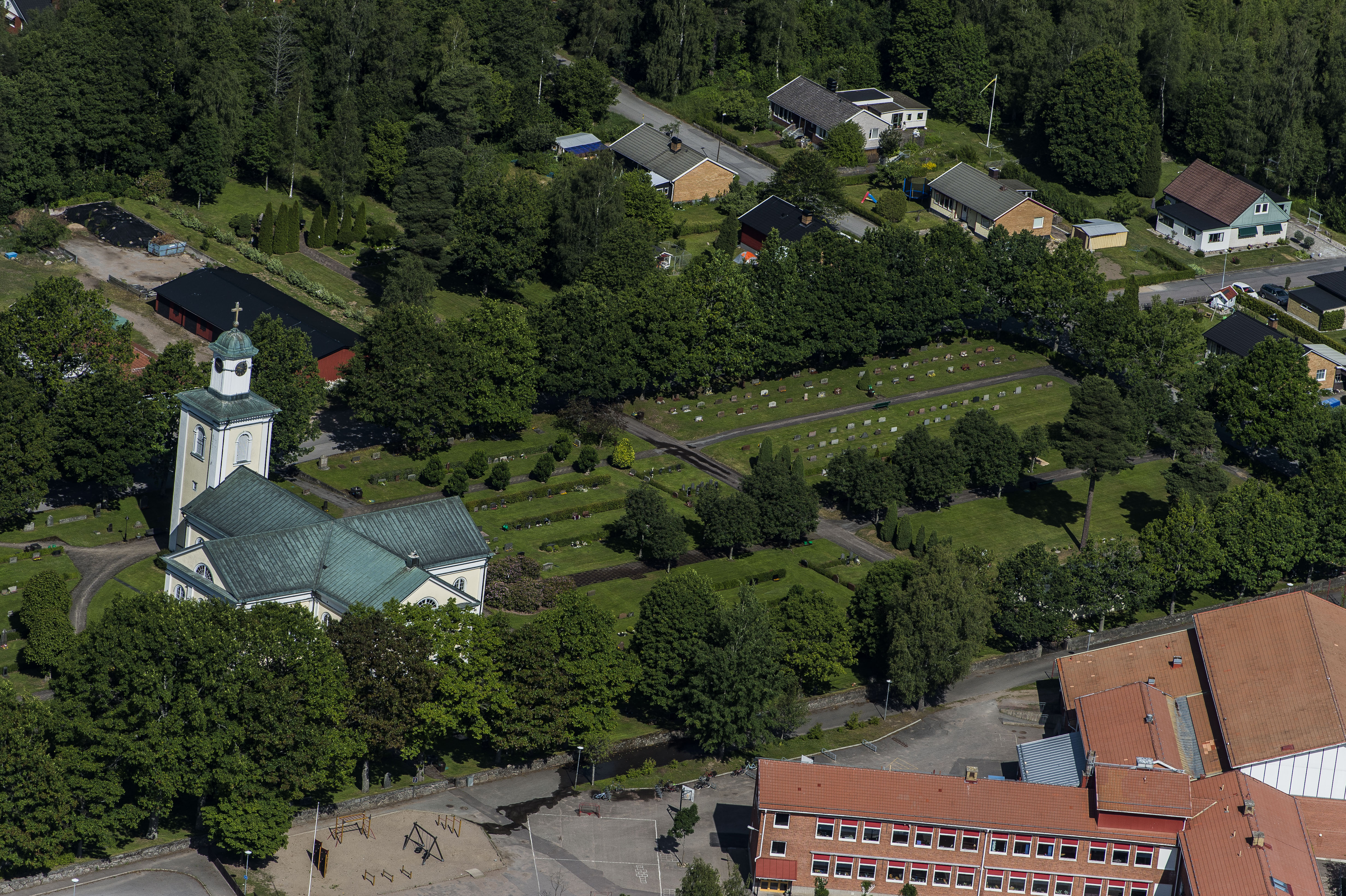
- The church in Hovmantorp.

- Location within Kronoberg Location within Sweden
- Coordinates: 56°47′N 15°08′E
- Country: Sweden
- Province: Småland
- County: Kronoberg County
- Municipality: Lessebo Municipality

Area
  - Total: 2.56 km^{2} (0.99 sq mi)

Population (31 December 2010)
  - Total: 3,001
  - Density: 1,170/km^{2} (3,000/sq mi)
- Time zone: UTC+1 (CET)
  - Summer (DST): UTC+2 (CEST)

Hovmantorp (Swedish pronunciation: [ˈhôːvmanˌtɔrp]) is the largest locality in Lessebo Municipality, Kronoberg County, Sweden, with 2,991 inhabitants in 2010. However, Hovmantorp is not the municipal seat, which is Lessebo.

== Notable people from Hovmantorp ==
- Charlotte Perrelli
- Truls Möregårdh
