= Fotbollsfest =

Single by Frans featuring Elias
- Released: April 2008
- Recorded: 2008
- Genre: Pop; Reggae
- Label: Cardiac
- Songwriters: Fredrik Andersson; Ingvar Irhagen; Christoffer Olssoon; Jens Magnusson

Frans singles chronology
"Kul med Jul" (2006)	"Fotbollsfest" (2008)	"If I Were Sorry" (2016)

Elias singles chronology
"Who's da Man" (2006)	"Fotbollsfest" (2008)

Music video
- "Fotbollsfest" on YouTube

"Fotbollsfest" is Swedish soccer/football song written by Fredrik Andersson, Ingvar Irhagen, Christoffer Olssoon and Jens Magnusson, and recorded by Frans featuring Elias in support of the Team Sweden for the 2008 UEFA European Football Championship in Austria and Switzerland. The song is a follow-up hit to "Who's da Man" by Elias featuring Frans that was the biggest summer hit of 2006 in Sweden and was a tribute to the soccer player Zlatan Ibrahimović.

== Track listing ==
Digital download - EP
No.	Title	Length
1.	"Fotbollsfest"	3:36
2.	"Maybe"	3:42
3.	"Fotbollsfest" (Lederhosen Remix)	3:17
4.	"Fotbollsfest" (Club Remix)	3:40

== Charts ==
=== Weekly charts ===
Chart (2008)	Peak position
Sweden (Sverigetopplistan)	1

=== Year-end charts ===
Chart (2008)	Position
Sweden (Sverigetopplistan)	43

=== Certifications ===
Region	Certification	Certified units/sales
Sweden (GLF)	Gold	10,000^{^}
^{^} Shipments figures based on certification alone.

== Release history ==
Region	Date	Format	Label
Sweden	April 2008	Digital download	Cardiac
