= Gone Too Long =

Studio album by Charlotte Perrelli
- Released: 30 June 2004
- Length: 41:00
- Label: Stockhouse

Charlotte Perrelli chronology
Miss Jealousy (2001)	Gone Too Long (2004)	I din röst (2006)

Gone too Long is the third studio album by Swedish singer Charlotte Perrelli, released on 30 June 2004. It peaked at number 11 on the Swedish Albums Chart. The song "Long Way Home" was written by British pop group Steps, before their 2001 split.

== Track listing ==
Gone Too Long track listing
No.	Title	Writer(s)	Producer(s)	Length
1.	"Gone Too Long"	Jörgen Elofsson	Peter Boström	2:54
2.	"Million Miles Away"	Johan Fransson; Niklas Edberger; Tim Larsson; Tobias Lundgren	Hurricane Production	3:19
3.	"What a Feeling"	Giorgio Moroder; Irene Cara; Keith Forsey	Boström	3:29
4.	"Believe in Love Again"	Fransson; Edberger; Larsson; Lundgren	Hurricane Produktion	3:50
5.	"Long Way Home"	Douglas Carr; Pär Lönn; Steps	Carr	3:33
6.	"Wrapped Around"	Cervin; Johan Stentorp	Stentorp	3:37
7.	"All By Myself"	Andreas Matsson; Joacim Persson; Niclas Molinder; Pelle Ankarberg	Persson; Molinder; Ankarberg	3:05
8.	"Where Were You"	Fransson; Edberger; Larsson; Lundgren	Hurricane Production	4:12
9.	"Wandering Light"	Dan Atterdud; Jörgen Ringqvist; Rune Gardell	Ringqvist	3:03
10.	"Tell Me"	Persson; Molinder; Ankarberg	Persson; Molinder; Ankarberg	3:55
11.	"Closer"	Fanny Bjurström; Persson; Molinder; Ankarberg	Persson; Molinder; Ankarberg	3:26
12.	"Broken Heart"	Thomas G:son	Thomas G:son	2:51

== Charts ==
Weekly chart performance for Gone Too Long
Chart (2004)	Peak position
Swedish Albums (Sverigetopplistan)	11
