= När en flicka talar skånska =

"När en flicka talar skånska."

Single by Danne Stråhed

from the album Drängavisan
- Released: 1993
- Genre: Folk
- Songwriter: Michael Saxell

"När en flicka talar skånska" (When a girl speaks Scanian) is a southern Swedish song written by the Ystad singer-songwriter Michael Saxell and was made famous by the singer Danne Stråhed, who released it as a single in 1993. In 1993, it was recorded by Wizex on the album Vår hemmagjorda dansmusik.

== Other recordings ==
- Exportz orkester in 1997.
- Agaton Band in 2004.
- Michael Saxell in 2008 with Jalle Lorensson.
