= Elias (band) =

Swedish rock band

- Origin: Sweden
- Genres: reggae
- Years active: 2004–

Elias is a Swedish rock band formed in 2004-2005 and consisting of Fredrik Andersson, Pascal Bjerrehus, Jens Magnusson and Christoffer Olsson. They were signed to various record labels, including Pama Records, Rivendale Records and Universal Music.

Shine, their debut album, released in June 2006 and produced by Peps Persson, followed their initial 2005 hit single "Sayonara". However it was "Who's da Man", featuring 7-year-old singer Frans Jeppsson-Wall, that catapulted the band to great fame when the song became the biggest summer hit of 2006 in Sweden. They also produced the record. They repeated the accomplishment with "Fotbollsfest", another collaboration with Frans, that again reached #1 in Sweden.

== Discography ==
=== Albums ===
- 2006: Shine

=== Singles ===
- 2005: "Sayonara"
- 2006: "Who's da Man" (Elias feat. Frans) (Stayed at #1 for 10 weeks)
- 2008: "Fotbollsfest" (Frans feat. Elias) (reached #1 in the Swedish Singles Chart)

Non-charting Elias singles include "Bye Bye", "Crying", "Frozen Universe", "I'm Gone".

"New York Reggae Day" with Elias feat. Frans is included in the maxi-CD to "Who's da Man"
