= I din röst =

Studio album by Charlotte Perrelli
- Released: 5 July 2006
- Genre: Pop
- Label: Stockhouse

Charlotte Perrelli chronology
Gone Too Long (2004)	I din röst (2006)	Hero (2008)

I din röst (In your voice) is the fourth studio album by the Swedish singer Charlotte Perrelli, released on 5 July 2006. It peaked at 29th place on the Swedish music charts. It is a tribute album to Monica Zetterlund. Most of the tracks are Zetterlund covers, but also features some original tracks from Charlotte Perrelli.

== Track listing ==
1. I din röst
2. Trubbel
3. Gröna små äpplen (Little Green Apples)
4. Mister Kelly
5. Monicas vals
6. Elinor Rydholm
7. När min vän
8. Sakta vi gå genom stan (Walkin' My Baby Back Home)
9. Nu är det gott att leva
10. Nu har jag fått den jag vill ha
11. När Charlie är född
12. Tillägnan

== Charts ==
Chart (2006)	Peak position
Sweden (Sverigetopplistan)	29
