= Som om himlen brann =

Single by Lizette Pålsson & Bizazz
- A-side: "Som om himlen brann"
- B-side: "I Always Fall in Love With You"
- Released: 1992
- Genre: schlager
- Label: Eagle
- Songwriters: Jane Larsson (lyrics); Leif Larsson (music)

"Som om himlen brann" is a song performed by Lizette Pålsson & Bizazz in Melodifestivalen 1992, finishing in second place. The song charted at Svensktoppen for five weeks between 19 April – 17 May 1992, peaking at No. 4.
