= Min barndoms jul (Charlotte Perrelli album) =

Studio album by Charlotte Perrelli
- Released: 20 November 2013
- Genre: Christmas
- Label: Stockhouse

Charlotte Perrelli chronology
| The Girl (2012) | Min barndoms jul (2013) | Mitt liv (2017) |

Min barndoms jul is the seventh studio album by Swedish singer Charlotte Perrelli, released on 20 November 2013. Perelli's sons Angelo and Alessio contribute to the album along with a choir consisting of 60 children.

== Track listing ==
1. En barndomsjul
2. Bjällerklang (Jingle Bells)
3. Mössens julafton (Musevisa)
4. Nu tändas tusen juleljus
5. Hej mitt vinterland (solo by Angelo & Alessio)
6. Nu står jul vid snöig port
7. Jag såg mamma kyssa tomten (I Saw Mommy Kissing Santa Claus) (solo by Angelo)
8. När juldagsmorgon glimmar
9. Rudolf med röda mulen (Rudolph the Red-Nosed Reindeer)
10. Jul, jul, strålande jul
11. När det lider mot jul
12. Nu är julen här igen
13. Sista dagarna före jul
14. Julgransplundring (bonus track)

== Charts ==
| Chart (2013) | Peak position |
|---|---|
| Sweden (Sverigetopplistan) | 49 |
