= Tusen och en natt (album) =

Studio album by Wizex
- Released: March 1999
- Genre: Dansband music
- Length: 42 minutes
- Label: Mariann
- Producer: Mikael Wendth

Wizex chronology
Mot nya mål (1998)	Tusen och en natt (1999)	Om du var här (2000)

Tusen och en natt is a 1999 album from Swedish dansband Wizex. The album included Charlotte Nilsson's hit "Tusen och en natt/Take Me to Your Heaven", and the album sold 235,000 copies. The album peaked at #16 at the Swedish album chart.

== Track listing ==
1. Tusen och en natt
2. Blå, blå är kärleken
3. Ett brev du aldrig får
4. En del av mig
5. Ingenting är bättre
6. Rena rama vilda västern
7. Hem genom stan
8. Vem följer med vem
9. Var är du nu?
10. Mer än hela dig
11. Om du var min
12. Gör min himmel blå
13. Macherita
14. Min morgon efter regn
15. Take Me to Your Heaven

== Charts ==
Chart (1999)	Peak position
Sweden (Sverigetopplistan)	16
