= Jag kan se en ängel (song) =

Single by Wizex

from the album Jag kan se en ängel
- A-side: "Jag kan se en ängel"
- B-side: "Det faller ett regn"
- Released: 1992
- Genre: dansband music, jazz
- Label: KM
- Songwriter(s): Johnny Thunqvist, Kaj Svenling

Wizex singles chronology
| "Juletid/Jul i vinterland" (1991) | "Jag kan se en ängel" (1992) | "Jag måste nå min en ängel" (1992) |

"Jag kan se en ängel" is a jazz-inspired dansband song written by Johnny Thunqvist and Kaj Svenling. It was one of the entries for Melodifestivalen 1992, where it was performed by Lena Pålsson, back then singer of Wizex. The song started as number 10 out for the evening, and was knocked out in the first round. However, the song charted at Svensktoppen for two weeks between 19–26 April 1992, with positions 9-10. It was also released as a single in 1992.
