= Do It Like You Mean It =

Single by Frans featuring Yoel 905
- Released: 24 May 2019
- Recorded: 2018
- Genre: Pop
- Length: 2:47
- Label: Cardiac Records
- Songwriter(s): Dani Klein; Fredrik Andersson; Dirk Schoufs; Una Balfe; Michael Saxell; Frans Jeppsson Wall; Yoel 905
- Producer(s): Fredrik Andersson

Frans singles chronology
"Snakes" (2019)	"Do It Like You Mean It" (2019)	"Amsterdam" (2019)

"Do It Like You Mean It" is a song by Swedish singer Frans featuring Yoel 905. It was released as a digital download in Sweden on 24 May 2019 through Cardiac Records. The song was written by Dani Klein, Fredrik Andersson, Dirk Schoufs, Una Balfe, Michael Saxell, Frans Jeppsson Wall and Yoel 905. The song did not enter the Swedish Singles Chart, but peaked at number seven on the Swedish Heatseeker Chart.

== Music video ==
A music video to accompany the release of "Do It Like You Mean It" was first released onto YouTube on 10 July 2019 at a total length of two minutes and forty-eight seconds.

== Track listing ==
Digital download
No.	Title	Length
1.	"Do It Like You Mean It" (feat. Yoel905)	2:47

== Charts ==
Chart (2019)	Peak position
Poland (Polish Airplay Top 100)	51
Swedish Heatseeker Chart (Sverigetopplistan)	7

== Release date ==
Region	Date	Format	Label
Sweden	24 May 2019	Digital download; streaming	Cardiac Records
