= Kul med jul =

Single by Frans

from the album Da Man
- Released: 4 December 2006
- Recorded: 2006
- Genre: Pop
- Length: 3:23
- Label: Cardiac Records

Frans singles chronology
"Who's da Man" (2006)	"Kul med jul" (2006)	"Fotbollsfest" (2008)

"Kul med jul" is a song by Swedish singer Frans. It was released as a digital download in Sweden on 4 December 2006 through Cardiac Records. The song is included on his debut studio album Da Man (2006). The song has peaked to number 6 on the Swedish Singles Chart.

== Track listing ==
Digital download
No.	Title	Length
1.	"Kul med jul"	3:23

== Chart performance ==
=== Weekly charts ===
Chart (2006)	Peak position
Sweden (Sverigetopplistan)	6

== Release date ==
Region	Date	Format	Label
Sweden	4 December 2006	Digital download	Cardiac Records
