= Hero (Charlotte Perrelli album) =

- Album cover

Studio album by Charlotte Perrelli
- Released: 23 April 2008
- Recorded: 2007–2008
- Genre: Pop
- Length: 37:03
- Language: English
- Label: Universal Music

Charlotte Perrelli chronology
I din röst (2006)	Hero (2008)	Rimfrostjul (2008)

Hero is the fifth studio album by Swedish singer Charlotte Perrelli, released on 23 April 2008. The album includes the song "Hero" which was Sweden's entry in the Eurovision Song Contest 2008. The album also includes the radio single "Addicted" and the digital single "Bullet". The song "Appreciate" was originally recorded by Nick Jonas for his 2004 album Nicholas Jonas and is written by former Busted star James Bourne.

== Track listing ==
No.	Title	Writer(s)	Producer(s)	Length
1.	"Bullet"	Dan Sundquist, Fredrik Kempe, Peter Hägerås	Peter Boström	3:41
2.	"Hero"	Bobby Ljunggren, Fredrik Kempe	Boström	2:55
3.	"Addicted"	Johan Fransson, Tim Larsson, Tobias Lundgren	Fransson, Larsson, Lundgren	4:00
4.	"Remedy"	Emilia, Jan Kask, Peter Månsson	Månsson	3:57
5.	"Show Me a Mountain"	Anders Henjer, Fredrik Kempe	Sundquist	3:43
6.	"Appreciate"	Jake Schulze, James Bourne, Savan Kotecha	Schulze	3:11
7.	"Holy Man"	Dan Sundquist, Fredrik Kempe, Peter Hägerås	Sundquist	3:03
8.	"A Lot Like Love"	Dana Calitri, Nina Ossoff, Tommy Tysper	Boström	3:49
9.	"Not Alone"	Jeanette Olsson, Niclas Kings, Niklas Bergwall	Kings, Bergwall	3:06
10.	"Slowly"	Fredrik Kempe, Henrik Wikström	Wikström	3:32
11.	"Black & Blue"	Fredrik Kempe	Sundquist	4:06

== Release history ==
The album was released both digitally and physically on 23 April 2008.

Region	Date	Label	Format	Version
Sweden	23 April 2008	Universal Music	CD	Original
Sweden	23 April 2008	Universal Music	Digital download	Original
United States	18 September 2008			

== Charts ==
=== Weekly charts ===
Chart (2008)	Peak position
Swedish Albums (Sverigetopplistan)	3

=== Year-end charts ===
Chart (2008)	Position
Swedish Albums (Sverigetopplistan)	70
