= Miss Decibel =

1978 album by Wizex

Studio album by Wizex
- Released: March 1978
- Studio: KMH Studios
- Genre: Dansband
- Label: Mariann
- Producer: Bert Karlsson, Lars Holm

Wizex chronology
Som en sång (1977)	Miss Decibel (1978)	Carousel (1978)

Miss Decibel is a 1978 studio album from Swedish "dansband" Wizex. The album contained the song "Miss Decibel", which was listed on Svensktoppen, along with the song "Om en stund". The album reached number two on the Swedish Albums Chart.

== Track listing ==
=== Side A ===
#	Title	Songwriter	Length
1.	"When You Walk in the Room"	Jackie DeShannon	2.24
2.	"Ge mig dina tankar (Torn Between Two Lovers)"	Peter Yarrow, Phillip Jarrell	3.13
3.	""Don't Stop"	Christine McVie	2.41
4.	""Joddlarkärlek (Cowboy Yodel Song)"	Carson Robison, Åke Strömmer	2.09
5.	""Arms of Mary"	Iain Sutherland	3.21
6.	""My Broken Souvenirs"	Werner Theunissen	3.45
7.	""En vän för alltid (I Love How You Love Me)"	Larry Kolber, Barry Mann, Monica Forsberg	2.43

=== Side B ===
#	Title	Songwriter	Length
8.	"Save Me"	Guy Fletcher, Doug Flett	3.05
9.	"C'est si bon"	Lasse Holm, Gert Lengstrand	3.34
10.	"Splish Splash"	Bobby Darin, Jean Murray	2.05
11.	"Om en stund"	Lars Hagelin, Tommy Stjernfeldt, Monica Forsberg	3.22
12.	"Tennessee Waltz"	Pee Wee King, Redd Stewart	2.33
13.	"Avsked i gryningen"	Lars Hagelin, Tommy Stjernfeldt, A. Wedin	3.04
14.	"Miss Decibel" (with Lasse Holm)	Lasse Holm, Gert Lengstrand	3.42

== Contributing ==
- Kikki Danielsson - vocals
- Tommy Stjernfeldt - vocals, guitar
- Lars Hagelin - vocals, piano, synthesizer
- Mats Nilsson - bass guitar
- Thommy Carlsson - vocals, guitar, saxophone
- Jerker Nilsson - drums

== Charts ==
Chart (1978)	Peak position
Swedish Albums (Sverigetopplistan)	2
