= Charlotte (album) =

Studio album by Charlotte Nilsson
- Released: October 10, 1999
- Genre: Pop
- Length: 45:00
- Label: Stockhouse Records

Charlotte Nilsson chronology
Charlotte (1999)	Miss Jealousy (2001)

Professional ratings
Review scores
Source	Rating
Allmusic	3.5/5 stars

Charlotte is the debut solo studio album by the Swedish singer Charlotte Nilsson, released in 1999 as her debut album as a solo artist. In Korea, Charlotte was released as a 2 disc special with CD 2 being all the songs from the "Miss Jealousy" album.

== Track listing ==
1. "Yester Playground" (Jelse, Andersson) – 3:43
2. "Shooting Star" (Jelse, Andersson) – 3:34
3. "Damn You" (Jelse, Andersson) – 4:06
4. "I Write You a Love Song" (Evenrude) – 3:44
5. "Fairys Flying" (Jelse, Thelenius, Andersson) – 3:41
6. "All I Want is You" (Evenrude) – 3:37
7. "Take Me to Your Heaven" (Lengstrand, Diedricson) – 3:04
8. "Can You Hold Me Tonight" (Jelse, Andersson) – 3:02
9. "If Lovin' You is Wrong" (Evenrude) – 4:40
10. "Flower in My Garden" (Jelse, Thelenius, Andersson) –
11. "Heal Me" (Jelse, Andersson) – 4:40
12. "Something" (Jelse, Andersson) – 3:34
13. "Don't Wanna Let Go" - Japan bonus track
14. "Damn You" (Remix) - Japan bonus track
