= Christer Björkman =

Swedish singer and television producer

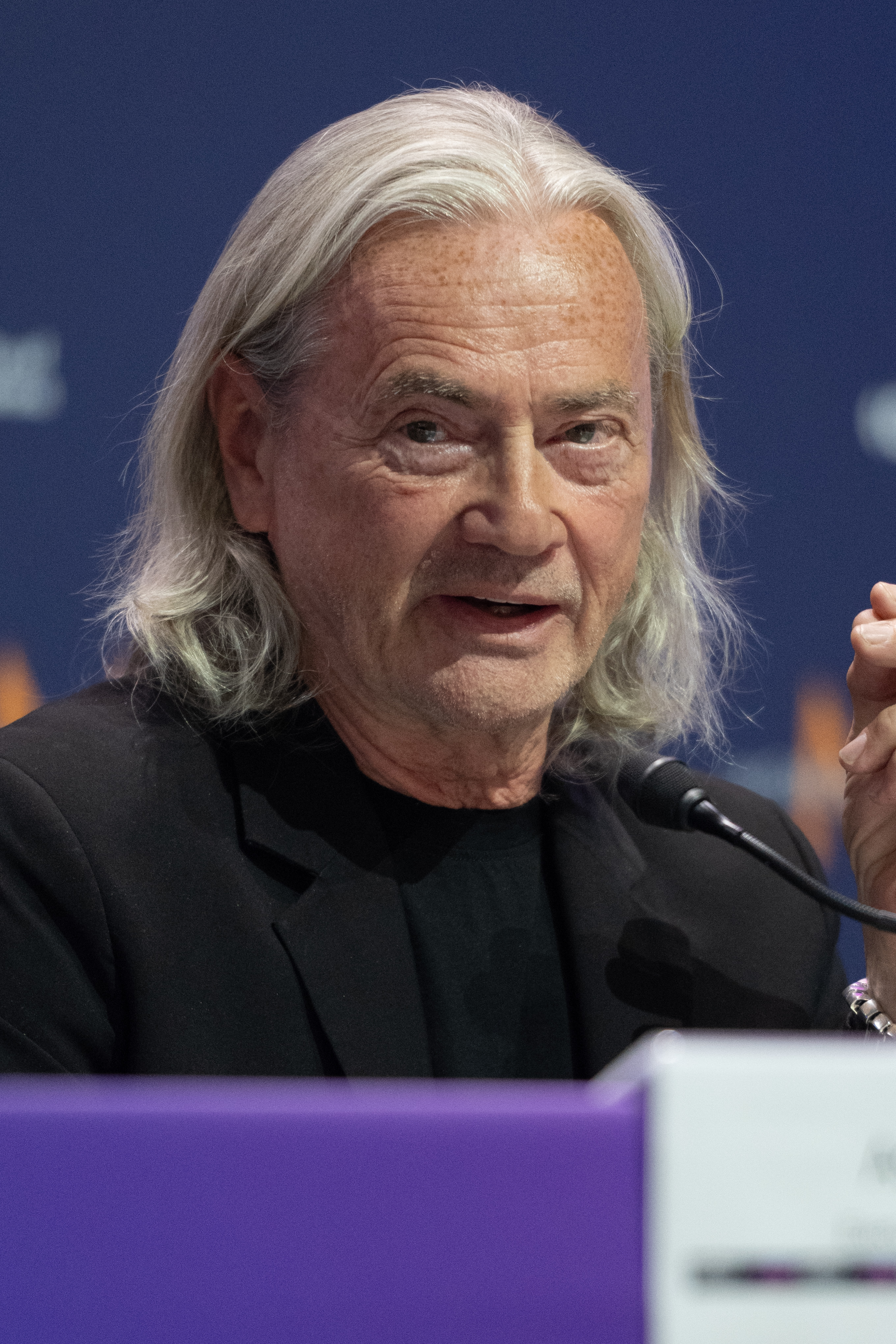
- Björkman in 2026

Background information
- Born: Christer Samuel Björkman; 25 August 1957 (age 69); Borås, Sweden
- Genre: Schlager
- Occupations: Singer; television producer
- Years active: 1984–present

Christer Samuel Björkman (Swedish pronunciation: [ˈkrɪ̌sːtɛr ˈbjœ̌rkman]; born 25 August 1957) is a Swedish singer and television producer. He represented Sweden in the Eurovision Song Contest 1992 with the song "I morgon är en annan dag". From 2002 to 2021, he served as a competition producer of Melodifestivalen, and has remained an important figure in the production of Melodifestivalen and the Eurovision Song Contest. He stepped down from this position after Melodifestivalen 2021, and is currently working at Voxovation, a Los Angeles-based company that focuses on expanding the Eurovision Song Contest brand into other markets.

== Biography ==
Björkman was born in Borås as the son of gaming entrepreneur Ulla Björkman (1939-2025). He never met his father while he was alive. He began working as a hairdresser, and soon had his own hair salon in Borås.

In 1985, Björkman started his entertainment career by recording a song called "Våga och vinn", which was produced by Bruno Glenmark.

Björkman won Melodifestivalen 1992 with "I morgon är en annan dag", and represented Sweden at the Eurovision Song Contest 1992. He finished second last, Sweden's worst result at the contest since 1977. He entered Melodifestivalen a second and third time in 1993 with "Välkommen till livet" and 1999 with a song called "Välkommen hem" which finished last among the ten participants.

Alongside Richard Herrey, Björkman founded the Marcel Bezençon Awards in 2002.

From 2002 to 2021, Björkman held the positions of contest producer of Melodifestivalen and Sweden's head of delegation at the Eurovision Song Contest. During his last year as producer in 2021, he also hosted all of the shows.

Björkman was the show producer of the Eurovision Song Contest 2013 in Malmö, following Loreen's victory the year prior. He has acted as a juror at the national selections of other countries, and served as contest producer of the Eurovision Song Contest 2016 in Stockholm following Måns Zelmerlöw's victory the year prior, as well as the 2017, 2018 and 2019 contests. As such, he was responsible for putting the delegations' ideas for the staging of their acts into effect and for determining the running order of the shows. He returned to the Eurovision Song Contest as contest producer in 2024, when the event was held in Malmö, following Loreen's second win the year prior, and again assumed the role for the 2025 contest. He was succeeded in this role by Marvin Dietmann in 2026.

Together with Edward af Sillén, Björkman served as the Swedish commentator for the Eurovision Song Contest 2021.

Björkman served as juror in many national selections for the Eurovision Song Contest and its spin-offs. In 2016, Björkman was chosen to be one of three expert jurors at the Junior Eurovision Song Contest 2016 in Valletta, Malta. In 2018, he was invited as an international juror for Sweden at Destination Eurovision 2018, the French national selection for that year's contest. In 2019, he served as a member of the juries at Eurovision – Australia Decides and Albania's Festivali i Këngës 58. In 2024, he served as judge at the Luxembourg Song Contest. In 2026, he took this position in the German preselection Eurovision Song Contest – Das deutsche Finale 2026.

Björkman was also one of the producers of the American Song Contest in 2022, and of the Eurovision Song Contest Asia in 2026.

== Personal life ==
Björkman is openly gay, and is married to Martin Kagemark.

Awards and achievements
Preceded by Carola with "Fångad av en stormvind"	Sweden in the Eurovision Song Contest; 1992	Succeeded by Arvingarna with "Eloise"
