= Miss Jealousy =

Studio album by Charlotte Nilsson
- Released: 5 April 2001
- Genre: Pop
- Length: 40:15
- Label: Stockhouse Records

Charlotte Nilsson chronology
Charlotte (1999)	Miss Jealousy (2001)	Gone Too Long (2004)

Miss Jealousy is the second studio album by Swedish singer Charlotte Nilsson, released in 2001.

== Track listing ==
1. You Got Me Going Crazy
2. Miss Jealousy
3. Game Over, You Win
4. I'm the One for You
5. Light of My Life
6. One Kiss Away
7. Ain't No Mountain
8. I Can Tell
9. Baby It's You
10. Crying in the Rain
11. Don't Wanna Let Go
12. Don't Give Me up

== Charts ==
Chart (2001)	Peak position
Sweden (Sverigetopplistan)	32
