= Schlagers på väg =

Studio album by Wizex
- Released: October 22, 2014
- Genre: dansband music, schlager
- Label: Atenzia

Wizex chronology
40 år i folkparkens tjänst (2013)	Schlagers på väg (2014)

Schlagers på väg is a 2014 Wizex studio album.

== Track listing ==
1. I folkparkens tjänst
2. Alla har glömt
3. Så här börjar kärlek
4. Sol och vår
5. Solen lyser även på liten stuga
6. Swing it magistern
7. April, april
8. Jag ska sjunga för dig
9. Om tårar vore guld
10. På söndag (with Ronja Lindberg)
11. Jag måste ge mig av
12. Kvällens sista dans
13. Siwan medley

== Charts ==
Chart (2014)	Peak position
Swedish Albums (Sverigetopplistan)	32
