= Om himlen och Österlen =

Song
- Language: Swedish
- Songwriter: Michael Saxell

"Om himlen och Österlen" (Swedish for: About Heaven and Österlen) is a popular song composed by Scanian Swedish singer-songwriter Michael Saxell from Ystad in 1991. The lyrics are largely autobiographical; the story of a man who moved to North America from the Österlen region in southeastern Scania at a young age and returned to his homeland later in life. Michael Saxell lived in Vancouver, British Columbia in Canada from 1975 to 1991.

Michael Saxell wrote the song in the early 1990s and it has since been recorded by many Swedish artists including, Jan Malmsjö, Östen Warnerbring, Lasse Stefanz, Danne Stråhed and Wizex as well as by the songwriter himself.

The song has been described as the new Scanian anthem by Swedish music journalist Christer Olsson.
