= Rimfrostjul =

Studio album by Charlotte Perrelli
- Released: 10 November 2008 (Sweden)
- Genre: Christmas
- Label: Naxos

Charlotte Perrelli chronology
Hero (2008)	Rimfrostjul (2008)	The Girl (2012)

Rimfrostjul is a Christmas music album by the Swedish singer Charlotte Perrelli released on 10 November 2008. The album includes the Malmö Symphony Orchestra and the Lund Student Singers.

== Track listing ==
1. Rimfrostsjul (The Christmas Song)
2. Snöa på, snöa på (Let It Snow)
3. O helga natt (Cantique de noël)
4. Hur kan man leda en kung (Who Would Imagine a King)
5. Mitt hjärta slår för dig (Little Drummer Boy)
6. Ave Maria
7. Mitt önskebrev till dig (Grown Up Christmas List)
8. En släde för två (Sleigh Ride)
9. Dagen är kommen (Adeste Fideles)
10. Känner din värme (Maybe This Christmas)
11. Låt julen förkunna (Happy Xmas (War Is Over))

== Charts ==
=== Weekly charts ===
Chart (2008)	Peak position
Swedish Albums (Sverigetopplistan)	12

=== Year-end charts ===
Chart (2008)	Position
Swedish Albums (Sverigetopplistan)	71
