= The Girl (album) =

Studio album by Charlotte Perrelli
- Released: 14 March 2012
- Genre: Pop; Dance; House
- Label: Universal Music

Charlotte Perrelli chronology
Rimfrostjul (2008)	The Girl (2012)	Min barndoms jul (2013)

The Girl is the sixth studio album by Swedish singer Charlotte Perrelli, released on 14 March 2012. The first single was Perrelli's contribution to Melodifestivalen 2012, "The Girl".

The week before the album was due to be released, Perrelli wrote on her blog "It's always great fun to release a new album, to get to work with songwriters / producers and to create is a good thing and I hope I get the opportunity to [do this] for the rest of my life. I love my work. I have now worked out a new style and a new sound with a bunch of awesome people, I'm happy with the result and hope you will like this [new album] as much as I do."

== Track listing ==
1. "The Girl"
2. "Little Braveheart" (feat. Kate Ryan)
3. "Just Not Tonight"
4. "In The Sun"
5. "Dark to the Light"
6. "Closing Circles"
7. "No More Black & Blue"
8. "Any Love That Is Love"

== Charts, certifications and sales ==
The album debuted at number 7 on the Swedish Album Charts, spending more than half a month inside Sweden's Top 20 albums chart.

Chart Run: 7-17-45

Chart	Country	Provider(s)	Peak position	Certification	Sales/shipments
Swedish Albums Chart	Sweden	IFPI	7	-	+10,000
