= Sweden in the Eurovision Song Contest 1992 =

- Eurovision Song Contest 1992
- Participating broadcaster: Sveriges Television (SVT)
- Country: Sweden
- Selection process: Melodifestivalen 1992
- Selection date: 14 March 1992

Competing entry
- Song: "I morgon är en annan dag"
- Artist: Christer Björkman
- Songwriter: Niklas Strömstedt

Placement
- Final result: 22nd, 9 points

Participation chronology

Sweden was represented at the Eurovision Song Contest 1992 with the song "I morgon är en annan dag", written by Niklas Strömstedt, and performed by Christer Björkman. The Swedish participating broadcaster, Sveriges Television (SVT), selected its entry through Melodifestivalen 1992. In addition, SVT was also the host broadcaster and staged the event at the Malmö Isstadion in Malmö, after winning the previous edition with the song "Fångad av en stormvind" by Carola.

== Before Eurovision ==
=== Melodifestivalen 1992 ===
Melodifestivalen 1992 was the selection for the 32nd song to represent Sweden at the Eurovision Song Contest. It was the 31st time that this system of picking a song had been used. 1,544 songs were submitted to Sveriges Television (SVT) for the competition. The final was held in the Cirkus in Stockholm on 14 March 1992, presented by Adde Malmberg and Claes Malmberg and broadcast on Kanal 1 and Sveriges Radio's P3 network. The show was watched by 5,376,000 people.

First Round – 14 March 1992
R/O	Artist	Song	Songwriter(s)	Result
1	Angel	"Venus Butterfly"	Bert Karlsson, Lennart Clerwall	—N/a
2	Thérèse Löf	"Ingenting går som man vill"	Peter Grönvall, Nanne Nordqvist	—N/a
3	Christer Björkman	"I morgon är en annan dag"	Niklas Strömstedt	Advanced
4	Anna Nederdal	"Ingen annan än du"	John Ekedahl, Tommy Kaså	—N/a
5	Lizette Pålsson and Bizazz	"Som om himlen brann"	Jane Larsson, Leif Larsson	Advanced
6	Shanes	"Upp, flyger vi, upp"	Björn Ander Andersson	—N/a
7	Py Bäckman	"Långt härifrån"	Py Bäckman, Anders Olausson	Advanced
8	Maria Rådsten	"Vad som än händer"	Ulf Söderberg, Peter Grönvall, Nanne Nordqvist	Advanced
9	Kikki Danielsson	"En enda gång"	Hans Skoog, Martin Klaman	Advanced
10	Lena Pålsson and Wizex	"Jag kan se en ängel"	Kaj Svenling, Johnny Thunqvist	—N/a

Second Round – 14 March 1992
R/O	Artist	Song	Points	Place
1	Christer Björkman	"I morgon är en annan dag"	64	1
2	Lizette Pålsson and Bizazz	"Som om himlen brann"	59	2
3	Py Bäckman	"Långt härifrån"	33	5
4	Maria Rådsten	"Vad som än händer"	41	3
5	Kikki Danielsson	"En enda gång"	34	4

Detailed Regional Jury Voting
R/O	Song	Luleå	Umeå	Sundsvall	Falun	Örebro	Karlstad	Gothenburg	Malmö	Växjö	Norrköping	Stockholm	Total
1	"I morgon är en annan dag"	4	4	4	6	6	6	8	6	8	6	6	64
2	"Som om himlen brann"	1	8	8	2	8	4	4	8	4	4	8	59
3	"Långt härifrån"	2	1	1	4	1	1	6	2	6	8	1	33
4	"Vad som än händer"	6	6	2	1	4	8	2	4	2	2	4	41
5	"En enda gång"	8	2	6	8	2	2	1	1	1	1	2	34

== At Eurovision ==
Björkman sang 7th on the night of the contest, following France and preceding Portugal. "I morgon är en annan dag" received 9 points and placed 22nd of 23 countries. Christer Björkman's result at Eurovision was Sweden's worst since 1977, until 2003 the worst result of a Eurovision host country.

=== Voting ===
Points awarded to Sweden
Score	Country
12 points	
10 points	
8 points	
7 points	
6 points	
5 points	
4 points	Denmark; Yugoslavia
3 points	
2 points	
1 point	France

Points awarded by Sweden
Score	Country
12 points	Malta
10 points	Ireland
8 points	Italy
7 points	Denmark
6 points	Iceland
5 points	United Kingdom
4 points	Israel
3 points	Greece
2 points	Norway
1 point	Austria
