= Hero (Charlotte Perrelli song) =

2008 song by Charlotte Perrelli

Single by Charlotte Perrelli

from the album Hero
- A-side: "Hero"
- B-side: "Hero (Instrumental)"
- Released: February 2008
- Recorded: 2007
- Genre: Europop; disco
- Length: 2:56
- Label: Universal Music
- Songwriters: Bobby Ljunggren; Fredrik Kempe

Charlotte Perrelli singles chronology
"Jag är tillbaka" (2007)	"Hero" (2008)

Eurovision Song Contest 2008 entry
- Country: Sweden
- Artist: Charlotte Perrelli
- Language: English
- Composers: Bobby Ljunggren; Fredrik Kempe
- Lyricist: Fredrik Kempe

Finals performance
- Semi-final result: 12th (back-up jury)
- Semi-final points: 54
- Final result: 18th
- Final points: 47

Entry chronology
- ◄ "The Worrying Kind" (2007)
- "La voix" (2009) ►

"Hero" is a 2008 pop song performed by the Swedish singer Charlotte Perrelli, written by Fredrik Kempe and Bobby Ljunggren. It was entered into the Melodifestivalen 2008, winning at the Globen arena on 15 March 2008. Due to this, it represented Sweden at the Eurovision Song Contest 2008.

The single "Hero" was released on 12 March 2008. It topped the Swedish Singles chart, and was certified Gold, in recognition of 10,000 copies sold. After the contest, it was certified Platinum, as 40,000 copies sold. The song entered the 3rd place at Svensktoppen on 13 April 2008, and it stayed on the chart for eight weeks until 1 June 2008 peaking at #3. The Swedish single top 100, she peaked at #1 for 5 weeks, and left the charts after 19 weeks. Her position in the 'best of all time' is #503 with 769 points.

== Melodifestivalen and Eurovision ==
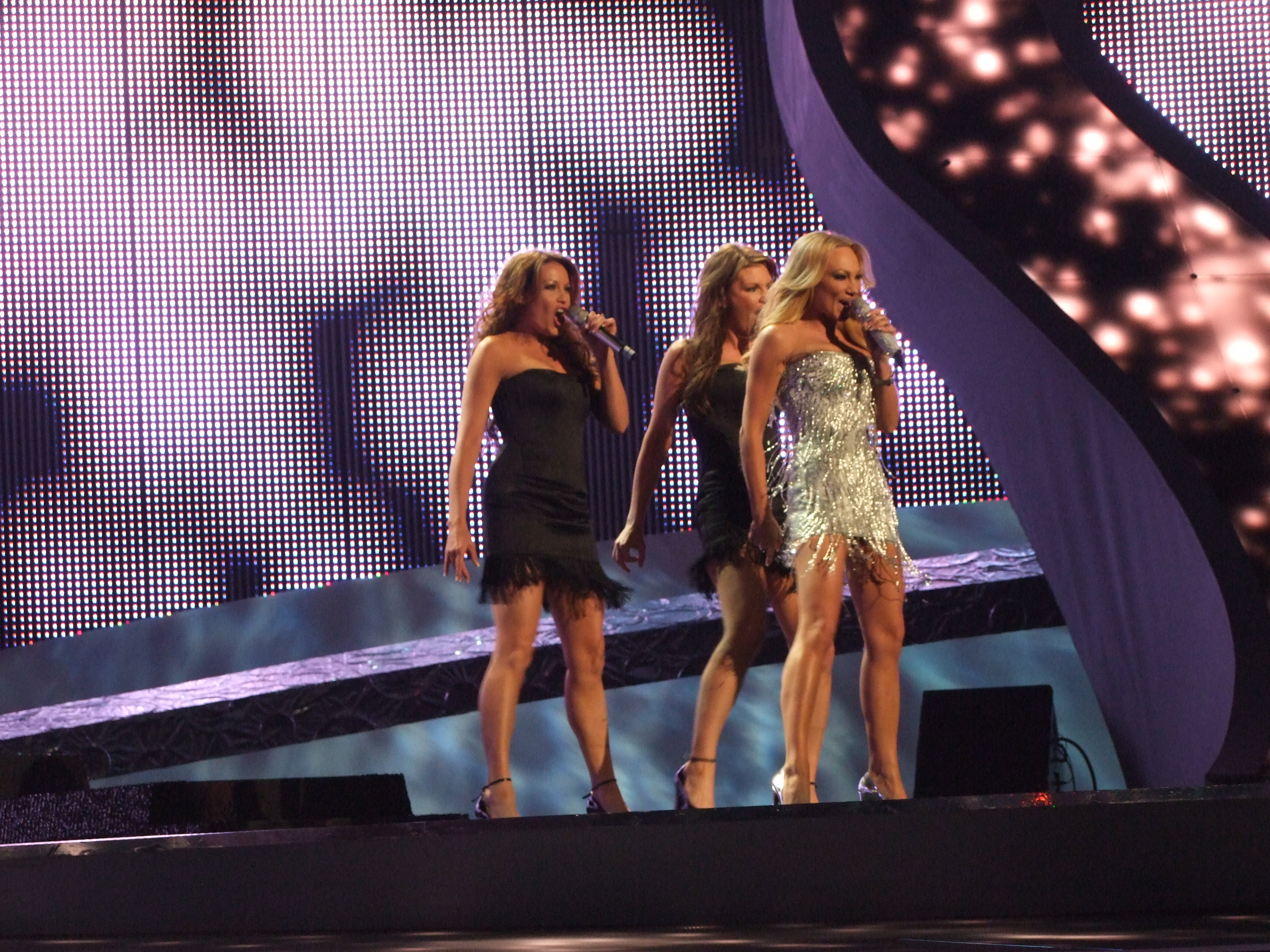
Perrelli performing "Hero" at the Eurovision Song Contest.

"Hero" participated in the fourth heat of the 2008 Melodifestivalen which was held on 1 March 2008 at the Telenor Arena in Karlskrona. The song was the last of the eight competing entries to perform and directly qualified to the contest final as one of the two songs which received the most telephone votes. On 15 March, during the final held at the Globe Arena in Stockholm, Perrelli was the first of the ten competing acts to perform, and "Hero" won the contest with 224 points, receiving the highest number of votes from the regional juries and the second-highest number of votes from the viewing public.

During the month of April and part of May, Perrelli went on a promotional tour through Europe. She visited Germany, Belgium, Albania, Montenegro, Serbia and the Netherlands. The single was released to radio stations in those countries to which she competed in the semifinal. She originally planned to visit Russia as well, but she didn't receive a visa in time and her tour there was cancelled.

Perrelli made it through the semifinal on 22 May in Eurovision Song Contest 2008 as the jury wildcard and competed in the final. She competed as number 15, the same that she had in 1999, when she won with "Take Me to Your Heaven". However, she only managed to finish 18th out of 25 entries with 47 points.

== Music video ==
The Music video was shot in Stockholm on 14 April 2008, and the filming went on for two days. Among other shooting spots some of the scenes were filmed in the room of Globen Arena. During the shoot Perrelli was assisted by a personal make-up artist and stylist, ten cameramen, and her sister, Kina Björk.

The music video was officially released on 7 May 2008.

== Cover versions ==
- At TV4's Så mycket bättre in 2018, the song was performed by Linnea Henriksson.

== Track listing ==
1. "Hero"
2. "Hero" (instrumental version)

== Chart positions ==
Chart (2008)	Peak position
European Hot 100 Singles	86
Finnish Singles Chart	18
Swedish Singles Chart	1
Danish Singles Chart	24
Swiss Singles Chart	65
Norwegian Singles Chart	20
Hungarian Airplay Chart	4
Turkish Singles Chart	20

=== Year-end charts ===
Chart (2008)	Position
Swedish Singles Chart	1
Chart (2009)	Position
Hungarian Singles Chart	18

== Release history ==
Country	Date
Sweden (Download)	February 2008
Sweden	12 March 2008
Norway	12 March 2008
Denmark	12 March 2008
Finland	12 March 2008
Belgium	Spring 2008
Austria	Spring 2008
Netherlands	Spring 2008
China	Autumn 2008
Poland	Autumn 2008
Hungary	Autumn 2008
