= Who's da Man =

Single by Elias featuring Frans
- Released: 17 May 2006
- Recorded: 2006
- Genre: Pop; reggae
- Length: 2:45
- Label: UMG
- Songwriters: Fredrik Andersson; I. Irhagen
- Producers: Fredrik Andersson; Maxe Axelsson

Elias singles chronology
"Sayonara" (2005)	"Who's da Man" (2006)	"Fotbollsfest" (2008)

Frans singles chronology
"Who's da Man" (2006)	"Kul med jul" (2006)

Music video
- "Who's da Man" on YouTube

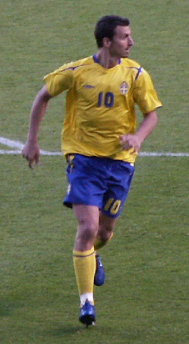
Zlatan Ibrahimović

"Who's da Man" (styled as "Who's da' man") is a Swedish song performed by Elias, featuring Swedish singer Frans. The song was released as a digital download in Sweden on 17 May 2006. The song is dedicated to the Swedish football player Zlatan Ibrahimović. It is sung in the Scanian dialect of Swedish. The song was the biggest summer Swedish hit of 2006, staying at the top of the charts for 10 consecutive weeks. Elias and Frans also performed the song at Allsång på Skansen.

During June 2006, the song was played by the carillon in the Fredrik Church in Karlskrona three times every evening until Sweden was knocked out of the tournament.

== Track listing ==
Digital download - EP
No.	Title	Length
1.	"Who's da' Man"	2:44
2.	"New York Reggae Day"	3:01
3.	"Who's da' Man" (Swedish version)	2:43
4.	"Who's da' Man" (no limit remix)	4:06
5.	"Who's da' Man" (no limit club version)	6:57

== Charts and certifications ==
=== Weekly charts ===
Chart (2006)	Peak position
Sweden (Sverigetopplistan)	1

=== Year-end charts ===
Chart (2006)	Position
Sweden (Sverigetopplistan)	1

=== Certifications ===
Region	Certification	Certified units/sales
Sweden (GLF)	Platinum	20,000^{^}
^{^} Shipments figures based on certification alone.

== Release history ==
Region	Date	Format	Label
Sweden	17 May 2006	Digital download	UMG
