= Mitt liv =

Studio album by Charlotte Perrelli
- Released: 24 February 2017
- Genre: Pop
- Language: Swedish

Charlotte Perrelli chronology
Min barndoms jul (2013)	Mitt liv (2017)

Mitt liv is the eighth studio album by Swedish singer Charlotte Perrelli, scheduled for release on 24 February 2017 (digital release) and 26 February 2017 (physical release). The first single "Höstens sista blomma" was released on 15 October 2016, and the second single "Mitt liv" was Perrelli's contribution to Melodifestivalen 2017.

== Track listing ==
1. "Tidlös tid"
2. "Ett hjärta av guld"
3. "Mitt liv"
4. "Lilla du"
5. "Här hos dig"
6. "Faller"
7. "Spår i sanden"
8. "I väntan på dig"
9. "Jag går ingenstans"
10. "Min hemlighet"
11. "Till låns"
