= Sommaren i city =

1991 song from the album Äventyr i natten by Angel

Single by Angel

from the album Äventyr i natten
- Language: Swedish
- B-side: "Sommaren i city" (instrumental)
- Released: 1991
- Genre: Pop
- Length: 3:41
- Label: Polydor Records
- Songwriters: Bobby Ljunggren; Håkan Almqvist; Eva Lindblad

"Sommaren i city" is a song written by Bobby Ljunggren, Håkan Almqvist and Eva Lindblad, and recorded by Swedish band Angel. The single was released in 1991 and became a hit upon release. It appeared on their 1992 album Äventyr i natten.

The song charted on the Svensktoppen for 12 weeks between 1 September and 17 November 1991, peaking at number three.

The track was also recorded by the band Lollipops for their 2001 album Vårat sommarlov, and Markus Landgren, Hannah Westin and Ida Hellberg from on the reality television show Fame Factory in 2003. The song incorporated instrumentals from sitars and bhangra drums.

== Charts ==
Chart (1991)	Peak position
Sweden (Sverigetopplistan)	3
