= Miss Decibel (song) =

Single by Wizex

from the album Miss Decibel
- Released: 1978
- Genre: Dansband music Schlager
- Label: Mariann
- Songwriter(s): Lasse Holm, Gert Lengstrand,

Wizex singles chronology
"Miss Decibel" (1978)	"En tokig sång" (1978)

Miss Decibel, written by Lasse Holm and Gert Lengstrand, is a song in Swedish, which finished 2nd at the Swedish Melodifestivalen 1978. It was performed by the Swedish "dansband" Wizex, back then including Kikki Danielsson as lead vocal singer, together with Lasse Holm. The song, which lyrical describes about a little singing-screaming girl and her parents who see her screaming abilities as an opportunity to become a singing star in the future, ends with a refrain in English including the words "Decibel, you gonna be a star".

Björn Skifs won that year's Melodifestivalen with the song "Det blir alltid värre framåt natten".

The single peaked at #10 at the Swedish singles chart. The song was also at Svensktoppen for eleven weeks during the period 16 April - 25 June 1978, peaking at #2.

The song was covered by Eva Rydberg later in 1978, on her album "Sång á la Rydberg". In 1979, musician Nils Dacke recorded the song for his album "Nils Dacke spelar partyorgel".

In 2008 the song was performed at Dansbandskampen by Martinez.

At Så mycket bättre 2017, the song was recorded by Uno Svenningsson as "Prins Decibel".

== Chart performance ==
Sweden Top 20
Week	10 March 1978	21 April 1978	5 May 1978
Position	10	17	18

== Charts ==
Chart (1978)	Peak position
Sweden (Sverigetopplistan)	10
