= Charlotte Perrelli =

Swedish singer and television host

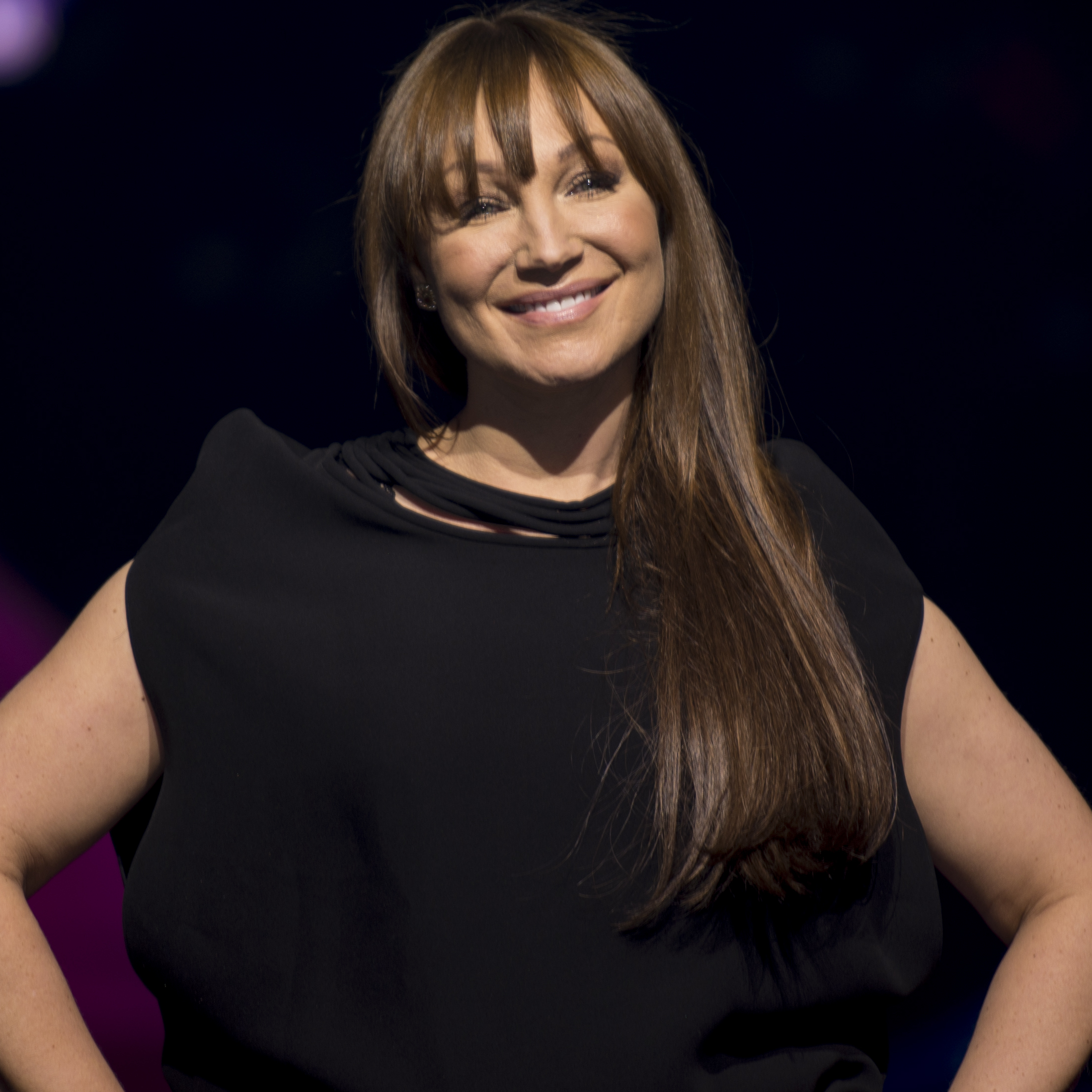
- Perrelli in 2017

Background information
- Also known as: Charlotte Nilsson
- Born: Anna Jenny Charlotte Nilsson; 7 October 1974 (age 52); Hovmantorp, Sweden
- Genres: Dansband (up to 1999); disco; pop; schlager
- Occupations: Singer; television host; author; actress; entrepreneur
- Instruments: Vocals, piano, guitar
- Years active: 1987–present
- Labels: Stockhouse (1999–2008, 2009–present); Universal Music (2008)
- Website: www.charlotteperrelli.com

Anna Jenny Charlotte Perrelli (Swedish: [ɧaˈɭɔtː pɛˈrɛ̌lːɪ]; née Nilsson; born 7 October 1974), known until 2003 by her maiden name, is a Swedish singer and television host. Under her maiden name, she won the Melodifestivalen 1999 and subsequently the Eurovision Song Contest 1999 with the song "Take Me to Your Heaven".

Since 1999 Perrelli has released seven albums and multiple singles. She once again won Melodifestivalen in 2008 and represented Sweden in the Eurovision Song Contest 2008 with her song "Hero". She is one of Sweden's most popular female singers, often performing at Sweden's top shows. Throughout her career, she has worked with different types of music, ranging from dansband and schlager, via modern pop, to soulful ballads and jazz melodies.

== Biography ==
=== 1987–1998 ===
Born in Hovmantorp, in the southern Swedish province of Småland, at the age of thirteen Nilsson joined a local dansband, Bengt Ingvars, which became "Bengt Ingvars med Charlotte". After finishing her compulsory school education, she moved from Hovmantorp to the neighbouring town of Växjö where she attended the High School of Performing Arts. She also became the lead singer of a band named Kendix.

In 1994, Nilsson started singing with the well-established dansband Anders Engbergs. After two albums, she left them and joined the highly successful Wizex in 1997. Larger venues and professional management increased the band's reputation. In 1998, the band was nominated for a Swedish Grammis (Grammy) for the album Mot nya mål, and the album Tusen och en natt that went gold.

From 1997 to 1998 Nilsson starred as the instructor Millan Svensson in the Swedish soap opera Vita lögner.

=== 1999–2000 ===
After winning national Melodifestivalen 1999, Nilsson went to Jerusalem to compete as the Swedish representative in the Eurovision Song Contest 1999 on 29 May with her song "Take Me to Your Heaven". She won the contest with 163 points, making her the fourth Swedish representative to win the competition following Carola Häggkvist's victory in 1991, the Herreys brothers' in 1984 and ABBA's in 1974.

Following her Eurovision success, Nilsson toured Europe and the Middle East, promoting her winning song. She also started working on her first solo album, Charlotte. Later that year, she was voted Sweden's sexiest woman by the magazine Café. She later released "I Write You a Lovesong", together with debut album Charlotte, which was well received. She did not appear at the Eurovision Song Contest 2000 due to a dispute with Sveriges Television.

=== 2001–2003 ===
In 2001 Nilsson released her second album, Miss Jealousy, a pop/rock album which included the top-20 hit single "You Got Me Going Crazy", written by Mårten Sandén, Johan Åberg and Paul Rein as well as the radio hit "Light of My Life". Following the release, she promoted the album throughout Europe and New Zealand.

Nilsson hosted the first semi-final of Melodifestivalen 2003 with Mark Levengood and Lena Philipsson. In April 2003 she performed in Jesus Christ Superstar in Stockholm. In September she released a new single, "Broken Heart", which was followed up by the album Gone Too Long in June 2004. The album contained songs such as "Gone Too Long", "Flashdance" and "Million Miles Away". Charlotte Nilsson changed her name to Charlotte Perrelli after her 2003 marriage, and has retained the surname since her 2009 divorce.

=== 2004–2007 ===
After the success in Melodifestivalen 2003, Perrelli was once again asked to host Melodifestivalen 2004. Perrelli, Peter Settman and Ola Lindholm ended up hosting the entire tour together. After the festival, Swedish TV4 offered her own show on the channel, Super Troupers, a talent-show for kids.

In mid-2004 she released her, until then, most successful album, Gone Too Long, which included songs by some of Sweden's top producers, including Jörgen Elofsson. The album topped the Swedish top for weeks and contained hits such as "A Million Miles Away" and "Gone Too Long". In the summer, she joined Robert Wells, Jill Johnson and others on the Rhapsody in Rock-tour in mid-2004. In the spring of 2005, she was a judge on Inför Eurovision, a TV show which previewed that year's Eurovision songs.

In 2006, she released the album I din röst, in honour of the famous jazz singer Monica Zetterlund, which covered Zetterlund's most famous songs, along with some personal favorites and the soul ballad "I din röst", the title song written by Perrelli for the album. The album was successful, and she performed many of the songs in Sweden's top shows such as Allsång på Skansen and Nationaldagen. She also co-hosted the TV show Tillsammans för världens barn in October, where she also performed "The Greatest Love of All".

In May 2007 Perrelli was the Swedish expert in the Nordic preview show panel discussion about the Eurovision Song Contest. In mid-2007 Perrelli toured Sweden with Diggiloo. She was joined by singers such as Linda Bengtzing, Lasse Holm, Molly Sandén, Lotta Engberg and Jan Johansen. During the summer she released the love ballad "Som du" which she performed at the popular show Sommarkrysset. During the autumn she released the single disco song "Jag är tillbaks" which she performed at the show Babban & Co.

=== 2008–2009 ===
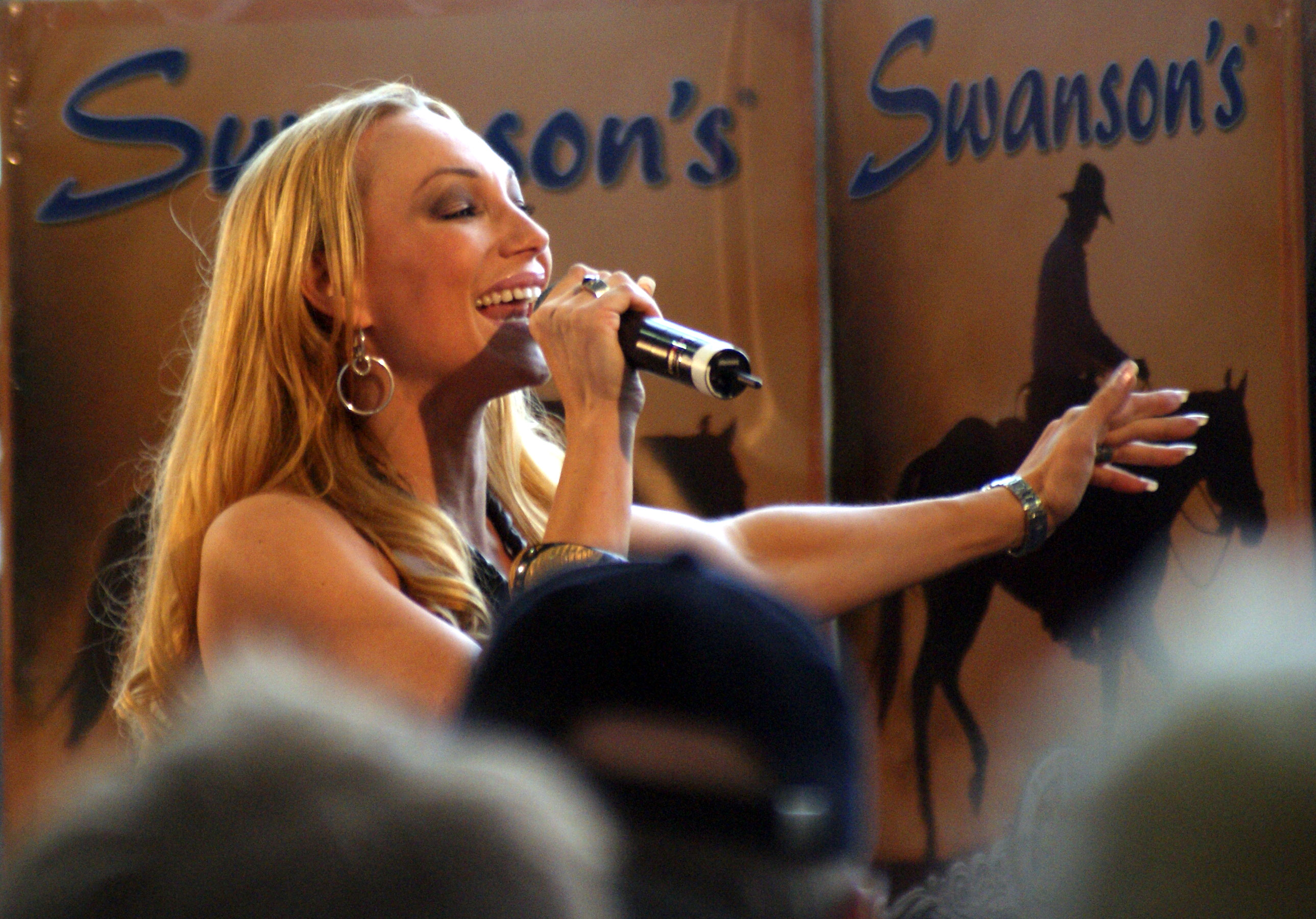
Perrelli performing at Överby Köpcenter, 5 April 2008.

On 15 March 2008, Perrelli performed at the Stockholm Globe Arena and won Melodifestivalen 2008 again with her song "Hero", which topped the charts in Sweden for several weeks and became the most sold single of 2008 for a Swedish artist. She went on to represent Sweden in the Eurovision Song Contest 2008 in Belgrade, Serbia, where she advanced to the finals. Preparing for Eurovision, she went out on a big tour, performing at popular TV shows in 17 nations, in order to promote the song.

On 14 April, Perrelli filmed the music video for "Hero" on location in Stockholm. She also released her album titled Hero, which went on to go platinum in Sweden. Despite being one of the favourites to win Eurovision, it finished 18th out of 25 entries in the final, with 47 points in total. The song "Bullet" was subsequently released as a single, performing moderately on the Swedish charts.

Perrelli started rehearsals for Rhapsody in Rock along with Wells, with whom she toured during that summer. Perrelli and Wells performed a concert in Beijing, China during the 2008 Summer Olympics. In August, it was revealed that Perrelli had signed a record deal with a Chinese record label; as a result, her album Hero was released in China.

During the autumn, she worked on her Christmas album Rimfrostjul, which was released in November 2008. She also performed on several of Sweden's top TV shows, such as Sommarkrysset, Victoriadagen and Nationaldagen. On 31 October 2008 Perrelli was a guest judge and coach for the remaining contestants on Idol 2008. In November and December, she promoted her Christmas album and toured Sweden. In the beginning of 2009, she travelled to Beijing to perform in a series of TV shows. She worked as a judge on the Swedish show Talang 2009.

=== 2010–present ===
At the Schlager pride in Stockholm in July 2009, she announced that she would release a new album in 2010; however, this was later put forward to 2012. Perrelli recorded a new single for the Swedish Royal Wedding in June 2010 together with pop singer Magnus Carlsson titled "Mitt livs gemål", which was very well received and performed throughout Sweden. In August, she released a fitness book titled Kan du Kan jag. In December 2010, she toured Swedish churches with her material from Rimfrostjul. Perrelli continued as a judge on Talang 2010 and Talang 2011. During the summer, she toured with Diggiloo once more. In November 2011, she confirmed that she would play Eva Peron in the Swedish version of the musical Evita at the Malmö Opera. As a result, she released Don't cry for me Argentina as a single.

She participated in Melodifestivalen 2012 with the entry "The Girl" by Fredrik Kempe in a bid to represent Sweden at the Eurovision Song Contest 2012 in Baku, Azerbaijan. In the fourth semi-final of the show, she came in fifth, and failed to qualify to the final. Nonetheless, she released her seventh album titled The Girl, which contained eight new tracks, including "Little Braveheart", a duet with Belgian singer Kate Ryan. Other hits include Just not tonight and No More Black & Blue. She also released her own perfume and shimmering lotion called The Girl.

In the summer of 2012, she once again toured with Diggiloo. After this, she released her second fitness book. In 2013, she released her second Christmas album titled Min barndoms jul and toured extensively in Scandinavia.

In 2015, she released the song Bröllopsvalsen which she performed at numerous events. The song is a tribute to her husband. She also released a book about pregnancy.

In 2017, she released the music album in Swedish titled Mitt liv. She also toured with Diggiloo during the summers of 2014, 2015, 2017 and 2018. In 2018, she appeared on Så mycket bättre which is broadcast on TV4. She released her autobiography in October 2018 titled Flickan från Småland, which was also the name of her 2019 tour of Sweden.

2019 saw Perrelli commentate for SVT at the Eurovision Song Contest 2019 in Israel beside Edward af Sillén, 20 years after winning the contest in the same country.

She participated in Melodifestivalen 2021 with the song "Still Young" when she qualified for the finale, where she came 8th with 60 points.

Perrelli performed as one of the interval acts in the second semi-final and final of the Eurovision Song Contest 2024 in Malmö.

== Personal life ==
In August 2003 in Oscar's Church, Charlotte Nilsson married Stockholm-based Swedish–Italian restaurateur Nicola Ingrosso, her partner since 1996. Their two sons were born in 2004 and 2005. Much of Ingrosso's family refused to attend the wedding amid a dispute that prompted Nicola and Charlotte to change their surnames to Perrelli, his mother's maiden name. Nicola's brothers are Emilio, whose ex-wife Pernilla Wahlgren and son Benjamin are also singers; and Vito, whose son Sebastian is a member of Swedish House Mafia. After speculation in Swedish media that the couple were experiencing relationship issues, Perrelli and Ingrosso officially announced their separation in June 2008. On 24 September 2009, the couple filed for divorce.

Since 2012, Perrelli has been in a relationship with Anders Jensen. Perrelli gave birth to the couple's first child on 30 July 2013. In October 2018, she gave birth to her fourth child.

Perrelli's nephews include Viggo Björck, a professional ice hockey player who is a forward for the Winnipeg Jets of the National Hockey League (NHL), drafted eighth overall by the Winnipeg Jets in the 2026 NHL entry draft., and Wilson Björck, who was drafted in the fifth round of the 2025 NHL entry draft by the Vancouver Canucks. Viggo picked Perrelli's song "Hero" as his official goal song for the 2026-2027 NHL hockey season.

== Discography ==
=== Albums ===
All studio albums and their chart positions in the Swedish Top 60 (SWE).

Year	Information	Peak positions	Info, sales and certifications
Year	Information	SWE	Info, sales and certifications
1999	Charlotte: 1st solo album; Released: 10 October 1999	3	Language: English; released in: Sweden; Certification:
2001	Miss Jealousy: Released: 5 April 2001	32	Language: English; released in: Sweden; Certification:
2004	Gone Too Long: Released: 30 June 2004	11	Language: English; released in: Sweden; Format: CD; Certification:
2006	I din röst: Released: 5 July 2006	29	Language: Swedish; released in: Sweden; Certification:
2008	Hero: Released: 23 April 2008 (Sweden) 16 September 2008 (USA)	3	Language: English; Released in: Sweden, USA, Poland, China; Certification: Platinum
2008	Rimfrostjul: Released: 10 November 2008	12	Language: Swedish/English; released in: Sweden; Certification: –
2012	The Girl: Released: 14 March 2012	7	Language: English; Released in: Sweden; Certification: –
2013	Min barndoms jul: Released: 20 November 2013	49	Language: Swedish; Released in: Sweden; Certification: –
2017	Mitt liv: Released: 24 February 2017		Language: Swedish; Released in: Sweden; Certification: Gold

=== Singles ===
Year	Title	Peak									Album
Year	Title	SWE	NOR	FIN	DEN	BEL	UK	NL	CH	HU	Album
1999	"Take Me to Your Heaven"	2	10	-	-	5	20	23	-	-	Charlotte
1999	"I Write You a Lovesong"	38	-	-	-	-	-	-	-	-	Charlotte
2000	"Damn You"	-	-	-	-	-	-	-	-	-	Charlotte
2001	"You Got Me Going Crazy"	20	-	-	-	-	-	-	-	-	Miss Jealousy
2003	"Broken Heart"	7	-	-	-	-	-	-	-	-	Gone Too Long
2004	"Million Miles Away"	11	-	-	-	-	-	-	-	-	Gone Too Long
2006	"I din röst"(promo single)	-	-	-	-	-	-	-	-	-	I din röst
2007	"Jag är tillbaks"	-	-	-	-	-	-	-	-	-	Single only
2008	"Hero"	1	20	18	24	-	-	-	65	4	Hero
2008	"Bullet"	-	-	-	-	-	-	-	-	-	Hero
2012	"The Girl"	7	-	-	-	-	-	-	-	-	The Girl
2012	"Little Braveheart" (with Kate Ryan)	-	-	-	-	-	-	-	-	-	The Girl
2012	"Just Not Tonight"	-	-	-	-	-	-	-	-	-	The Girl
2015	"Bröllopsvalsen"	-	-	-	-	-	-	-	-	-	Singles only
2016	"Här står jag"	-	-	-	-	-	-	-	-	-	Singles only
2016	"Höstens sista blomma"	-	-	-	-	-	-	-	-	-	Mitt liv
2017	"Mitt liv"	-	-	-	-	-	-	-	-	-	Mitt liv
2019	"Diva to Diva" (with Dana International)	-	-	-	-	-	-	-	-	-	Singles only
2021	"Still Young"	19	-	-	-	-	-	-	-	-	Singles only

=== Soundtracks ===
Soundtracks containing Charlotte Perrelli songs.

- 2000: Livet är en schlager soundtrack – "Jag vill bara älska med dig"

=== Compilations ===
Compilations containing Charlotte Perrelli songs.

- 1999: Absolute '99: The Best of 1999 – "Take Me to Your Heaven"
- 1999: Mr Music Hits – Vol 7, 1999 – "Take Me to Your Heaven"
- 1999: Maximum Dance – Vol 7, 1999 – "Take Me to Your Heaven"
- 1999: Absolute Music 30 – "Take Me to Your Heaven"
- 1999: 100% Semester – Vol 4 – "Take Me to Your Heaven"
- 2000: Eurovision Song Contest 1956–1999 – "Take Me to Your Heaven"
- 2000: Barn 2000 – "Behöver Dig Nu"
- 2000: Schooldays – "Tusen och en Natt"
- 2001: Melodifestivalen 2001 – "Tusen och en Natt"
- 2008: Melodifestivalen 2008 – "Hero"
- 2012: "Melodifestivalen 2012" – "The Girl"
- 2015: "Very Best of Eurovision Song Contest - 60th Anniversary" – "Take Me to Your Heaven"

Awards and achievements
Preceded by (Israel) Dana International with "Diva"	Winner of the Eurovision Song Contest; 1999	Succeeded by (Denmark) Olsen Brothers with "Fly on the Wings of Love"
Preceded by Jill Johnson with "Kärleken är"	Sweden in the Eurovision Song Contest; 1999	Succeeded by Roger Pontare with "When Spirits Are Calling My Name"
Preceded by The Ark with "The Worrying Kind"	Sweden in the Eurovision Song Contest; 2008	Succeeded by Malena Ernman with "La voix"
