= Lars Diedricson =

- Also known as: Dille
- Born: 12 August 1961
- Died: 6 March 2017 (aged 55) Partille, Sweden
- Genres: dansband music, pop, rock, schlager
- Occupations: musician, songwriter
- Years active: 1976–2017

Lars "Dille" Diedricson (12 August 1961 – 6 March 2017) was a Swedish musician and songwriter living in Skara.

He was a member of the band Snowstorm when it was founded in 1976 and in the 1990s Diedricson fronted the band Don Patrol who released two albums and opened for David Lee Roth in Europe in 1991. Don Patrol had reunited to release an album in 2015.

He won the Eurovision Song Contest 1999 as the songwriter for "Take Me to Your Heaven", performed by Charlotte Nilsson for Sweden.

== Death ==
Diedricson died in Gothenburg on 6 March 2017 at the age of 55.

Preceded by Tzvika Pick	Eurovision Song Contest winning composers 1999	Succeeded by Jørgen Olsen
