= When Spirits Are Calling My Name =

2000 song by Roger Pontare

Single by Roger Pontare
- Released: 2000
- Songwriters: Peter Dahl; Linda Jansson; Thomas Holmstrand

Eurovision Song Contest 2000 entry
- Country: Sweden
- Artist: Roger Pontare
- Language: English
- Composers: Peter Dahl; Linda Jansson; Thomas Holmstrand
- Lyricists: Peter Dahl; Linda Jansson; Thomas Holmstrand

Finals performance
- Final result: 7th
- Final points: 88

Entry chronology
- ◄ "Take Me to Your Heaven" (1999)
- "Listen to Your Heartbeat" (2001) ►

"When Spirits Are Calling My Name" (original Swedish title "När vindarna viskar mitt namn", literally translated as "When the Winds Whisper My Name") is a song performed by Roger Pontare. It represented Sweden in the Eurovision Song Contest 2000.

== Celebration of indigenous culture ==
The song extols the traditions of indigenous peoples and their efforts to protect their territories and cultures. For his solo appearance in 2000, Pontare wore a Sami costume associated with the indigenous population of Lapland in northern Sweden (and also the northern regions of Norway, Finland, and Russia). On his performance at the Eurovision Song Contest, Pontare was accompanied by a Cree, Inuit, and Norwegian Sami dancer.

== Eurovision Song Contest 2000 ==
Melodifestivalen 2000 was the 40th edition of the Swedish national selection for the Eurovision Song Contest, which was being held in the Ericsson Globe Arena in Stockholm after Charlotte Nilsson's victory the year before with "Take Me to Your Heaven". Roger Pontare won the right to represent his country after his song "När vindarna viskar mitt namn" was chosen by the Swedish public after earning 227 points in the final voting results at the 40th edition of Melodifestivalen. The song was then performed in English as "When Spirits Are Calling My Name" at the Eurovision Song Contest 2000.

The song performed 18th, after Croatia and before Macedonia, and finished in 7th place among 24 other competitors with a total of 88 points.

At the song's climax, flames erupted from two vents at the front of the stage.

== Popularity ==
"När vindarna viskar mitt namn" was also released as a single in 2000, which sold Swedish platina (30 000 copies). The single peaked at #3 at the Swedish singles chart. On 22 April 2000 the song directly entered Svensktoppen, where it stayed for two rounds. On 6 May 2000 the song was down at the third place after peaking for two weeks. On 5 August 2000 the song was 9th, being at the list for 16th at last time.

== Covers by other bands ==
Swedish bands Ultima Thule and HammerFall later covered "När vindarna viskar mitt namn".

== Track listing ==
1. När vindarna viskar mitt namn - 2:58
2. När vindarna viskar mitt namn (singback) - 2:58

Preceded by "Tusen och en natt" by Charlotte Nilsson	Melodifestivalen winners 2000	Succeeded by "Lyssna till ditt hjärta" by Friends
