= Alice May =

English singer and actress (1847–1887)

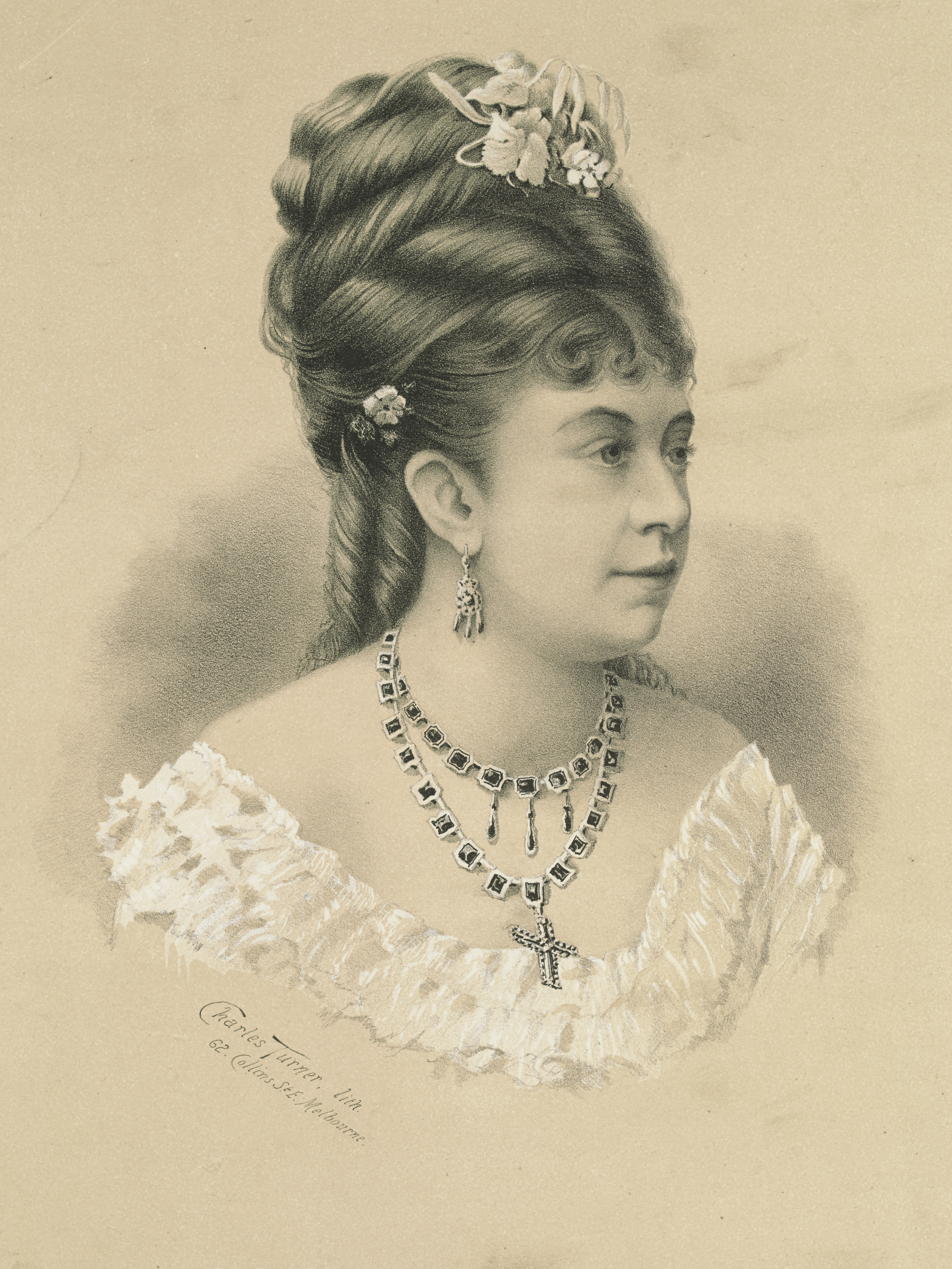
Alice May, early 1870s

Alice May (1847 – 16 August 1887) was an English singer and actress best remembered as the creator of the soprano role of Aline in Gilbert and Sullivan's The Sorcerer (1877).

After musical studies as a child, May studied voice in London with the composer George Benjamin Allen. She began singing in his concerts. May and Allen began to have a relationship, and she travelled with him to Australia in 1870, where they performed together in concerts. Beginning in 1872, May began star in comic operas in Australia. May and Allen returned to England in 1876, where she continued to perform in Offenbach works, earning good notices.

In 1877, May created the role of Aline in The Sorcerer, earning warm reviews, but she left the company after only two months. She quickly returned to Offenbach in London under the management of Richard D'Oyly Carte and, by 1882, she was touring with Emily Soldene's opera company. She split up with Allen and moved to the U.S. in 1883, where she performed first in New York but soon joined Charles Ford's Opera Company in St. Louis and on tour. The next year, she married Louis Raymond, another member of the company. She was earning good notices, but she began to miss performances due to her growing struggle with alcoholism. She continued to perform on tour until 1887, when she became ill and died at the age of 40.

== Biography ==
May was born in Yorkshire, England. She began to study music as a child. She sang amateur concerts in the 1860s. About 1868, she began to study voice in London with the composer George Benjamin Allen (1822–1897), with whom she later lived.

=== Early career ===
By 1869, May was singing professionally in Allen's concerts. In 1870, Allen and May had an opportunity to perform in Australia and made the voyage posing as Mr. and Mrs. Allen. She made her Australian concert debut at the Princess's Theatre, Melbourne, in 1870, receiving good notices. After building her reputation in concert work, May made her operatic debut with Lyster & Cagli's Royal Italian Opera Company in 1872, soon becoming Australia's leading comic opera soprano. She toured in New Zealand for a year, beginning in 1874, with Allen's Royal English Opera Company, followed by seasons with that company in Australia (Melbourne and Adelaide) and India (Calcutta and Madras).

After May and Allen returned to England, she first performed in Liverpool for R. W. South in December 1876, and later the same month she began to star at the Gaiety Theatre, London, in the title roles of Offenbach's La Grande-Duchesse de Gérolstein and La belle Hélène. She continued to star in operettas and became a client of Richard D'Oyly Carte's artiste agency. The Observer wrote in January 1877, "a morning performance of The Grand Duchess was on Wednesday last given at the Opera Comique Theatre. Miss May proved herself a capable heroine of opera bouffe, both in her singing and her acting.... The Opera is [presented by] Mr R. W. South's company". She then toured in The Grand Duchess and other operettas, earning good notices while also singing songs, such as G. B. Allen's "Unrest", in concert. In May, she played Mlle Lange in Charles Lecocq's operetta, La fille de Madame Angot. The Manchester Guardian wrote, "Miss Alice May [played] the part... with considerable power. Especially good was her acting in the scene in which the favourite realises that Clairette is her rival; in facial expression, in the tone of her voice, and in every gesture, Miss May succeeded in this scene in giving powerful expression to intense but subdued passion." After a recital in Belfast, Ireland, in early 1877, The Musical World printed not only a favourable review but also a celebratory poem dedicated to her. Her repertory was not restricted to comic opera; she was warmly praised as a Handel singer.

=== The Sorcerer and later London engagements ===
In the autumn of 1877, May's theatrical agent, Richard D'Oyly Carte, engaged both her and Allen for his Comedy-Opera Company. For Carte, May created the role of Aline in Gilbert and Sullivan's The Sorcerer at the Opera Comique, and Allen became musical director of the production. The Sorcerer opened on 17 November 1877. May received warm reviews, and her Act I aria was encored. The Era wrote: "we may again compliment Miss Alice May upon her graceful impersonation of Aline and her artistic singing". The Entr'acte and Limelight noted on 24 November 1877, "Miss Alice May vocalises with very good effect, and although she is known more as a vocalist than as a histrion, her acting seems as good as her singing." The Observer commented, "Miss Alice May carries off the main honours among the ladies". The following month, Allen was replaced as musical director, and in January 1878, May was replaced in the role of Aline.

Late in January 1878, she played Drogan in a revival of Jacques Offenbach's Geneviève de Brabant in Islington at the Royal Philharmonic Theatre in a production also managed by Carte. Allen was the musical director. After this, May starred in The Little Duke (1878, Royal Philharmonic), La petite demoiselle and La princesse de Trébizonde (both 1879 at the Alhambra Theatre), Les mousquetaires (1880, Globe Theatre), The Sultan of Mocha (1880 at the Theatre Royal, Manchester), Jeanne, Jeannette, and Jeanneton and The Bronze Horse (both in 1881 at the Alhambra). In March 1882, May was touring the British provinces with Emily Soldene's opera company, when a train on which they were travelling narrowly escaped a high-speed collision with an express train. Soldene, May and other members of the company were slightly injured falling off their beds as the quick-thinking engineer of a loose engine "ran full tilt at" the train Soldene's company were riding and quickly pushed it out of the way of the oncoming express train.

=== Last years in America ===
Allen and May separated in 1883, and she travelled to America. She debuted with the Barton English Opera Company in May 1883, in the title role of Michael Balfe's Satanella at New York's Standard Theatre. Her biographer, Adrienne Simpson, wrote that May was still reeling from her break-up with Allen and was drinking too much. This affected her performances and caused her to miss performances due to "indisposition". Satanella was a failure. Charles Ford, a son of John T. Ford, hired May for his St. Louis, Missouri opera company performing at Uhrig's Cave gardens and on tour. She first starred in F. C. Burnand and Meyer Lutz's operatic burlesque of Bluebeard, which had opened in London earlier that year. The piece was a popular hit, and May received excellent notices. She then starred in H. B. Farnie and Robert Planquette's Rip Van Winkle, another hit.

May married bass-baritone Louis W. Raymond, another actor with Ford's Opera Company, in 1884. May toured in America for several years in light opera. She now played the contralto character roles, including Little Buttercup in H.M.S. Pinafore, Ruth in The Pirates of Penzance, Lady Jane in Patience, Jelly in Gilbert and Clay's Princess Toto, and Katisha in the first authorised American production of The Mikado at Uhrig's Cave in St. Louis, in July 1885.

Although May achieved popularity as a touring performer in America, she continued to struggle with alcoholism and continued to miss performances. In 1887, she became very ill in St. Louis during a tour with the Bijou Opera Company. She died there, at City Hospital, only 40 years of age. She was buried in St. Louis by members of the company.
