= Michael Saxell =

Musical artist (born 1956)

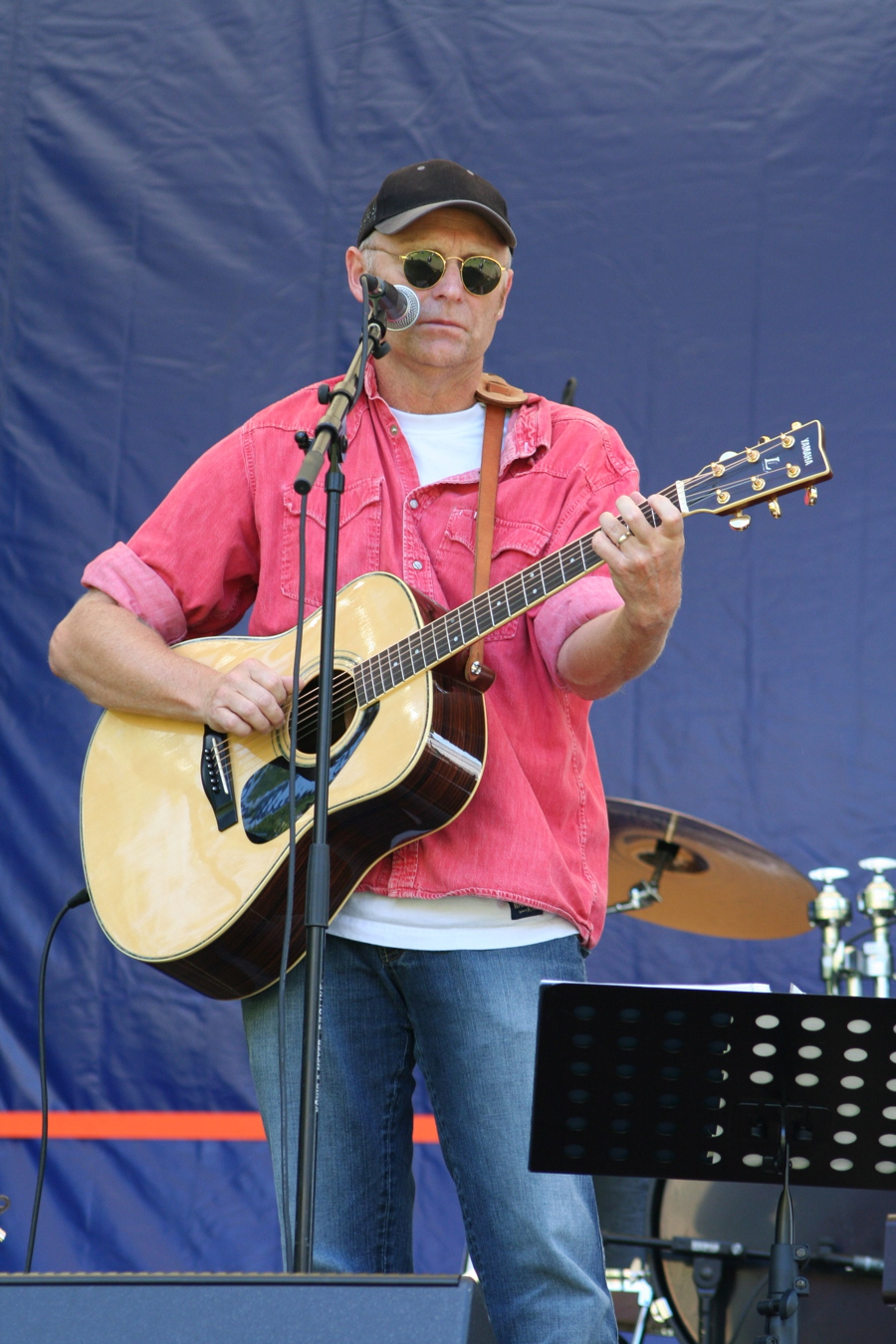
- Michael Saxell on stage at Sövde Amfiteater, Summer 2008

Background information
- Born: 1 October 1956 (age 69); Ystad, Scania, Sweden
- Occupations: Singer-songwriter, record producer, musician
- Instruments: Guitar, piano, vocals
- Years active: 1975–present
- Website: Official website

Michael Saxell (born 1 October 1956) is a Swedish singer-songwriter, composer, lyricist, multi-instrumentalist and producer. He was born in Helsingborg, Sweden but has spent many years on the Canadian west coast. He composed music for the Colin Nutley movie Änglagård – andra sommaren and for the soundtrack of Blådårar.

== Career ==
Saxell co-wrote the Swedish No. 1 hit song "If I Were Sorry", the Swedish Song of the Year Grammy Winner 2017 and winner of Melodifestivalen 2016 In March 2021, it had received more than 94 million Spotify plays and is certified seven x platinum status in Sweden, twice platinum in Poland, gold status in Germany and Austria. The song placed fifth in the Eurovision Song Contest finals in 2016.

He is co-writer of the Swedish No. 1 hit song "Johnny G (The Guidetti Song)", performed by artist Badpojken, a.k.a. the artists' collective Michael Saxell, Fredrik Andersson and Ingvar Irhagen. The song was released mid July 2015 and achieved Swedish quadruple-platinum status within 12 months of its release and has, as of March 2021, reached over 45 million plays on Spotify. Vocalist on "Johnny G" is Frida Green.

Saxell is co-writer with Craig Jacks on "Back Of A Map Of The Moon", which is included on Terry Jacks Greatest Hits 2015 release ...Starfish on the Beach – The Terry Jacks Collection.

Saxell grew up in the southern Swedish town of Malmö and currently resides on Österlen in Scania. He has written words and music to Scanian classics "Om himlen och Österlen" and "När en flicka talar skånska". More than 300 of his songs are recorded by other artists. Saxell has earned 24 gold, 11 platinum and 8 multi platinum Scandinavian records.

He received the prestigious SKAP (Swedish Composers of Popular Music) Stipendium award, honoring the memory of the Swedish songwriter and composer Evert Taube at an awards ceremony conducted at The Nordic Museum in Stockholm in May 2010.

Saxell performed on a tour of Estonia in May 2005 along with 2011 Nobel Prize in Literature winner Tomas Tranströmer, Jacques Werup, Eva Runefelt and others.

Saxell is featured as lead singer and co-writer of two songs with Keith Reid on the 2008 international release of the Procol Harum lyricist's album The Keith Reid Project – The Common Thread along with John Waite, Chris Thompson, Southside Johnny, Steve Booker, Terry Reid, Chaz Jankel and Bernie Shanahan.

Saxell composed the Lithuanian Grammy winning song of the year "Yra kaip yra" for the artist Mia in 2007 along with co-writers Christian Svensson and Sandra diAmante. The song was also the most played pop song on Lithuanian pop radio in 2007.

He is co-writer with Randy Bachman on the song "Repo Man" on Bachman & Turner, formerly of Bachman–Turner Overdrive, September 2010 worldwide album release.

Saxell produced and wrote songs for Swedish singer Lill Lindfors' 2005 EMI album release Här är den sköna sommar, which peaked at number 12 on the Swedish Best Selling albums chart.

He was warm-up act for Jeff Beck on his 1980 Canada tour.

Saxell's co-writing partners include Randy Bachman, Eric Bazilian, Douglas Carr, Randy Goodrum, Maurizio Fabrizio, Tim Krekel, Dickey Lee, Agi Lindroth, Christoffer Lundquist, Peter McCann, Cris Moore, Craig Northey, Keith Reid, Steve Porcaro, Mikael Rickfors, Christian Svensson, Jacques Werup, and many others.

== Discography (as performing artist) ==
- Saxell Jalle Bandet, Egna Händer 2013
- Christmas – the living room recordings (w Jennifer Saxell), Egna Händer 2009
- Alltid en vals (w Jalle Lorensson), Egna Händer 2008
- The Common Thread" (The Keith Reid Project), Rockville Music 2008
- Om himlen och Österlen, Egna Händer, 2006
- Wonky Windmill, Rootsy/Cobblestone Music, 2005
- Red and Blue, Wide Road Music/EMI, 1986
- It's Good To Be Alive, Mercury/PolyGram, 1981

== Discography (as producer) ==
- Här Är Den Sköna Sommar, Lill Lindfors, EMI, 2006
- Sken, Jacques Werup, Gazell Records, 2005
- Gör Mig Lite Levande, Lill Lindfors & Jacques Werup, Gazell Records 2004
- Karin Glenmark, Pool Sounds/Carlton Music, 1996
- Lost It All, Adversity, Manic Ears, 1988
