= Take Me to Your Heaven (song) =

1999 song by Charlotte Nilsson

Single by Charlotte Nilsson

from the album Charlotte
- B-side: "Tusen och en natt"
- Released: 7 June 1999
- Genre: Pop; dansband
- Length: 3:04
- Label: Mariann
- Composer: Lars Diedricson
- Lyricists: Marcos Ubeda; Gert Lengstrand
- Producer: Micke Wendt

Eurovision Song Contest 1999 entry
- Country: Sweden
- Artist: Charlotte Nilsson
- Language: English
- Composer: Lars Diedricson
- Lyricist: Marcos Ubeda

Finals performance
- Final result: 1st
- Final points: 163

Entry chronology
- ◄ "Kärleken är" (1998)
- "When Spirits Are Calling My Name" (2000) ►

Official performance video
- "Take Me to Your Heaven" on YouTube

"Take Me to Your Heaven" is a song by Swedish singer Charlotte Nilsson, with music composed by Lars Diedricson and English lyrics by Marcos Ubeda. It represented Sweden in the Eurovision Song Contest 1999 held in Jerusalem, winning the contest, having previously won that year's Melodifestivalen as "Tusen och en natt" (Swedish: [ˈtʉ̌ːsɛn ɔ ɛn ˈnatː]; "A thousand and one night") with Swedish lyrics by Gert Lengstrand. The English-language version was internationally released as a single on 7 June 1999, produced by Mikael Wendt. At the singles charts, it peaked at number two in Sweden, number five in Flanders, number 10 in Norway, and number 20 in the United Kingdom.

== Background ==
=== Conception ===
"Tusen och en natt" was composed by Lars Diedricson with Swedish lyrics by Gert Lengstrand, and recorded by Charlotte Nilsson.

In addition to the original Swedish-language version, she also recorded an English-language version of the song, "Take Me to Your Heaven", with the lyrics written by Marcos Ubeda. The song is an up-beat song about love, with the singer asking her lover to take her to heaven by loving her. The music video is set in the wintertime with Charlotte walking in the snow.

=== Eurovision ===
On 27 February 1999, "Tusen och en natt" performed by Nilsson in Swedish competed in the 38th edition of the Melodifestivalen. It received 217 points, winning the competition. As the festival was used by Sveriges Television (SVT) to select their song and performer for the 44th edition of the Eurovision Song Contest, the song became the Swedish entry, and Charlotte Nilsson the performer, for Eurovision.

On 29 May 1999, the Eurovision Song Contest was held at the International Convention Centre in Jerusalem hosted by the Israel Broadcasting Authority (IBA), and broadcast live throughout the continent. Nilsson performed "Take Me to Your Heaven" in English (taking advantage of new rules removing the requirement to perform in a national language) fifteenth on the night, following Cyprus's "Tha'ne erotas" by Marlain, and preceding Portugal's "Como tudo começou" by Rui Bandeira.

At the close of voting, the song had received 163 points, placing first and winning the contest. The song was succeeded in 2000 as contest winner by "Fly on the Wings of Love" by the Olsen Brothers representing Denmark.

=== Aftermath ===
Charlotte Nilsson represented Sweden again in the 2008 contest as Charlotte Perrelli with the song "Hero", placing eighteenth.

On 9 May 2024, Perrelli performed the song as part of a sing-along interval act in the second semi-final of the 2024 contest held in Malmö, Sweden. (Note: In a medley with "My Number One" by Helena Paparizou and "Everyway That I Can" by Sertab Erener.)

== Track listings ==
Swedish CD single

1. "Take Me to Your Heaven" – 3:04
2. "Tusen och en natt" – 3:38
3. "Take Me To Your Heaven" (Tocclo-Mix) – 3:24
4. "Take Me To Your Heaven" (The Specialist-Mix) – 4:25
5. "Take Me to Your Heaven" (Instrumental Version) – 3:04

UK CD single

1. "Take Me To Your Heaven" – 3:03
2. "Take Me To Your Heaven" (Club Mix – The Specialist-Mix II) – 4:16
3. "Take Me To Your Heaven" (RnB Mix – Tocclo-Mix) – 3:21
4. "Take Me To Your Heaven" (Dance Mix – The Specialist-Mix) – 4:25

UK cassette single

1. "Take Me to Your Heaven" – 3:00
2. "Take Me to Your Heaven" (Club Mix) – 4:16
3. "Take Me to Your Heaven" (RnB Mix) – 3:22
4. "Take Me to Your Heaven" (Dance Mix) – 4:22

== Charts ==
=== Weekly charts ===
Chart (1999)	Peak position
Belgium (Ultratop 50 Flanders)	5
Europe (Eurochart Hot 100)	38
Netherlands (Dutch Top 40)	21
Netherlands (Single Top 100)	23
Norway (VG-lista)	10
Scotland Singles (OCC)	17
Sweden (Sverigetopplistan)	2
UK Singles (OCC)	20

=== Year-end charts ===
Chart (1999)	Position
Belgium (Ultratop 50 Flanders)	64
Europe Border Breakers (Music & Media)	98
Netherlands (Dutch Top 40)	168
Sweden (Hitlistan)	49

== Release history ==
Region	Date	Format(s)	Label(s)	Ref.
Europe	7 June 1999	CD	Mariann	
United Kingdom	21 June 1999	CD; cassette	Mariann; Arista; BMG	

== Notes ==
Preceded by "Diva" by Dana International	Eurovision Song Contest winners 1999	Succeeded by "Fly on the Wings of Love" by Olsen Brothers
