= Wizex =

Dansband from Sweden

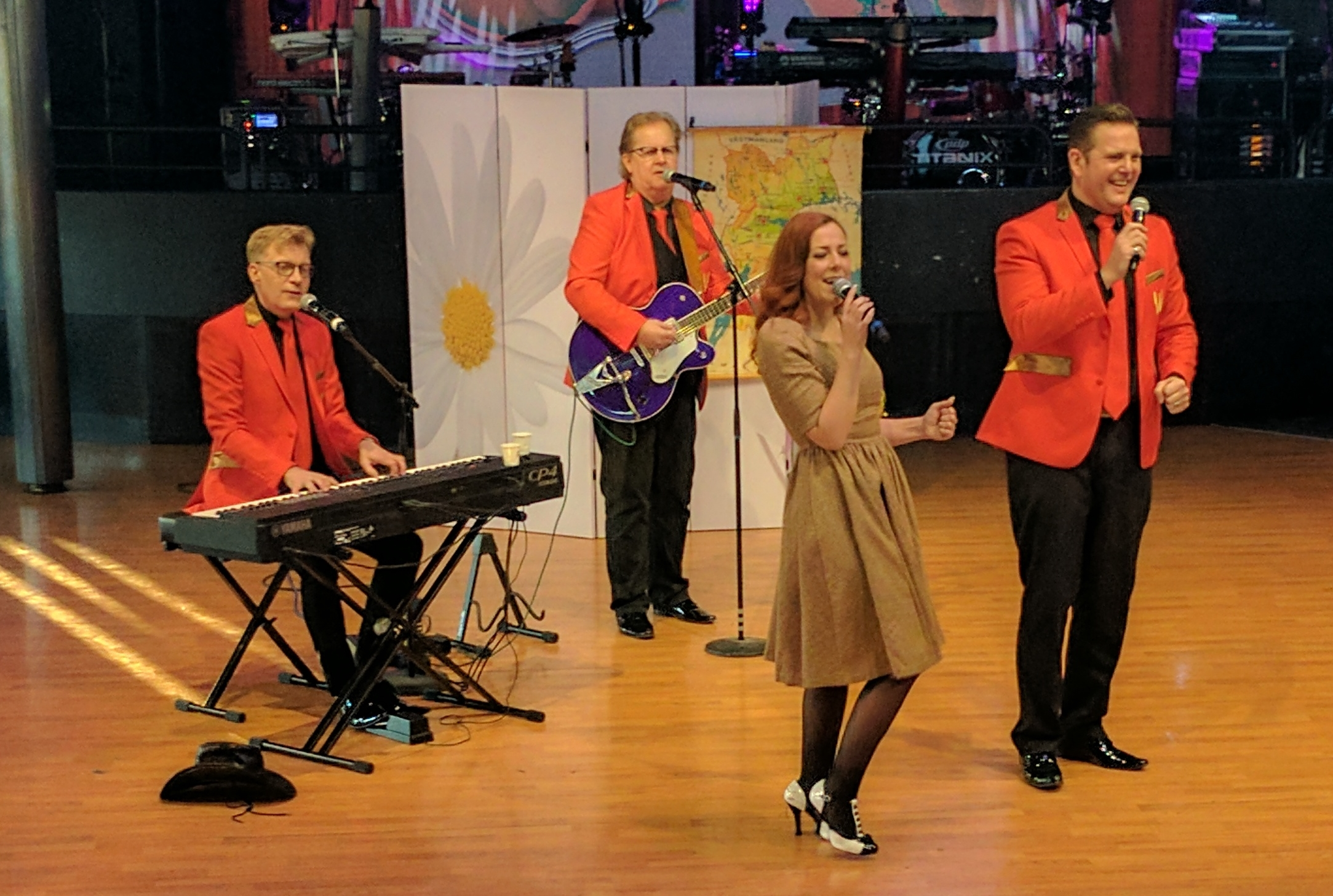
- Wizex performing in January 2017

Background information
- Origin: Osby, Sweden
- Genres: Dansband
- Years active: 1973–present

Wizex is a Swedish dansband formed in Osby in 1973. It purchased the rights to the name from a band that started as Ulrik Wittmans Kvintett in 1957. When Ulrik Wittman left the band in 1963 they started to use the name Wizex. When read out the name sounds like "The Six of Us", "vi sex", in Swedish, and there were six members in the band when the name was changed. Today, the band is considered to have six founders (who were allowed to purchase the name), and hence use 1973 as the starting point.

Wizex broke through in 1977 when they performed on nationwide TV-show Nygammalt and got its first top ten on the Swedish charts same year with the song Vagabond. The following year they finished 2nd in the Swedish Melodifestivalen 1978.

Big hits with Wizex were songs Tusen och en natt, Djupa vatten, Miss Decibel, Älska mig, Om himlen och Österlen, Flickan, jägarn och priset, Jag måste nå min ängel, Som en symfoni and När vi rör varann.

The record Take Me To Your Heaven sold 235 000 copies. The song was Charlotte Nilssons contribution to the Swedish Melodifestivalen 1999, and marked the starting point for her solo career. Wizex also had many Svensktoppen hits.

In 1979, Wizex won the Rockbjörnen award by Aftonbladet as "dansband of the year". This was the only time this category was included.

== Members ==
Following female singers have fronted Wizex since 1973, when Kikki Danielsson together with other founding members purchased the rights to the name Wizex:

- Kikki Danielsson, left in 1982
- Lena Pålsson, left in 1997
- Charlotte Nilsson, left in September 1999
- Paula Pennsäter, left in March 2002
- Jessica Sjöholm, left in 2007
- Anna Sköld, maternal leave in 2011
- Lina Wägbo, joined in 2011 as a temporary replacement
- Anna Sköld, left in 2021
- Git Persson, member since 2021

Other notable members were Danne Stråhed (2nd singer) and Henri Saffer (guitar).

== Discography ==
- 1974: Skratta och le
- 1975: Rusar vidare
- 1976: Har du glömt
- 1977: Som en sång
- 1978: Miss Decibel
- 1978: Carousel
- 1979: Wizex bäzta
- 1979: Some Girls & Trouble Boys
- 1980: Greatest Hits
- 1980: You Treated Me Wrong
- 1982: Nattfjäril
- 1983: Julie
- 1984: Det är dej jag väntar på
- 1985: Ska du komma loss
- 1987: Dansa i månens sken
- 1988: Mjölnarens Irene
- 1989: Vägen hem
- 1990: Spanska ögon
- 1992: Jag kan se en ängel
- 1992: Jag måste ge mej av
- 1993: Vår hemmagjorda dansmusik
- 1993: Julafton hemma
- 1995: Wizex med Lena Pålsson & Kikki Danielsson
- 1995: Varma vindar
- 1997: Några enkla rader
- 1997: Jorden snurrar
- 1997: Samma ensamma jag
- 1998: Mot nya mål
- 1999: Tusen och en natt
- 2000: Om du var här
- 2002: Guldkorn (2002)
- 2006: Wizexponerad
- 2010: Innan det är för sent
- 2012: Simsalabim
- 2013: 40 år i folkparkens tjänst
- 2014: Schlagers på väg
- 2015: Nu börjar det linka jul
- 2016: Game Set & Match
