= 20 bästa låtar =

Greatest hits album by Chips
- Released: 1997
- Recorded: 1980–1982
- Genre: Country pop, schlager
- Label: Mariann Grammofon

Chips chronology
Having a Party (1982)	20 bästa låtar (1997)

20 bästa låtar (Swedish for 20 best songs) is a 1997 compilation album from Swedish group Chips. 20 bästa låtar was released 14 years after Chips was disestablished in 1983.

== Track listing ==
1. Dag efter dag – Elisabeth & Kikki
2. Starry Night – Kikki & Lasse
3. Sensation – Lasse
4. Having a Party – Elisabeth & Kikki
5. In Arabia – Lasse
6. Jealousy – Elisabeth
7. Tokyo – Instrumental
8. So long Sally – Lasse
9. Don't Cry No More – Lasse
10. Someone Needs Somebodys Love – Kikki
11. Weekend – Kikki
12. Our Love is Over – Kikki
13. Paris – Lasse
14. Can't get over you – Kikki
15. Good Morning – Elisabeth, Kikki, Tanja & Lasse
16. I Remember High School – Tanja
17. A Little Bit of Loving – Kikki, Tanja & Lasse (Mycke' mycke' mer)
18. Get Him Out of Your Mind – Elisabeth
19. Nobodys Baby but Mine – Kikki
20. It Takes More than a Minute – Tanja
