= Fri – En samling =

Fri - En samling

Compilation album by Kikki Danielsson
- Released: October 29, 2001
- Genre: Country pop, dansband
- Label: Mariann Grammofon

Kikki Danielsson chronology
100% Kikki (2001)	Fri - En samling (2001)	Nu är det advent (2001)

Fri – En samling is a compilation album from Swedish pop and country singer Kikki Danielsson, released on October 29, 2001. The album contains songs who Kikki Danielsson recorded, self or together with other, between the years 1977–2001. Four of the songs were new back in 2001: "Fri", "Lämna mig inte", "I mitt hem" and "Rör vid mej". In 2002, Swedish band Barbados recorded an English language version of the title track "Fri", as "Sweet Little Angel".

== Track listing ==
1. "Fri" – 3.03
2. "Bra vibrationer" - 3.03
3. "När vi rör varann" - 4.00
4. "God morgon" - 3.01 (Sweets 'n' Chips)
5. "Dag efter dag" - 2.54 (Chips)
6. "Lämna mig inte" - 3.35
7. "Lost in France" - 3.36
8. "Comment ça va" - 3.46
9. "I mitt hem" - 4.04
10. "Papaya Coconut" - 3.57
11. "Talking in Your Sleep" - 3.03
12. "Amazing Grace" - 5.16
13. "Mycke' mycke' mer" - 3.29 (Chips)
14. "Hem till Norden" - 3.01
15. "Miss Decibel" - 2.41 (Wizex & Lasse Holm)
16. "U.S. of America" - 3.48
17. "Cowboy Yoddle Song" - 2.10
18. "My Broken Souvenirs" - 3.45
19. "Stand by Your Man" - 2.36
20. "Que Sera Sera" - 3.35
21. "Mitt innersta rum" - 4.09
22. "Rör vid mej" - 3.49
