= Having a Party (Chips album) =

Studio album by Chips
- Released: May 1982
- Genre: Country pop, schlager
- Label: Mariann

Chips chronology
Chips (1980)	Having a Party (1982)	20 bästa låtar (1997)

Having a Party is a 1982 studio album from Swedish group Chips. It was released in May 1982. The album sold more than 100 000 copies in Sweden, both gold and platinum. Back in those days, the demands for selling gold and platinum were higher than as of today (2006). Gold was at least 50 000 and platinum was at least 100 000.

== Track listing ==
=== Side A ===
1. "Having a Party" - 3.02
2. "Get Him out of Your Mind" - 3.20 (Elisabeth)
3. "Our Love is Over" - 4.18 - (Kikki)
4. "Day after Day" (Dag efter dag) - 2.54
5. "Someone Needs Somebodys Love" - 3.40 (Kikki)
6. "I Believe in You" - 4.40 (Elisabeth)

=== Side B ===
1. "Jealousy" - 3.52 (Elisabeth)
2. "Good Morning" (God morgon) - 3.00
3. "Bang Bang (He Shot 'em Down)" - 4.35 (Lasse Holm)
4. "Tokyo" - 3.00 (Instrumental)
5. "Nobodys Baby but Mine" - 3.10 (Kikki)
6. "Dag efter dag" - 2.54

== Contributing musicians ==
- Song: Kikki Danielsson, Elisabeth Andreasson, Lasse Holm
- Bass: Rutger Gunnarsson, Mike Watson
- drums: "Hulken", Per Lindvall
- Piano: Lasse Holm
- Saxophone: Hans Arktoft, Hector Bingert, Ulf Andersson
- String arrangements: Rutger Gunnarsson, Anders Engberg
- Guitar: Hasse Rosén, Lasse Wellander
- Lead guitar: Lasse Holm

== Lyrics and music ==
All text and lyrics by Lasse Holm and Torgny Söderberg except:

- "Dag efter dag"/"Day after Day": Lasse Holm and Monica Forsberg
- "Good Morning": Lasse Holm and Monica Forsberg
- "Tokyo": Lasse Holm

== Charts ==
Chart (1982)	Peak position
Norwegian Albums (VG-lista)	15
Swedish Albums (Sverigetopplistan)	12
