= Ingen utan mig =

Studio album by Blender
- Released: July 6, 2011
- Genre: dansband music

Blender chronology
Välommen in (2009)	Ingen utan mig (2011)	Live i studio 4 (2012)

Ingen utan mig is a 2011 Blender studio album.

The fourth track, "Minnen från lyckliga dar", was tested for Svensktoppen on 11 September 2011, but failed to enter chart. The song was also nominated for Guldklaven in 2012. The album also consists of interpretations from the band's participation at Dansbandskampen 2009, with songs like "Dag efter dag" and "Hold Me Now".

== Track listing ==
1. Jag lever för en dag (Jimmy Jansson)
2. Visa ditt hjärta (Johan Stentorp/ Lasse Andersson)
3. Bara du (Magnus Funemyr)
4. Minnen från lyckliga dar (Andreas Åhlin/Ulf Georgsson)
5. Som en främling (Linda Dahl/Peter Dahl/Thomas Holmstrand)
6. När vi äntligen såg varann (J. Richter/J. Berthelsen/M. Berntoft/M. Denebi/K. Wanscher/M. Leintz/Dan Attlerud)
7. Ingen utan mig (Henrik Sethsson/Thomas G:sson)
8. Du döljer det bra (Johan Stentorp/Jascha Richter)
9. Dag efter dag (Lasse Holm/Monica Forsberg)
10. Angeline (Samuel Waermö/Markus Englöf/Ingela Forsman)
11. Nej, nej, nej, nej (Kjell Jennstig/Leif Goldkuhl)
12. Kärleken gör underverk (Samuel Waermö/Mimmi Waermö/Marcus Englöf/Ingela Forsman)
13. Hold Me Now (Johnny Logan)

== Charts ==
Chart (2011)	Peak position
Sweden (Sverigetopplistan)	31
