= Weekend (Earth and Fire song) =

1979 single by Earth and Fire

Single by Earth and Fire

from the album Reality Fills Fantasy
- B-side: "Answer Me"
- Released: November 1979
- Genre: Disco
- Length: 3:35
- Label: Vertigo
- Songwriter: Gerard Koerts
- Producers: Earth and Fire; Gerrit-Jan Leenders

Earth and Fire singles chronology
"7, 8th Avenue" (1977)	"Weekend" (1979)	"Fire of Love" (1980)

"Weekend" is a song by Dutch band Earth and Fire. It was released by Earth and Fire as a single in November 1979 and reached the number one spot in the singles charts in the Netherlands, Switzerland, West Germany, Denmark and Portugal. It was written by keyboard player Gerard Koerts for the album Reality Fills Fantasy.

== Track listing ==
Side one
No.	Title	Writer(s)	Length
1.	"Weekend"	Gerard Koerts	3:35

Side two
No.	Title	Writer(s)	Length
2.	"Answer Me"	Chris Koerts, Bert Ruiter	5:16

== Charts ==
=== Weekly charts ===
Chart (1979–1980)	Peak position
Austria (Ö3 Austria Top 40)	14
Belgium (Joepie)	1
Belgium (Ultratop 50 Flanders)	1
Denmark (IFPI)	1
Netherlands (Dutch Top 40)	1
Netherlands (Single Top 100)	1
Portugal (AFP)	1
Switzerland (Schweizer Hitparade)	1
West Germany (GfK)	1

=== Year-end charts ===
Chart (1979)	Position
Belgium (Ultratop)	61
Netherlands (Dutch Top 40)	66
Netherlands (Single Top 100)	28

Chart (1980)	Position
Belgium (Ultratop)	74
Netherlands (Dutch Top 40)	94
Netherlands (Single Top 100)	89
Switzerland (Schweizer Hitparade)	5
West Germany (Media Control)	8

== Certifications ==
Certifications for "Weekend"
Region	Certification	Certified units/sales
Netherlands (NVPI)	Platinum	150,000^{^}
^{^} Shipments figures based on certification alone.

== Chips version ==
"Weekend"

Single by Chips

from the album Chips and 20 bästa låtar
- Released: January 1997
- Length: 3:35
- Label: Mariann Grammofon AB
- Songwriter: Gerard Koerts
- Producer: Chips

Chips singles chronology
"Dag efter dag" (1982)	"Weekend" (1997)

"Weekend" was first covered by the Swedish group Chips on their eponymously titled debut-album. Originally, the version was recorded in 1980, but was only available on the album's first printed issues, as all subsequent releases (now called "Sweets'n Chips") replaced the song with the track "Good Morning". It wasn't until the release of the 1997 Greatest Hits-album "20 bästa låtar" that the song became widely available again. The B-Side on the single was the Instrumental track "Tokyo".

=== Track listing ===
Side one
No.	Title	Writer(s)	Length
1.	"Weekend"	Gerard Koerts	3:35

Side two
No.	Title	Writer(s)	Length
2.	"Tokyo"	Lasse Holm	3:00

== Scooter version ==
"Weekend!"

Single by Scooter

from the album The Stadium Techno Experience
- B-side: "Curfew"
- Released: 24 February 2003
- Length: 3:35
- Label: Sheffield Tunes
- Songwriters: Gerard Koerts, H. P. Baxxter, Rick J. Jordan, Jay Frog, Jens Thele
- Producer: Scooter

Scooter singles chronology
"Nessaja" (2002)	"Weekend!" (2003)	"The Night" (2003)

"Weekend" was also covered by German techno group Scooter as "Weekend!". It was released on 24 February 2003 as the first single from their ninth studio album, The Stadium Techno Experience (2003). The single reached number two in Germany and was a top-10 hit in Austria, Denmark, Finland, the Netherlands, Norway, and Sweden. In Norway, the song is certified Platinum for sales exceeding 10,000.

=== Music video ===
The video for the song takes place on an illuminated part of a loam-covered floor encircled by dark. While Scooter are performing the song, there are Buddhist and Christian monks, nuns, Asian martial artists, topless women dancing and making out, traditional Indian female dancers and Ganesha dancing around them. H. P. Baxxter can also be seen wearing a costume resembling those worn by the Roman centurions. The video was censored in the multimedia part of the CD single released in Germany.

On 13 March 2008, British music channel Clubland TV broadcast the uncensored video, featuring female topless dancers, at 7:05pm, almost two hours before the watershed. Two viewers complained to Ofcom, the regulatory body who concluded that this was an isolated incident, as Clubland TV were a new channel and played the unedited version in error over the intended censored version. The channel apologised for the incident.

=== Track listing ===
No.	Title	Length
1.	"Weekend!" (Radio Edit)	3:35
2.	"Weekend!" (Extended)	5:10
3.	"Weekend!" (Club Mix)	6:02
4.	"Curfew"	3:14

=== Charts ===
==== Weekly charts ====
Chart (2003)	Peak position
Australia (ARIA)	37
Austria (Ö3 Austria Top 40)	4
Belgium (Ultratop 50 Flanders)	35
Denmark (Tracklisten)	4
Europe (Eurochart Hot 100)	10
Finland (Suomen virallinen lista)	7
Germany (GfK)	2
Hungary (Single Top 40)	1
Ireland (IRMA)	14
Ireland Dance (IRMA)	1
Netherlands (Dutch Top 40)	17
Netherlands (Single Top 100)	7
Norway (VG-lista)	3
Romania (Romanian Top 100)	97
Scotland Singles (Official Charts)	4
Sweden (Sverigetopplistan)	9
Switzerland (Schweizer Hitparade)	33
UK Singles (Official Charts)	12
UK Dance (Official Charts)	12
UK Indie (Official Charts)	1

==== Year-end charts ====
Chart (2003)	Position
Austria (Ö3 Austria Top 40)	54
Germany (Media Control GfK)	44
Ireland (IRMA)	98
Netherlands (Dutch Top 40)	96
Netherlands (Single Top 100)	44
Sweden (Hitlistan)	53
UK Singles (OCC)	121

=== Certifications ===
Region	Certification	Certified units/sales
Norway (IFPI Norway)	Platinum	10,000^{*}
^{*} Sales figures based on certification alone.

=== Release history ===
Region	Date	Format(s)	Label(s)	Ref.
Germany	24 February 2003	CD	Sheffield Tunes	
United Kingdom	24 March 2003	12-inch vinyl; CD; cassette	Sheffield Tunes	
Australia	14 April 2003	CD	Addiction	

== Other versions ==
In 1980, the Belgian band De Strangers released a Dutch-language version of the song under the title "Pluchke".

In 1980, Conny Morin released a German version as "Kein Mädchen für das Wochenende". This version later was covered by Daniela Dilow.

In 2002, Kid Q released the single "This Feeling", which contains a sample of "Weekend".

In 2008, Bloodhound Gang released a cover version of the Scooter cover, "Weekend!"

In 2012, Belgian electro producer Mickey released a cover version of the original track, featuring Sylvie 'Billie' Kreusch.

In 2017, Dutch artist De Ambassade released a New wave/Synth-pop rendition of the song under the title "Jerney", after the lead singer of Earth and Fire Jerney Kaagman.

In 2019, German DSDS Star Sarah Lombardi released "Weekend", a collaboration with DJ Herzbeat, as Schlager Song. The Song peaked at Number 93 of the GfK Entertainment Charts, and reached Number 1 on ITunes the week after its release.

In 2019, Cordon Rouge released a cover version, "Le Weekend".

In 2020, German DJ LIZOT released a cover version of "Weekend".
