= Fri =

Fri is a common abbreviation of Friday.

Fri or FRI may also refer to:

- TV 2 Fri, a Danish television channel
- Fri (yacht), involved in anti-nuclear protests
- Fri – En samling, a 2001 album by Kikki Danielsson
- Family Research Institute, US
- Forest Research Institute (disambiguation)
- Fractionation Research Inc., researching distillation systems
- Fulmer Research Institute, a UK R&D organization (1945-1990)
- Icelandic Athletic Federation (Icelandic: Frjálsíþróttasamband Íslands)
- Left Revolutionary Front (Bolivia) (Spanish: Frente Revolucionario de Izquierda)
- The Norwegian Organisation for Sexual and Gender Diversity (Norwegian: Foreningen for kjønns- og seksualitetsmangfold)
- Fri, the capital of the Greek island of Kasos in the Dodecanese
