= The Stadium Techno Experience =

Studio album by Scooter
- Released: 31 March 2003
- Recorded: 2002
- Studios: Loop D.C. Studios 1 and 2, Hamburg, Germany
- Genres: Hardcore techno; techno; Eurodance
- Length: 47:32
- Label: Sheffield Tunes
- Producer: Scooter

Scooter chronology
24 Carat Gold (2002)	The Stadium Techno Experience (2003)	Mind the Gap (2004)

Singles from The Stadium Techno Experience
- 1. "Weekend!" Released: 24 February 2003; 2. "The Night" Released: 26 May 2003; 3. "Maria (I Like It Loud)" Released: 11 August 2003

Professional ratings
Review scores
Source	Rating
AllMusic	3/5 stars
Random.Access	9.0/10

The Stadium Techno Experience is the ninth studio album by German hard dance group Scooter. Three singles were released from it: "Weekend!", "The Night" and a remix of "Maria (I Like It Loud)" featuring Marc Acardipane and Dick Rules. Its artwork is an homage to the 1991 album The White Room by The KLF. It is the first album featuring Jay Frog. In the United Kingdom, The Stadium Techno Experience became Scooter's second studio album in the top 40 after Our Happy Hardcore (1996).

The album was re-released on LP on 28 August 2026, which was available on black and yellow LP, with the yellow coloured vinyl being limited to 500 copies.

== Track listing ==
All songs written by H.P. Baxxter, Rick J. Jordan, Jay Frog, and Jens Thele, except where noted. M.C. lyrics by H.P. Baxxter a.k.a. "The Chicks Terminator"

1. "Ignition" – 0:36
2. "Maria (I Like It Loud)" (Baxxter, Jordan, Frog, Thele, Marc Acardipane, Shawn Mierez) – 3:55
3. "Weekend!" (Baxxter, Jordan, Frog, Thele, Gerard Koerts) – 3:32
4. "Take a Break" – 4:15
5. "Pulstar" (Vangelis) – 4:33
6. "The Night" – 3:21
7. "Roll Baby Roll" – 3:45
8. "Level One" (Baxxter, Jordan, Frog, Thele, Chris Hülsbeck) – 3:34
9. "Like Hypa Said" – 6:23
10. "Liquid is Liquid" (Baxxter, Jordan, Frog, Thele, Shane Heneghan, Eamon Downes) – 4:45
11. "A Little Bit Too Fast" – 3:45
12. "Soultrain" – 5:08

== Sample credits ==
- "Ignition" samples "The Final Conflict", composed by Jerry Goldsmith for the film Omen III: The Final Conflict.
- "Maria (I Like It Loud)" is based on the 2002 rework of the song "I Like It Loud" by Marc Acardipane feat. Dick Rules. The original song is written by Marc Acardipane and was released in 1997 under the name "Marshall Masters feat. The Ultimate MC". The single version of "Maria (I Like It Loud)" was released under the name "Scooter vs. Marc Acardipane & Dick Rules" and both Marc Acardipane and Dick Rules have appeared in the music video.
- "Weekend!" samples "Weekend" by Earth & Fire as well as "Strange World" by Push (aka M.I.K.E.), and "America: What Time Is Love?" by The KLF. The music video is based on the music video by The KLF. Three versions of the music video were released: censored (or UK video), uncensored and the X-rated video.
- "Take a Break" samples a popular song of the American Civil War called "When Johnny Comes Marching Home".
- "Pulstar" is based on the work of the same name by Vangelis, and is party based on Donna Summer's 1977 single, "I Feel Love"
- "The Night" samples both Italian disco star Valerie Dore's hit 1984 single, "The Night" and "Magic Impulse" by Exposure. The song is probably inspired by Jay Frog's remix of the song released as "Planet Trax Remix" on the 1997 CD single "The Night" by Valerie. Two versions of the music video were released: censored video (or UK video) and uncensored video.
- "Roll Baby Roll" samples the ABBA song "Arrival", taken from the 1976 album of the same name. It was replaced on later issues of the album (including 20 Years of Hardcore expanded edition) with the song "Swinging in the Jungle" with the different melody due to copyright violations. However, in 2008 Scooter performed "Roll Baby Roll" with the original melody by ABBA live in Berlin. The song appeared in the live stream by the VIVA TV channel, but was not included in the DVD version of the concert released as the part of the Jumping All Over the World album. In 2014 "Roll Baby Roll" was performed again during the 20 Years of Hardcore tour, but there were neither livestream nor official video of the tour however.
- "Level One" samples the song "Freedom" by Chris Hülsbeck, the ending theme of Turrican II, and is probably inspired by the song "See You in the Next Life" by Atlantis ITA.
- "Liquid is Liquid" is the rework of the same name song by Liquid and also includes elements of the song "The Second Trip (DJ Scot Project Mix)" by Hennes & Cold.
- "A Little Bit Too Fast" samples the song "I Am Rushin'" by Bump.
- "Siberia" samples taken from Turkish folk song "Hüma Kuşu" performed by Devrim Kaya (on the 20 Years of Hardcore expanded edition).

== Charts ==
=== Weekly charts ===
Weekly chart performance for The Stadium Techno Experience
Chart (2003)	Peak position
Austrian Albums (Ö3 Austria)	14
Dutch Albums (Album Top 100)	28
Finnish Albums (Suomen virallinen lista)	12
German Albums (Offizielle Top 100)	7
Hungarian Albums (MAHASZ)	3
Norwegian Albums (VG-lista)	3
Portuguese Albums (AFP)	5
Scottish Albums (Official Charts)	10
Swedish Albums (Sverigetopplistan)	4
Swiss Albums (Schweizer Hitparade)	35
UK Albums (Official Charts)	20
UK Independent Albums (Official Charts)	5

=== Year-end charts ===
Year-end chart performance for The Stadium Techno Experience
Chart (2003)	Position
German Albums (Offizielle Top 100)	69
Swedish Albums (Sverigetopplistan)	65

== Certifications ==
Certifications for The Stadium Techno Experience
Region	Certification	Certified units/sales
Hungary (MAHASZ)	Gold	10,000^{^}
Norway (IFPI Norway)	Gold	20,000^{*}
Sweden (GLF)	Gold	30,000^{^}
United Kingdom (BPI)	Silver	60,000^{^}
^{*} Sales figures based on certification alone.^{^} Shipments figures based on certification alone.
