= Once in a Lifetime (2000 film) =

Livet är en schlager Once in a Lifetime
- Directed by: Susanne Bier
- Written by: Jonas Gardell
- Produced by: Thomas Heinesen
- Starring: Helena Bergström; Jonas Karlsson; Björn Kjellman
- Release date: 10 November 2000
- Running time: 106 minutes
- Country: Sweden
- Language: Swedish

Livet är en schlager (Life is a Schlager, also known as Once in a Lifetime or Hånden på hjertet in Danish) is a Swedish film released in 2000, written by Jonas Gardell and directed by his usual directing partner Susanne Bier. The film features cameo appearances by many Swedish singers. The film was produced by Nordisk Film and Sveriges Television in association with Sonet Film and TV2 Denmark.

== Plot ==
The film is based around the life of Mona Berglund, a mother-of-four obsessed with the Eurovision Song Contest - so much so, that her house is decorated with posters of her idols, and she has named her children after Swedish Eurovision performers: Kikki, Anna Book, Lena PH and Carola. Her partner Bosse is unemployed, and she is left to feed the family. Her brother, Candy, is a transvestite and an AIDS-sufferer who designs clothes. David, Mona's employer has cerebral palsy and is a proficient songwriter, and composes a song which Mona steals and sends a demo of (with her own lyrics) into Melodifestivalen, the Swedish heats for the Eurovision contest. Much to Mona's delight, the song qualifies for the finals. Mona's new-found fame takes her to unexpected places, including a TV interview, and an invitation to lunch at Berns. Throughout, the film, though, Mona is torn as to whether she should reveal that she was not in fact the only writer of her song, and thus risk losing the public's support.

== Music ==
The film features several songs by well-known Swedish singers, such as "If Life Was a Song", performed by Carola Häggkvist, "I Believe in Miracles" performed by Lena Philipsson and "Kärleksikonen" performed by Regina Lund.

The film also features the song "Aldrig ska jag sluta älska dig", originally performed by Helena Bergström, which was later released by Gardell, and "Handen på hjärtat" performed by Sofia Källgren. "Handen på hjärtat" was released on the soundtrack but was performed by Björn Kjellman feat. Salome.

== Cast and characters ==
- Helena Bergström as Mona
- Jonas Karlsson as David
- Björn Kjellman as Candy Darling
- Thomas Hanzon as Bosse
- Sissela Kyle as Woman at the employment office
- Katarina Ewerlöf as Moa, project manager
- Regina Lund as Sabina
- Douglas Johansson as Hairdresser
- Jessica Zandén as Woman at the café
- Frida Hallgren as TV engineer
