= Du är alltid en del utav mej (album) =

Studio album by Henrik Åberg
- Released: March 1996
- Genre: Rock
- Label: Big Bag

Henrik Åberg chronology
Du är alltid en del utav mej (1996)	Hemma igen (1997)

Du är alltid en del utav mej is the debut studio album by Henrik Åberg, released in 1996.

== Track listing ==
1. Bara en clown (Lasse Holm, Ingela Forsman)
2. There Goes My Everything (Dallas Frazier)
3. Jim (Red Foley, Gert Lengstrand)
4. Paralyzed (Otis Blackwell, Elvis Presley, Gert Lengstrand)
5. Love Me Tender (Elvis Presley, Vera Matson)
6. Du är alltid en del utav mej (Lasse Holm, Lasse Berghagen)
7. I Love You Because (Leon Payne)
8. He'll Have to Go (Joe Allison, Audrey Allison, Rose-Marie)
9. Blue Hawaii (Leo Robin, Ralph Rainger)
10. Mannen vid havet (Michael Saxell, Ingela Forsman)
11. Var mej nära (Lars Moberg, Lasse Berghagen)

== Charts ==
Chart (1996)	Peak position
Sweden (Sverigetopplistan)	25
