= Högt över havet =

Single by Arja Saijonmaa
- A-side: "Högt över havet"
- B-side: "Millioner rosor"
- Released: 1987
- Genre: Pop, schlager
- Label: Mariann
- Songwriter: Lasse Holm

"Högt över havet" is a song written by Lasse Holm, and performed by Arja Saijonmaa at Melodifestivalen 1987. The song also won the OGAE Second Chance Contest.

The single peaked at 14th position at the Swedish singles chart. The song also charted at Svensktoppen, where it stayed for 11 weeks during the period of 12 April-21 June 1987, topping the chart in the first week.

== Other recordings ==
- Thorleifs recorded the song on the album "Saxgodingar 4" in 1998.
- Heavy metal band Black Ingvars recorded the song on the 1998 album "Schlager Metal".

== Charts ==
Chart (1987)	Peak position
Sweden (Sverigetopplistan)	14
