= Earth and Fire (album) =

Studio album by Earth and Fire
- Released: September 1970
- Recorded: 1969–1970
- Genres: Progressive rock; symphonic rock
- Length: 45:55
- Producer: Fred Haayen

Earth and Fire chronology
Earth and Fire (1970)	Song of the Marching Children (1971)

Earth and Fire is the first studio album by the Dutch rock and pop band Earth and Fire. Released in 1970, the album contains the first single "Seasons" written by Golden Earring singer and guitarist George Kooymans. Other singles released are "Ruby Is the One" and "Wild and Exciting".

The cover of the UK release was created by English artist Roger Dean.

== Track listing ==
1. Wild and Exciting (Chris and Gerard Koerts) – 4:06
2. Twilight Dreamer (C. Koerts) – 4:18
3. Ruby Is the One (C. Koerts) – 3:28
4. You know the Way (G. Koerts) – 3:48
5. Vivid Shady Land (C. Koerts) – 4:13
6. 21st Century Show (C. Koerts) – 4:16
7. Seasons (George Kooymans) – 4:09
8. Love Quivers (C. and G. Koerts) – 7:37
9. What's Your Name (C. and G. Koerts) – 3:38
10. Hazy Paradise (bonus track) – 3:47
11. Mechanical Lover (bonus track) – 2:15

== Personnel ==
- Jerney - lead vocals, electronics
- Chris Koerts - guitar, backing vocals
- Gerard Koerts - piano, organ
- Hans Ziech - bass
- Ton van der Kleij - drums, percussion
- Roger Dean - design and artwork (UK release)
