= Blender (band) =

- Origin: Hudiksvall, Sweden
- Genres: Dansband music
- Years active: March 2002- present

Blender is a Swedish dansband, founded in March 2002 by Lasse Lundberg. Soon, the band became a full-time dansband and since then has played all over Sweden.

In 2007 they won the Guldklaven award in the "Album of the Year" and they have also got several other awards.

In 2009 the single "Ingen ingenting" was qualified to Sveriges Radio P4's so called B rotation list, which guaranteed it a lot of airplay over the radio each week. On 12 December 2009 the band participated with The Playtones, Titanix, Casanovas and Bhonus in the last of the qualification sets in Dansbandskampen and performed two songs: "Dag efter dag" and "Hold Me Now". Then they also played in the final, but did not win the contest.

In 2011 the band scored a success with the album Ingen utan mig, reaching fourth position at Sverigetopplistan.

== Members ==
- Lasse Lundberg (1968) - drums, vocals
- Maria Persson (1980) - vocals
- Magnus Åkerlund (1974) - guitar
- - 2008 Urban (1971) - keyboard, vocals
- Rikard André (1971) - keyboard, vocals
- Robert Norberg (1985) - bass

== Discography ==
=== Albums ===
- Live i studio - 2002
- Live i studio 2 - 2004
- Alla essen på handen - 2007
- Live i studio 3 - 2008
- Välkommen in - 2009
- Ingen utan mig - 2011
- På väg till Malung - 2012 (CD+DVD)
- Live i studio 4 - 2012

=== Singles ===
- Head over Heels - 2003
- It Must Be Love - 2004
- Du tänder alla ljus - 2006

=== Awards ===
- 2003 - Lasse Lundberg - Guldklaven Drummer of the Year
- 2003 - Blender - nominated for Newcomer of the Year
- 2004 - Andreas Westman - nominated for Bassist of the Year
- 2005 - Blender - nominated for Dansband of the Year
- 2005 - Magnus Åkerlund - Guldklaven Guitarist of the Year
- 2006 - Ulf Härnström - Guldklaven Keyboardist of the Year
- 2007 - Maria Persson - nominated for Singer of the Year
- 2007 - Blender - Guldklaven Album of the Year (Alla essen på handen)
- 2009 - Robert Norberg - nominated for Bassist of the Year
