= Chips (album) =

Studio album by Chips
- Released: June 1980
- Genre: Country pop, schlager
- Label: Mariann Records
- Producer: Lasse Holm, Torgny Söderberg

Chips chronology
Chips (1980)	Having a Party (1982)

Chips is a studio album from Swedish group Chips. It was released in June 1980, as the group's debut album, and peaked at number 22 on the Swedish Albums Chart.

== Track listing ==
=== Side A ===
1. A Little Bit of Loving
2. Sympathy
3. Weekend
4. So Long Sally
5. Starry Night
6. Paris

=== Side B ===
1. I Remember High School
2. Sensation
3. Don't Cry no More
4. It Takes More Than a Minute
5. In Arabia
6. Can't Get over You

== Charts ==
Chart (1980)	Peak position
Swedish Albums (Sverigetopplistan)	22
