= Having a Party =

Having a Party may refer to:

- Having a Party (Chips album), 1982
- Having a Party (Pointer Sisters album), 1977
- "Having a Party" (Sam Cooke song), 1962
- "Having a Party" (The Osmonds song), 1975
