= Jag vill leva i Europa =

Song by Jan Hammarlund

from the album Järnvägsräls
- Language: Swedish
- Released: 1982
- Genre: progg
- Label: Silence
- Songwriter: Jan Hammarlund

Jag vill leva i Europa is a song written by Jan Hammarlund, recorded by him on the 1982 album Järnvägsräls.

Arja Saijonmaa recorded the song on her 1987 album Högt över havet and her recording charted at Svensktoppen for 14 weeks between 17 May and 1 November 1987, peaking at second position. In 1987 it was also recorded by Jan Hammarlund in French, as "Je veux vivre en Europe".

Kenneth Lindholm also recorded the song in 1987.

Euskefeurat has also recorded the song, with other lyrics, called "Jag vill städa i Europa".

== Theme ==
The song lyrics, dealing with the universal message of peace, describe four tourists from Sweden travelling by car across various states in Europe.

=== Version 1 ===
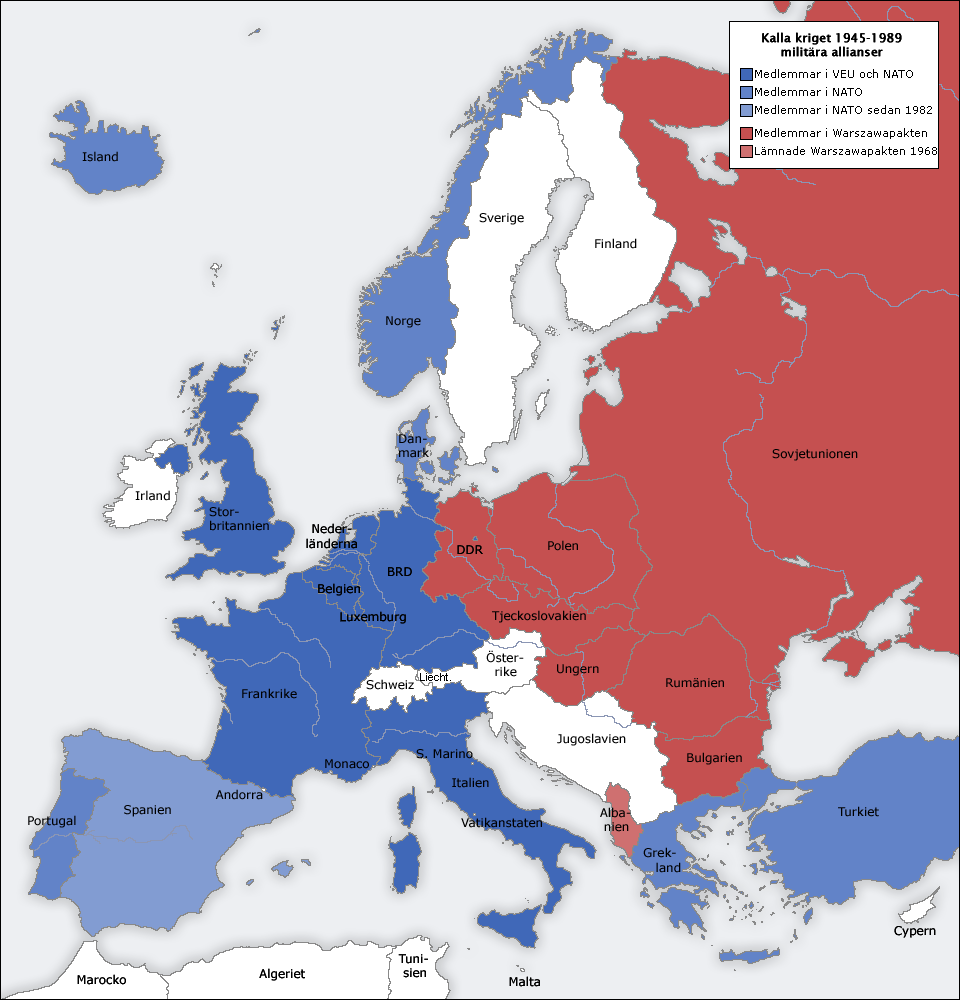
The original 1982 version's lyrics are inspired by the Cold War.

When the original version came out in 1982, the world was living in the shadows of the Cold War. A threatening nuclear weapon war was the main theme.

=== Version 2 ===
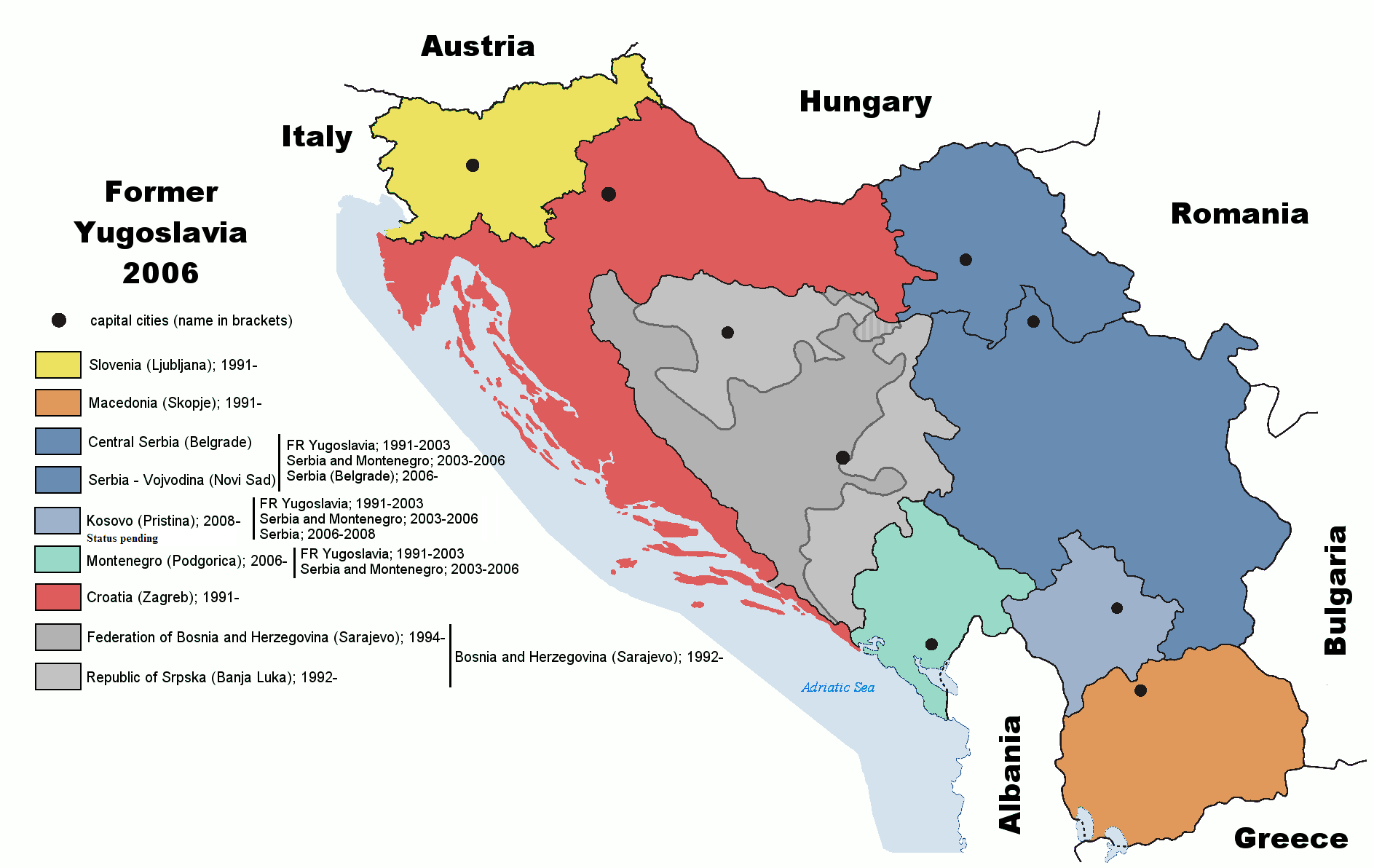
In the 1990s, lyrics were changed to better fit into that era, with ethnic conflicts and streams of refugees.

A 1991 Jan Hammarlund version was changed, to better fit in the era, with a Europe where several communist governments had been overthrown. At the time, shatterings and civil wars between ethnic groups and religions affected Europe. Refugee streams became a main theme.
