= James Fair =

James Fair may refer to:

- James G. Fair (1831–1894), U.S. senator and businessman
- James Fair (field hockey) (born 1981), English field hockey player
- James R. Fair (1920–2010), American chemical engineer
