= Du är alltid en del utav mej =

"Du är alltid en del av mej"

Single by Henrik Åberg

from the album Du är alltid en del utav mej
- Released: 1996
- Genre: Pop, schlager
- Label: Big Bag
- Songwriters: Lasse Holm (music), Lasse Berghagen (lyrics)

"Du är alltid en del av mej" is a song with lyrics by Lars Berghagen and music by Lasse Holm. The song was performed by Henrik Åberg at Melodifestivalen 1996. The song's lyrics describe a person who has lost a loved one. The song has become common at funerals, since it can be interpreted that the you-person has died.

At Melodifestivalen, the song was knocked out from the first voting round, but at Svensktoppen it stayed for 36 weeks between 23 March-23 November 1996, topping the chart several times. It meant Melodifestivalen record for a Svensktoppen song, counted as 2006 contest. The record wasn't broken until 2008-2009 with Sanna Nielsen's Empty Room.

== Charts ==
Chart (1996)	Peak position
Sweden (Sverigetopplistan)	12
