= The Very Best of dansbandshårdrock =

Greatest hits album by Black Ingvars
- Released: 2000
- Genre: heavy metal
- Label: Mariann

Black Ingvars chronology
Kids Superhits (2000)	The Very Best of dansbandshårdrock (2000)	Sjung och var glad med Black-Ingvars 2 (2001)

The Very Best of dansbandshårdrock is a 2000 compilation album from Swedish heavy metal band Black Ingvars.

== Track listing ==
1. Inget stoppar oss nu
2. Whole Lotta Engberg
3. Mitt eget blue Hawaii
4. Leende guldbruna ögon
5. Eloise
6. Karlstads collage
7. Två mörka ögon
8. Tio tusen röda rosor
9. Mjölnarens Irene
10. Gråt inga tårar
11. Flamingo medley
12. Du gav bara löften
13. Sofia dansar go-go
14. Natten har tusen ögon
15. Dra dit pepparn växer
16. Tusen bitar
17. Ljus och värme
18. De sista ljuva åren
19. Vem tänder stjärnorna
20. Vindens melodi
