= Mitt julalbum =

Studio album by Henrik Åberg
- Released: 12 November 2014
- Genre: Christmas
- Label: Radon

Henrik Åberg chronology
Elvis Forever: A Tribute to the King (2011)	Mitt julalbum (2014)

Mitt julalbum is a Henrik Åberg Christmas album released on 12 November 2014.

== Track listing ==
1. Jag kommer hem igen till julen
2. Blue Christmas
3. On a Snowy Christmas Night
4. Christmas is Here
5. När ljusen ska tändas därhemma (When It's Lamp Lighting Time in the Valley)
6. White Christmas
7. Winter Wonderland
8. Silent Night (Stille Nacht, heilige Nacht)
9. When the Snow is on the Roses
10. Here Comes Canta Claus (Right Down Santa Claus Lane)
11. In My Fathers House (with Ray Walker from The Jordanaires)
12. O helga natt (Cantique de Noël)

== Charts ==
Chart (2014)	Peak position
Swedish Albums (Sverigetopplistan)	14
