= Heaven Metal =

Studio album by Black Ingvars
- Released: 1999
- Genre: Christian, heavy metal
- Length: circa 41 minutes
- Label: Independent Entertainment

Black Ingvars chronology
Schlager Metal (1998)	Heaven Metal (1999)	Kids Superhits (2000)

Heaven Metal is a 1999 album from Swedish heavy metal band Black Ingvars. consisting of recordings of Christian songs.

== Track listing ==
1. "Gospel medley" (with Runar Sögaard)
2. "Pärleporten"
3. "Ovan där" ("We Will Understand Him Better By and By")
4. "Den blomstertid nu kommer"
5. "Han är min sång och min glädje" ("There Goes My Everything")
6. "Där rosor aldrig dör" ("Where Roses Never Fade")
7. "Jag har hört om en stad ovan molnen"
8. "Guldgrävarsången"
9. "Jag är en ung godtemplartjej"
10. "Barnatro"
11. "Bygg upp en himmel"

== Chart positions ==
Chart (1999)	Peak position
Sweden	22
