= Håkan Södergren =

Swedish ice hockey player and color commentator

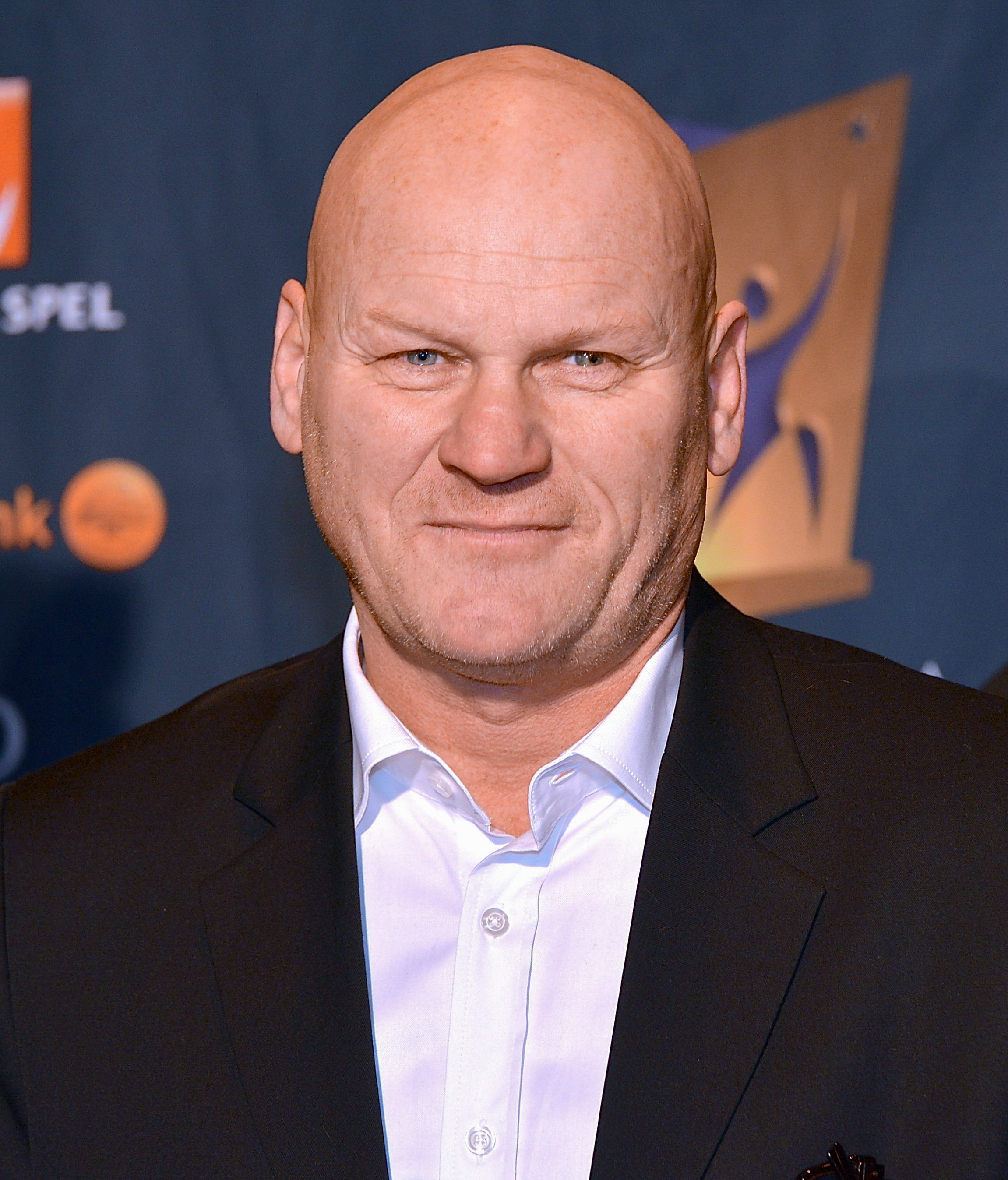
- Södergren at the Swedish Sports Awards in January 2013
- Born: 14 June 1959 (age 66) Sigtuna, Sweden
- Height: 5 ft 9 in (175 cm)
- Weight: 176 lb (80 kg; 12 st 8 lb)
- Position: Left wing
- Shot: Right
- Played for: Djurgårdens IF; Huddinge IK
- National team: Sweden
- Playing career: 1977–1991

Håkan Södergren
Medal record

Men's ice hockey

Olympic Games
Bronze medal – third place	1988 Calgary	Team
Bronze medal – third place	1984 Sarajevo	Team

World Championships
Gold medal – first place	1987	Team
Silver medal – second place	1986	Team

Elitserien
Gold medal – first place	1991	Team
Gold medal – first place	1990	Team
Gold medal – first place	1989	Team
Silver medal – second place	1985	Team
Gold medal – first place	1983	Team
Silver medal – second place	1979	Team

Karl Håkan Södergren (born 14 June 1959) is a retired professional ice hockey player, often a recurring color commentator in Viasat's ice hockey broadcast productions.

== Playing career ==
Södergren played for Djurgårdens IF Hockey in the Swedish elite league Elitserien during his entire professional career, winning the Swedish Championship four times. He finished his active playing career with Huddinge IK in the second tier in the Swedish league structure.

Internationally he played in 162 games with the Swedish national team, winning gold at the 1987 World Ice Hockey Championships and bronze at the 1984 and 1988 Winter Olympics. He was awarded the Stora Grabbars Märke (no. 125) and the Guldpucken (Elitserien Player of the Year) in 1987.

Djurgården has retired number 22 in his honor.

== Off the ice ==
For the 1989 World Ice Hockey Championships Södergren recorded and sang solo in the Swedish national team's fight song "Nu tar vi dom" (Swedish for "let's get them"). He is residing in Oslo, Norway, with his two sons.

== Awards ==
- Elitserien Silver Medal in 1979 and 1985.
- Swedish Champion with Djurgårdens IF Hockey in 1983, 1989, 1990 and 1991.
- Awarded the Guldpucken (Elitserien Player of the Year) in 1987.
- Bronze medal at the Winter Olympics in 1984 and 1988.
- Silver medal at the Ice Hockey World Championships in 1986.
- Gold medal at the Ice Hockey World Championships in 1987.

== Records ==
- Elitserien record for penalty minutes in season 1983–84 (74)

== Career statistics ==
=== Regular season and playoffs ===
			Regular season					Playoffs
Season	Team	League	GP	G	A	Pts	PIM	GP	G	A	Pts	PIM
1977–78	Djurgårdens IF	SEL	12	0	3	3	0	—	—	—	—	—
1978–79	Djurgårdens IF	SEL	16	4	3	7	6	2	0	0	0	0
1979–80	Djurgårdens IF	SEL	28	5	9	14	22	—	—	—	—	—
1980–81	Djurgårdens IF	SEL	35	12	10	22	46	—	—	—	—	—
1981–82	Djurgårdens IF	SEL	33	6	11	17	57	—	—	—	—	—
1982–83	Djurgårdens IF	SEL	35	14	22	36	62	7	4	5	9	22
1983–84	Djurgårdens IF	SEL	29	5	19	24	74	4	2	0	2	18
1984–85	Djurgårdens IF	SEL	35	11	16	27	42	8	3	5	8	10
1985–86	Djurgårdens IF	SEL	33	11	19	30	38	—	—	—	—	—
1986–87	Djurgårdens IF	SEL	32	14	19	33	60	2	0	2	2	2
1987–88	Djurgårdens IF	SEL	32	17	24	41	38	3	0	0	0	0
1988–89	Djurgårdens IF	SEL	29	13	11	24	36	8	4	5	9	6
1989–90	Djurgårdens IF	SEL	31	10	15	25	30	5	1	2	3	4
1990–91	Djurgårdens IF	SEL	40	9	13	22	26	7	0	0	0	0
1991–92	Huddinge IK	SWE II	33	13	24	37	52	—	—	—	—	—
SEL totals			420	131	194	325	537	46	14	19	33	62

=== International ===
Year	Team	Event	GP	G	A	Pts	PIM
1977	Sweden	EJC	5	—	—	—	—
1979	Sweden	WJC	6	0	6	6	6
1983	Sweden	WC	10	0	1	1	24
1984	Sweden	OG	6	3	2	5	6
1985	Sweden	WC	9	3	2	5	4
1986	Sweden	WC	10	2	8	10	2
1987	Sweden	WC	10	3	6	9	12
1987	Sweden	CC	6	0	2	2	2
1988	Sweden	OG	8	4	4	8	6
1989	Sweden	WC	10	1	1	2	2
Senior totals			69	16	26	42	58

Preceded by Tommy Samuelsson	Guldpucken; 1987	Succeeded by Bo Berglund
