= James R. Fair =

American chemical engineer

- Born: James Rutherford Fair; October 14, 1920; Charleston, Missouri
- Died: October 11, 2010 (aged 89); Austin, Texas
- Education: The Citadel Georgia Institute of Technology; University of Michigan University of Texas at Austin
- Spouse: Merle Innis (m. 1950)
- Children: 3
- Scientific career
- Workplaces: Monsanto Company; University of Texas at Austin
- Doctoral advisor: Howard F. Rase

James Rutherford Fair (October 14, 1920 – October 11, 2010) was an American chemical engineer. His professional career included 33 years working in a variety of industrial positions, primarily for Monsanto Company.

In 1979, he shifted to academia, joining the University of Texas at Austin School of Chemical Engineering, where he founded the Separations Research Program, which he headed from 1982 until 1996. Although he officially retired in 1992, he remained active as professor emeritus until his death in 2010.

He was particularly noted for his research into separation technologies, especially distillation and extraction. He was a registered Professional Engineer in Missouri and Texas. He published more than 200 technical papers and book chapters.

== Early life and education ==
James Fair was born in Charleston, Missouri, on October 14, 1920, to James R. Fair and Georgie C. Fair. The family also lived in Tonganoxie, Kansas and Little Rock, Arkansas. At age eighteen, he enrolled at The Citadel. In 1940, he transferred to Georgia Tech, where he earned a B.S. degree in chemical engineering in 1942. He earned a master's degree at the University of Michigan in 1949 and a Ph.D. at the University of Texas in Austin in 1954.

As a boy, Fair developed a lifelong fascination with railroad trains. He collected books and other memorabilia, and even wrote two books about railroad operations. After his death, the family donated his large collection to the Temple Railroad and Heritage Museum in Temple, Texas.

Fair met and married Merle Innis (1924-2014) while working in Texas City, Texas. Their wedding occurred January 14, 1950. They had three children.

== Industrial career ==
During World War II, Fair served in several capacities with the government-sponsored high explosives and synthetic rubber programs. After the war, he joined Monsanto Company, where he worked in research, process design, manufacturing technical services and commercial development. Initially, he was a junior engineer in St. Louis, but was transferred to the Monsanto plant at Texas City, Texas, just before the Texas City Disaster largely destroyed the facility where he worked. Though injured, he survived the explosion and subsequent fires.

Monsanto granted Fair a one-year leave of absence to attend University of Michigan and earn his master's degree. He then returned to work in Texas City. In 1952, he took an unpaid leave to study at the University of Texas in Austin (UT). He studied under Dr. Howard F. Rase, earned his doctoral degree in 1954, then went to work for two years for Shell Development Company in Emeryville, California.

Fair returned to Monsanto in 1956 as a Research Section Leader at the corporate research laboratory in Dayton, Ohio. In 1961, he was transferred to the corporate headquarters in St. Louis. His career continued to progress there. During this time, he became well known in his profession as an expert in process design and especially the design of equipment for fractional distillation and extraction. He also represented Monsanto in activities of Fractionation Research, Inc., an industry-sponsored research group. His final position at Monsanto was Director of Corporate Technology.

== Academic career ==
Fair had long maintained a great interest in chemical engineering education. While working for Monsanto in St. Louis, Missouri, he also served as Affiliate Professor of Chemical Engineering for the McKelvey School of Engineering at Washington University in St. Louis between 1964 and 1977. In 1979, the University of Texas at Austin Department of Chemical Engineering offered him the Ernest and Virginia Cockrell Chair in Engineering. He accepted the offer and moved to Austin. In 1985, he was appointed to the John J. McKetta Centennial Chair in Engineering.

In 1983, Fair established the UT Separations Research Program (SRP), a consortium of industry and academia, and served as head of the program until 1996. It had as many as 40 industrial sponsors at one time. Fair also built a pilot plant for separations research projects. The SRP evolved into the Process Science and Technology Center, which has expanded into additional areas of engineering.

Fair taught courses for students ranging from freshmen to upper-level graduates, enriching the curriculum with real-life examples from his industrial experience. He was credited with supervising the research for 21 masters theses and 22 doctoral dissertations.

Although he officially retired at age 72, he continued to work regularly as professor emeritus for the rest of his life. He died October 11, 2010, in Austin, Texas, three days before his 90th birthday, survived by his wife (Merle) two children, and extended family. One of James and Merle Fair's children predeceased them. Merle Innis Fair died in 2014.

== Honors ==
- Fellow of the American Institute of Chemical Engineers (AIChE) (since 1971)
- Member of the National Academy of Engineering (1974)
- Honorary Doctorates from
  - Washington University (1977)
  - Clemson University (1987)
- Other awards
  - William H. Walker Award (AIChE) (1973)
  - Chemical Engineering Practice Award (AIChE) (1975)
  - Founders Award (AIChE) (1976)
  - Distinguished Engineering Graduate from University of Texas (1976)
  - Joe J. King Professional Engineering Achievement Award (1977)
  - Malcolm Pruitt Award from the Council for Chemical Research (1991)
  - Gold Medallion Award from the American Society for Engineering Education (1993)
  - Separations Science and Technology Award from the American Chemical Society (1993)
  - Engineering Hall of Fame at Georgia Tech (1994)
