= The Night (Scooter song) =

2003 single by Scooter

Single by Scooter

from the album The Stadium Techno Experience
- B-side: "Cordyline"
- Released: 26 May 2003
- Length: 3:24
- Label: Sheffield Tunes
- Songwriters: Lino Nicolosi; Barbara Addoms; H.P. Baxxter; Rick J. Jordan; Jay Frog; Jens Thele
- Producer: Scooter

Scooter singles chronology
"Weekend!" (2003)	"The Night" (2003)	"Maria (I Like It Loud)" (2003)

Music video
- "The Night" on YouTube

"The Night" is a song by German hard dance band Scooter. It heavily interpolates "The Night" by Valerie Dore. The song was released as the second single from Scooter's ninth studio album, The Stadium Techno Experience, on 26 May 2003. Upon its release, "The Night" reached number eight in Hungary, number 10 in Germany, and reached the top 20 in Austria, Denmark, Finland, Sweden, and the United Kingdom.

== Track listings ==
German maxi-CD single

1. "The Night" (radio edit) – 3:24
2. "The Night" (club mix) – 5:52
3. "The Night" (Starsplash remix) – 3:54
4. "The Night" (Langenhagen remix) – 6:02
5. "Cordyline" – 3:46
6. Scooter media navigator

European CD single

1. "The Night" (radio edit) – 3:24
2. "The Night" (extended) – 4:57

European 12-inch single

1. "The Night" (club mix) – 5:47
2. "The Night" (extended) – 4:57
3. "The Night" (Starsplash remix) – 6:09
4. "The Night" (Langenhagen remix) – 7:05

UK cassette single

1. "The Night" (radio edit) – 3:22
2. "The Night" (LMC remix) – 4:47

UK CD single

1. "The Night" (radio edit) – 3:22
2. "The Night" (LMC mix) – 4:47
3. "The Night" (Almighty mix) – 7:10
4. "The Night" (video)

UK 12-inch single

1. "The Night" (LMC remix) – 4:47
2. "The Night" (Almighty remix) – 7:10
3. "The Night" (Starsplash remix) – 6:09

Australian CD single

1. "The Night" (radio edit) – 3:24
2. "The Night" (club mix) – 5:52
3. "The Night" (Starsplash remix) – 3:54
4. "The Night" (Langenhagen remix) – 6:02
5. "Cordyline" – 3:46

== Charts ==
Chart (2003)	Peak position
Australia (ARIA)	85
Austria (Ö3 Austria Top 40)	12
Belgium (Ultratop 50 Flanders)	50
Denmark (Tracklisten)	15
Europe (Eurochart Hot 100)	32
Finland (Suomen virallinen lista)	14
Germany (GfK)	10
Hungary (Single Top 40)	8
Ireland (IRMA)	30
Ireland Dance (IRMA)	4
Netherlands (Single Top 100)	26
Romania (Romanian Top 100)	28
Scotland Singles (OCC)	10
Sweden (Sverigetopplistan)	14
Switzerland (Schweizer Hitparade)	34
UK Singles (OCC)	16
UK Dance (OCC)	20
UK Indie (OCC)	5

== Release history ==
Region	Date	Format(s)	Label(s)	Ref.
Germany	26 May 2003	CD	Sheffield Tunes	
United Kingdom	23 June 2003	12-inch vinyl; CD; cassette	Sheffield Tunes	
