= Henrik Åberg =

Swedish singer

- Born: 1976 (age 49–50)
- Genres: Rock, schlager
- Occupation: Singer
- Years active: 1995–present

Henrik Åberg (born 1976), is a Swedish singer who won TV4's Sikta mot stjärnorna in 1995, imitating Elvis Presley performing the song "Blue Hawaii", and scoring chart successes in Sweden.

He also represented Sweden in the European final of European Soundmix Show, on 13 April 1996 in Amsterdam, performing Love Me Tender. At Melodifestivalen 1996 he participated with the song Du är alltid en del utav mej written by Lasse Berghagen and Lasse Holm. While the song did not reach the final, it became a Svensktoppen hit for 36 weeks.

Henrik Åberg then went on a summer tour with an own band, where ABBA bassist Rutger Gunnarsson was Kapellmeister. Between 1996 and 1998 he scored totally five Sensktoppen hits. In 2001, "En dans i morgonsolen" with Martinez charted for 17 weeks at Svenskoppen.

== Discography ==
=== Albums ===
- Du är alltid en del utav mej (1996, Sony Music)
- Hemma igen (1997, Sony Music)
- Allt jag har (2003, Annie Records och City Music)
- Elvis Forever: A Tribute to the King (2011, with Jack Baymoore)
- Mitt julalbum (2014)

== Svensktoppen songs ==
- Du är alltid en del utav mej - 1996
- Bara en clown - 1996
- Vi ska aldrig ta farväl - 1997
- Jenny och jag - 1998
- Hemma igen - 1998
- En dans i morgonsolen - 2001 (with Martinez)
