= Ciao ciao Italia =

Single by After Shave
- A-side: "Ciao ciao Italia"
- B-side: "Ciao ciao Italia" ("instrumental")
- Released: 1990
- Genre: popular music
- Label: Big Bag
- Songwriters: Lasse Holm; Eddie Oliva

"Ciao ciao Italia" is a song used as the anthem for the Sweden national team during the 1990 FIFA World Cup in Italy. The song was written by Lasse Holm and Eddie Oliva and performed by the Swedish band After Shave.

The single peaked at 12th position at the Swedish singles chart. The song also stayed at Svensktoppen for four weeks between 20 May and 10 June 1990, peaking at second position.

== Track listing ==
1. Ciao ciao Italia
2. Ciao ciao Italia - instrumental

== Charts ==
Chart (1990)	Peak position
Sweden (Sverigetopplistan)	12
