= Atlantis (Earth and Fire album) =

Studio album by Earth and Fire
- Released: 1973
- Genre: Progressive rock
- Length: 33:35
- Label: Polydor

Earth and Fire chronology
Song of the Marching Children (1971)	Atlantis (1973)	To the World of the Future (1975)

Atlantis is a 1973 concept album by Dutch rock and pop band Earth and Fire. The first half of the album (Side 1 of the original vinyl pressing) comprises a suite based on the story of the greedy and corrupt island of Atlantis, which is ultimately destroyed by the four elements: earthquakes represent Earth, volcanoes represent Fire, volcanic gases represent Air and finally the island is inundated by Water.

== Track listing ==
Side one

1. "Atlantis" – (Chris Koerts, Gerard Koerts, Hans Ziech) – 16:22
  1. "Prelude"
  2. "Prologue (Don't Know)"
  3. "Rise and Fall (Under a Cloudy Sky)"
  4. "Theme of Atlantis"
  5. "The Threat (Suddenly)"
  6. "Destructions (Rumbling from Inside the Earth)"
  7. "Epilogue (Don't Know)"

Side two

2. "Maybe Tomorrow, Maybe Tonight" – (G. Koerts, Ziech, C. Koerts) – 3:12
3. "Interlude" – (G. Koerts, C. Koerts) – 1:57
4. "Fanfare" – (Ton van der Kleji, Ziech, G. Koerts, C. Koerts) – 6:03
5. "Theme from Atlantis" – (C. Koerts, G. Koerts) – 1:50
6. "Love Please Close the Door" – (G. Koerts, Ziech, C. Koerts) – 4:11

== Personnel ==
- Jerney Kaagman – lead vocals
- Chris Koerts – electric and acoustic guitars, backing vocals
- Gerard Koerts – organ, backing vocals, Mellotron, piano, synthesizer, flute, virginal
- Hans Ziech – bass
- Ton van der Kleij – drums, percussion
