= Schlager Metal =

Studio album by Black Ingvars
- Released: 1998
- Genre: heavy metal, schlager
- Length: circa 42 minutes
- Label: Independent Entertainment

Black Ingvars chronology
Sjung och var glad med Black-Ingvars (1998)	Schlager Metal (1998)	Heaven Metal (1999)

Schlager Metal is a 1998 album by Swedish heavy metal band Black Ingvars. On the album, they cover Melodifestivalen songs in heavy metal version. However, the first song, "Cherie", was their own and they performed it at the Swedish Melodifestivalen 1998, where it finished fifth.

== Track listing ==
1. "Cherie"
2. "Bang en boomerang"
3. "Dansa i neon"
4. "ABC"
5. "Främling"
6. "Diggi-Loo Diggi-Ley"
7. "Fångad av en stormvind"
8. "Waterloo"
9. "Växeln hallå"
10. "La det swinge"
11. "Det börjar verka kärlek, banne mig"
12. "Högt över havet"

== Chart positions ==
Chart (1998)	Peak position
Sweden	6
