= Handen på hjärtat =

Single by Sofia Källgren

from the album Handen på hjärtat
- A-side: "Handen på hjärtat"
- B-side: "Längtans vind"
- Released: 1990
- Genre: Schlager
- Label: Big Bag
- Songwriters: Lasse Holm (music); Ingela Forsman (lyrics)

"Handen på hjärtat" is a Swedish song by Lasse Holm (music) and Ingela Forsman (lyrics) performed by Sofia Källgren in Melodifestivalen 1990 and finished in 4th place. Källgren was backed up by three dancers wearing partially furry suits.

The song charted on Svensktoppen for 18 weeks 1 April to 7 October 1990, peaking at no 3.

== Cover by Björn Kjellman feat. Salome ==
Björn Kjellman feat. Salome performed a slow version with updated lyrics by Jesper Winge Leisner and Søs Fenger for the soundtrack of the 2000 film Livet är en schlager.
