= Främling (song) =

1983 song by Carola Häggkvist

Single by Carola Häggkvist

from the album Främling
- Language: Swedish
- B-side: "Liv"
- Released: 1983
- Genre: Schlager
- Length: 2:57 (album version)
- Label: Mariann
- Composer: Lasse Holm
- Lyricist: Monica Forsberg
- Producer: Lasse Holm

Carola Häggkvist singles chronology
"Främling" (1983)	"Hunger" (1983)

Eurovision Song Contest 1983 entry
- Country: Sweden
- Artist: Carola Häggkvist
- Language: Swedish
- Composer: Lasse Holm
- Lyricist: Monica Forsberg
- Conductor: Anders Ekdahl

Finals performance
- Final result: 3rd
- Final points: 126

Entry chronology
- ◄ "Dag efter dag" (1982)
- "Diggi-Loo Diggi-Ley" (1984) ►

"Främling" (Swedish pronunciation: [ˈfrɛ̂mːlɪŋ]; "Stranger") is a song recorded by Swedish singer Carola Häggkvist with music composed by Lasse Holm, Swedish lyrics written by Monica Forsberg, and arranged by Lennart Sjöholm. It represented Sweden in the Eurovision Song Contest 1983 held in Munich, after winning the Melodifestivalen 1983.

== Background ==
=== Conception ===
"Främling" was composed by Lasse Holm, with Swedish lyrics by Monica Forsberg, and was arranged by Lennart Sjöholm.

=== National Selection ===
"Främling" performed by a 16-year-old Carola Häggkvist competed in the 22nd edition of the Melodifestivalen, winning the competition. As this Melodifestivalen was organised by Sveriges Television (SVT) to select its song and performer for the 28th edition of the Eurovision Song Contest, the song became the Swedish entrant, and Carola the performer, for Eurovision. Kikki Danielsson was first asked to sing "Främling", but instead she chose "Varför är kärleken röd?", which finished second.

In addition to the Swedish language original version, Carola recorded the song in English –as "Love Isn't Love" with lyrics by Stuart Slater–, German –as "Fremder"–, Dutch –as "Je ogen hebben geen geheimen"–, and in an English-Dutch-Swedish version.

=== Eurovision ===
On 23 April 1983, the Eurovision Song Contest was held at the Rudi-Sedlmayer-Halle in Munich hosted by Bayerischer Rundfunk (BR) on behalf of ARD and broadcast live throughout the continent. Carloa performed "Främling" fourth on the evening, following the United Kingdom's "I'm Never Giving Up" by Sweet Dreams, and preceding Italy's entry "Per Lucia" by Riccardo Fogli. Anders Ekdahl conducted the event's live orchestra in the performance of the Swedish entry.

At the close of voting, it had received 126 points, placing third in a field of twenty.

== Chart history ==
"Främling" became a huge hit in Scandinavia, charting in Finland, Norway and Sweden, peaking at number six, one and five, respectively.

=== Weekly charts ===
Chart (1983)	Peak position
Denmark (IFPI)	1
Finland (Suomen virallinen lista)	6
Norway (VG-lista)	1
Sweden (Sverigetopplistan)	5

Chart (2023–2025)	Peak position
Sweden Heatseeker (Sverigetopplistan) "Främling 40" (with Nause)	8

== Legacy ==
- The Swedish heavy metal group Black Ingvars covered "Främling" on their 1998 album Schlager Metal.
- Finnish singer Meiju Suvas covered the song in Finnish, as "Muukalainen" (also translating as "stranger").
- The Norwegian free-jazz band Farmers Market has covered "Främling" on several concerts, and on their 2008 album Surfin' USSR. Farmers Market often use unusual time signatures, and their version of Främling switch between 11/16, 15/16, 7/16 and 13/16. The live version usually also has four bars of 2/4.
