= Nu tar vi dom =

Single by Håkan Södergren & Sweden men's national ice hockey team

from the album Hockey'n'Roll
- A-side: "Nu tar vi dom"
- B-side: "Här kommer grabbarna" (Lotta Engberg)
- Released: 1989
- Genre: schlager
- Label: Big Bag
- Songwriter: Lasse Holm

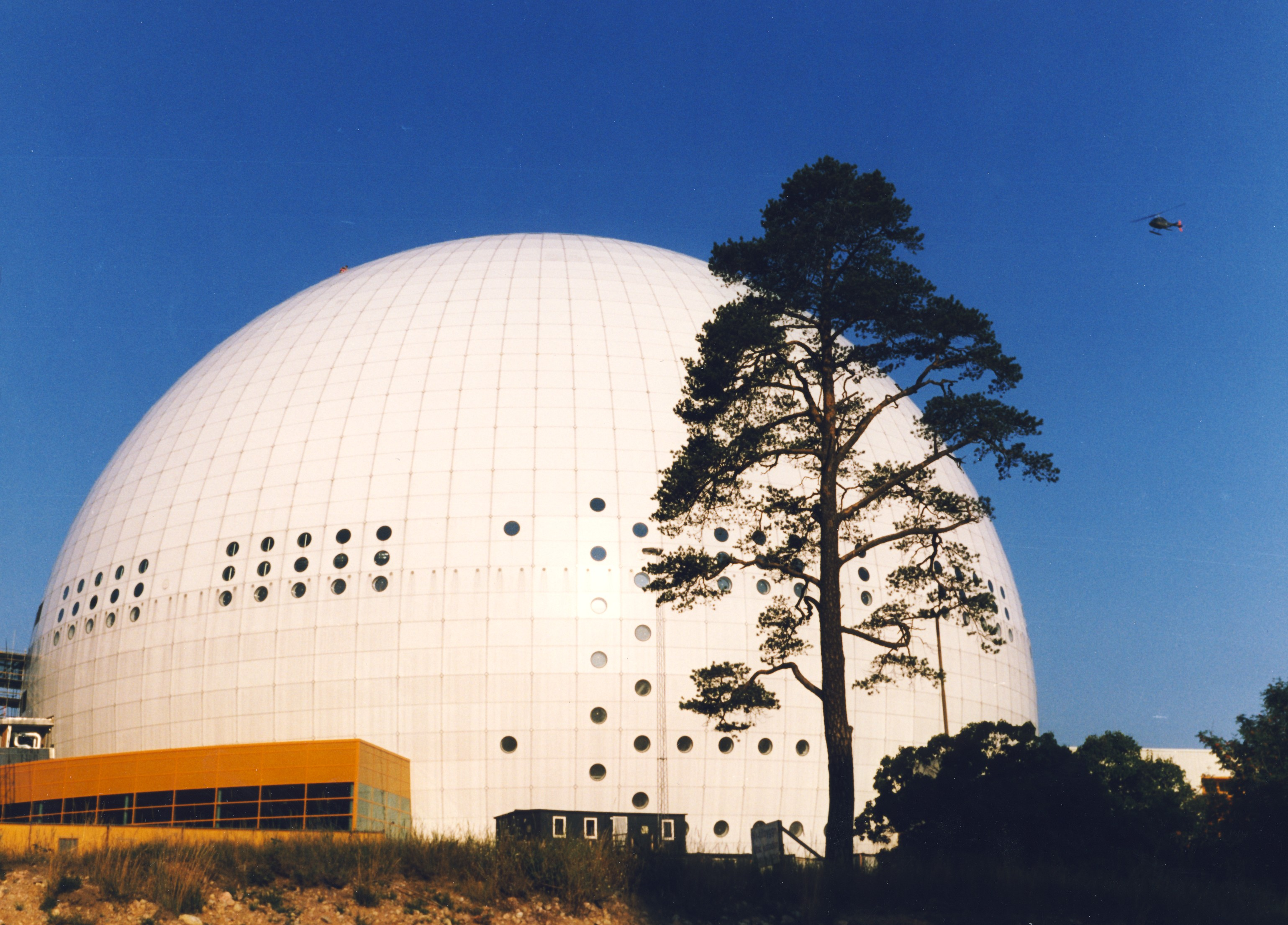
The Stockholm Globe Arena, where most games during the 1989 IIHF World Ice Hockey Championship were played.

"Nu tar vi dom" (alternate spelling: Nu tar vi dem), also known as "VM, nu är det hockeyfeber", is a song used as a anthem for the Sweden national team during the 1989 IIHF World Ice Hockey Championship in Sweden. Lasse Holm wrote both lyrics and music, and the vocals by the players, with Håkan Södergren featured as lead singer. The single peaked at second position on the Swedish singles chart. The B-side was "Här kommer grabbarna" by Lotta Engberg. The song became a Svensktoppen hit for seven weeks between 9 April-21 May 1989, and topped the chart between 16-30 April that year.

The song was originally written on demand following a meeting with insurance company Trygg Hansa and the Swedish Ice Hockey Association. The "Hockey!" chant during the beginning of the recording was performed by pupils from Lasse Holm's son's school class.

The song also appeared on the Hockey'n'Roll compilation album.

== Charts ==
Chart (1989)	Peak position
Sweden (Sverigetopplistan)	2
