= Mycke' mycke' mer =

Single by Chips

from the album Chips
- A-side: "God morgon"
- B-side: "Can't Get over You"
- Released: 1980
- Genre: Country pop, schlager
- Length: 3:29
- Label: Mariann
- Songwriters: Lasse Holm, Torgny Söderberg

Chips singles chronology
| "Mycke' mycke' mer" / "Can't Get over You"" (1980) | "God morgon" / "More Than a Minute" (1981) |

Mycke' mycke' mer, written by Lasse Holm and Torgny Söderberg, is a pop song in Swedish, which was performed by Swedish pop and country group Chips at the Swedish Melodifestivalen 1980, where it finished 4. it is a love song about being together, and was sung in a duet by Lasse Holm and Kikki Danielsson. The song was also recorded with lyrics in English, as A Little Bit of Loving.

== Single ==
The single "Mycke' mycke' mer" had "Can't Get over You" as B-side. The single as best reached the 16th place at the Swedish singles chart. The song was at Svensktoppen for nine weeks during the period 20 April-31 August 1980. On 4 May 1980, "Mycke' mycke' mer" for first time reached the top position at Svensktoppen.

== Chart performance ==
Sweden Top 20
| Week | 4 April 1980 | 18 April 1980 |
|---|---|---|
| Position | 16 | 17 |

== Cover versions ==
As a pause act during the Swedish Melodifestivalen 2010, Timo Räisänen & Hanna Eklöf performed the song.

== Chart positions ==
| Chart (1980) | Peak position |
|---|---|
| Sweden | 16 |
