= Earth and Fire =

Dutch rock band

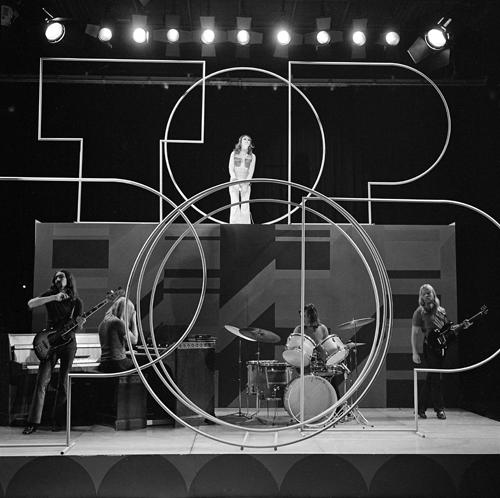
- Earth and Fire in 1971

Background information
- Origin: Netherlands
- Genres: Rock; pop; disco
- Years active: 1968–1983, 1987–1990
- Past members: Gerard Koerts; Chris Koerts; Hans Ziech; Cees Kalis; Manuela Berloth; Jerney Kaagman; Ton van der Kleij; Theo Hurts; Bert Ruiter; Ab Tamboer; Johan Slager; Ronnie Meyjes; Age Kat; Jons Pistoor; Ton Scherpenzeel; Mark Stoop

Earth and Fire was a Dutch rock and pop band. It was formed in the Netherlands by twin brothers Chris and Gerard Koerts, and was most popular in the early 1970s, after adding a female singer: Jerney Kaagman.

Earth and Fire's first eight singles were an uninterrupted string of top-5 hits in the Netherlands (1970-1974). After moving to pop, their biggest hit was "Weekend" (1979), a number one disco track in the Netherlands, Denmark, Germany, Portugal, and Switzerland. American copies were labeled as E & F [Polydor 2118].

== History ==
=== Early history: The Singing Twins and The Swinging Strings ===
Earth and Fire originated with the brothers Chris and Gerard Koerts from Voorschoten. As "The Singing Twins" they had made music for family and friends since 1960, achieving a breakthrough at a talent show in 1962, at which future bass player Hans Ziech was present. Ziech, at the time, was already interested in rock and roll and thought The Singing Twins mild and Jan & Kjeld-like. In 1963, influenced by beat music, they joined a local beat band, playing mostly instrumental music until early 1965. They changed their name to The Swinging Strings in 1965 and began singing and covering hits by the Beatles, the Byrds, and others. While they played all over the provinces of North and South Holland, they rarely performed in their area as The Hague had its scene of beat bands. By the end of 1966, however, they had won a few talent shows near their hometown, had a fan club with over 250 members, and had drawn the attention of radio DJ Willem van Kooten.

=== Opus Gainfull, transition to Earth and Fire ===
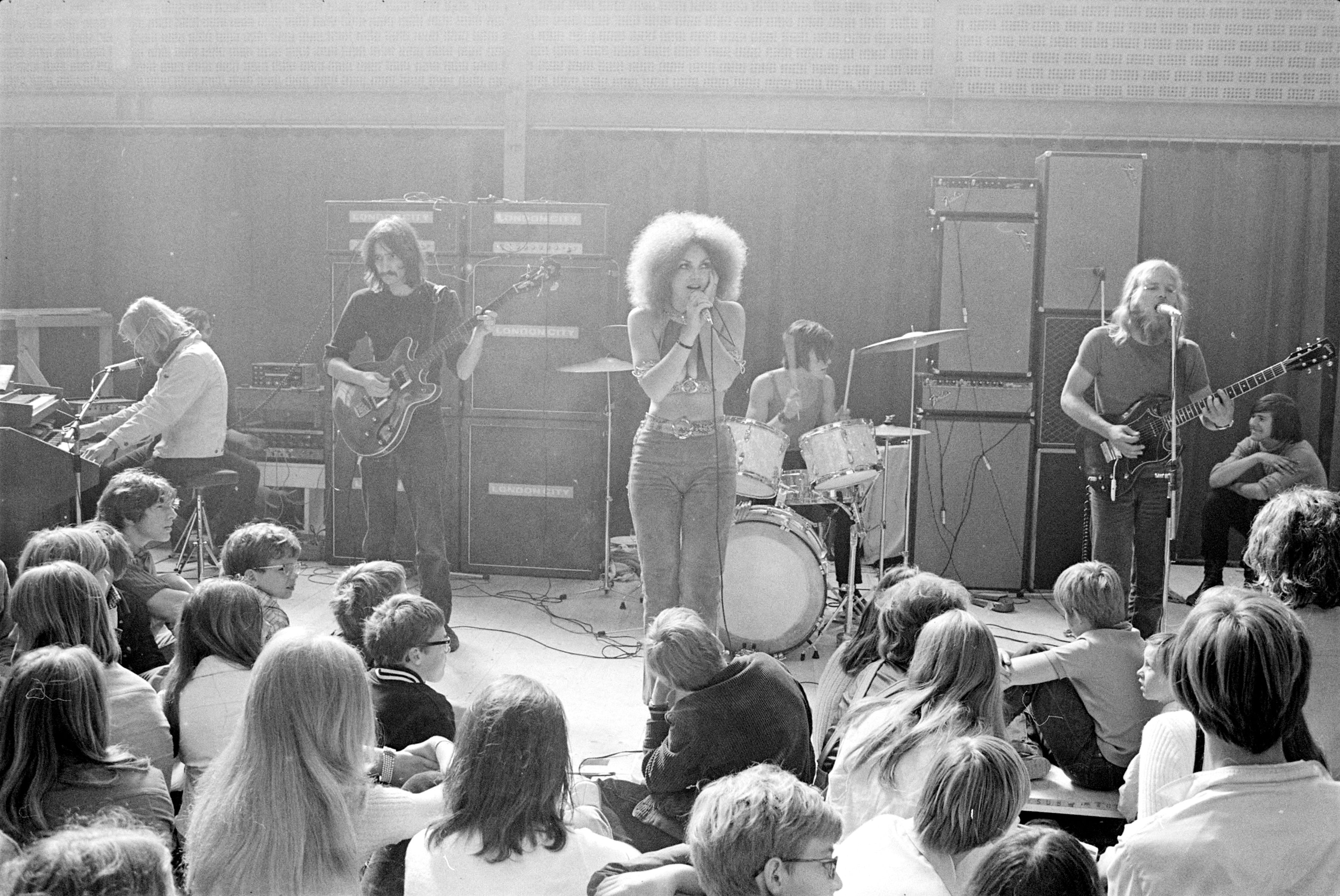
Performance Earth & Fire, June 1970

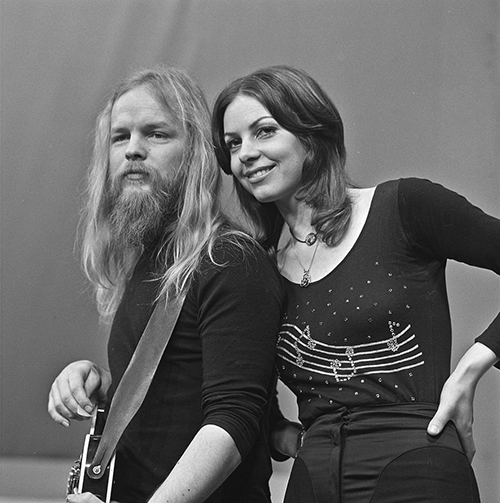
Chris Koerts (left) and Jerney Kaagman of Earth and Fire on TopPop television program, 1973

By 1967, the Koerts brothers were dissatisfied with playing cover music and were looking to increase the technical level of their music. Somewhat abruptly, according to the other members, they broke up the Strings and renamed the band Opus Gainfull, and were looking for a rhythm section. They found a bass player in Hans Ziech (born 1943) of the local band The Soul, and also picked up that band's drummer, Cees Kalis. The Soul's guitar player, Eric Wenink, also joined, for a couple of years. Throughout 1968 and 1969 the band practiced new music while listening to the music of Jimi Hendrix, Moby Grape, Jefferson Airplane. The decision was made to look for a singer, and Manuela Berloth joined them.

In 1968, before a show in Beverwijk, the band's name was changed to Earth and Fire. The band recorded two songs as the prize for winning a talent show in 1969, but were not offered a record contract; by the end of the year, Berloth, who in Gerard Koerts' words "was not a rock 'n roll woman", left. The Koerts brothers, who were graduating from school at the time, took over on vocals, and the band continued touring, opening for established beat band Golden Earring. In September 1969, they met and hired Jerney Kaagman.

The band's first album, Earth and Fire (1970), produced three hits: "Seasons" reached no. 2 on the Dutch charts, with an estimated 60,000 copies sold; the second single, "Ruby Is the One" (later covered by the Claw Boys Claw for Hitkillers) reached no. 4 and sold 40,000 copies.

By 1977, after four albums and nine hits, particularly songs such as "Memories" (which became their first number one single, and was named song of the year in Israel) and "Maybe Tomorrow, Maybe Tonight". 1977's Gate to Infinity suffered a cool reception and the album's lead single, "78th Avenue", failed to break into the Dutch top 10. Drummer Ton van der Kleij left in August 1978, followed shortly thereafter by bass player Theo Hurts. In 1979, they achieved their second number one single "Weekend", but soon afterwards, Chris Koerts left, feeling that he had achieved everything he wanted with the band.

The band split in 1983, with Kaagman moving onto a solo career, before a short lived reunion in 1987. Later, Kaagman became a judge on the Dutch "Idols" adaptation of the Idols franchise. Ton van der Kleij died in 2015. Gerard Koerts died in 2019 of a lung disease. Bert Ruiter and Chris Koerts died in 2022. Jerney Kaagman died in 2026.

== Personnel ==
=== Members ===
- Gerard Koerts - keyboards, backing vocals, flute (1968–1983; died 2019)
- Chris Koerts - guitars, backing vocals (1968–1979; died 2022)
- Hans Ziech - bass (1968–1974)
- Cees Kalis - drums (1968–1970; died 2006)
- Manuela Berloth - lead vocals (1968–1969)
- Jerney Kaagman - lead vocals (1969–1983, 1987–1990); died 2026)
- Ton van der Kleij - drums, backing vocals, percussion (1970–1978; died 2015)
- Theo Hurts - bass, guitar (1974–1978)
- Bert Ruiter - bass (1978–1983, 1987–1990; died 2022)
- Ab Tamboer - drums, percussion (1978–1983, 1987–1990; died 2016)
- Johan Slager - guitars (1979–1980; died 2025)
- Ronnie Meyjes - guitars (1980–1983)
- Age Kat - guitars (1987–1990)
- Jons Pistoor - keyboards (1987–1990)
- Ton Scherpenzeel - keyboards (1987–1990)
- Mark Stoop - drums (1990)

== Discography ==
=== Albums ===
- Earth and Fire (1970)
- Song of the Marching Children (1971)
- Atlantis (1973)
- To the World of the Future (1975)
- Rock Sensation (1975 COMPILATION)
- Gate to Infinity (1977)
- Reality Fills Fantasy (1979)
- Andromeda Girl (1981)
- In a State of Flux (1982)
- Phoenix (1989)
- Greatest Hits (CD) (1991)
- Wild And Exciting (1999 compilation)
- The Ultimate Collection (3CD) (2003)

=== Singles ===
| Year | Single | Chart positions | | | Album |
| Year | Single | NL | BEL (Vl) | GER | Album |
|---|---|---|---|---|---|
| 1969 | "Seasons" | 2 | 4 | — | Earth and Fire |
| 1970 | "Ruby Is the One" | 5 | 11 | — | Earth and Fire |
| 1970 | "Wild and Exciting" | 5 | 21 | — | Earth and Fire |
| 1971 | "Invitation" | 4 | — | — | non-album single |
| 1971 | "Storm and Thunder" | 6 | — | — | Song of the Marching Children |
| 1972 | "Memories" | 1 | 2 | 31 | non-album single |
| 1973 | "Maybe Tomorrow, Maybe Tonight" | 3 | 9 | 44 | Atlantis |
| 1974 | "Love of Life" | 2 | 20 | — | To the World of the Future |
| 1975 | "Only Time Will Tell" | 16 | — | — | To the World of the Future |
| 1975 | "Thanks for the Love" | 9 | 28 | — | non-album single |
| 1976 | "What Difference Does It Make" | 10 | — | — | non-album single |
| 1977 | "78th Avenue" | 14 | — | — | Gate to Infinity |
| 1979 | "Weekend" | 1 | 1 | 1 | Reality Fills Fantasy |
| 1980 | "Fire of Love" | 20 | 13 | 29 | Reality Fills Fantasy |
| 1981 | "Dream" | 19 | 20 | — | Andromeda Girl |
| 1981 | "Tell Me Why" | 37 | — | — | Andromeda Girl |
| 1982 | "Love Is an Ocean" | — | — | — | Andromeda Girl |
| 1982 | "Twenty Four Hours" | 15 | 23 | 72 | In a State of Flux |
| 1983 | "Jack Is Back" | 42 | — | — | In a State of Flux |
| 1983 | "The Two of Us" | 32 | — | — | In a State of Flux |
| 1989 | "French Word for Love" | 44 | — | — | Phoenix |
| 1990 | "Keep on Missing You" | — | — | — | Phoenix |
| 1990 | "Good Enough" | — | — | — | Phoenix |

== Bibliography ==
- Hermsen, Fred; Hermsen, Dick (2006). Earth and Fire: de biografie, 1969-1983. Eburon. ISBN 9789059721289.
