= Lasse Westman =

Swedish filmmaker and cartoonist (1938–2025)

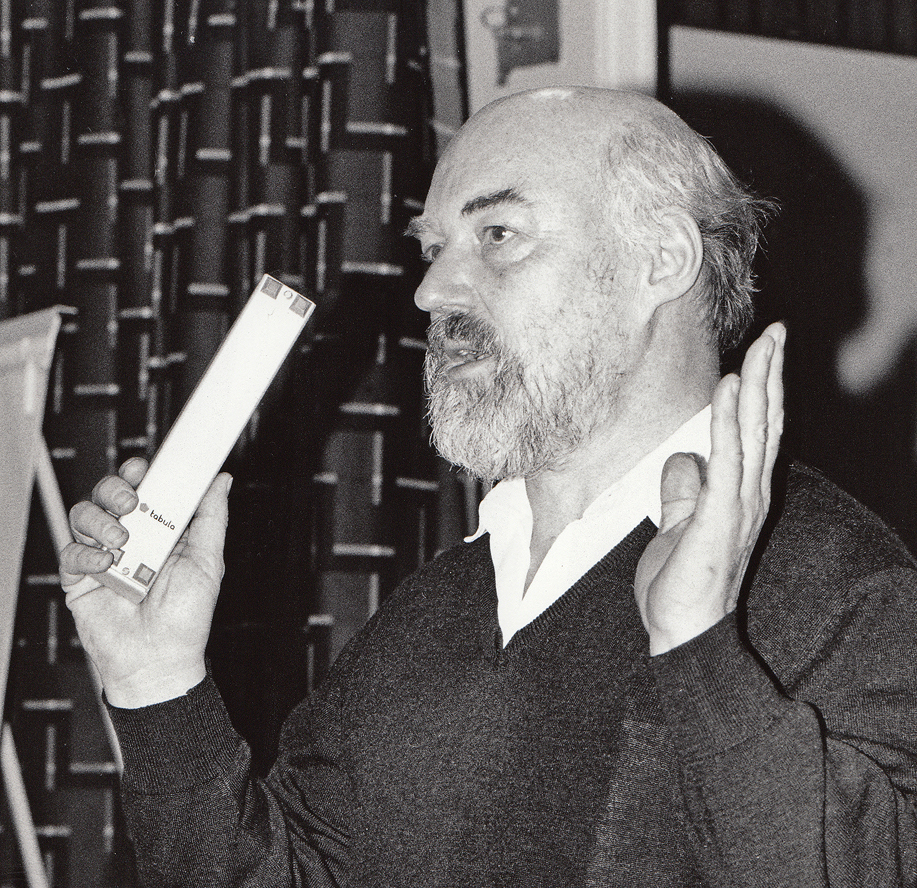
Westman in 1994

Lars (Lasse) Gerhard Westman (27 September 1938 – 16 September 2025) was a Swedish filmmaker and cartoonist.

== Life and career ==
Lasse Westman was born on 27 September 1938. He studied art (Kursverksamheten) at Stockholm University in 1963, art and advertising at Beckmans Reklamskola, Stockholm, in 1964, and attended Swedish Television's producer school in 1969.

He worked for ten years as a typographer, and had been involved in film-making for nearly 50 years, primarily for Scandinavian television. More than 280 of his films have been broadcast in Sweden, Finland, Norway, Denmark, Germany, France, and US, and via satellite by Art and the Discovery Channel. He made three films with cinema releases in Scandinavia. His work won prizes in Canada, Germany, Bulgaria, Sweden, and Brazil. He was awarded a lifelong stipendium for Swedish filmmakers by the Swedish Ministry of Culture.

One of his projects, a series entitled Around the World, took him to 42 countries. He lived in West Africa and made 20 films about struggle and culture in Africa. He depicted the life of a seven-year-old boy born with a serious skin disease in Victor, A Triumph. Together with midwife Signe Jansson he made a film, Birth, often shown in maternity wards, to make our start in life easier. He filmed underwater births in the Soviet Union, several programs on drought and starvation in Africa during the 1970s, several films about child development, and a film about calligraphy and the role of art in China (From The Old Comes The New). He followed striking miners in 1969–70 in Comrades, Our Enemies Are Well Organized, portrayed a radioactive accident in Brazil (I Have Cesium In My Blood and I Am Scared), as well the effect of the Chernobyl disaster on Scandinavia (Laps, Mountains, and Reindeer).

He filmed his mother's life and death over 20 years (Facing Death), and the building of the longest bridge in Europe between Sweden and Denmark (Walking On Water) over six years for film and television.

Westman had four children and nine grandchildren. He died on 16 September 2025, at the age of 86.

== Selected filmography ==
- 1966: Habla Fidel (director)
- 1968: Sanningen om Båstad (director)
- 1970: Kamrater, motståndaren är välorganiserad (director, cinematographer & editor)
- 1994: Maria och kärleken (cinematographer)
- 2000: Gå på vatten (director & cinematographer)
