= Euskefeurat =

Euskefeurat is a music group from Piteå, Sweden.

Euskefeurat is an adjective in the local Norrbottnic dialect which means "tired" or "worn out". Founded in 1977, Euskefeurat is a local patriotic leftleaning band from the northern Swedish town of Piteå. It stopped in 1994 and restarted in 2005. Among the members are Ronny Eriksson, Bengt Ruthström, Dan Engman and Stefan Isaksson. Various others have been part during different periods.

On 9 April 2005, Euskeufeurat came together for an evening and soon after, during the summer of 2005, Euskefeurat could be heard and seen in Harads, Pajala, Skule, Burträsk and Piteå, all in northern Sweden.

Many Euskefeurat songs are sung in Pitemål, a local dialect, which is said to have been good for the popularity of the dialect.

== Discography ==
=== Ägge borte katta ===
Published: 1982

People: Ronny Eriksson, Bengt Ruthström, Stefan Isaksson, Irene Danielsson, Erling Fredriksson, Arn Johansson

Songs:

- Euskefeurat
- Mutta herra jumala
- Lillpitevisan
- Vaggvisa
- Bonden o björn
- Sommarens sista kväll
- Båkaspännarn
- Hand i hand
- Altersbruk
- Seskarövisan
- Folke
- Namnlösas här

=== Levandes ===
Published: 1984

People: Ronny Eriksson, Bengt Ruthström, Stefan Isaksson, Irene Danielsson, Erling Fredriksson, Arn Johansson

Songs:

- Skweelarn
- Innerst inne är vi alla folkpartister
- Deborah
- Konsumvisan
- Daniel och Siv
- Hör du Bengt
- Tankar på nattgammal is
- Det är hit man kommer när man kommer hem
- Vårvisa
- Stockholm marathon
- Länge har vi väntat

=== Aotom Taotom ===
Published: 1986

People: Ronny Eriksson, Bengt Ruthström, Stefan Isaksson, Sonia Harr, Dan Engman, Arn Johansson

Songs:

- Ao'tom tao'tom
- Älva hon glema
- Pessimiskonsulten
- Mathilda
- Tips och penninglotter
- Kvad
- Sjunde dagen
- Vöre val'e
- Handelsresanden
- Apparata
- Norrbotten

=== Hoven droven ===
Published: 1988

People: Ronny Eriksson, Bengt Ruthström, Stefan Isaksson, Sonia Harr, Dan Engman, Arn Johansson

Songs:

- Då å dåij
- Mer och mer och mer
- Vad jag är bra
- Bannes Johannes
- Till Ingela
- En fri man
- Jag skiter i det sexuella
- He'ven
- Storswänsken
- Till Elias

=== Bondångersånger ===
Published: 1990

People: Ronny Eriksson, Bengt Ruthström, Stefan Isaksson, Sonia Harr, Dan Engman, Per Isaksson

Songs:

- Bondångersång
- Nya gungor & karuseller
- Gösta
- Konjak & nazister
- Gunde Svan
- Annagreta
- Lingonrap
- Tröstvals för bondånger
- Bluebird från Kall
- Gnölar'n
- Requiem
- Bondånger

=== Hipp Happ ===
Published: 1993

People: Ronny Eriksson, Bengt Ruthström, Stefan Isaksson, Dan Engman, Per Isaksson

Songs:

- Marknasvisa
- Min brorsa
- Ge dom vad dom tål
- Gropen
- Härifrån till Bryssel
- Jag måste vara galen om regeringen är klok
- Passar det dig
- Leonard Larssons testamente
- Farssan är död
- Inte odumt
- Ingen alls

=== Sista färden hem till byn ===
Published: 1994

People: Ronny Eriksson, Bengt Ruthström, Stefan Isaksson, Dan Engman, Per Isaksson, Robert Lundberg, among others

Songs:

- Euskefeurat
- Fri man
- Vischan blues
- Bonden och björn
- Aotom taotom
- Jämna plågor
- Minnen
- Jag vill städa i Europa
- Konjak & nazister
- Min brorsa
- Jag skiter i det sexuella
- Gunde Svan
- Tankar på nattgammal is
- Jag måste vara galen om regeringen är klok
- Med guds hjälp och bingolotto
- Inte odumt
- Squelar'n
- Kvad
- Det är hit man kommer när man kommer hem

=== Lurv ===
Published: 2008

People: Ronny Eriksson, Bengt Ruthström, Stefan Isaksson, Dan Engman, Per Isaksson, Robert Lundberg

- Gråtvals
- Åh, Lönsamhet
- Sankte Per
- Gode Gud i himmelen
- 75-års Renault
- Säg haver ni hört
- Littorin Humpa
- Far min
- Flyktingarna
- Husvagnblues
- Evert stod på lagårdsbacken
- När jag en gång dör
- Leonard Larssons testamente
- Hem till Altersbruk
- Vöre vale
- Spela Creedence

=== Aldrig för sent att ge opp ===
- Published:2010
- People: Ronny Eriksson, Bengt Ruthström, Stefan Isaksson, Dan Engman, Per Isaksson, Robert Lundberg
1. Nö'bert vä ve
2. Det mesta rår nog spriten för
3. Fullmånen lyser över skogen
4. Rosa Kata Alexandra Moa Margareta
5. Faster Aina
6. Gunnar
7. Vi sjöng "Arbetets söner"
8. Holger
9. Mosa'tramparn
10. Den officiella versionen
11. Nu pissar vi i brallorna igen
12. Perellin humppa
13. Aldrig för sent att ge opp
14. Apparata
15. Mathilda

=== Sånger från Hotaheiti ===
- Published: 2014
- People: Ronny Eriksson, Bengt Ruthström, Kenneth Berg, Dan Engman, Per Isaksson, Robert Lundberg
1. Åren går o tiden lider
2. Långt från kusinerna i stan
3. Hotaheiti
4. Egentligen
5. Holmström
6. Förut ligger nära
7. Snöslungan
8. 21 augusti
9. Tjära o fjädrar
10. Himlen var blå
11. Helt utan egen förskyllan
12. Bönhuset
13. Alla ska vi dö en dag
