= Arja Saijonmaa =

Finnish singer (born 1944)

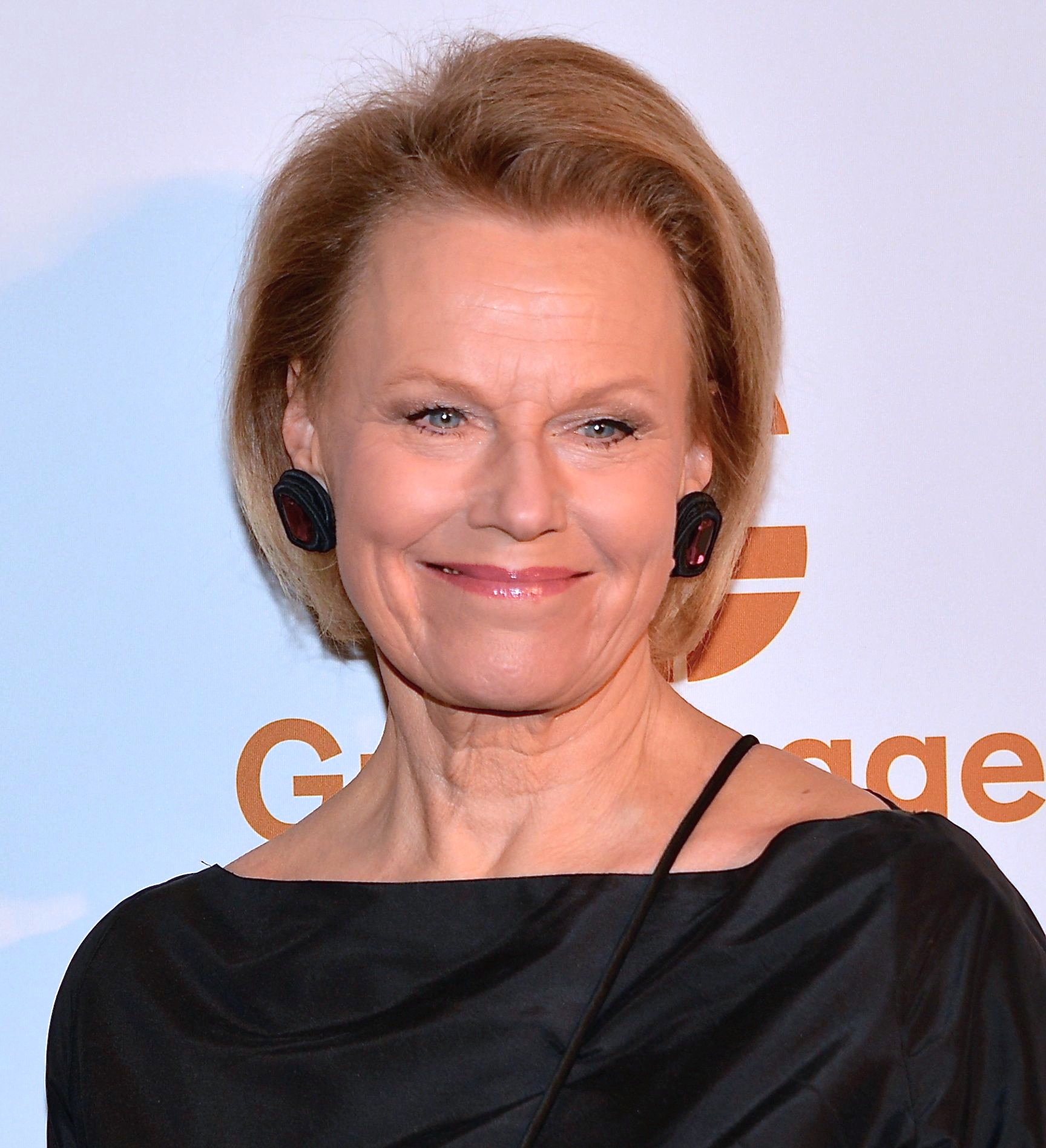
- Arja Saijonmaa at Guldbaggegalan 2013.

Background information
- Born: Arja Enni Helena Saijonmaa; 1 December 1944 (age 81); Mikkeli, Finland
- Genres: Pop, Schlager
- Occupation: singer

Arja Enni Helena Saijonmaa (born 1 December 1944) is a Finnish singer, political activist and occasional actress.

== Life and career ==
She studied at the Sibelius Academy and earned a Bachelor of Arts at the Helsinki University. She made her breakthrough as a singer in Sweden. She has made albums with Swedish translations of songs by Mikis Theodorakis, as well as covers of Zarah Leander songs.

In 1978 she issued Miten voi kyllin kiittää, an album of Finnish translations of the songs of the Chilean composer and singer Violeta Parra. A Swedish version, Jag vill tacka livet, came out the following year. The title song, "Jag vill tacka livet" ("Gracias a la vida") was one of her greatest hits. Swedish prime minister Olof Palme had been a close friend, and his widow wanted Arja to sing at the funeral in 1986. She sang Ine Megalos O Kaimos in Swedish. In 1987, she participated at Melodifestivalen with the song "Högt över havet", ending up second. The same year, she scored a Svensktoppen hit with the song Jag vill leva i Europa.

As a politician, she has been a member of the Swedish People's Party in Finland, and in 1987 she was appointed UNHCR Goodwill Ambassador. She has written a Norwegian-language book, Sauna, about the Finnish sauna tradition.

She appeared in the first season of Let's Dance, the Swedish version of Strictly Come Dancing in 2006. Her professional partner was Tobias Karlsson, aged 28, and they were eliminated in the 7th week. In December 2007, Saijonmaa participated in the Swedish reality show Stjärnorna på slottet along with Peter Stormare, Britt Ekland, Jan Malmsjö and Magnus Härenstam.

She participated in Melodifestivalen 2019 with the song "Mina fyra årstider".

Saijonmaa is both the Finnish and Swedish voice actor of Emma the Stage Rat in the Finnish-British animated television family drama Moominvalley (2019–).

== Discography ==
Finnish language

- 1972: Laula kanssani toveri
- 1972: Arja Saijonmaa & Mikis Theodorakis
- 1973: Koko yön minun poikani valvoi
- 1975: Huomenta sydämeni
- 1979: Jokainen arkiaamu – Arja Saijonmaa & Mikis Theodorakis Ateenassa
- 1979: Miten voin kyllin kiittää
- 1981: Ruotsiin ja takaisin
- 1983: Ystävän laulu
- 1985: La Cumparsita
- 1988: Arja Saijonmaa & George de Godzinsky Finlandia-talossa
- 1989: Yhteinen taivas ja maa
- 1993: Paijaa mua
- 2000: Sydänten silta
- 2006: Rakkaus on rohkeutta

Reissues

- 1985: Valitut laulut
- 1988: Arja Saijonmaa (2LP)
- 1995: 20 Suosikkia: Ystävän laulu:
- 2001: 20 Suosikkia: Satumaa
- 2007: Tähtisarja – 30 suosikkia (2CD)

Swedish language

- 1977: Det är tid att sjunga sånger
- 1977: Tango Jalousie
- 1978: Arja Saijonmaa i Stockholms konserthus
- 1979: Jag vill tacka livet
- 1981: Sånger från asfalt och ängar
- 1982: Leksar och parfym
- 1987: Högt över havet
- 1988: Arja sjunger Zarah
- 1989: Samma himmel, samma sol
- 1994: La Cumparsita
- 1998: Bara du kommer
- 1999: En bro av gemenskap
- 2003: Arja Nära

Reissues

- 1994: Arja's bästa
- 2000: Guldkorn
- 2002: 100% (2CD)
- 2005: Vad du än trodde så trodde du fel

Other languages

- 1976: Bonjour mon coeur
- 1983: Es ist Zeit

| Title | Year | Peak chart positions | Album |
| Title | Year | SWEHeat. | Album |
|---|---|---|---|
| "Mina fyra årstider" | 2019 | 7 | Non-album single |

== Films ==
Arja Saijonmaa has appeared in the following films:

- 1969: Punatukka
- 1969: Pohjan tähteet
- 1979: Herr Puntila and His Servant Matti

== Bibliography ==
Swedish language

- Sauna, ISBN 91-7709-514-6 (bound) Malmö, Sweden : Richters förlag, 2000 Swedish 271 pages.
- En ung naken kvinna : mötet med Mikis (A young naked woman – the meeting with Mikis), ISBN 978-91-642-0345-8 (bound) Stockholm, Sweden : Piratförlaget, 2011 Swedish 443 pages, [16] picture pages + 1 CD with four songs by Mikis Theodorakis

== Sources ==
Tony Latva and Petri Tuunainen, Iskelmän tähtitaivas, WSOY 2004, ISBN 951-0-27817-3
M.A. Numminen, Tango on intohimoni, Schilds 1998, ISBN 951-50-0918-9

| Preceded by (Netherlands) DeeDee (Retrospective) | OGAE Second Chance Contest winner 1987 | Succeeded by (Sweden) Lena Philipsson |
