= Monica Forsberg =

Swedish singer, songwriter and actress

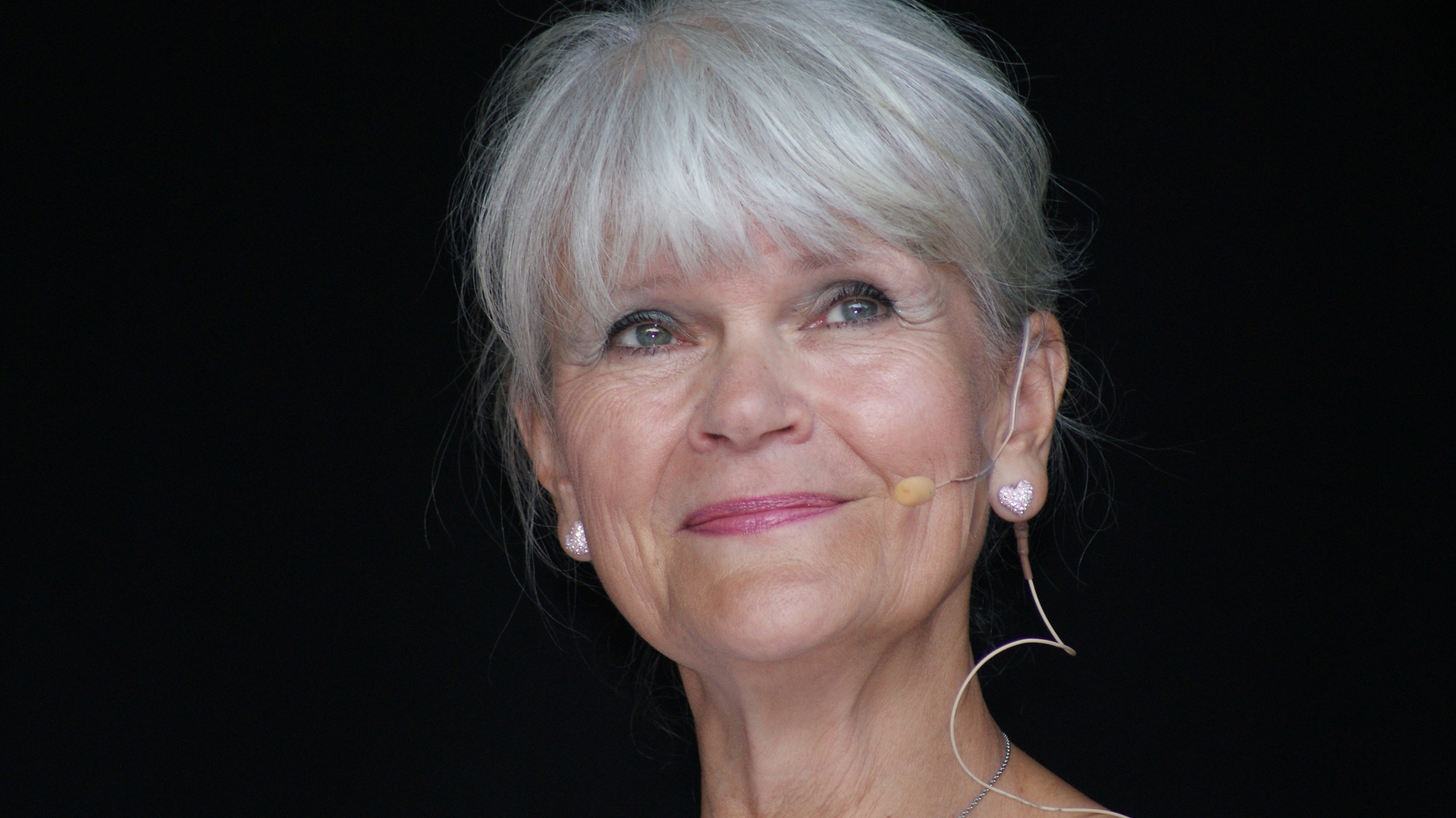
- Monica Forsberg (2013)

Background information
- Born: 14 September 1950 (age 75); Karlskoga, Sweden
- Genres: Dansband music, Pop, Rock, Schlager
- Occupations: Composer, lyricist, singer, actress

Monica Yvonne Forsberg (born 14 September 1950) is a Swedish singer, songwriter and actress. She was a member in the group Ritz, which competed in Melodifestivalen in 1983 (which finished number 4 with the song "Marionett") and 1985 (with the song "Nu har det hänt igen", which finished unplaced).

== Life and career ==
Forsberg was born in Karlskoga. Following her Melodifestivalen appearance, from the late 1980s until the early 2000s, she dubbed Disney movies and cartoons, including DuckTales.

== Awards ==
As a lyrics writer, she won Melodifestivalen twice, with these songs:

- 1982: "Dag efter dag" with Chips
- 1983: "Främling" with Carola Häggkvist

Other songs she has competed with in Melodifestivalen as lyrics writer:

- 1983: "Marionett" with Ritz, 4th
- 1984: "Nu är jag tillbaks igen" with Janne Önnerud, unplaced, "Schack och matt" with Rosa Körberg, unplaced
- 1985: "Eld och lågor" with Göran Folkestad, 3rd, "Nu har det hänt igen" with Ritz, unplaced
- 1986: "Fem i tolv" with Fredrik Willstrand, unplaced
- 1988: "100%" with Lotta Engberg & Triple & Touch, 3rd, "Bang, en explosion" with Haakon Pedersen, 4th, "Kärlek är" with Sten Nilsson & Nilssonettes, unplaced
- 1996: "Juliette & Jonathan" with Lotta Engberg, 3rd
