= God morgon (Chips song) =

1981 Chips song

Single by Chips
- A-side: "God morgon"
- B-side: "More than a Minute"
- Released: 1981
- Genre: schlager
- Length: 3:01
- Label: Mariann
- Songwriters: Lasse Holm, Torgny Söderberg

Chips singles chronology
"Mycke' mycke' mer" (1980)	"God morgon" (1981)	"Dag efter dag" (1982)

"God morgon" is a pop song in Swedish, performed by the pop and country group Chips, just then named "Sweets 'n Chips", at the Swedish Melodifestivalen 1981, where it finished 2nd. Its lyrics are about morning. "God morgon" was written by Lasse Holm and Torgny Söderberg. With this song, Elisabeth Andreasson and made her Melodifestivalen debut. In 1981, "God morgon" was also released as a single. On 5 April 1981 the song entered number one on the Swedish hitlist Svensktoppen. The song was also recorded with lyrics in English, as "Good Morning".

During the 2001-2004 Kikki, Bettan & Lotta shows, the song text was often changed to God afton (Good evening), since most of the shows took place in the evenings.

In May–June 2017, a recording by Ida Redig could be heard in Kungsängen bed commercials.

At Så mycket bättre 2017, the song was recorded by Tomas Andersson Wij.
