= Sofia Källgren =

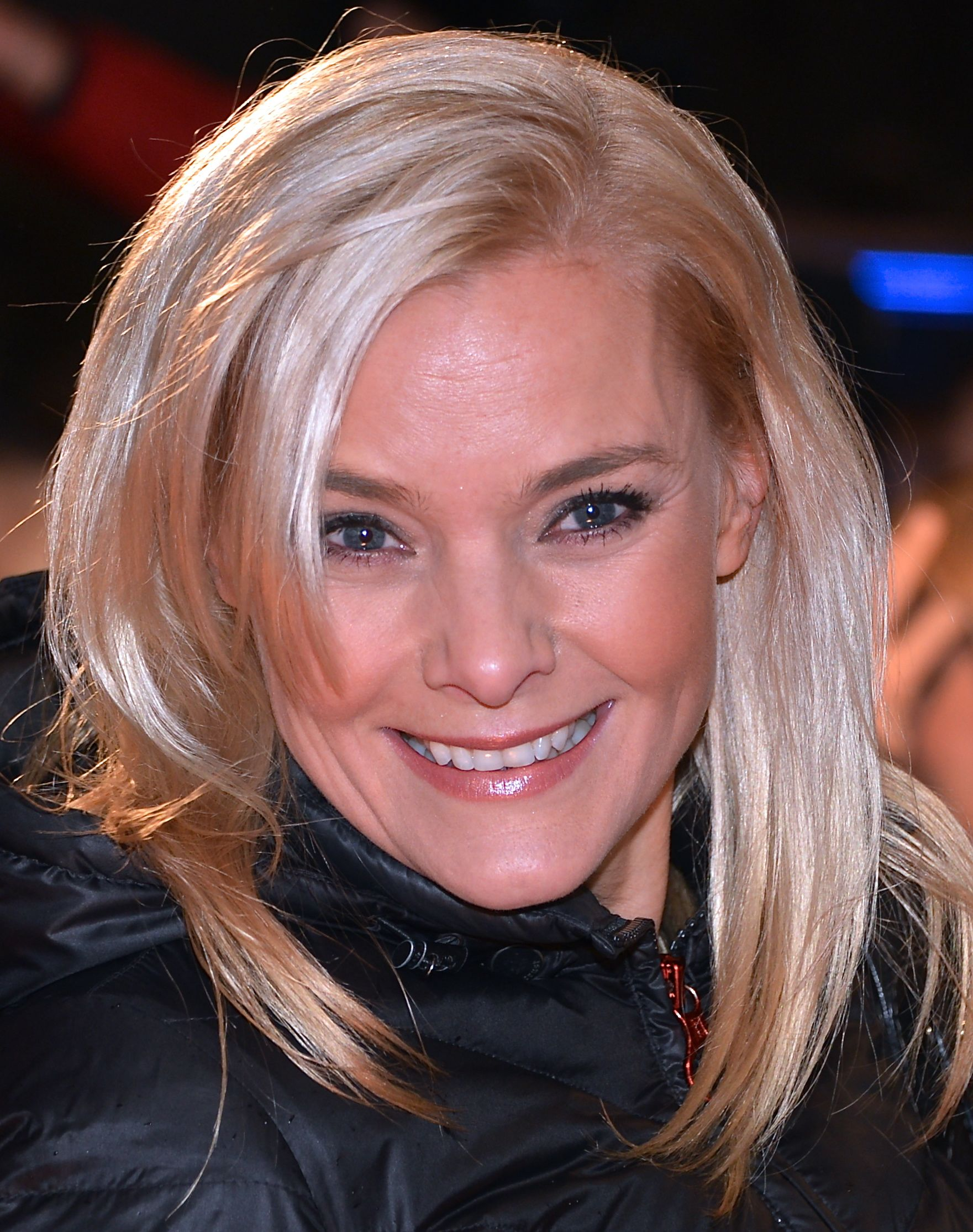
- Källgren in 2012

Background information
- Born: Anna Sofia Helena Källgren; 17 August 1970 (age 55); Gothenburg, Sweden
- Occupation: Singer
- Years active: 1986–present

Anna Sofia Helena Källgren (born 17 August 1970) is a Swedish singer. She sings in two other languages, English and Mandarin Chinese, in addition to in Swedish.

== Biography ==
In 1982 she debuted on the TV-program Gomorron Sverige on Sveriges Television. In 1986 she performed the song "I Know Him So Well" from Chess in De okändas revy leading to participation in a televised talent show Folkparkernas talangjakt. In 1987 she was awarded the Ulla Billquist-scholarship.

Källgren performed a song, "Världen är vacker", entered to Melodifestivalen 1989. The song was not selected, but Källgren was offered to perform the song "Världen är vår" with Visitors. In Melodifestivalen 1990 she entered again and performed "Handen på hjärtat" solo backed up by three dancers wearing partial fursuits.

She has performed as Belle in the Swedish version of Beauty and the Beast, as Odette in The Swan Princess, and as Rainbow Twilight Brite, Rare Twilight Brite, Happy Twilight Brite, Pink Twilight Brite, Purple Twilight Brite, Unicorn Twilight Brite, Pegasus Twilight Brite, Cinderella, Alice, Princess Aurora, and Belle in The Powerpuff Girls' Adventure. She was awarded Guldmasken (The Golden Mask) for her 1998 performance in the musical Miss Saigon at Göta Lejon in Stockholm.

Källgren has performed in several church concerts and festivals. In 2000 she toured with Rhapsody in Rock, replacing Carola Häggkvist, and that Christmas she toured with Tito Beltran, Orsa spelmän and Kalle Moraeus. Together with Robert Wells she participated in Melodifestivalen 2003, but failed to reach the final.

Källgren lives in Bromma with her husband and their son and daughter.

== Selected discography ==
=== Albums ===
- Handen på hjärtat (1990)
- Julen är kommen (1990)
- Min älskade (1992)
- Skönheten och odjuret (soundtrack) (1992)
- Mina sånger (1994)
- My Love (2003)
- 東方西方 (Eastward Westward) vol. 1 (2005)
- 東方西方 (Eastward Westward) vol. 2 (2006)
- Cinema Paradiso (2008)

=== Singles ===
- "Längtans vind" / "Världen är vacker" (1989)
- "Phantom of the Opera" / "Wherever You Go" (duet with Uffe Persson) (1989)
- "Världen är vår" / "The World in Our Hands" (with Visitors) (1989)
- "This Time" / "Jag kan se en ängel" (1990)
- "Kärleken är en hemlighet" / "Regnbågen" (1991)
- "Beatrice" / "Luften jag andas (kärlekens mjuka röst)" (1992)
- "Skönheten och odjuret" (duet with Tommy Körberg) / "Till marknaden" / "Kampen på torget" (1992)
- "För längre än för alltid" (duet with Roger Pontare) (1995)
- "Fri" / "En vinterdag" (from the film Sprängaren) (2001)
- "My Love" (with Robert Wells) (2003)
- "Eastward Westward" (2005)

The song "Handen på hjärtat" also charted on Svensktoppen
