= Chips (Swedish band) =

Swedish pop band

- Origin: Sweden
- Genres: Country; country pop; pop; schlager
- Years active: 1979–1983
- Label: Mariann

Chips was a Swedish country group formed in Sweden in 1979.

== History ==
Chips finished 4th in the Swedish Melodifestivalen 1980 with the song "Mycke' mycke' mer", with Lars Westman, Lisa Magnusson, Mats Rådberg and Monica Silverstrand (back then Barwén) as background singers. After Melodifestivalen 1980, Britta ”Tanja” Johansson also became a member. In 1980, the album Chips was released and shortly after this, Elisabeth Andreasson became a member. Just some weeks after this, they toured the former West Germany.

Under a new name Sweets 'n Chips, which they used since a dansband also said they owned the right for the name Chips, the group competed at the Swedish Melodifestivalen 1981, and finished second with the song "God morgon". A little bit later the group was reduced to two members, Danielsson and Andreasson, although Holm stayed as songwriter.

Chips won the Swedish Melodifestivalen 1982, with the song "Dag efter dag". They represented Sweden at the Eurovision Song Contest 1982 in Harrogate in the United Kingdom, there they finished 8th.

After the 1982 Swedish Melodifestivalen success, the album Having a Party was released, and sold around 100,000 copies in Sweden. They toured the northern parts of Europe and had a successful 1982. However, the group split in 1983, due to limited success outside Sweden and Norway, and also because both members had solo careers.

== Discography ==
- Chips (1980)
- Having a Party (1982)

== Svensktoppen songs ==
- "Mycké, mycké mer" (1980)
- "High School" (1980)
- "God morgon" (1981)
- "Här kommer solen" (1982)
- "Dag efter dag" (1982)

== Personnel ==
Principal members

- Kikki Danielsson – vocals (1979–1983)
- Lasse Holm – vocals, piano (1979–1983)
- Britta Johansson – vocals (1980–1981)
- Elisabeth Andreassen – vocals (1980–1983)

Awards and achievements
Preceded by Björn Skifs with "Fångad i en dröm"	Sweden in the Eurovision Song Contest; 1982	Succeeded by Carola with "Främling"
