= Jerney Kaagman =

Dutch singer (1947–2026)

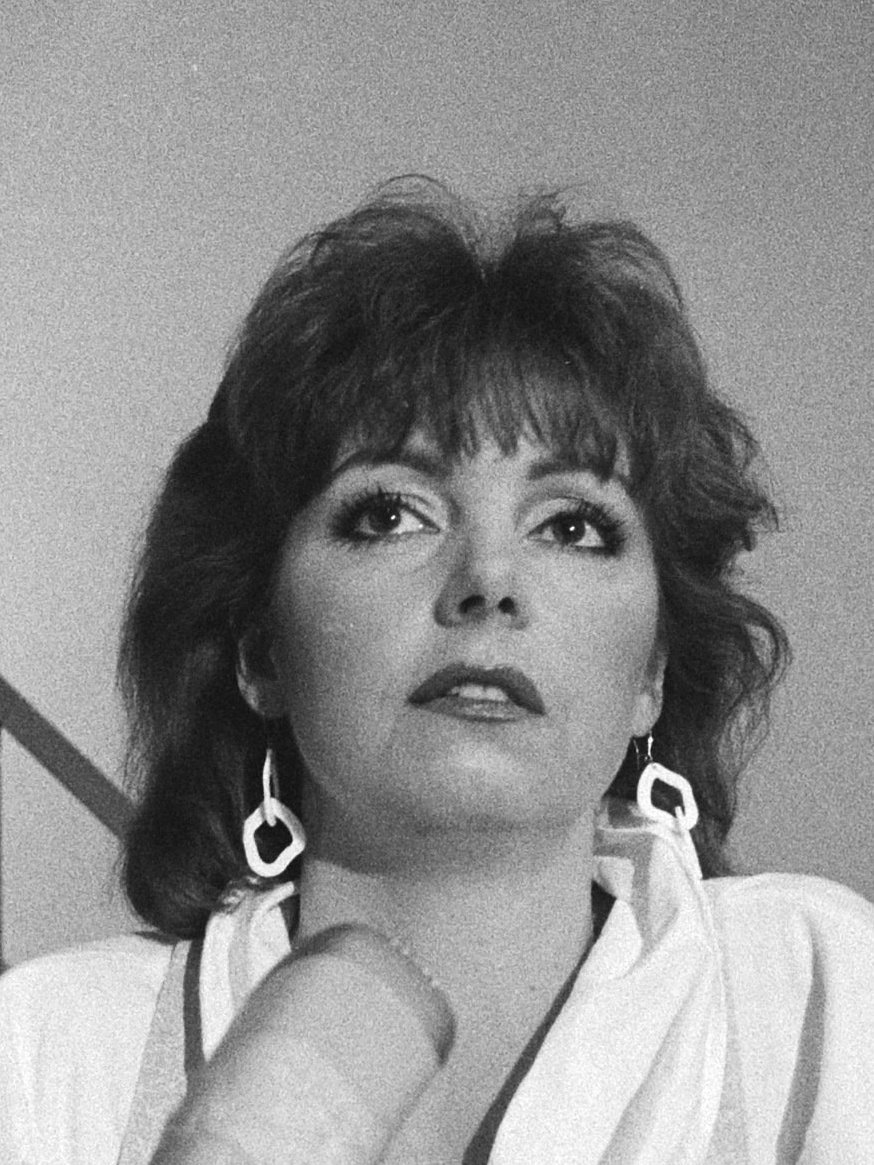
- Kaagman in 1984
- Born: Christina Henriette Kaagman; 9 July 1947; The Hague, Netherlands
- Died: 31 July 2026 (aged 79); Blaricum, Netherlands
- Occupations: Singer, songwriter
- Years active: 1969–2012

Christina Henriette "Jerney" (Note: Stage-name deliberately misspelled, to make domestic, native Dutch-speakers pronounce it as 'Journey'.) Kaagman (9 July 1947 – 31 July 2026) was a Dutch singer-musician and music executive best known as the lead singer for the progressive rock group Earth and Fire, with which she scored a slew of international hits between 1969 and 1990. She also recorded as a solo artist also. After her career as a singer, she worked for the music industry, as president of the Dutch musicians' union BV Pop; as a public relations manager for a radio station; and on television, as a judge on television talent show Idols from 2002 to 2008.

== Early life and career ==
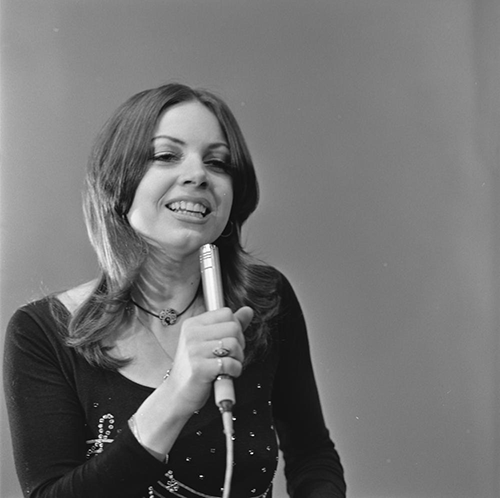
Kaagman in television studio performance with Earth and Fire, 1973

Kaagman attended high school at Huygens Lyceum, Voorburg, and was a member of the school choir and a school band, The Rangers. She also completed a secretarial course.

In September 1969 she was invited to sing in the pop group Earth and Fire. After the band split in 1983, she made two solo albums and appeared in the first issue of Dutch Playboy (May 1983). She made another appearance at the age of 60 in April 2008.

Kaagman was president of the Dutch musicians' union BV Pop. In the nineties, she was the public relations manager at the radio station Noordzee FM, and in 2000 she became director of Buma Culture Foundation. She supported making music downloads illegal. On 26 December 2008, she announced her departure from the music industry on Radio 1.

On 31 March 2009, Kaagman left Buma Culture. At the farewell reception, a day before, she was appointed Knight of the Order of Orange-Nassau.

== Personal life and death ==
Kaagman never married, but had a long time relationship with Bert Ruiter, bass player for Focus and Earth and Fire. On 18 October 2012, she announced her retirement, due to suffering from Parkinson's disease.

On 31 July 2026, Kaagman died from complications of Parkinsons's disease at the age of 79.

== Discography ==
=== Earth and Fire albums ===
- Earth and Fire (1970)
- Song of the Marching Children (1971)
- Atlantis (1973)
- To the World of the Future (1975)
- Gate to Infinity (1977)
- Reality Fills Fantasy (1979)
- Andromeda Girl (1981)
- In a State of Flux (1982)
- Phoenix (1989)

=== Earth and Fire singles ===
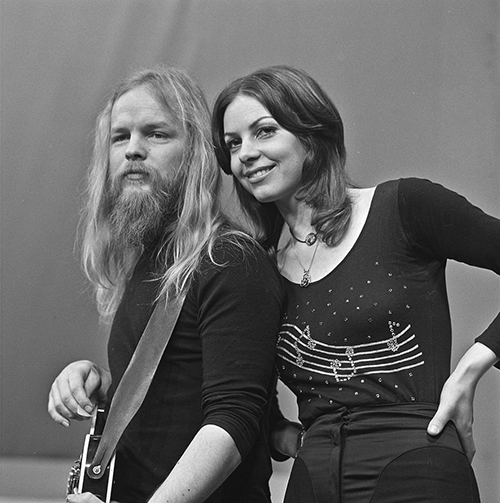
Jerney Kaagman and Chris Koerts (Earth and Fire) in AVRO's TopPop in 1973.

- "Seasons / Hazy Paradise" (1970)
- "Ruby is the One / Mechanical Lover" (1970)
- "Wild and Exciting / Vivid Shady Land" (1970)
- "Invitation / Song of the Marching Children" (1971)
- "Storm and Thunder / Lost Forever" (1971)
- "Memories / From the End Till the Beginning" (1972)
- "Maybe Tomorrow, Maybe Tonight / Theme from Atlantis" (1973)
- "Love of Life / Tuffy the Cat" (1974)
- "Only Time Will Tell / Fun" (1975)
- "Thanks for the Love" (1975)
- "What Difference Does It Make" (1976)
- "78th Avenue / Dizzy Raptures" (1977)
- "Weekend / Answer Me" (1979)
- "Fire of Love / Season of the Falling Leaves" (1980)
- "Rallye Monte-Carlo (Weekend) (1981)
- "Dream / Jerney's Day Off" (1981)
- "Tell Me Why / What More Could You Desire" (1981)
- "Love is an Ocean / You" (1982)
- "Twenty Four Hours / Strange Town" (1982)
- "Jack is Back / Hide Away" (1983)
- "The Two of Us / Love is to Give Away" (1983)

=== Solo albums ===
- Made on Earth (1984)
- Run (1987)

=== Solo singles ===
- Allright, Here I Am" / "Willow Tree" (1984)
- "I Will Love You Endlessly" / "Misery" (1984)
- "My Mystery Man" / "Misery" (1984)
- "I'll Take It" / "Misery" (1985)
- "Victim of the Night" / "Theme from V.O.N." (1986)
- "Running Away from Love" / "Dance to the Music" (1987)
- "Queen of Hearts" / "You've Got to Believe" (1988)
- "Don't Say It" / "I Don't Wanna Talk About It" (1988)
