= Fractionation Research Inc. =

Fractionation Research Inc. (FRI) is an industry cooperative organization that researches the performance of industrial-scale mass transfer devices such as trays, packings and other column internals. Its objective is to facilitate the design of more economical distillation, absorption and stripping systems. Before the formation of FRI, such research was performed on a small scale by universities or private companies. The latter controlled their results as proprietary information, generally inaccessible by competitors.

== History ==
FRI is a non-profit organization formed by petroleum, chemical and engineering companies to perform plant-scale research in distillation. It began in 1952, spearheaded by Dr. Karl Hachmuth and T. B. Hudson of Phillips Petroleum Company in Bartlesville, Oklahoma. Hachmuth was noted for his research into the design of mass transfer equipment, He realized that the effort required would be beyond the resources of a single company, and proposed the formation of a cooperative organization to pursue this work. Hudson became the first president of FRI. In 1954, FRI contracted to use a simulation facility at the headquarters of C. F. Braun & Co. in Alhambra, California. Operations continued at Alhambra until 1989, when Braun was acquired by Halliburton, Inc., and merged into its Brown & Root subsidiary (now KBR).

== Location ==
FRI moved its facilities to Oklahoma State University (OSU) at Stillwater, Oklahoma in 1991.[2] FRI initially planned a five-year research program. However, the board of directors has repeatedly voted to extend operations.

== Research scope ==
FRI has tested various types of fractionation trays and packings (both generic and proprietary designs), with the objective of developing correlations for predicting tray efficiencies and pressure drops. This information is needed to design fractionators, absorbers and strippers. It has also tested performance of other column internals such as liquid distributors. It periodically reports its findings to the member companies.

The OSU library maintains an unrestricted collection of FRI progress reports, plant tests, topical reports, consultants’ reports and annual reports that were issued during the period 1954 – 1970. FRI has also produced a number of unrestricted instructional films and videos, which are listed on its home page. These are available to non-members.

Examples of FRI Research Programs:

- Ultimate capacity of a distillation device

-Liquid & vapor maldistribution studies in packed columns

- Bed length effect on packing performance

- Structured packing performance with high pressure distillation systems

- Valve tray efficiency enhancement with push valves

- Foaming studies

- Tray performance at liquid rate applications

- Tray vibration and mitigation

- Kettle reboiler hydraulic study

- Heat transfer study of condenser with high performance tubes

- Performance measurement of proprietary devices

- Dividing wall column hydraulic and separation performance

- Multi-pass tray performance

- Entrainment data of large size structured packings and grid with a spray nozzle

- Effect of structured packing perforation and texture on performance

- Effects of Liquid Viscosity on Point Efficiency

Examples of FRI Modeling: FRI's tray and packing performance models are primarily derived from over 36,000 experimental distillation data points covering seven types of trays and packings. These models serve as reliable, accurate, unbiased, and independent tools for predicting both hydraulic and mass transfer performance.

== Membership ==
Initially, fifteen companies signed agreements with FRI and grew to 37 by the first stockholder meeting in November 1952. Membership continued to grow to a peak of 94 companies in 1995. Membership declined thereafter to 67 in 2008, primarily due to mergers. At first, nearly all members were U. S. companies; but by 2008 a majority of the members were not based in the U. S. Membership is made up of chemical, petroleum, and engineering/equipment vendors from 21 countries.

== Organization ==
Each member company is entitled to put one representative on the board of directors. The Board then elects an executive committee that directs the detailed business through the President and the Secretary of the company. The president is elected by the board of directors.

A Technical Advisory Committee, which also has one representative from each member company, oversees the research program. This committee elects a chairman and a smaller Technical Committee. The Technical Committee works with the FRI Technical Director (a full-time employee of FRI) to execute the research projects performed by the technical staff. Full-time staff currently includes eight technicians and four chemical engineers. A team environment is fostered through good communication and a collaborative approach to the planning and execution of projects. FRI uses continuing education and training to constantly push staff members to expand their knowledge.

== Members ==
FRI’s testing program is specified by the members and executed by FRI. Each Member company has one vote in the process to guide the research program. The research program contains a mix of basic distillation research and testing of proprietary devices. The purpose of FRI is to execute member-driven, well-planned experimental programs to collect large scale mass transfer hardware performance data with industrially representative chemical systems, and to report such data to its members clearly, in useful formats, and in a timely manner.

Webinars

- Quarterly

Software & Correlations

- FRI's Device Rating Program (DRP) has been shown to have higher levels of accuracy than other available methods when calculating tray and packing capacities and pressure drops.

Handbooks

- The Design Guidance Handbook (previously Volume 1 & 2) gives information regarding the design and rating of vapor-liquid contactors. Methods are given for the prediction of capacities; pressure drops and efficiencies. Contractors include dualflow trays, bubble cap trays, sieve trays, baffle trays, random packing, grid packing, structured packing and proprietary devices.

- The Design Practices Handbook (Previously Volume 5) is a compilation of current common Distillation Design Practices that are not provided or maintained by FRI's Technical Committee or the FRI Staff with their publications. This valuable document is maintained by the Design Practices Committee and is provided entirely for the benefit of the membership.

Networking

- Meetings held throughout the year allow members to meet with distillation specialists from other Member companies, including some of the world's greatest distillation experts.

FRI Distillation Academy

- A 4-day course is tailored to engineers with 3 – 15 years of experience in the mass transfer field. Through classroom teaching, videos, pictures, and practical examples the attendees will have a thorough understanding of the following topics upon completing this course.
