= Black Ingvars =

Swedish band

- Genres: Heavy metal
- Years active: 1995- ?
- Members: Magnus Tengby; Leif Larsson; Niels Nordin
- Past members: Henrik Ohlin; Anders Möller

Black Ingvars is a Swedish humorist heavy metal group. Black Ingvars is famous for cover versions of songs from other musical styles, like pop, children's song (including "Sjörövar Fabbe" and "Här kommer Pippi Långstrump"), dansband music, Christmas songs and gospel. They finished fifth in the Swedish Melodifestivalen 1998 with the song "Cherie".

Bassist Henrik Ohlin died in May 2021.
Singer and guitarist Anders Möller died in January 2026.

== Discography ==
- 1995 - Earcandy Six
- 1995 - Earcandy Five
- 1997 - Sjung Och Var Glad Med Black-Ingvars
- 1998 - Schlager Metal
- 1999 - Heaven Metal
- 2000 - Kids Superhits
- 2000 - The Very Best of dansbandshårdrock
- 2002 - Sjung Och Var Glad Med Black-Ingvars 2
