= Lasse Holm =

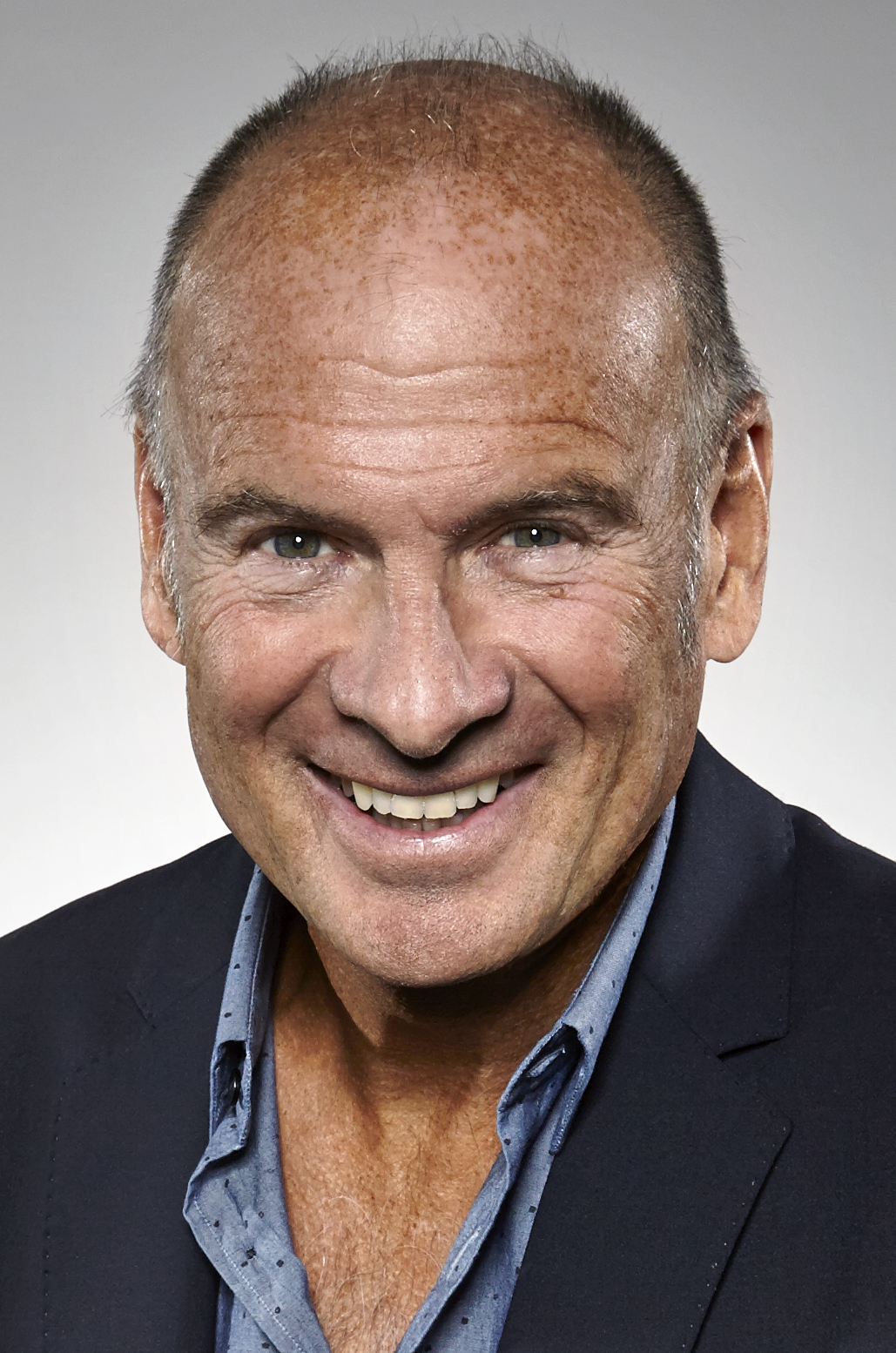
- Holm in 2014
- Born: Lars-Eric Gustav Holm; 9 December 1943 (age 82); Stockholm, Sweden
- Other names: Larry Moon
- Occupations: Singer; songwriter; television host
- Years active: 1959–present
- Musical career
- Genres: Dansband; pop; rock; schlager
- Instruments: Vocals; piano

Lars-Eric Gustav "Lasse" Holm (born 9 December 1943) is a Swedish singer, songwriter and television host.

Holm has also hosted and appeared in several television shows.

== As singer ==
Since childhood, he was interested in music and was a member of a lot of pop music and rock music groups in the 1960s: Doug and the Millsmen, The Spacemen and The Moonlighters.

Holm and singer Monica Törnell represented Sweden in the Eurovision Song Contest 1986 with the song "E' de' det här du kallar kärlek".

== As songwriter ==
Holm is best known as a schlager composer. During the 1980s, he was a songwriter for Chips and country band Mats Rådberg & Rankarna. Holm often collaborated with Ingela 'Pling' Forsman

Holm has, by himself or in collaboration with others, written five winning songs in the Swedish Melodifestivalen: "Dag efter dag" by (Chips, 1982), "Främling" (Carola Häggkvist, 1983), "Bra vibrationer" by (Kikki Danielsson, 1985), "E' de' det här du kallar kärlek" (a duet by Holm and Monica Törnell, 1986) and "Eloise" by (Arvingarna, 1993).

Lasse Holm was (along with ABBA, Kiss, Prince) highlighted as an inspiration when Max Martin accepted the 2016 Polar Music Prize.

== As television host ==
Holm has hosted a number of Swedish TV shows such as Sikta mot stjärnorna broadcast on TV4, Pictionary and Diggiloo broadcast on SVT.

== Notable songs ==
- "Miss Decibel" (Wizex and Lasse Holm, placed second in Melodifestivalen 1978)
- "Växeln hallå" (Janne Lucas Persson, placed second in Melodifestivalen 1980)
- "Då lyser en sol" (Elisabeth Andreassen, 1981)
- "God morgon" (Sweets 'n' Chips, placed second in Melodifestivalen 1981)
- "Dag efter dag" (Chips, won Melodifestivalen 1982)
- "Främling" (Carola Häggkvist, won Melodifestivalen 1983)
- "Bra vibrationer" by (Kikki Danielsson, won Melodifestivalen 1985)
- "Sommarparty" (Herreys, won the Sopot Music Festival Grand Prix in 1985)
- "E' de' det här du kallar kärlek" (Lasse Holm and Monica Törnell, won Melodifestivalen 1986)
- "Papaya Coconut" (Kikki Danielsson, 1986)
- "Canelloni, Macaroni" (Lasse Holm, 1986)
- "Inget stoppar oss nu", also known as "Inget kan stoppa oss nu" or "I natt, i natt" (Haakon Pedersen 1987, Canyons orkester 1989, BlackJack 1990)
- "Högt över havet", (Arja Saijonmaa, placed second in Melodifestivalen 1987 and won the OGAE Second Chance Contest)
- "Nästa weekend" (Uffe Persson, Melodifestivalen 1988)
- "Nattens drottning" (Haakon Pedersen & Elisabeth Berg, Melodifestivalen 1989)
- "Nu tar vi dom" (Sweden men's national ice hockey team, 1989)
- "Ciao ciao Italia" (Sweden men's national football team, 1990)
- "Varje natt", (Lisbet Jagedal, placed third in Melodifestivalen 1990)
- "Handen på hjärtat" (Sofia Källgren, placed fourth in Melodifestivalen 1990)
- "Eloise" (Arvingarna, won Melodifestivalen 1993)
- "Bo Diddley" (Arvingarna, Melodifestivalen 1995)
- "Du är alltid en del utav mig" (Henrik Åberg, Melodifestivalen 1996)
- "När jag tänker på i morgon" (Friends, placed second in Melodifestivalen 2000)
- "För det här är bara början" (Elisa's, 2010)
- "Don't Let Me Down" (Lotta Engberg & Christer Sjögren, Melodifestivalen 2012)

Awards and achievements
Preceded by Kikki Danielsson with "Bra vibrationer"	Sweden in the Eurovision Song Contest (with Monica Törnell); 1986	Succeeded by Lotta Engberg with "Boogaloo"
