= Dag efter dag =

1982 song by Chips

Single by Chips
- Language: Swedish
- Released: 1982
- Composer: Lasse Holm
- Lyricist: Monica Forsberg

Eurovision Song Contest 1982 entry
- Country: Sweden
- Artists: Elisabeth Andreassen; Kikki Danielsson
- As: Chips
- Language: Swedish
- Composer: Lasse Holm
- Lyricist: Monica Forsberg
- Conductor: Anders Berglund

Finals performance
- Final result: 8th
- Final points: 67

Entry chronology
- ◄ "Fångad i en dröm" (1981)
- "Främling" (1983) ►

"Dag efter dag" (Swedish pronunciation: [ˈdɑː(ɡ) ɛftɛ ˈɖɑː(ɡ)]; "Day after day") is a song written by Lasse Holm with lyrics by Monica Forsberg, and performed by the pop and country group Chips (Kikki Danielsson and Elisabeth Andreassen). The song won the Melodifestivalen 1982 and represented Sweden in the Eurovision Song Contest 1982, finishing eighth.

On 18 April 1982 the song reached first place on Svensktoppen, where it stayed for nine rounds. On 13 June 1982 the song was the last to be number one on Svensktoppen, before the program was removed the first time. Chips also recorded the song with lyrics in English, "Day after Day".

== Charts ==
In 1982, "Dag efter dag" was also released as a single. The single reached 4th place in the Swedish singles chart and 5th place in the Norwegian singles chart.

Sweden Top 20
| Week | 6 April 1982 | 20 April 1982 | 4 May 1982 | 18 May 1982 | 1 June 1982 | 15 June 1982 |
|---|---|---|---|---|---|---|
| Position | 7 | 4 | 6 | 6 | 10 | 8 |

Norway Top 10
| Week | 14 1982 | 15 1982 | 16 1982 | 17 1982 | 18 1982 |
|---|---|---|---|---|---|
| Position | 9 | 9 | 9 | 5 | 5 |

| Chart (1982) | Peak position |
|---|---|
| Belgium (Ultratop Flanders) | 35 |
| Finland (Suomen virallinen lista) | 18 |
| Norway (VG-lista) | 5 |
| Sweden (Sverigetopplistan) | 4 |
| Sweden (Svensktoppen) | 1 |

== Personnel ==
- Bass – Rutger Gunnarsson
- Drums – "Hulken"
- Piano – Lasse Holm
- Saxophone – Hans Arktoft, Hector Bingert, Ulf Andersson
- Strings – Rutger Gunnarsson

== Cover versions ==
- In 1982, local cover versions were recorded by Meiju Suvas: "A huu – a heijaa" (Finnish); and by Zdenka Vučković: "Prolazi dan" (Croatian, "A Day Passes").
- Dansband Ingmar Nordströms covered the song on their 1987 album Saxparty 15.
- During the Siste Sjansen round of Melodi Grand Prix 2009, Elisabeth Andreassen, one half of the group Chips, came on stage and sang it with 3 women, who recreated the outfit the group wore at Melodifestivalen in 1982, three saxophone players and a school choir.

| Preceded by Fångad i en dröm by Björn Skifs | Melodifestivalen winners 1982 | Succeeded by Främling by Carola Häggkvist |
