= History of Melodifestivalen =

Melodifestivalen (Swedish pronunciation: [mɛlʊˈdîːfɛstɪˌvɑːlɛn]; lit. 'the Melody Festival') is an annual song competition organised by Swedish public broadcasters Sveriges Television (SVT) and Sveriges Radio (SR). It determines the country's representative for the Eurovision Song Contest, and has been staged almost every year since 1959, barring 1964 when no competition was held due to an artists' strike.

== Overview ==
=== Early experiments (1958–1969) ===
Following Sveriges Radio's internal selection of Alice Babs as Sweden's representative for Eurovision 1958,^{[c]} the first Melodifestival, incorporated into the Säg det med musik radio series, took place on 29 January 1959 at Cirkus in Stockholm with four "expert" juries deciding the winner. The competition was won by Siw Malmkvist performing "Augustin", but SR decided beforehand that the winning song—regardless of original performer—would be performed by Brita Borg at Eurovision. The policy of selecting the artist for Eurovision internally and having other artists perform contest entries at Melodifestival was adopted in 1960. In the early years of the event, it was broadcast to Norway and Denmark via the Nordvision network. The competition also became a stand-alone television event in 1960, as the Eurovisionschlagern, svensk final. A new format was imported from the Sanremo Music Festival, in which the participating songs were performed by two artists; one with a large orchestra and another with a smaller jazz quartet.

The changes meant that the 1960s winning song, "Alla andra får varann", was performed by three artists: Östen Warnerbring and Inger Berggren at Melodifestivalen, and Siw Malmkvist at Eurovision in London. This name and format was retained until 1963, when Sweden scored their first and only Eurovision "nul points" with "En gång i Stockholm" performed by Monica Zetterlund. The 1960 and 1963 competitions both included an informal semi-final, where a panel of judges would listen to the participating performers and select songs to go through to the televised final. Sweden did not participate in the Eurovision Song Contest in 1964 due to an artists' strike, so no competition was held that year.

The 1965 competition marked a change in attitude at SR, with less focus on performers and more focus on songwriters. The competition was now known as the Svensk sångfinal. Ingvar Wixell performed all six songs in contention, a format that was dropped the following year. Wixell performed the winning song "Annorstädes vals" in English at the Eurovision Song Contest as "Absent Friends", making Sweden the first country to perform entirely in a non-native language at the Contest.^{[d]} Lill Lindfors and Svante Thuresson won the 1966 competition and finished second at Eurovision, which remained the best outcome in the Contest for Sweden until 1974. The competition adopted its current name, Melodifestivalen, in 1967. Demonstrations outside Cirkus marred the festival in 1969—that year's Eurovision was to be held in Madrid, capital of Francoist Spain, which led protesters to believe that Sweden should stage a boycott.

=== ABBA and Alternativfestivalen (1970–1982) ===
Due to a Nordic boycott of the voting system that led to a four-way tie for first place at the 1969 Contest, Sweden was absent at Eurovision for a second time in 1970. In 1971, Melodifestivalen organised as part of the Hylands hörna television series. Five semi-finals broadcast; three acts—Tommy Körberg, Family Four and Sylvia Vrethammar—performed one song in each. Family Four received the most postcard votes in all of the semi-finals. Accordingly, all five songs in the final were performed by them (an accidental repeat of the 1965 scenario with Ingvar Wixell). The first act to win the competition twice running, Family Four won Melodifestivalen again in 1972 against nine competitors.

The 1974 winner, "Waterloo" by ABBA, is considered the most popular Melodifestivalen and Eurovision song of all time, and earned Sweden their first Eurovision win. "Waterloo" was voted the most popular Eurovision song at a fiftieth anniversary concert in late 2005. ABBA was not new to performing at the festival. Anni-Frid Lyngstad performed solo in 1969, and the group participated in the 1973 competition as Agnetha, Anni-Frid, Björn & Benny singing "Ring Ring". Björn Ulvaeus and Benny Andersson wrote four Melodifestivalen songs in total, three of which were co-written by ABBA's manager, Stikkan Andersson. After SR staged the 1975 Eurovision Song Contest in Stockholm, it was argued by left-wing groups that Sweden could not afford to win and host the Contest again. This led to mass demonstrations against commercial music and the organisation of an anti-commercial Alternativfestivalen. Sweden therefore could not send a song to Eurovision 1976, the third and most recent time the country abstained from participating.

Melodifestivalen returned in 1977 with almost exactly the same format used in 1975. The introduction of the voting system adopted by Eurovision in 1975 was the only major change. Sweden's success at Eurovision markedly worsened following the 1976 boycott. The country failed to break into the top ten between 1977 and 1981. The down time for Sweden became a period that witnessed the most tensely contested rivalries in the history of the competition, that of Björn Skifs and the pairing of Lasse Holm and Kikki Danielsson. In the 1978 final, following a tie break, Skifs' song won victory over Danielsson and Holm (performing with Wizex). The two competed against each other again in 1981 when Skifs' song beat Chips—a band featuring Danielsson with a song written by Holm—by two points. When Chips won in 1982 with "Dag efter dag", Danielsson joked that they won that year because Björn Skifs did not take part.

=== New format, prolonged success (1983–1991) ===
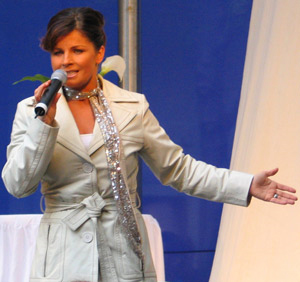
Carola Häggkvist won Melodifestivalen in 1983, 1991 and 2006. In 1991 she won the Eurovision Song Contest.

Sweden's most successful period at Eurovision was between 1983 and 1991. The country achieved four top three finishes—two more than it had accumulated in the previous twenty-five years—with two victories among them. The voting system used at Melodifestivalen during most of this period was introduced in 1982. It remained in use intermittently until 1998, later becoming synonymous with the event and the basis for the modern semifinal format. The regional juries narrowed the contenders down to five, giving the contestants the opportunity to perform their songs again in a second round before the juries voted again to find a winner.

Not reaching the final five under the new format was seen as a major failure for an artist. When Elisabeth Andreassen failed to qualify in 1984, it almost ended her career. The same format can also make a success of an artist. Melodifestivalen 1983 was Carola Häggkvist's breakthrough as a singer. A 16-year-old singer from Norsborg, she won with "Främling" by earning the maximum eight points from all eleven juries. Häggkvist was one of a long list of Melodifestivalen winners managed by Bert Karlsson's Mariann Grammofon label. "Främling" finished third at Eurovision 1983, and the single sold one million copies.

Sweden won Eurovision for the second time in 1984 with talent-show winners Herreys—brothers Per, Louis and Richard Herrey—singing "Diggi-loo diggi-ley". In 1982 and between 1984 and 1987, the voting juries were sorted by age rather than locality. Audience viewing reached record numbers for Melodifestivalen in 1990 (over five million viewers saw Edin-Ådahl beat Carola Häggkvist to win the competition). Häggkvist—now performing as simply Carola—took part for a third time in 1991 with "Fångad av en stormvind", which won with 78 of a possible 88 points. In a tie-break with the French song, she won Eurovision in Rome later that same year. The win was Sweden's third victory of thirty-one attempts at the Contest.

=== Decline in popularity (1992–2001) ===
Sweden's Eurovision results generally remained consistent after Carola's win. However, the popularity of Melodifestivalen went into decline. Christer Björkman won in 1992, but finished second last at the Eurovision Song Contest in Malmö. Until host country Austria scored nil points in 2015, this was tied for the worst result for a host country in the Contest's history.

Televoting was introduced experimentally in the 1993 festival, but proved unsuccessful. The Swedish telephone network collapsed under the strain caused by the lack of success and later claims by the Swedish tabloid press that suggested the use of televoting had skewed the results. The evening newspapers released what they claimed to be the back-up juries' votes, which showed that the winner, Arvingarna's "Eloise", would have only finished fourth had the juries' votes counted. SVT never confirmed the accuracy of these claims. The regional juries were reinstated in 1994, which was the same year that Marie Bergman became the first singer to win Melodifestivalen three times.^{[e]}

Although the competition was only 36 years old, SVT chose to coincide Melodifestivalen's fortieth anniversary with the fortieth Eurovision Song Contest in 1995. A documentary about the competition's history was broadcast and hosted by Björn Kjellman. The 1998 Contest was the last time in which jury votes alone decided the winner. In 1999, televoting was reintroduced permanently. However, unlike in 1993, the juries were retained and their votes counted for 50% of the final marks. Charlotte Nilsson's "Tusen och en natt" was the most popular song judged by both juries and televoters. The song went on to win the 1999 Eurovision in Jerusalem (Sweden's fourth Eurovision win). The win boosted the popularity of Melodifestivalen. The 2000 competition of the following year attracted the most viewers since 1993. That year was the final year in which a live orchestra performed. Melodifestivalen 2001 was won by Friends with "Lyssna till ditt hjärta". The win was the first time a reality TV music act won the competition.

=== From one evening to six weeks (2002–present) ===
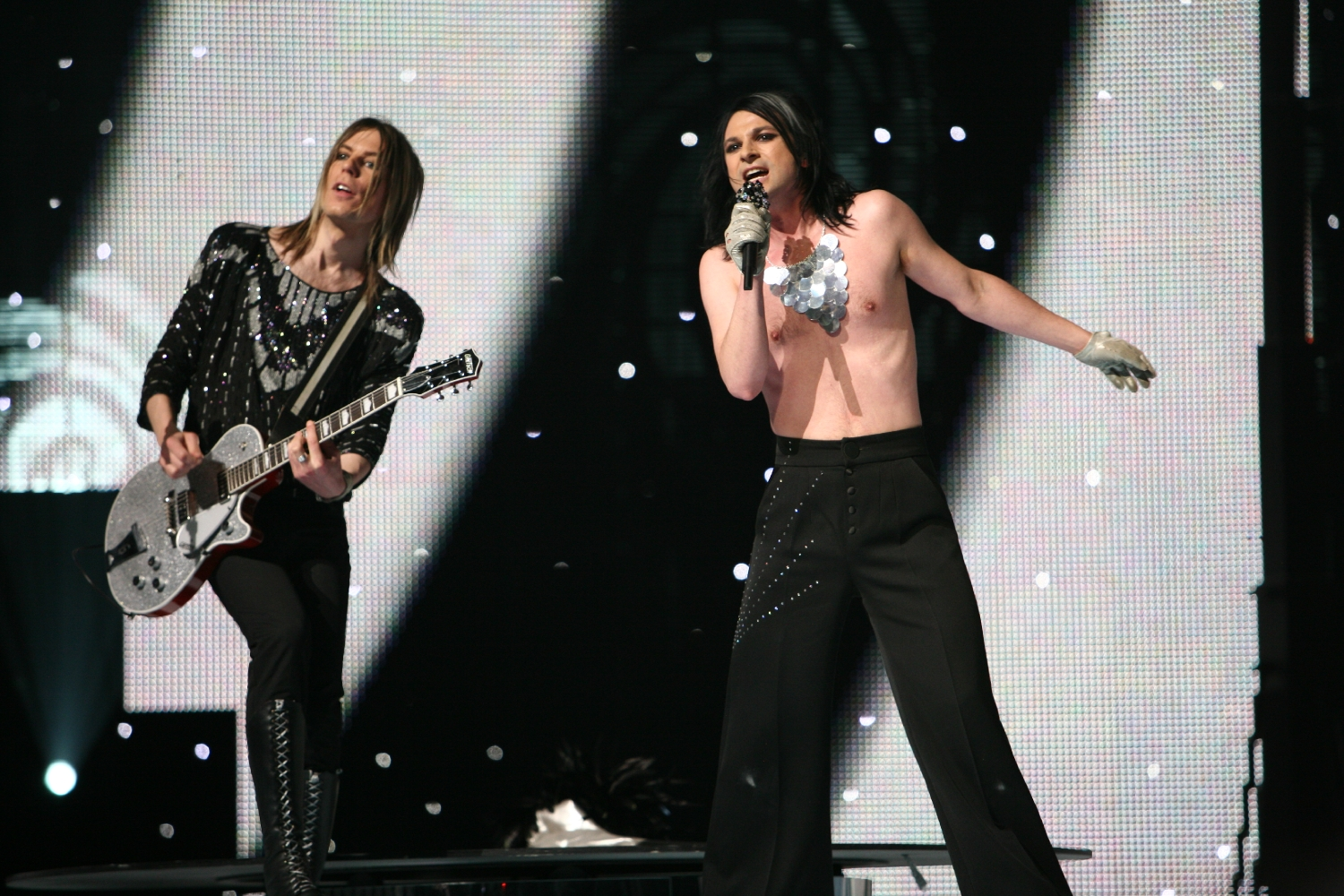
Melodifestivalen 2007 winners The Ark performing "The Worrying Kind" at that year's Eurovision Song Contest in Helsinki.

Svante Stockselius, head of SVT's entertainment division, became a driving force behind a revamp of Melodifestivalen. Christer Björkman, winner of the 1992 festival, was appointed supervisor of the competition for 2002 and began a process of modernising the event. The competition was extended from one night to five weeks with an additional four heats and a smaller Second Chance round bringing the number of participants up 32, which is more than threefold the normal participant count. Songs in languages other than Swedish were allowed for the first time, thus opening an opportunity for 15 of that year's contestants.

Also during this period, the final moved to the 16,000-seater Stockholm Globe Arena, which, in 1989, was believed too big to stage the competition when it was held there. The new heat system meant that the competition could "tour" the country, taking advantage of Sweden's ice hockey stadia. Given a touring competition, it was the first time the competition had moved outside Stockholm, Gothenburg and Malmö; this led to the 2002 festival being described as the "folkliga Melodifestivalen" (people's Melodifestival.) A compilation CD of the competition's entries has been released since 2001, and a DVD of the heats and the final competition has been released since 2003.

A children's competition, Lilla Melodifestivalen, started in 2002. The festival serves as the Swedish selection competition for the Melodi Grand Prix Nordic. Until 2005, the competition also served to select the Swedish entry for the Junior Eurovision Song Contest.

The 2004 competition introduced a wildcard system where four artists are invited to take part in the competition by SVT. Lena Philipsson, who had previously lost the competition three times in the 1980s, was one of the first wildcards and won in 2004. As in 1995, SVT chose to celebrate the fiftieth anniversary of the competition in 2005, the same year Eurovision reached a half-century of competitions, for which two commemorative DVDs were released. A gala was held at Cirkus to determine the most popular Melodifestivalen song ever, a title which was won by ABBA's "Waterloo".

In 2005, the voting system caused controversy at the final after Martin Stenmarck won the competition by three points over Nanne Grönvall, despite Grönvall receiving over 150,000 more televotes. The juries and televoters disagreed on the winner again in 2006, but the most popular act with the public, Carola, won the competition on this occasion. The Second Chance round was revamped into a full Saturday night show with a knock-out format for 2007. While the competition's expansion had a huge impact in Sweden (over two million votes were cast in the 2007 final, against just under 360,000 in 2001), Sweden's competitiveness at Eurovision was not improving in the same way until Eric Saade's third-place finish in 2011. The following year, in 2012, Loreen's "Euphoria" won Melodifestivalen with a record-breaking number of over 670,000 televotes. Loreen won Eurovision in Baku later that same year, Sweden's fifth victory at the Contest.

== By year ==
=== 1950s ===
1958: Schlagertävling — Sweden made its debut at Eurovision at the third contest, held in Hilversum. In order to select a participant, Sveriges Radio and SKAP, the Swedish Society of Popular Music Composers, came together to choose an entrant internally. Among the entrants was Stig Anderson, but the song selected to represent Sweden was "Lilla stjärna", performed by Alice Babs.

1959: Säg det med musik: Stora schlagertävlingen — The first Melodifestivalen proper took place at Cirkus in Stockholm in January 1959. SR has decided that Brita Borg would represent Sweden in the international final prior to the competition, so the televised final only served as a selection for the song. The winning song was "Augustin", originally performed by Siw Malmkvist.

=== 1960s ===
1960: Eurovisionschlagern, svensk final — Once again, the final only selecting the song for Eurovision. A semi-final was held for the first time. This year, Göte Wilhelmsons kvartett was used as an alternative orchestra, meaning that there were two performers for each song (in addition to a potential third performer at Eurovision.) The winning song was "Alla andra får varann" performed with the large orchestra by Östen Warnerbring and with the kvartett by Inger Berggren. Siw Malmkvist performed the song at Eurovision.

1961: Eurovisionschlagern, svensk final — This year, it was planned that the winning artist and song be selected in the televised final, but due to criticism of Siw Malmkvist's reprise performance she was replaced with Lill-Babs.

1962: Eurovisionschalgern, svensk final — Postcard voting decided the winner. Inger Berggren won with "Sol och vår" and, unlike in previous years, she also represented Sweden at Eurovision.

1963: Eurovisionschlagern, svensk final — Once again a semi-final was held. This was the last year in which Göte Wilhelmsons kvintett (formerly a kvartett) was used. Monica Zetterlund won with "En gång i Stockholm", which became Sweden's first and only "nul points" in Eurovision.

1964: No competition — No competition was held in 1964 due to a recording artists' strike.

1965: Svensk sångfinal — All of the finalists were performed by Ingvar Wixell. The winning song was "Annorstädes vals", which was performed at Eurovision as "Absent Friends".

1966: Svensk sångfinal — The one-artist approach was scrapped, and Lill Lindfors and Svante Thuresson won with "Nygammal vals". They finished second at Eurovision in Luxembourg, which remained Sweden's best Eurovision result until ABBA's victory in 1974.

1967: Melodifestival — The first year in which the competition was known as Melodifestivalen. Östen Warnerbring won with "Som en dröm".

1968: Melodifestival — No changes to the format of the competition. Claes-Göran Hederström won with "Det börjar verka kärlek, banne mig".

1969: Melodifestival — For the first time, there was a tie in the final. Tommy Körberg, performing "Judy, min vän", and Jan Malmsjö, performing "Hej clown", tied for first place, but a count-back of the regional juries decided that Körberg would go to Eurovision in Madrid.

=== 1970s ===
1970: No competition — There was no Melodifestival in 1970 as a protest by the Nordic broadcasters over the voting system at the Eurovision Song Contest, which had produced a four-way tie between France, the United Kingdom, the Netherlands and Spain the previous year.

1971: Melodifestival — This year's competition was broadcast as part of the Hylands hörna television series. Five semi-finals were held, and three artists participated in each; Tommy Körberg, Family Four and Sylvia Vrethammar. Family Four won all five semis, and thus had all five songs in the final. Regional juries decided the winner, which was "Vita vidder".

1972: Melodifestival — Family Four win with "Härliga sommerdag", becoming the first act to win two years running.

1973: Melodifestival — Malta won with "Sommaren som aldrig säger nej", performed in Eurovision as "You're Summer". ABBA participate for the first time with "Ring Ring", finishing third.

1974: Melodifestival — ABBA win with "Waterloo". They go on to win the Eurovision Song Contest in Brighton, becoming Sweden's first Eurovision winner. The group's winning score at the Melodifestival, 302 points, remains a record.

1975: Melodifestival — For the first time, the event is held outside of Stockholm, this time in Gothenburg. Lasse Berghagen wins with "Jennie, Jennie".

1976: No competition — Following the Eurovision Song Contest 1975, held in Stockholm, there are criticisms that the contest makes too much of an impact on SR's budget to be viable. This leads to protests against commercial music, and another Swedish Eurovision pull-out. This is Sweden's third and most recent boycott.

1977: Melodifestival — Melodifestivalen returned, with very few changes. Forbes won with "Beatles", an hommage to the British group of the same name. They became the second act to finish last at Eurovision for Sweden.

1978: Melodifestival — For the second time, there is a tie for first place: this time between the grouping of Lasse Holm, Kikki Danielsson and Wizex, and Björn Skifs. Following a count-back from the eleven regional juries, Skifs is declared the winner with "Det blir alltid värre framåt natten".

1979: Melodifestival — This year's festival marks the participation of numerous well-known faces in Swedish music: Py Bäckman, Ted Gärdestad, Magnus Uggla and Eva Dahlgren. Gärdestad wins with "Satellit".

=== 1980s ===
1980: Melodifestival — Tomas Ledin wins with "Just nu".

1981: Melodifestival — Another close finish, this time two points separate victorious Björn Skifs with "Fångad i en dröm" and Sweets 'n' Chips with "God morgon".

1982: Melodifestival — For the first time, the competition is held at a sports venue, the Lisebergshallen in Gothenburg. The "superfinal" is introduced, whereby the ten participants are narrowed down to five by the regional juries. Chips win with "Dag efter dag".

1983: Melodifestival — Carola wins with "Främling", becoming the first act to score top marks from all of the regional juries.

1984: Melodifestival — Herreys win with "Diggi-loo diggi-ley", going to win that year's Eurovision in Luxembourg. They are Sweden's second Eurovision winner.

1985: Melodifestival — For the first time, there is no orchestra. All of the participants are performed to backing track. Kikki Danielsson wins with "Bra vibrationer".

1986: Melodifestival — This is the final year in which the competition is not broadcast on radio. Music videos of the entries are produced, and broadcast instead of a live performance in the first round. Once again, there is no orchestra. Lasse Holm & Monica Törnell win with "É dé det här du kallar kärlek?".

1987: Melodifestival — The orchestra returns. For the first time, the competition is broadcast on Sveriges Radio P3 with commentary. Lotta Engberg wins with "Fyra bugg och en coca-cola", which has its title changed to "Boogaloo (dansa rock 'n' roll)" for Eurovision.

1988: Melodifestival — Tommy Körberg wins with "Stad i ljus".

1989: Melodifestival — For the first time, the competition is held at the Stockholm Globe Arena. Tommy Nilsson wins with "En dag".

=== 1990s ===
1990: Melodifestival — The competition is held at Rondo in Gothenburg, a much smaller venue to the Globe Arena which hosted it the previous year. This year is, according to recorded viewing figures, the most watched Melodifestival in the event's history. Edin-Ådahl win with "Som en vind".

1991: Melodifestival — Carola wins with "Fångad av en stormvind". The song goes on to be Sweden's third Eurovision winner, beating France following a tie-break.

1992: Melodifestival — The last Melodifestivalen to be held at Cirkus. Christer Björkman wins with "Imorgon är en annan dag".

1993: Melodifestival — Televoting introduced as an experiment, with controversial results: Arvingarna win with "Eloise", however a tabloid report following the event claims that had juries decided the winner, Nick Borgen would have won the ticket to Millstreet with "We Are All the Winners".

1994: Melodifestivalen — For the first time, the name Melodifestivalen (as opposed to the Melodifestival) is used as the official name for the competition by SVT. Roger Pontare and Marie Bergman win with "Stjärnorna".

1995: Melodifestival — Jan Johansen wins with "Se på mig", beating Cecilia Vennersten into second place.

1996: Melodifestival — One More Time win with "Den vilda". The group are hailed as "the new ABBA" (indeed one of the group's members, Peter Grönvall, is the son of Benny Andersson), they finish a respectable 3rd in Oslo.

1997: Melodifestival — Blond win with "Bara hon älskar mig".

1998: Melodifestival — Jill Johnson wins with "Kärleken är". Nanne Grönvall, a winner in 1996, participates for the first time as a soloist with "Avundsjuk".

1999: Melodifestival — A new voting system was introduced. Charlotte Nilsson wins with "Tusen och en natt", going on to become Sweden's fourth Eurovision winner.

=== 2000s ===
2000: Melodifestival — Roger Pontare wins with "När vindarna viskar mitt namn". The final event to include an orchestra.

2001: Melodifestival — Friends win with "Lyssna till ditt hjärta". The song is later confirmed as plagiarism of the Belgian entry to the Eurovision Song Contest 1996, "Liefde is een kaartspel".

2002: Melodifestivalen — The current heat system is introduced. Song in languages other than Swedish are allowed in the competition for the first time. Afro-dite win with "Never Let it Go".

2003: Melodifestivalen — Fame win with "Give Me Your Love".

2004: Melodifestivalen — The wildcard system is introduced. Lena Philipsson wins with "Det gör ont", performed at Eurovision as "It Hurts".

2005: Melodifestivalen — Martin Stenmarck wins with "Las Vegas", despite finishing second in the televote to Nanne Grönvall.

2006: Melodifestivalen — Carola wins for the third time with "Evighet", performed at Eurovision as "Invincible".

2007: Melodifestivalen — An expanded Second Chance round takes place for the first time. The Ark win with "The Worrying Kind".

2008: Melodifestivalen — Charlotte Perrelli wins for the second time with "Hero".

2009: Melodifestivalen — Inclusion of duels in the heats, pre-recorded backing vocals, up to eight people on stage, and an international jury, who select an 11th finalist, and votes in the final as the 12th jury. Malena Ernman wins with "La Voix".

=== 2010s ===
2010: Melodifestivalen — A web wildcard is included, featuring unsigned acts competing on the internet for the final place in Melodifestivalen – the winner is selected by SMS voting. Anna Bergendahl wins the competition with "This Is My Life", going on to become the only Swedish entry to date not to qualify for the Eurovision final.

2011: Melodifestivalen — Web wildcard competition expanded, television final in November – two acts selected for heats. Proportional representation introduced for televoting in final, each song given share of 473 points based on percentage of total televote. Foreign songwriters are allowed for the first time, provided the songs have at least one Swedish writer. Eric Saade wins, in his second consecutive participation, with "Popular".

2012: Melodifestivalen — Web wildcard competition downsized – one song selected for heats. Loreen wins with "Euphoria" in her second consecutive participation, going on to become Sweden's fifth Eurovision winner.

2013: Melodifestivalen — Web wildcard competition discontinued. Robin Stjernberg wins with "You" and becomes the first winner from the Second Chance round.

2014: Melodifestivalen — Sanna Nielsen wins with "Undo" in her seventh participation.

2015: Melodifestivalen — The total number of competing entries is reduced from 32 to 28. A new rule states that at least 50% of selected entries must be written or co-written by at least one female songwriter. Måns Zelmerlöw wins with "Heroes" in his third Melodifestivalen participation. He goes on to become Sweden's sixth Eurovision winner.

2016: Melodifestivalen – Frans wins the competition with "If I Were Sorry", in his first public appearance on the music scene since 2006.

2017: Melodifestivalen – Robin Bengtsson wins with "I Can't Go On" in his second consecutive participation.

2018: Melodifestivalen – Benjamin Ingrosso wins with "Dance You Off" in his second consecutive participation; he had previously won Lilla Melodifestivalen in 2006, and became the first Lilla Melodifestivalen winner to win its parent competition.

2019: Melodifestivalen – John Lundvik wins with "Too Late for Love" in his second consecutive participation.

=== 2020s ===
2020: Melodifestivalen – The Mamas win with "Move" in their first participation, after previously providing backing vocals for John Lundvik in 2019. This marks the first time in history that the winner of Melodifestivalen did not participate in the Eurovision Song Contest, as the contest itself was cancelled due to the COVID-19 pandemic.

2021: Melodifestivalen – Tusse wins with "Voices" in his first participation.

2022: Melodifestivalen – The Second Chance round is replaced by a semi-final, where the eight competing entries are divided into two groups, with the top two songs from each proceeding to the final. Cornelia Jakobs wins with "Hold Me Closer" in her first participation as a solo artist, after previously participating as part of Love Generation in 2011 and 2012.

2023: Melodifestivalen – The eight entries in the semi-final compete in a single group, with the top four songs proceeding to the final. Loreen wins with "Tattoo" in her fourth Melodifestivalen participation. She goes on to become Sweden's seventh Eurovision winner, and the second performer as well as the first female artist to win Eurovision more than once.

2024: Melodifestivalen – The total number of competing entries is increased from 28 to 30. The semi-final is replaced by a 30-minute section of the newly introduced fifth heat, where the top two songs proceeding to the final. Marcus & Martinus win with "Unforgettable" in their second consecutive participation.

2025: Melodifestivalen – KAJ wins with "Bara bada bastu" in their first participation, being the first winning song in the Swedish language since 2006.

2026: Melodifestivalen – Felicia wins with "My System" in her first participation as a solo artist, after previously participating under the moniker Fröken Snusk in 2024.

== Venues ==
=== Final ===
City	Venues (years)	Total
Stockholm	Stockholms Cirkusteater (1958–1963, 1965–1969, 1972, 1977–1979, 1981, 1986, 1992); SVT Television Centre (1971, 1973–1974, 1980, 1994); Avicii Arena (1989, 2002–2012); Stockholm International Fairs (1996, 1999); Strawberry Arena (2013–2020, 2022–today); Annexet (2021)	49
Gothenburg	SVT Television Centre (1975); Lisebergshallen (1982, 1984, 1987, 1993); Rondo (1990); Eriksbergshallen (1997); Gothenburg Opera (2000)	8
Malmö	Palladium (1983); SVT Television Centre (1985); Malmö Musikteater (1988, 1991, 1995, 1998, 2001)	7

=== Venues (since 2002) ===
City	Venue	Year																								
City	Venue	2002	2003	2004	2005	2006	2007	2008	2009	2010	2011	2012	2013	2014	2015	2016	2017	2018	2019	2020	2021	2022	2023	2024	2025	2026
Eskilstuna	Stiga Sports Arena																			SC				H		
Falun	Lugnet	H																								
Gothenburg	Scandinavium		H	H	H	H	H	H	H	H	H	H	H	H	H	H	H	H	H	H			H	H	H	H
Gävle	Monitor ERP Arena						H									H										
Halmstad	Halmstad Arena															SC										
Helsingborg	Helsingborg Arena														SC											
Jönköping	Elmia		H																							
Jönköping	Husqvarna Garden						H																		H	
Karlskrona	NKT Arena					H		H					H													
Karlstad	Löfbergs Arena			H		H							SC					H						H		
Kiruna	Arena Arctica							SC																		
Kristianstad	Kristianstad Arena																	SC								H
Leksand	Tegera Arena					H			H			H							H							
Lidköping	Sparbanken Lidköping Arena													SC					H				H			
Linköping	Saab Arena				H			H			H			H			SC			H			H			H
Luleå	Arcushallen		H																							
Luleå	Coop Norrbotten Arena										H									H					H	
Malmö	Malmö Arena								H	H	H	H	H	H	H	H	H	H	H	H			H	H	H	H
Malmö	Malmömässan			H																						
Norrköping	Himmelstalundshallen	H							SC							H										
Nyköping	Rosvalla Eventcenter						SC					SC							SC							
Örebro	Conventum Arena									SC					H											
Örnsköldsvik	Hägglunds Arena						H			H				H				H					SF			
Östersund	Östersund Arena														H											
Sandviken	Göransson Arena									H																
Skellefteå	Skellefteå Kraft Arena				H				H				H				H									
Stockholm	Annexet																				ALL					
Stockholm	Avicii Arena	F	F	F	F	F	F	F	F	F	F	F										H				
Stockholm	Berns Salonger				SC																					
Stockholm	Hotel Rival			SC																						
Stockholm	Strawberry Arena												F	F	F	F	F	F	F	F		H SF; F	F	F	F	F
Stockholm	SVT Television Centre	SC	SC			SC																				
Sundsvall	Nordichallen	H	H								SC															H
Umeå	Winpos Arena			H																						
Västerås	ABB Arena							H																	H	
Växjö	Tipshallen	H			H																					
Växjö	Vida Arena											H					H							H		

H = Heat, SC = Second Chance, SF = Semi-final, F = Final, ALL = All shows

== See also ==
- Melodifestivalen winners
- Voting at Melodifestivalen
- Sweden in the Eurovision Song Contest
- Sveriges Television
- List of Melodifestivalen presenters
