= Voting at Melodifestivalen =

Swedish Eurovision song selection system

Melodifestivalen is a music competition organised by Swedish public broadcasters Sveriges Television (SVT) and Sveriges Radio (SR) to determine the country's representative in the Eurovision Song Contest. The voting procedures to select the entrant for the annual contest have varied over the years since the country's debut in 1958. The Swedish broadcasters have experimented with techniques including splitting the juries by age, regional voting, and using an "expert" jury. Televoting was controversially first introduced in 1993, as an unannounced experiment. The Swedish telephone network promptly collapsed under the strain of phone calls being made.

Televoting was permanently reintroduced in 1999, but the regional jury system was retained, and given a 50% weighting in the overall results. In 2011, the regional juries were abolished and their task was given to juries from other countries that participate in the year's Eurovision Song Contest. 2015 saw the introduction of a mobile app that allowed the public to vote for their favourite entries for free. The current voting system has been the subject of controversy on several occasions, as it is possible for the song which receives the most votes from the public not to win, as happened in 2005, 2008, 2013, 2017 and 2022.

The current televoting and app-voting record is 26,072,328 votes in the Melodifestivalen 2025 final.

== Summary of voting systems used ==
Year(s)	Voting system
1959–1961	Four expert juries in Stockholm, Gothenburg, Malmö and Luleå.
1962	Postcard voting.
1963	As 1959–1961.
1965–1969	Regional juries in each of Sveriges Radio's regions. One point per jury member.
1971	Postcard voting in the three heats. Regional juries in each of Sveriges Radio's regions decided the final.
1972–1973	As 1965–1969.
1974–1975	Eleven regional juries, each with fifteen people. Each jury member awarded 3, 2 and 1 point(s) to their three favourite songs. This led to ABBA winning with 302 points, the largest total ever (impossible under the current system.) In 1975 the number of jury members was reduced from fifteen to ten, and they were allowed to award five points in any manner they wished.
1977–1980	Regional juries. The positional voting system used in the Eurovision Song Contest at the time was used. Each jury awarded one to eight points, ten and finally twelve.
1981–1988	Regional juries. Juries each awarded 1, 2, 4, 6 and eight points to the five songs. In 1982 the number of contestants was increased to ten once again and a first round vote was used to reduce that number to five for the "super final". In 1982 and from 1984 to 1987 the juries were sorted by age, not region, but the voting system remained the same. Regional juries returned in 1988.
1989–1990	As 1977–1980.
1991–1992	As 1981–1988 with regional juries.
1993	A regional televote in which the regions' points were given in the same manner as the previous two competitions: 1, 2, 4, 6 and 8.
1994–1996	As 1981–1988 with regional juries.
1997	Regional juries. Juries awarded 1, 2, 4, 6, 8, 10 and 12 points to their top seven songs.
1998	As 1981–1988 with regional juries.
1999–2008	Juries voted as in 1997. Televoting points are given by multiplying the juries' points allocations (1, 2, 4, 6, 8, 10 and 12) by the total number of juries - so with eleven juries, 11, 22, 44, 66, 88, 110 and 132 - to give a 50:50 jury-public points split
2009	As in 1999–2008, but with the addition of a twelfth 'international' jury, and with televoting points factored up accordingly.
2010	As in 1999–2008, but with only five juries from Swedish regions; the other six from other European countries.
2011–2017	Eleven international juries give points as above; televoting now gives respective shares of 473 points (the total of all the juries) based on percentage of total vote, e.g. a song that gets 10% of the televoting would receive 47 points (47.3).
2018	As 2011–2017, but with the addition of 7's, 5's and 3's in the juries voting, to mirror the Eurovision voting system. This creates a total of 638 available televoting points.
2019–present	Public voting is sorted into eight groups: votes through the app are sorted into seven groups based on age, with an eighth group for votes cast by telephone. Each group awards points (1, 2, 4, 6, 8, 10 and 12 in heats; 0 or 1 in the second-chance duets; 1–8, 10 and 12 in the final) based on its votes. Currently, the jury consists of eight countries whose public and jury give equal number of votes (i.e. each offer 464 points, with 928 in total). Voting by SMS is discontinued. Starting from 2020, the televoting results are announced based on the juries' ranking in reverse order.

== Records ==
In the event of a tie, the song that received more votes from the public receives the higher position. The closest victories are Tommy Körberg's in 1969 and Björn Skifs' in 1978. In 1969, Körberg tied for first place with Jan Malmsjö before winning after the jury voted for their favourite out of the two. In 1978, Björn Skifs tied for first place with Lasse Holm, Kikki Danielsson and Wizex; but won after each jury was called to vote for their favourite out of the tied songs. Unlike in 1969, each jury group (rather than individual jury members) counted for one point in the tie-break.

Since the current voting system was introduced, results have been more clear-cut. The televoters and juries agreed on the winner in seven out of nine finals between 1999 and 2007. The closest victory is The Mamas with the song “Move” in 2020, beating Dotter by a single point, 137 to 136. The biggest victory by straight-points in the history of the event is ABBA's win in 1974 with 302 points. Under the current voting system the record is 181 points, achieved by John Lundvik in 2019 with the song "Too Late for Love". The winner with the biggest difference of points to the second placed song is Måns Zelmerlöw in 2015 with the song "Heroes", who beat Jon Henrik Fjällgren's "Jag är fri (Manne leam frijje)" by 149 points in 2015. "Heroes" also garnered the largest number of both jury and viewer points received by an entry since 1999, gathering 122 points and 166 points, respectively. Two songs have scored top marks from each voting region: Carola Häggkvist in 1983 with "Främling", and Arvingarna in 1993 with "Eloise", however, in 1993, experimental televoting was used and the two are not entirely comparable. The biggest victory in terms of points as a percentage of the total possible score is also held by Carola and "Främling", which defeated Kikki Danielsson's "Varför är kärleken röd?" by 43 points, 48% of the total potential mark.

== Jury regions ==
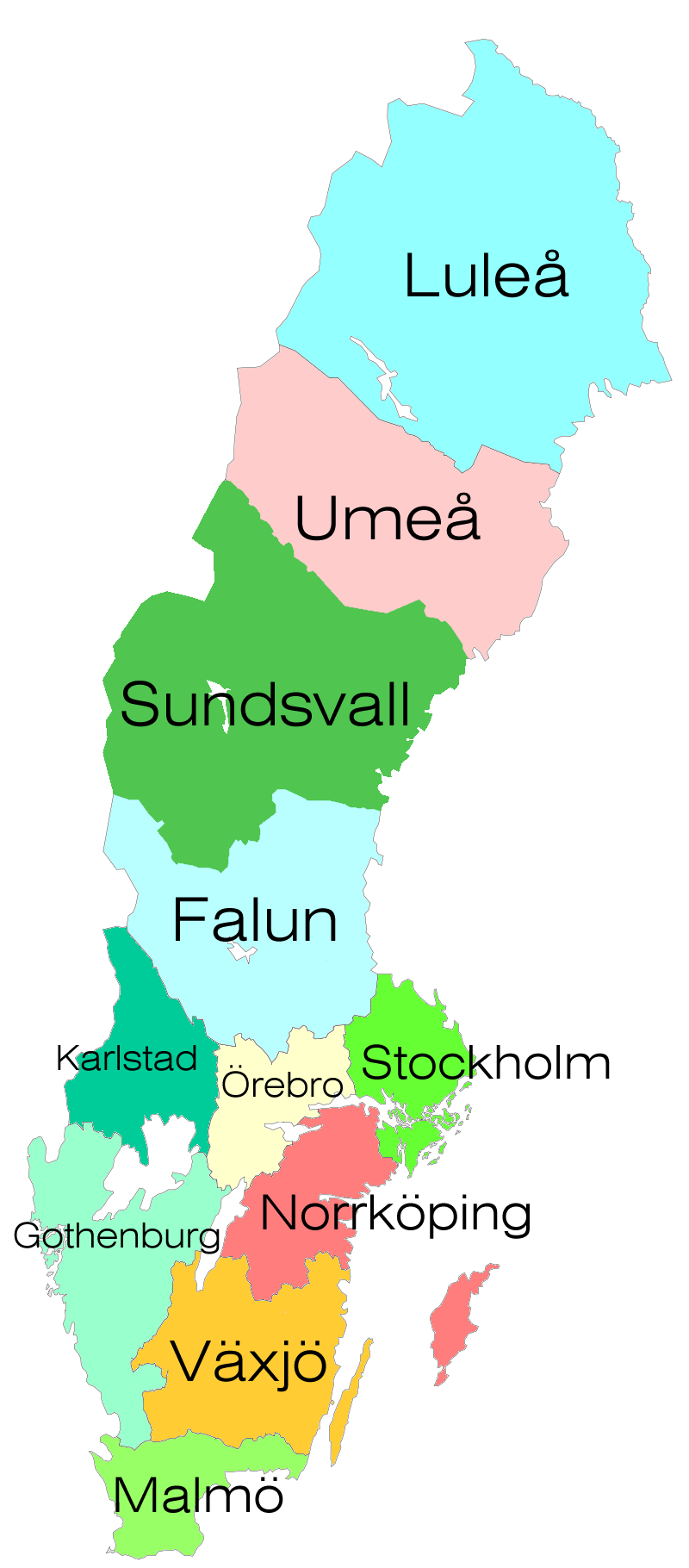
SVT has eleven news districts, each of which was represented by a jury in the final of Melodifestivalen from 1974 to 2009.

Until 2010, each jury represented one of SVT's news districts. In 2010, six juries were replaced by international juries from different European countries, with the remaining juries coming from Luleå, Umeå, Gothenburg, Malmö and Stockholm. In 2011, the regional juries were all replaced by international juries. In 2013 and 2014, all countries of the "Big Five" in Eurovision cast their votes.

=== Swedish juries ===
Running order from 1965
Running order	District
01	Örebro
02	Luleå
03	Falun
04	Karlstad
05	Umeå
06	Norrköping
07	Gothenburg
08	Sundsvall
09	Växjö
10	Malmö
11	Stockholm

=== International juries ===
Year	Juries
2009	International jury
2010	France, Greece, Ireland, Norway, Russia, Serbia
2011	Croatia, France, Germany, Greece, Ireland, Malta, Norway, Russia, San Marino, Ukraine, United Kingdom
2012	Belgium, Bosnia and Herzegovina, Cyprus, Estonia, France, Germany, Ireland, Malta, Norway, Ukraine, United Kingdom
2013	Croatia, Cyprus, France, Germany, Iceland, Israel, Italy, Malta, Spain, Ukraine, United Kingdom
2014	Denmark, Estonia, France, Germany, Israel, Italy, Malta, Netherlands, Russia, Spain, United Kingdom
2015	Armenia, Austria, Belgium, Cyprus, Estonia, France, Israel, Malta, Netherlands, Slovenia, United Kingdom
2016	Australia, Belarus, Bosnia & Herzegovina, Cyprus, Estonia, France, Israel, Italy, Netherlands, Norway, Slovenia
2017	Armenia, Australia, Czech Republic, France, Israel, Italy, Malta, Norway, Poland, Ukraine, United Kingdom
2018	Albania, Armenia, Australia, Cyprus, France, Georgia, Iceland, Italy, Poland, Portugal, United Kingdom
2019	Australia, Austria, Cyprus, Finland, France, Israel, Portugal, United Kingdom
2020	Armenia, Australia, Austria, France, Iceland, Israel, Malta, Netherlands
2021	Albania, Cyprus, France, Iceland, Israel, Netherlands, Switzerland, United Kingdom
2022	Australia, Czech Republic, Finland, Ireland, Israel, Italy, Netherlands, Spain
2023	Australia, Austria, Belgium, Croatia, Germany, Latvia, Malta, Spain
2024	Australia, Belgium, Cyprus, Germany, Iceland, Ireland, Malta, Serbia
2025	France, Greece, Ireland, Italy, Lithuania, Norway, Serbia, Switzerland
2026	Armenia, Australia, Croatia, Czechia, Finland, France, Greece, Italy
