= List of Melodifestivalen winners =

This article lists the songs and artists that have won Melodifestivalen, the Swedish national selection for the Eurovision Song Contest. There was no competition in 1964, 1970, and 1976. Due to the COVID-19 pandemic in Europe, 2020 marked the first year that the winning song of Melodifestivalen ("Move" performed by The Mamas) was unable to compete in that year's Eurovision Song Contest.

== List of winners ==
Table key
#	Winner
†	Second place
‡	Third place
◁	Last place
X	Did not compete at the Eurovision Song Contest

Year	Final date	Song	Artist	Songwriter(s)	Result in Eurovision
1959	29 January	"Augustin"	Siw Malmkvist	Åke Gerhard, Harry Sandin	9th (performed by Brita Borg) (Note: The Swedish Eurovision singers in 1959, 1960 and 1961 were chosen internally by Sveriges Radio, the songs were performed by different singers at Melodifestivalen.)
1960	2 February	"Alla andra får varann"	Östen Warnerbring/Inger Berggren	Åke Gerhard, Ulf Kjellqvist	10th (performed by Siw Malmkvist)
1961	6 February	"April, april"	Siw Malmkvist/Gunnar Wiklund	Bobbie Ericson, Bo Eneby	14th (performed by Lill-Babs)
1962	13 February	"Sol och vår"	Inger Berggren/Lily Berglund	Åke Gerhard, Ulf Kjellqvist	7th
1963	16 February	"En gång i Stockholm"	Monica Zetterlund/Carli Tornehave	Bobbie Ericson, Beppe Wolgers	13th
1965	13 February	"Annorstädes vals"	Ingvar Wixell	Dag Wirén, Alf Henrikson	10th (as "Absent Friends")
1966	29 January	"Nygammal vals"	Lill Lindfors & Svante Thuresson	Bengt Arne Wallin, Björn Lindroth	2nd
1967	24 February	"Som en dröm"	Östen Warnerbring	Curt Petterson, Marcus Österdahl, Patrice Hellberg	8th
1968	9 March	"Det börjar verka kärlek, banne mig"	Claes-Göran Hederström	Peter Himmelstrand	5th
1969	1 March	"Judy, min vän"	Tommy Körberg	Roger Wallis, Britt Lindeborg	9th
1971	27 February	"Vita vidder"	Family Four	Håkan Elmquist	6th
1972	12 February	"Härliga sommardag"	Family Four	Håkan Elmquist	13th
1973	10 February	"Sommaren som aldrig säger nej"	Malta (Note: The band's name was changed to "Nova" for Eurovision in order to avoid confusion between the band and the country of the same name.)	Monica Dominique, Carl-Axel Dominique, Lars Forssell	5th (as "You're Summer")
1974	9 February	"Waterloo"	ABBA	Benny Andersson, Björn Ulvaeus, Stikkan Andersson	1st
1975	15 February	"Jennie, Jennie"	Lasse Berghagen	Lasse Berghagen	8th
1977	26 February	"Beatles"	Forbes	Claes Bure, Sven-Olof Bagge	18th
1978	11 February	"Det blir alltid värre framåt natten"	Björn Skifs	Peter Himmelstrand	14th
1979	17 February	"Satellit"	Ted Gärdestad	Ted Gärdestad, Kenneth Gärdestad	17th
1980	8 March	"Just nu!"	Tomas Ledin	Tomas Ledin	10th
1981	21 February	"Fångad i en dröm"	Björn Skifs	Björn Skifs, Bengt Palmers	10th
1982	27 February	"Dag efter dag"	Chips	Lasse Holm, Monica Forsberg	8th
1983	26 February	"Främling"	Carola Häggkvist	Monica Forsberg, Lasse Holm	3rd
1984	25 February	"Diggi-Loo Diggi-Ley"	Herreys	Britt Lindeborg, Torgny Söderberg	1st
1985	2 March	"Bra vibrationer"	Kikki Danielsson	Ingela Forsman, Lasse Holm	3rd
1986	22 March	"E' de' det här du kallar kärlek?"	Lasse Holm & Monica Törnell	Lasse Holm	5th
1987	21 February	"Fyra bugg och en Coca Cola"	Lotta Engberg	Mikael Wendt, Christer Lundh	12th (as "Boogaloo") (Note: The song's title was changed to "Boogaloo" for Eurovision to avoid using a brand name.)
1988	27 February	"Stad i ljus"	Tommy Körberg	Py Bäckman	12th
1989	11 March	"En dag"	Tommy Nilsson	Tim Norell, Ola Håkansson, Alexander Bard	4th
1990	9 March	"Som en vind"	Edin-Ådahl	Mikael Wendt	16th
1991	31 March	"Fångad av en stormvind"	Carola Häggkvist	Stephan Berg	1st
1992	14 March	"I morgon är en annan dag"	Christer Björkman	Niklas Strömstedt	22nd
1993	5 March	"Eloise"	Arvingarna	Lasse Holm, Gert Lengstrand	7th
1994	12 March	"Stjärnorna"	Roger Pontare & Marie Bergman	Peter Bertilsson, Mikael Littwold	13th
1995	24 February	"Se på mig"	Jan Johansen	Ingela Forsman, Bobby Ljunggren, Håkan Almqvist	3rd
1996	24 February	"Den vilda"	One More Time	Nanne Grönvall, Peter Grönvall	3rd
1997	8 March	"Bara hon älskar mig"	Blond	Stephan Berg	14th
1998	14 March	"Kärleken är"	Jill Johnson	Ingela Forsman, Bobby Ljunggren, Håkan Almqvist	10th
1999	27 February	"Tusen och en natt"	Charlotte Nilsson	Gert Lengstrand, Lars Diedricsson	1st (as "Take Me to Your Heaven")
2000	10 March	"När vindarna viskar mitt namn"	Roger Pontare	Thomas Holmstrand, Linda Jansson, Peter Dahl	7th (as "When Spirits Are Calling My Name")
2001	23 February	"Lyssna till ditt hjärta"	Friends	Thomas G:son, Henrik Sethsson	5th (as "Listen to Your Heartbeat")
2002	1 March	"Never Let It Go"	Afro-Dite	Marcos Ubeda	8th
2003	15 March	"Give Me Your Love"	Fame	Calle Kindbom, Carl Lösnitz	5th
2004	20 March	"Det gör ont"	Lena Philipsson	Thomas Eriksson	5th (as "It Hurts")
2005	12 March	"Las Vegas"	Martin Stenmarck	Niklas Edberger, Johan Fransson, Tim Larsson, Tobias Lundgren	19th
2006	18 March	"Evighet"	Carola	Carola, Bobby Ljunggren, Thomas G:son, Henrik Wikström	5th (as "Invincible")
2007	10 March	"The Worrying Kind"	The Ark	Ola Salo	18th
2008	15 March	"Hero"	Charlotte Perrelli	Bobby Ljunggren, Fredrik Kempe	18th
2009	14 March	"La Voix"	Malena Ernman	Fredrik Kempe, Malena Ernman	21st
2010	13 March	"This Is My Life"	Anna Bergendahl	Bobby Ljunggren, Kristian Lagerström	SF 11
2011	12 March	"Popular"	Eric Saade	Fredrik Kempe	3rd
2012	10 March	"Euphoria"	Loreen	Thomas G:son, Peter Boström	1st
2013	9 March	"You"	Robin Stjernberg	Robin Stjernberg, Linnea Deb, Joy Deb, Joakim Harestad Haukaas	14th
2014	8 March	"Undo"	Sanna Nielsen	Fredrik Kempe, David Kreuger, Hamed "K-One" Pirouzpanah	3rd
2015	14 March	"Heroes"	Måns Zelmerlöw	Anton Malmberg Hård af Segerstad, Joy Deb, Linnea Deb	1st
2016	12 March	"If I Were Sorry"	Frans	Oscar Fogelström, Michael Saxell, Fredrik Andersson, Frans Jeppsson-Wall	5th
2017	11 March	"I Can't Go On"	Robin Bengtsson	David Kreuger, Hamed "K-One" Pirouzpanah, Robin Stjernberg	5th
2018	10 March	"Dance You Off"	Benjamin Ingrosso	Benjamin Ingrosso, MAG, Louis Schoorl, K Nita	7th
2019	9 March	"Too Late For Love"	John Lundvik	John Lundvik, Anderz Wrethov, Andreas Stone Johansson	5th
2020	7 March	"Move"	The Mamas	Melanie Wehbe, Patrik Jean, Herman Gardarfve	Contest cancelled due to COVID-19 pandemic
2021	13 March	"Voices"	Tusse	Anderz Wrethov, Jimmy Thörnfeldt, Joy Deb, Linnea Deb	14th
2022	12 March	"Hold Me Closer"	Cornelia Jakobs	Isa Molin, David Zandén, Cornelia Jakobsdotter	4th
2023	11 March	"Tattoo"	Loreen	Jimmy Thörnfeldt, Jimmy Jansson, Lorine Talhaoui, Moa Carlebecker, Peter Boström, Thomas G:son	1st
2024	9 March	"Unforgettable"	Marcus & Martinus	Jimmy Thörnfeldt, Linnea Deb, Joy Deb, Marcus Gunnarsen, Martinus Gunnarsen	9th
2025	8 March	"Bara bada bastu"	KAJ	Anderz Wrethov, Axel Åhman, Jakob Norrgård, Kevin Holmström, Kristofer Strandberg, Robert Skowronski	4th
2026	7 March	"My System"	Felicia	Audun Agnar Guldbrandsen, Emily Harbakk, Felicia Eriksson, Julie Bergan, Theresa Rex	20th
