= My Turn =

My Turn may refer to:

== Books ==
- My Turn (memoir), a 1989 autobiography by Nancy Reagan
- My Turn: Hillary Clinton Targets the Presidency, a 2015 biography by Doug Henwood

== Television ==
- "My Turn!", an episode of the TV series Pocoyo

== Music ==
=== Albums ===
- My Turn (Doug Stone album), 2007
- My Turn (Lil Baby album), 2020
- My Turn (Tanya Tucker album), 2009
- My Turn (EP) or the title song (see below), by John Lundvik, 2019

=== Songs ===
- "My Turn" (Hoobastank song), 2009
- "My Turn" (John Lundvik song), 2018
- "My Turn" (Martina Bárta song), 2017
- "My Turn", by Basement Jaxx from Scars, 2009
- "My Turn", by Luke and Q, 2006
