= Alla tiders Melodifestival =

2005 Melodifestivalen-related gala in Stockholm, Sweden

Date and venue
- Final: 21 March 2005
- Venue: Cirkus, Stockholm, Sweden

Organisation
- Host broadcaster: SVT
- Presenters: Kattis Ahlström; Christer Björkman

Participants
- Number of entries: 10 from one country

Vote
- Voting system: Online public vote
- Winning song: "Waterloo" by ABBA

Alla tiders Melodifestival (English: All-time Melodifestival) was a gala show organised by Swedish broadcaster Sveriges Television (SVT) to celebrate 50 years of the Eurovision Song Contest and the Swedish selection for it, Melodifestivalen. It was filmed at Cirkus in Stockholm on 21 March 2005 and broadcast on SVT1 on 8 April of the same year. The ten songs performed were chosen by an online public vote to raise money for Världens Barn, an initiative by Radiohjälpen to strengthen children's rights.

== Songs ==
Place	Song	Year, result	Artist	Performer at gala
1st	"Waterloo"	1974, 1st	ABBA	Carola Häggkvist and Marit Bergman
2nd	"Främling"	1983, 1st	Carola Häggkvist	Sophie Rimheden and Håkan Lidbo
3rd	"Diggi-Loo Diggi-Ley"	1984, 1st	Herreys	Viktoria Tolstoy
4th	"När vindarna viskar mitt namn"	2000, 1st	Roger Pontare	Roger Pontare and HammerFall
5th	"Det gör ont"	2004, 1st	Lena Philipsson	Darin
6th	"Stad i ljus"	1988, 1st	Tommy Körberg	Cyndee Peters
7th	"Michelangelo"	1975, 5th	Björn Skifs	Wilmer X
8th	"Tusen och en natt"	1999, 1st	Charlotte Perrelli	Rikard Wolff
9th	"Fångad av en stormvind"	1991, 1st	Carola Häggkvist	Mendez
10th	"Symfonin"	1990, 10th	Loa Falkman	Lizette Pålsson, Annika Ljungberg and Sara Nordensson

== See also ==
- Congratulations: 50 Years of the Eurovision Song Contest
