= Melodifestivalen =

Swedish Eurovision Song Contest preselection

- Logo since 2016
- Also known as: Mello; Melfest
- Genre: Song contest
- Presented by: List of presenters
- Country of origin: Sweden
- Original language: Swedish
- No. of seasons: 65

Production
- Production location: Multiple cities in Sweden
- Running time: 1 hour 30 minutes (heats); 2 hours (final)
- Production company: Sveriges Television

Original release
- Release: 29 January 1959 – present

Related
- Lilla Melodifestivalen; Eurovision Song Contest

Melodifestivalen (Swedish pronunciation: [mɛlʊˈdîːfɛstɪˌvɑːlɛn]; lit. 'the Melody Festival'), also known locally as Mello and internationally as Melfest, is an annual song competition organised by Swedish public broadcasters Sveriges Television (SVT) and Sveriges Radio (SR). It determines the country's representative for the Eurovision Song Contest, and has been staged almost every year since 1959. The selection of the country's Eurovision entry is its primary focus, in contrast to some others such as Italy's Sanremo Music Festival. In the early 2000s, the competition was the most popular television program in Sweden; it is also broadcast on radio and the Internet. In 2012, the heats averaged 3.3 million viewers, and over an estimated four million people in Sweden watched the final, almost half of the Swedish population.

The festival has produced seven Eurovision winners and 26 top-five placings for Sweden in the contest. The winner of Melodifestivalen has been chosen by panels of jurors since its inception. Since 1999, the juries have been joined by a public telephone vote which has an equal influence over the outcome. The competition makes a considerable impact on the music charts in Sweden.

The introduction of heats in 2002 raised the potential number of contestants from around twelve to thirty-two. A children's version of the competition, Lilla Melodifestivalen, also began that year. Light orchestrated pop songs, known locally as schlager music, used to be so prevalent that the festival was sometimes referred to as schlagerfestivalen ("the schlager festival") or schlager-sm ("schlager Swedish championship") by the Swedish media. However, other styles of music, such as rap, reggae, and glam rock, have made an appearance since the event's expansion. The introduction of a final in Stockholm has attracted substantial tourism to the city.

== Origins ==
With seven nations competing, the first Eurovision Song Contest took place in Lugano, Switzerland in May 1956. Sweden debuted in the third edition of the song competition in 1958. Without broadcasting a public selection, Sveriges Radio (SR) (Note: Sveriges Radio controlled Swedish public service television and radio until 1 July 1979, when SVT was created.) chose to send Alice Babs to the contest in Hilversum, Netherlands. The song selected was "Samma stjärna lyser för oss två" (lit. 'The same stars shine for the two of us'), later renamed "Lilla stjärna" (lit. 'Little star'). It finished fourth at Eurovision on 12 March 1958.

The first Melodifestivalen, incorporated into the Säg det med musik radio series, took place on 29 January 1959 at Cirkus in Stockholm; eight songs participated. Four "expert" juries in Stockholm, Gothenburg, Malmö, and Luleå decided the winner. The competition was won by Siw Malmkvist performing "Augustin", but SR decided that the winning song—regardless of its original performer—would be performed by Brita Borg at Eurovision. This policy of selecting the artist for Eurovision internally and having other artists perform potential Swedish entries at Melodifestivalen was stopped in 1961. The competition became a standalone television programme in 1960, known as the Eurovisionschlagern, svensk final. In the event's early years, it was also broadcast in Norway and Denmark via the Nordvision network. The competition adopted its current name, Melodifestivalen, in 1967.

Melodifestivalen has failed to be staged on three occasions. In 1964, the competition was cancelled due to an artist's strike; Sweden did not send a song to Eurovision that year. Sweden was absent at Eurovision for a second time in 1970 because of a Nordic boycott of the voting system, which had led to a four-way tie for first place at the 1969 contest. After SR staged the 1975 contest in Stockholm, left-wing groups argued that Sweden should not spend money to win and host Eurovision again. This led to mass demonstrations against commercial music and the organisation of an anti-commercial Alternativfestivalen. Therefore, Sweden decided not to send a song to Eurovision 1976 but returned in 1977.

== Participation ==
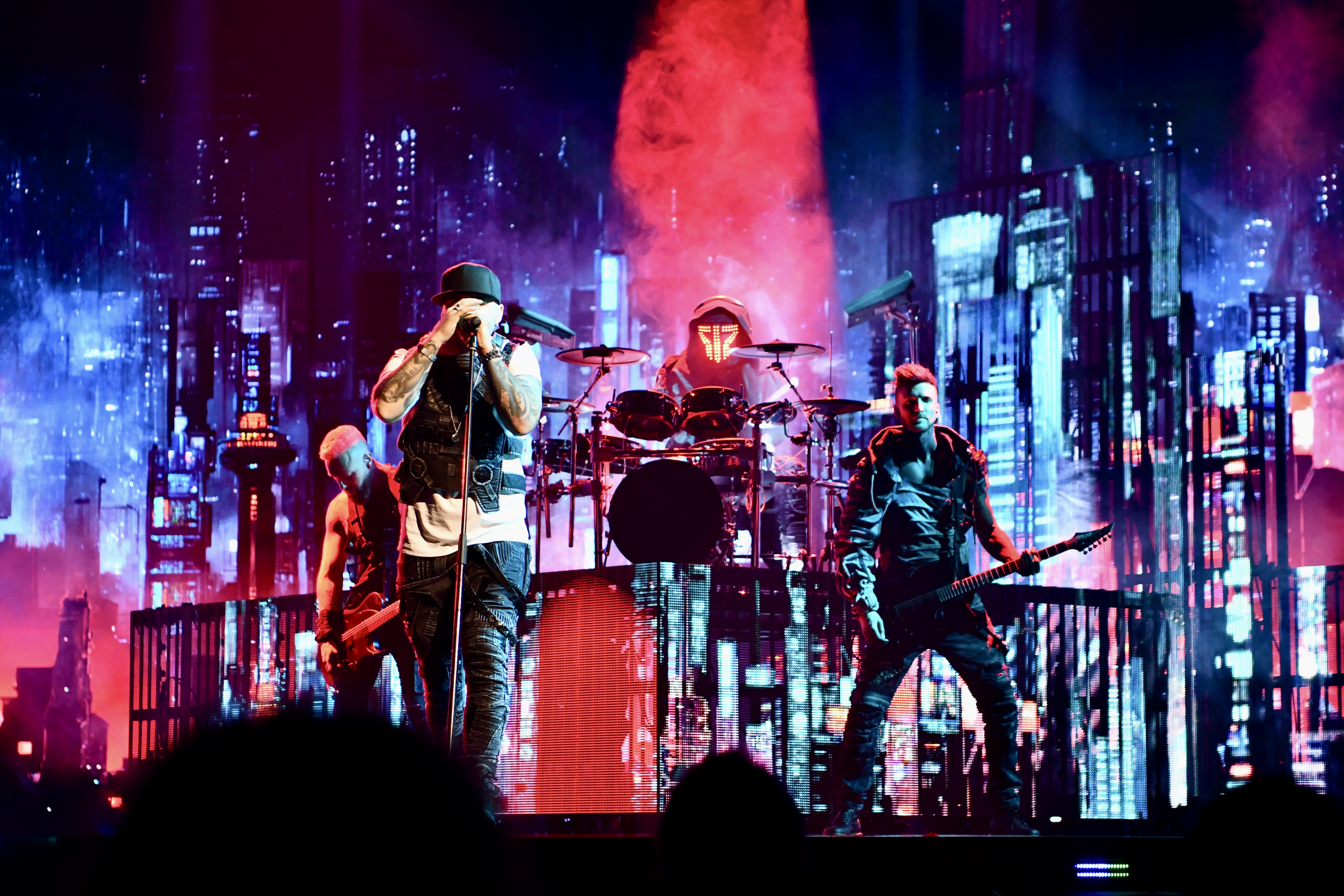
Smash into Pieces performing at the fourth heat of Melodifestivalen 2023

Hundreds of songs and performers have entered Melodifestivalen since its debut. Although songwriters living outside Sweden were once not allowed to enter Melodifestivalen, the 2012 contest marked the first time foreign songwriters could submit entries, provided that they collaborated with a Swedish songwriter. To be eligible, songwriters and performers must be at least sixteen years of age on the day of the first Eurovision semi-final.

Until 2001, participation in the festival was limited to a single night. The number of contestants ranged from five to twelve. A two-round system was used intermittently between 1981 and 1998, in which all but five of the contestants were eliminated in the first round of voting. Failure to reach the second round under this system was seen as a major failure for a prominent artist; when Elisabeth Andreassen failed to qualify in 1984, it almost ended her music career. The introduction of weekly heats in 2002 increased the number of contestants to thirty-two. At least ten of the contestants must perform in Swedish. A CD of each year's competing songs has been released since 2001, and a DVD of the heats and final since 2003. Due to the proliferation of digital download and streaming into the 2010s, DVDs have not been issued for Melodifestivalen in recent years.

Melodifestivalen has been the launch-pad for the success of popular local acts, such as ABBA, Tommy Körberg, and Lisa Nilsson. The competition has played host to performers from outside Sweden, including Baccara, Alannah Myles, Katrina Leskanich, Cornelis Vreeswijk, and Margaret. Melodifestivalen participants have also represented—and unsuccessfully tried to represent—other countries at Eurovision. While local success for Melodifestivalen winners is common, most contestants return to obscurity and few have major international success. The impact that the competition makes on the Swedish charts means an artist need not win the competition to earn significant domestic record sales. For example, the song which finished last at Melodifestivalen 1990, "Symfonin" by Loa Falkman, topped Sverigetopplistan, the Swedish singles chart. The most recent occurrence was 2024 with Fröken Snusk's song "Unga & fria". In 2007, twenty-one participants reached the Sverigetopplistan. The week after the 2008 final, songs from the festival made up the entire top fifteen on the domestic singles chart.

== Selection of contestants ==
The process of narrowing thousands of potential entries down to the competing songs lasts over seven months. SVT directly selects half of the entries from amongst public submissions, while the other half comes from special invitations made by SVT or other entries that SVT has selected from amongst the submissions. Between 2012 and 2021, the final entry was selected via the P4 Nästa competition organised by Sveriges Radio P4. At least 10% of the competing songs are sung in Swedish. The entire process can begin as early as May of the previous year and is completed by January.

=== Songs ===
SVT begins looking for songs nine months before the start of the televised Melodifestivalen (within days of the previous year's Eurovision final). The deadline for submission is in September and songs can be in any language. In the pre-selection, song length is limited to three minutes and twenty seconds; songs must be shortened to three minutes if they reach the final twenty-eight and qualifying songs may also be remixed.

The submission process is overseen by members of the Swedish Music Publishers Association (SMFF), whose task is to reduce the number of songs, which have numbered over 3,000 a year since 2002, to around 1,200. The 3,440 entries received in the preselection for Melodifestivalen 2009 was the most in the competition's history. The figure has since lowered to around 2,500 submissions every year. The SMFF's choices are then given to a sixteen-person jury of music professionals, SVT staff and other members of the public. The jury ranges from teenagers to people in their fifties. The songs that qualify, along with their composers and lyricists, are announced at the end of September. This is often followed by fervent speculation over who will perform the songs. Songwriters that qualify must provide interviews to SVT, attend a press conference before the competition, and remain open to promotional appearances if their song reaches the final.

=== Artists and wildcards ===
SVT selects performers for the entries. Artists who perform the demo of a song automatically enter the competition; they must perform their songs if suitable alternate performers cannot be found. The artists' songs risk disqualification if they refuse. In the past, this rule led to the disqualification of, among others, Carola's "När löven faller" in 2003 and Stephen Simmonds' "So Good" in 2006. SVT may also give songs to other performers without considering the interests of the demo artist. This prevented the Brandsta City Släckers (in 2004) and Pernilla Wahlgren (in 2005) from performing the songs they had submitted. Replacements for disqualified songs fare unpredictably at the competition. In 2006, "Naughty Boy" by Hannah Graaf (the replacement for Simmonds' song) finished second to last in its heat. In 2002 and 2007, by contrast, the replacements performed by Jan Johansen and Måns Zelmerlöw reached the final ten. The contestants that will perform the twenty-eight qualifiers from the preselection are announced in late November. Singer-songwriters are common. As such, artists often confirm that they will participate before the official announcement.

The wildcard (joker) system was introduced in 2004 to diversify the music featured. Four artists, one in each heat, were invited by SVT to enter a song of their choice into the competition, provided it does not breach the rules. The wildcard songs and artists were announced in January. Since the wildcards' introduction, three have won the competition. The wildcard system was discontinued in 2013.

== Hosting ==
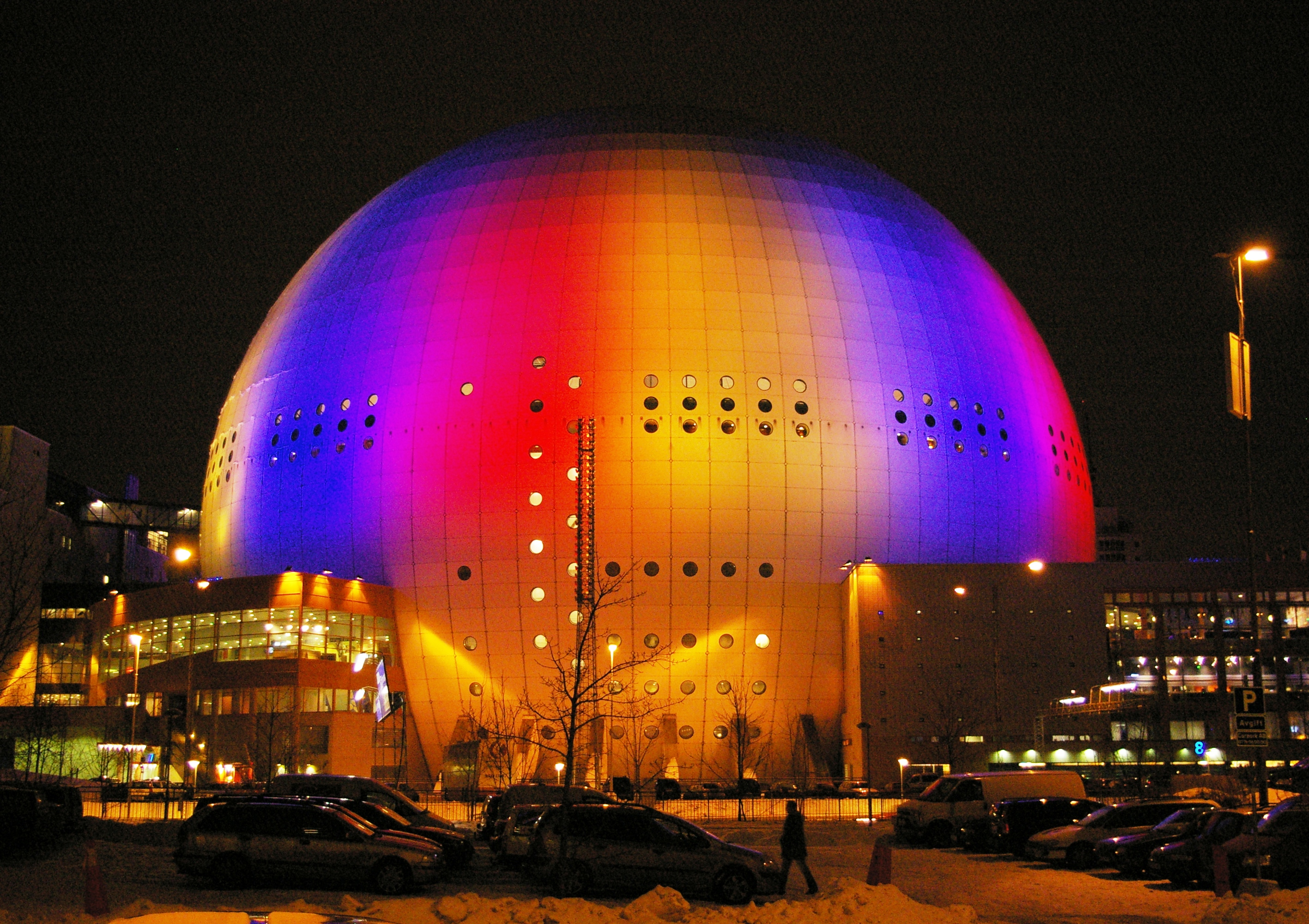
Avicii Arena hosted the first of its 12 Melodifestivalen finals in 1989.

The venues for each year's Melodifestivalen are announced in September of the preceding year. The heats are held in towns and cities throughout Sweden. The 16,300-capacity Globe Arena (now Avicii Arena) in Stockholm hosted the final since the heats were introduced in 2002, through to 2012. In 2013, the final was moved to the newly built Friends Arena in Solna Municipality, Stockholm County. The Scandinavium in Gothenburg was offered to host the 2005 final, but ultimately declined due to a scheduling conflict with a Frölunda HC ice hockey match.

The event spent its early years at one venue: Cirkus in Stockholm, which hosted the first ten competitions. It has hosted the Melodifestivalen final 17 times in total. The Avicii Arena has hosted seven finals, and SVT's Stockholm headquarters has staged five. The competition first took place outside Stockholm in 1975 as part of a decentralisation policy at SR. Stockholm has hosted 37 finals in total, including the first 14. Gothenburg has hosted eight, and Malmö seven. The competition's final has never been held outside these cities. Before the 2002 expansion, the host of the previous year's Melodifestivalen would host the Eurovision Song Contest in the event of a Swedish victory. As such, Eurovision 1985, Eurovision 1992 and Eurovision 2000 were held in Gothenburg, Malmö and Stockholm, respectively. Since 2002, the only venues that have hosted more than three heats are Gothenburg's Scandinavium, which has hosted one every year since 2003, and Malmö's Malmö Arena. In 2008, the Second Chance round was held in Kiruna, which lies north of the Arctic Circle. Since 2013, the final has been held at the Friends Arena. In 2021, all shows of that year's Melodifestivalen took place in the Annexet in Stockholm, and without an audience present, due to the COVID-19 pandemic. The pandemic continued to affect the organisation of Melodifestivalen in 2022, with the first three heats of that year's competition all held at the Avicii Arena, and the remaining shows at the Friends Arena.

== Televised rounds ==
Melodifestivalen takes place over six Saturdays and consists of six live shows: five heats, in each of which six songs compete (with a final qualification (finalkvalet) run-off vote after the fifth heat); and a final. The final lineup consists of twelve songs - ten direct qualifiers from heats (two per heat) and two best-ranked songs in the final qualification run-off vote.

Before the introduction of the new format in 2024, four heats took place, with seven songs participating in each heat, two songs qualifying to the final directly and two songs qualifying for the Second Chance round (Andra Chansen), with the four best-ranked songs in that round advancing to the final (two before 2015).

=== Heats and Second Chance ===
Prior to the introduction of the current format of heats (deltävlingar) in 2002, the competition was usually a single live show. Under the current system, five heats are broadcast at 20:00 CET on consecutive Saturday nights. The heats begin in early February, and six songs compete in each show.

Unlike in the final, no juries are used; televoting decides the results. The songs are performed live with telephone lines open for the first round of voting; two songs with the fewest votes do not qualify to the second round. The top five battle for a place in the final and Second Chance round – with the first and second-placed songs directly qualifying for the final (known in Swedish as direkt till finalen), and the third and fourth-placed songs progressing to the Second Chance round. Both finalists reprise their entries at the end of the broadcast. The organisation of a heat system for Melodifestivalen popularised televised heats at other Eurovision national selections. A similar system was adopted by the Eurovision Song Contest itself in 2004, which features a semi-final (later expanded to two in 2008) and a final, and remains in place to the present day.

The Second Chance round (Andra chansen) was the fifth heat in which the remaining four entries to the final are chosen. The third- and fourth-placed songs from each heat (eight songs in total) competed in the event. The first Second Chance round (then known as the Winners’ Choice or Vinnarnas val) in 2002 had a panel of former winners decide the two finalists. Between 2003 and 2006, the heat performances were re-broadcast, and a round of voting narrowed the songs to three or four. Another round then determined the two finalists. The programme was broadcast on the Sunday afternoon after the fourth heat. It was held in a smaller venue than those that would have hosted the heats—such as Berns Salonger in Stockholm, which hosted the Second Chance round in 2005.

In 2007, the Second Chance round became a full heat, taking place in a venue comparable in size to those hosting the others. The expanded Second Chance took place on a Saturday night, adding an extra week to the event's timetable. The format of voting also changed with the introduction of a knock-out system. The original format paired the eight songs off against each other in duels, narrowing them down to four before pairing them off again. The winners of the second knock-out then went through to the final. The two finalists did not reprise their songs at the end of the programme.

In 2015, the system was changed again. The second knock-out round was scrapped, meaning that the winners of initial duels qualified to the final instead of advancing to the second knock-out, and the number of finalists increased to 12.

In 2022, several changes were made to the overall format. The Second Chance round was reformatted into a semi-final (semifinal), where the eight songs are placed into two groups, with the top two from each group proceeding to the final. In 2023, the format of the semi-final was changed again, with the top four of the eight songs all proceeding to the final, similar to the preceding heats.

In 2024, the semi-final was scrapped as a separate heat. Instead, the third and fourth-placed songs from each heat were placed into a final qualification (finalkvalet) run-off vote round at the end of the newly-added fifth heat, with the top two songs proceeding to the final.

The Second Chance round will be dropped in 2027.

=== Final ===
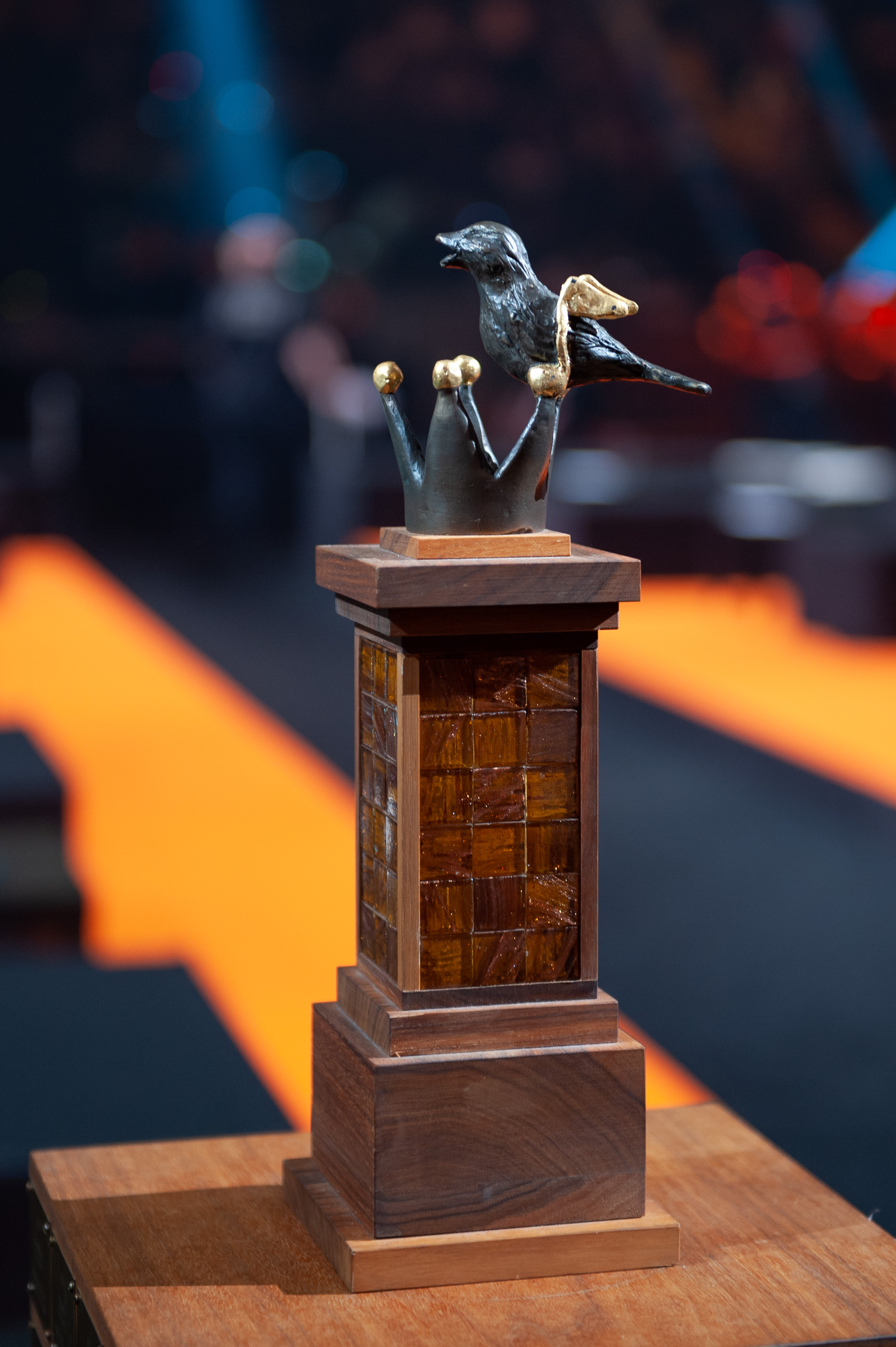
The Sångfågeln (transl. Songbird) trophy.

The final takes place at 20:00 CET on a Saturday in early or mid-March. Twelve songs (eleven songs in 2009, ten songs before 2015) participate, two from each heat, four from the Second Chance round, and, only in 2009, the international jury's choice. A running order is decided by the competition's supervisors the week before to ensure that similar songs and artists are kept apart in the final. Dress rehearsals for the final are held on the prior Friday, and tickets sell out almost as quickly as those for the final itself. The final attracts substantial tourism to its host city Stockholm; a survey in 2006 showed that 54% of spectators had travelled from outside the city. Of these, 6% had come from outside Sweden.

As in the Eurovision Song Contest (and due to the final usually also being broadcast in other Nordic countries via the Eurovision network), a broadcast of the EBU logo introduces and closes the television coverage, accompanied by the prelude to Marc-Antoine Charpentier's setting of "Te Deum". Video "postcards" introduce the entries. The final includes interval performances, which are performed while the juries deliberate and before the televote closes. Former Melodifestivalen contestants have performed as interval acts in the past, including Lena Philipsson in 2005 and the multi-artist medley of former entries in 2000.

The winner receives a trophy, Den stora Sångfågeln (transl. The Great Songbird), from the previous year's winner. The trophy, designed by Ernst Billgren, was unveiled in 2005 and awarded to all previous Melodifestivalen winners at the Alla tiders Melodifestival gala in March of that year. The winner of the competition reprises their song at the end of the event.

== Voting ==
Ulf Elfving announcing the votes of the Stockholm jury at the 2005 final. The points scored by each entry are shown on a graphic scoreboard.

Before the introduction of the current voting system in 1999, a group of regional or age-based juries decided the winner of Melodifestivalen. In 1993, televoting was used experimentally but proved unsuccessful. The Swedish telephone network collapsed due to the number of calls, and claims by the Swedish tabloid press suggested the use of televoting had drastically altered the results. Evening newspapers released what they claimed to be the back-up juries' votes, which showed that the winner, Arvingarna's "Eloise", would have finished fourth had the juries' votes counted. SVT never confirmed the accuracy of these claims.

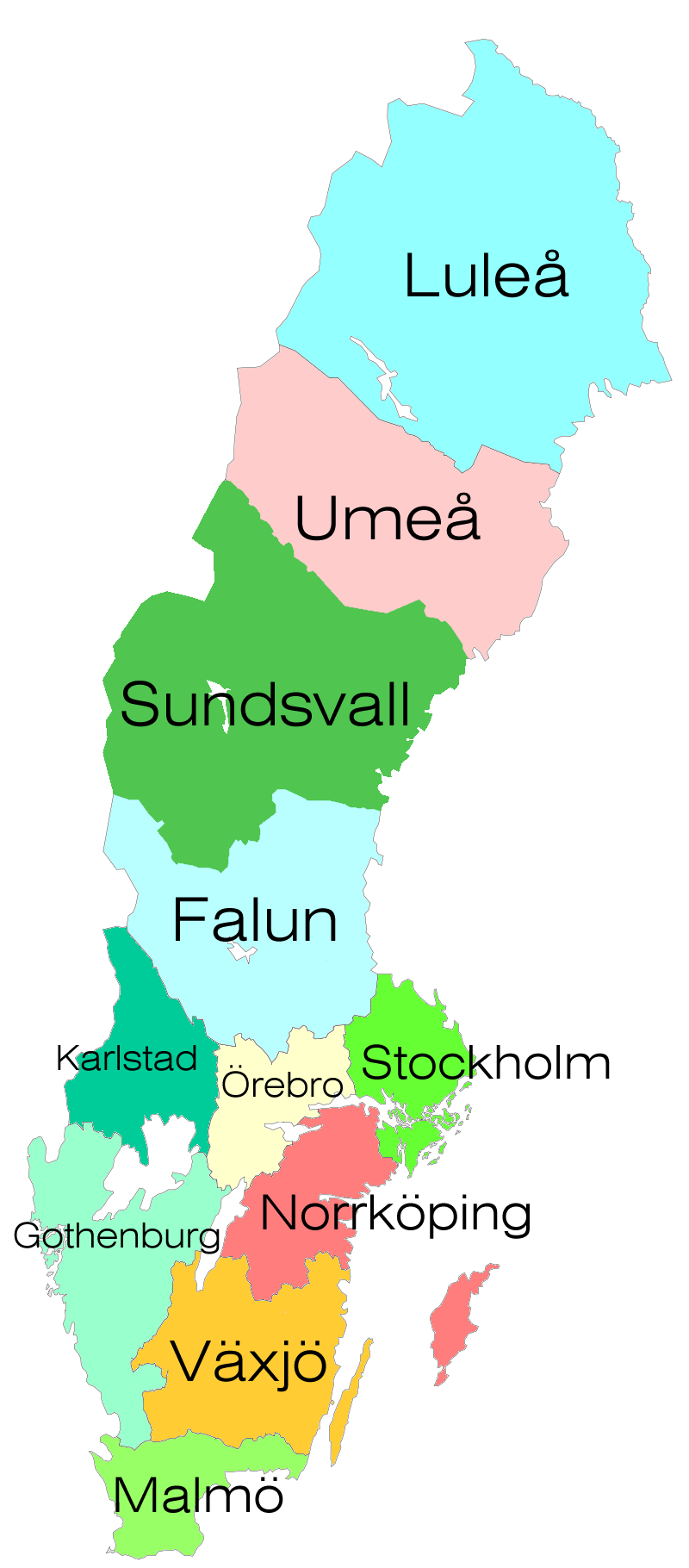
SVT has eleven regional news districts, which have been represented by a jury in the final of Melodifestivalen in past editions.

The current voting format introduced in 1999 is a positional voting system, similar to that used at the Eurovision Song Contest. The voting is made up of two segments, in the first of which juries announce their votes; in the second segment, the televoting result is announced. The total value of votes has usually been 2 x 473 points (2 x 464 since 2019), which means that tele-votes and juries have an equal 50/50 weighing in the final result. The juries, usually 11, have represented either Swedish regions or, since 2010, countries participating in the year's Eurovision Song Contest. Until 2017, each jury awarded 1, 2, 4, 6, 8, 10, and 12 points to their top seven songs; however, since 2018, the points have been changed to 1 to 7, 8, 10 and 12 points. After the jury voting, the televoting result is revealed by the hosts in ascending order. Between 1999 and 2010, the televoting points were fixed; the top seven songs would receive 11, 22, 44, 66, 88, 110 and 132 points (12, 24, 48, 72, 96, 120, and 144 points for the 2009 contest). Between 2011 and 2018, televoting points are given to each entry based on its percentage of the total vote. If an entry receives 10% of the televotes it will be equivalent to 10% of 473 points, i.e. 47–48 points (or 638 and 63–64 points respectively in 2018). Starting in 2019, the public votes are separated by age groups, each giving 1 to 7, 8, 10 and 12 points in the final to the songs and since 2020, the hosts will announce the total points from the eight age groups to the contestants in order based on the juries’ score, starting with the artist in last place from the juries and ending with the artist in first place. The song with the highest number of points at the end of the voting is the winner.

Telephone lines open immediately after the radio preview for the final and do not close until the juries have voted. Two telephone numbers are used for each song, giving voters the option of whether to donate money to SVT's Radiohjälpen charity appeal or not as they vote. Viewers can also vote by text message, and only residents of Sweden can vote. A mobile app was introduced in 2015, allowing viewers to vote for their favourites for free. Voting by text message was phased out in 2019.

The votes of the juries are announced by spokespeople who are not members of the juries. The votes are read in ascending order, beginning with one point and finishing with twelve. When read, they are repeated by the host, for example:

Spokesperson: "En poäng till melodi nummer två." (One point to song number two.)
Presenter: "En poäng till [song name]." (One point to [song name].)

Since 2010, most spokespeople have announced the points in English, with the hosts repeating them in Swedish.

As the votes are announced, they are collated on a graphic scoreboard. SVT varies the way the jury votes are announced from year to year. For example, the finalists of Expedition: Robinson acted as spokespeople in 2004, and in 2006 Fredrik Lindström announced jury tallies using the dialects of each region. The final of Melodifestivalen has broken Nordic voting records on several occasions; in 2007, voting figures exceeded two million for the first time.

If there is a tie, the song that has received more votes from the public receives the higher position. There have been two ties for first place in the history of the contest. In 1969, Tommy Körberg tied for first place with Jan Malmsjö. The juries then voted for their favourite out the two, leading to Tommy Körberg winning. In 1978, Björn Skifs tied for first place with Lasse Holm and Wizex (performing together); a similar tie-break process resulting in Skifs winning.

== Winners ==
Sixty-one of Sweden's sixty-two Eurovision representatives have come from Melodifestivalen; the 2020 winner was scheduled to participate in Eurovision before that event was cancelled due to the COVID-19 pandemic. Sweden has won the Eurovision Song Contest seven times: in 1974, 1984, 1991, 1999, 2012, 2015 and 2023. Sweden is currently tied with Ireland for the highest number of wins at Eurovision, with seven each. The 1974 Eurovision winner, ABBA's "Waterloo", was voted the most popular Melodifestivalen song of all time at the Alla tiders Melodifestival gala in March 2005. Later that year, it was voted the most popular Eurovision song of the contest's first fifty years at a gala in Copenhagen. The following table list shows those Swedish entries which finished fifth or higher at Eurovision:

Year	Song	Artist	Place at Eurovision
1966	"Nygammal vals"	Lill Lindfors and Svante Thuresson	2nd
1968	"Det börjar verka kärlek, banne mej"	Claes-Göran Hederström	5th
1973	"Sommaren som aldrig säger nej"	Malta (Note: The band changed its name to Nova for Eurovision.)	5th (Note: as "You're Summer")
1974	"Waterloo"	ABBA	1st
1983	"Främling"	Carola Häggkvist	3rd
1984	"Diggi-Loo Diggi-Ley"	Herreys	1st
1985	"Bra vibrationer"	Kikki Danielsson	3rd
1986	"E' de' det här du kallar kärlek?"	Lasse Holm and Monica Törnell	5th
1989	"En dag"	Tommy Nilsson	4th
1991	"Fångad av en stormvind"	Carola Häggkvist	1st
1995	"Se på mej"	Jan Johansen	3rd
1996	"Den vilda"	One More Time	3rd
1999	"Tusen och en natt"	Charlotte Nilsson	1st (Note: as "Take Me to Your Heaven")
2001	"Lyssna till ditt hjärta"	Friends	5th (Note: as "Listen To Your Heartbeat")
2003	"Give Me Your Love"	Fame	5th
2004	"Det gör ont"	Lena Philipsson	5th (Note: as "It Hurts")
2006	"Evighet"	Carola Häggkvist	5th (Note: as "Invincible")
2011	"Popular"	Eric Saade	3rd
2012	"Euphoria"	Loreen	1st
2014	"Undo"	Sanna Nielsen	3rd
2015	"Heroes"	Måns Zelmerlöw	1st
2016	"If I Were Sorry"	Frans	5th
2017	"I Can't Go On"	Robin Bengtsson	5th
2019	"Too Late for Love"	John Lundvik	5th
2022	"Hold Me Closer"	Cornelia Jakobs	4th
2023	"Tattoo"	Loreen	1st
2025	"Bara bada bastu"	KAJ	4th

== Rules ==
Most of Melodifestivalen's rules are dictated by those of the Eurovision Song Contest. However, regulations have been introduced by the Swedish broadcasters. The competition's official rules are released by SVT early in preparation for each year's Melodifestivalen to ensure any changes are noted by songwriters and performers.

There was a limit of six people on stage for each performance. This included the Melodifestivalen choir (huskören, literally "the house choir"), a five-person group of flexible backing singers used by most participants. Artists could use some or all of the back-up singers, or use their own group. All vocals had to be completely live; human voices were not allowed on backing tracks. However, from 2009, the number of performers allowed on stage was eight, and voices were allowed on backing tracks. A live orchestra was used every year from the event's debut to 2000, except 1985 and 1986. Two orchestras were used between 1960 and 1963, a large orchestra and Göte Wilhelmsons kvartett, a jazz quartet. Since 2001, participants have performed to backing tracks.

Entries cannot be publicly broadcast until the heats are previewed on radio. Entries eliminated in the heats may be broadcast as soon as the heat has finished. An embargo is placed on songs that qualify for the later rounds until the previews for the Second Chance are broadcast. After this, restrictions on the broadcast of contestant songs are lifted.

Broadcasters sometimes make sweeping changes to winning songs before they go to Eurovision. For example, at Melodifestivalen 1961, Siw Malmkvist won with "April, April". Performing after her victory, she stumbled on the lyrics of the song and laughed out loud. The press criticised this as childish. SR replaced her with Lill-Babs for the Eurovision Song Contest. The 1987 winner "Fyra bugg och en Coca Cola", performed by Lotta Engberg, is another example; the song's title was changed to "Boogaloo" for Eurovision, as use of a brand name was against the Contest's rules. This name was chosen as Sweden's two previous Eurovision winners had also included the suffix "-loo".

Until 1999, competing songs were only permitted in Swedish, apart from 1965, 1973, 1974, 1975. This did not stop most winning entries recording English (and other-language) versions of their songs. Since the abolition of Eurovision's language restrictions in 1999, regardless of the performance language at Melodifestivalen, every Swedish entry has been in English, bar the 2025 entry. Spanish, French, Greek, Italian, Portuguese, Bosnian and Persian are among the other languages to have featured. Cameron Cartio's entry in Melodifestivalen 2005 was performed in a constructed language.

== Media coverage ==
Melodifestivalen is broadcast on television, radio and the Internet. It is broadcast on SVT1 with international coverage on SVT World and later SVT Play. Until 1987, the competition was broadcast on Sveriges Radio TV, later known as TV1. Between 1988 and 2000, the event was broadcast on different channels depending on where it was held. Finals in Stockholm were broadcast on Kanal 1 (formerly TV1) while finals in Gothenburg or Malmö were broadcast on TV2. Sveriges Radio has broadcast the event on P1, P3 and P4, where is currently broadcast.

Although the final is traditionally held on a Saturday, in 1990 it was held on a Friday. TV2 suggested this would attract more viewers. In 1991, it was held on Easter Sunday for the same reason. The 2002 final was delayed by a week for coverage of the 2002 Winter Olympics.

The competition has had an official website since 1999. Webcasts have been provided since 2005. Since 2006, between February and the Eurovision final in May, SR has webcast a radio station dedicated to the competition called P4 Melodifest. On P4, the public previews the heats participants every Friday. Broadcast the night after the final, a dagen efter ("the day after") television programme acts as an epilogue to the event. It gauges the reactions of the finalists after the competition's climax. No commentary is given for the event on television. Carolina Norén is commentator on the event for Sveriges Radio. The festival has been broadcast in widescreen since 2002 and Dolby Digital since 2004.

The competition's viewing figures have been rising since 2002. In 2007, approximately 4.1 million Swedes—almost 44% of the country's population—watched the final, and between 2.9 million and 3.2 million viewers watched each of the heats. The viewing figures for the 2007 festival are nearly two million short of the highest recorded viewing figures from 1990. Melodifestivalen is given heavy coverage in the Swedish press. A study by the Economic Science and Communication Department at Karlstad University concluded that coverage from the press may have influenced the results of the 2007 festival.

== Musical styles and presentation ==
Lill Lindfors & Svante Thuresson "Nygammal vals (hip man svinaherde)" (1966)
The winner of Melodifestivalen 1966, typical of the jazz style popular at the competition in the 1960s. Lindfors and Thuresson sing of a meeting between a "hip pig breeder" and "a princess, a proud maiden".

Kikki Danielsson "Bra vibrationer" (1985)
Winner of the 1985 competition. This up-tempo schlager song is typical of Melodifestivalen entries in the 1980s. The song is about the "good vibrations" brought to the singer by her lover.

Melodifestivalen's image has evolved throughout its existence, but one word has defined the competition's music: schlager. In Sweden, schlager (a German word literally meaning a "hit") represents any song associated with the competition, from the jazz music featured heavily in the 1960s to entries such as Linda Bengtzing's in 2006. Christine Demsteader of The Local described Swedish schlager as "typically characterized by an annoyingly repetitive melody and trivial lyrics of little or no meaning".

Jazz artists such as Monica Zetterlund and Östen Warnerbring won the event in the 1960s. ABBA, who won Eurovision in 1974, went on to be Sweden's most successful music export. The group influenced not only Melodifestivalen, but the entire Swedish mainstream music scene. In the 1980s, Bert Karlsson's Mariann Grammofon record label was responsible for the prevalence of "easy, memorable tunes". The early twenty-first century has seen more variety in the competition, such as Afro-dite's 2002 disco winner and The Ark's 2007 "retro glam rock" effort.

On-stage gimmicks have long been a part of performances at the competition. Lena Philipsson's use of a microphone stand in her performance of "Det gör ont" at the 2004 competition is an example. When Philipsson hosted Melodifestivalen in 2006, four tongue-in-cheek short films were broadcast during the heats to show what had happened to the microphone stand in the years since her win. Pyrotechnics are another common gimmick in Melodifestivalen performances. After the 2007 event, Karolina Lassbo of Dagens Media criticised the festival's musical content and production, arguing that the 1988 competition was "the time when Melodifestivalen was still a schlager competition" and the event had become "a cross between [reality series] Fame Factory and [inter-city game show] Stadskampen".

== See also ==
- Lilla Melodifestivalen

== Bibliography ==
- Leif Thorsson. Melodifestivalen genom tiderna (1999, second edition 2006). Stockholm: Premium Publishing AB. ISBN 91-89136-29-2.
