= My Turn (EP) =

EP by John Lundvik
- Released: 10 May 2019
- Recorded: 2018
- Genre: Pop
- Label: Warner Music Sweden

John Lundvik chronology
My Turn (2019)	Välkommen jul (2021)

Singles from My Turn
- 1. "My Turn" Released: 24 February 2018; 2. "Too Late for Love" Released: 23 February 2019

My Turn is the debut EP by Swedish singer and songwriter John Lundvik. It was released on 10 May 2019 by Warner Music Sweden. The EP includes the singles "My Turn" and "Too Late for Love". The EP peaked at number 39 on the Swedish Albums Chart.

== Critical reception ==
Scandipop.co.uk gave the EP a positive review stating, "All very different from each other. ‘Loving You’ sounds like it could have been Margaret's next Melodifestivalen entry, ‘Sucker For Ya’ is an up-tempo, rousing, retro-soul jam, and ‘Say I Do’ is the soppy ballad we were all expecting to be on here. They're all pretty excellent, actually, what with him being a dab hand at the ol’ songwriting lark. But our personal fave (of the new ones at least) is ‘Loving You’. It sounds like his next big hit."

== Singles ==
"My Turn" was released as the first single from the EP on 24 February 2018. The song peaked at number 10 on the Swedish Singles Chart. The song competed in Melodifestivalen 2018, where it qualified to the final from the first semi-final, finishing in 3rd place overall. "Too Late for Love" was released as the second single from the EP on 23 February 2019. The song peaked at number 1 on the Swedish Singles Chart. The song competed in Melodifestivalen 2019, it song reached the final and won. The song represented Sweden at the Eurovision Song Contest 2019. It was performed during the second semi-final and qualified for the final. It finished in fifth place with 334 points.

== Track listing ==
No.	Title	Writer(s)	Producer(s)	Length
1.	"Say I Do"	John Lundvik; Anderz Wrethov; Andreas "Stone" Johansson	Wrethov; Johansson	3:04
2.	"Loving You"	Lundvik; Wrethov; Elize Ryd; Henric Pierroff; Linnea Deb	Wrethov	3:05
3.	"Too Late for Love"	Lundvik; Wrethov; Johansson	Wrethov; Johansson	2:58
4.	"Sucker for Ya"	Lundvik; Wrethov; Johansson	Wrethov; Johansson	3:04
5.	"My Turn"	Lundvik; Jonas Thander; Anna-Klara Folin	Pontus Persson	3:02

== Chart performance ==
Chart (2019)	Peak position
Swedish Albums (Sverigetopplistan)	39
