= My Turn (John Lundvik song) =

Single by John Lundvik

from the EP My Turn
- Released: 24 February 2018
- Length: 3:02
- Label: Warner Music Sweden
- Songwriter(s): John Lundvik; Jonas Thander; Anna-Klara Folin

John Lundvik singles chronology
"Christmas" (2017)	"My Turn" (2018)	"Too Late for Love" (2019)

"My Turn" is a song performed by Swedish singer John Lundvik. The song made it to the final of Melodifestivalen 2018 as the second-placed song from Heat 1, which took place on 3 February 2018.

== Charts ==
Chart (2018)	Peak position
Sweden (Sverigetopplistan)	10
