= Cirkus (Stockholm) =

Arena in Djurgården, Stockholm, Sweden

Coordinates: 59.324915°N 18.099933°E

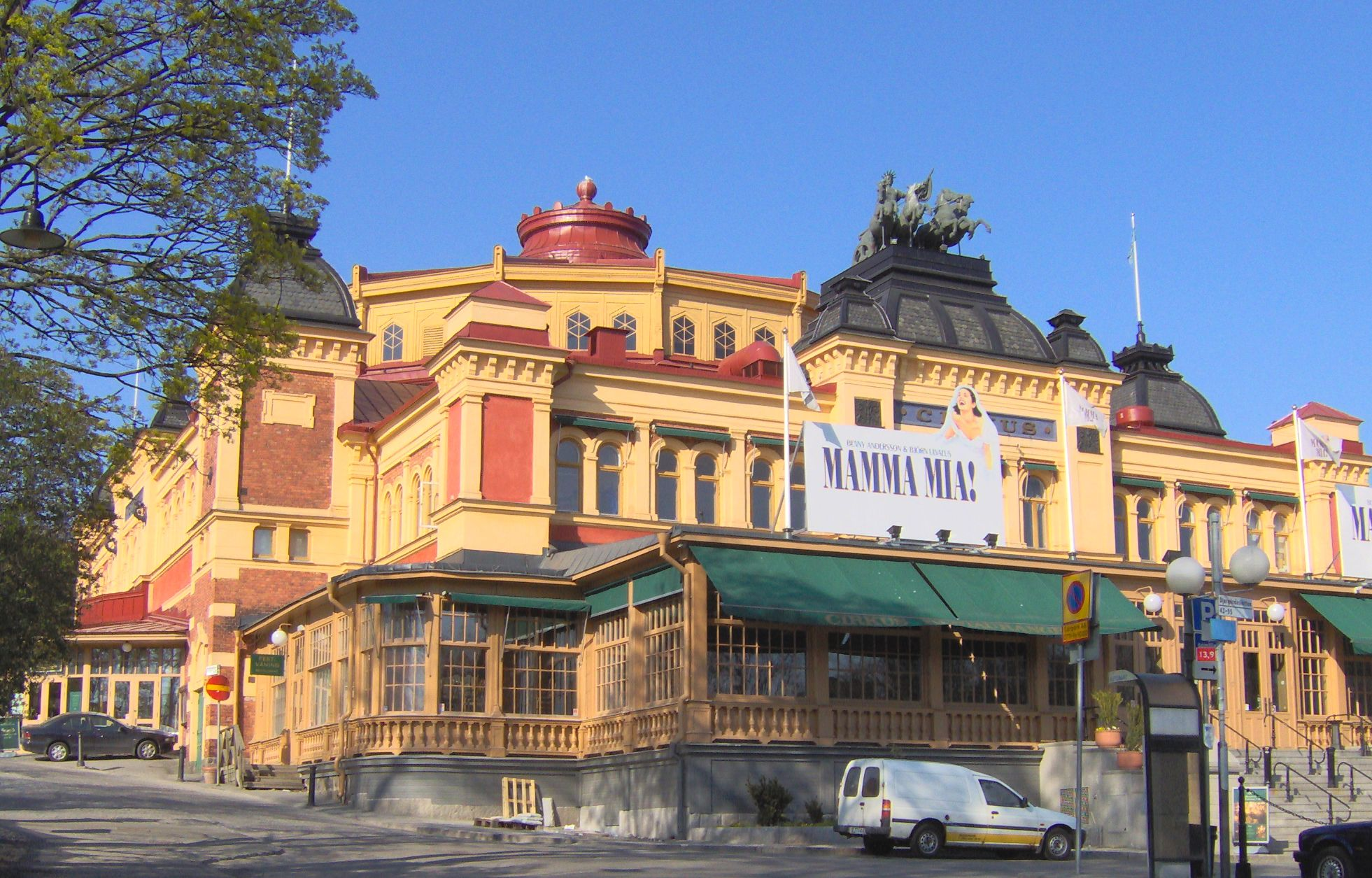
- Mamma Mia! showing at Cirkus in 2006.
- Interactive map of Cirkus
- Full name: Cirkusteatern
- Former names: Cirkusteatern
- Location: Djurgården, Stockholm, Sweden
- Owner: Cirkus Arena och Restaurang AB
- Capacity: 1,650

Construction
- Opened: 1892

Cirkus (Swedish: Cirkus Arena och Restaurang AB) is an arena in Djurgården, Stockholm, Sweden, that holds 1,650 people. It was originally used as a circus (the old official name being Cirkusteatern), but is today mostly used for concerts and musical shows.

The French circus performer Didier Gautier became a Swedish citizen in 1830, and was granted permission to build a permanent circus building on Djurgården in Stockholm. In 1869 Didi Gautier sold his circus Didier Gautiers menagerie to Adèle Houcke. The building took fire later, and was rebuilt in 1892 as present Djurgårdscircus.
