= John Lundvik =

Swedish singer (born 1983)

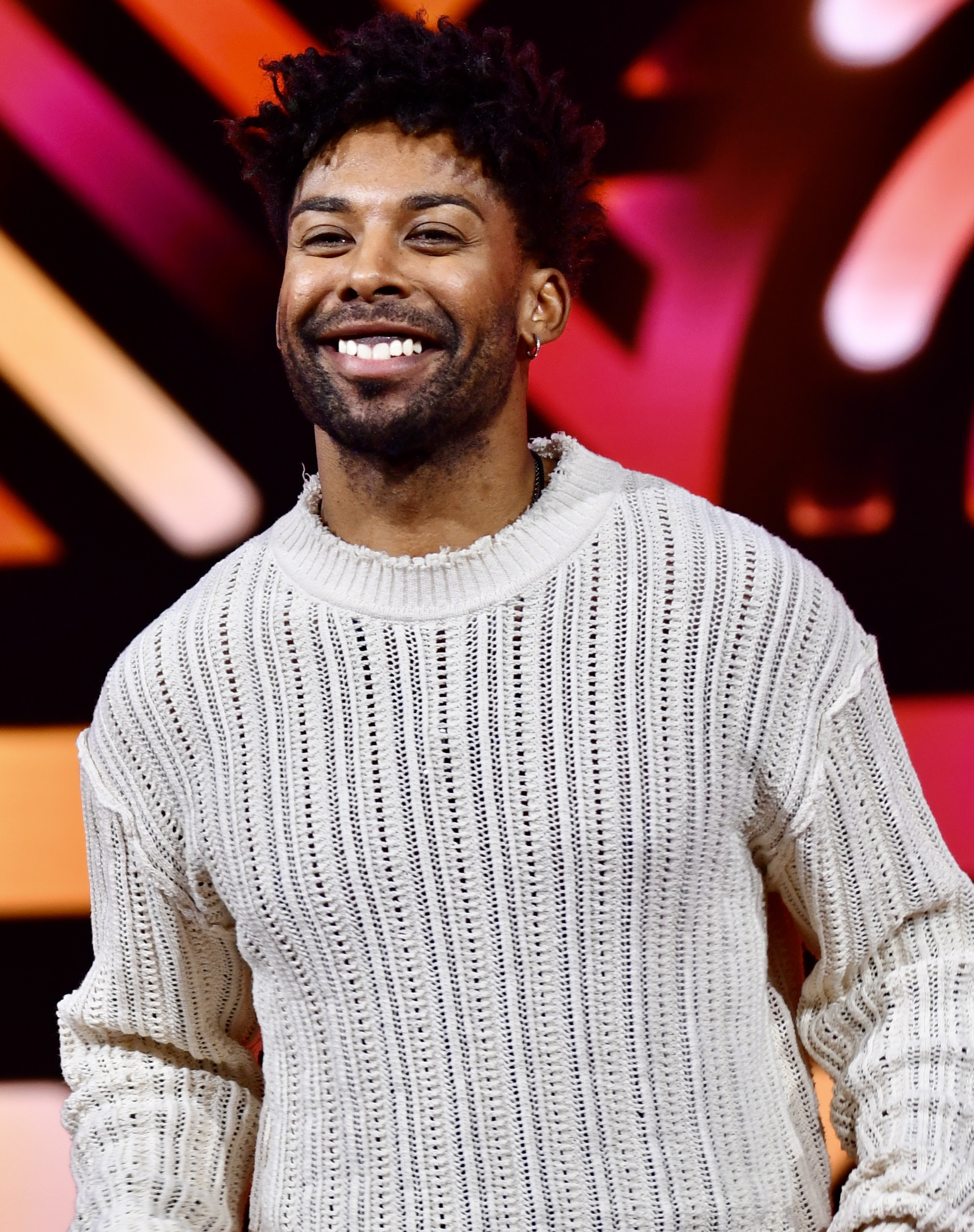
- Lundvik in January 2025

Background information
- Born: 27 January 1983 (age 43); London, England
- Origin: Växjö, Sweden
- Genres: Pop; R&B; soul
- Occupations: Singer; songwriter; sprinter
- Years active: 2010–present
- Website: johnlundvik.se

John Lundvik (Swedish: [ˈjɔnː ˈlɵ̌nː(d)viːk, -vɪk]; born 27 January 1983) is a Swedish singer and former sprinter. He was part of the athletic team for IFK Växjö. Lundvik also has a singing and songwriter career having composed songs for films and the Wedding of Victoria, Crown Princess of Sweden, and Daniel Westling in 2010.

In 2018, he competed in Melodifestivalen with his song "My Turn", finishing in third place. He represented Sweden in the Eurovision Song Contest 2019 with his song "Too Late for Love", finishing in fifth place. In the same contest, he represented the United Kingdom as one of the songwriters of "Bigger than Us" performed by Michael Rice, which finished in 26th place (last).

== Early life ==
Lundvik was born in London, and was adopted by Swedish expatriates in the UK when he was one week old. He lived in London until the age of six when his family returned to Sweden, settling in Växjö. He has never met his biological parents.

== Athletics ==
Lundvik was an avid sportsman. He won many medals including gold at youth and junior level and participated in the Youth Finns Campaign 2001. In 2005, Lundvik was a member of the 4 × 100 metres relay team for IFK Växjö, which earned a bronze medal at the 2005 Swedish Championships.

=== Personal bests ===
- 60 metres: 6.99 seconds (Växjö, 3 February 2002)
- 100 metres: 10.84 seconds (Karlskrona, 12 June 2006)
- 200 metres: 22.42 seconds (Vellinge, 17 August 2003)

== Musical career ==
=== 2010–2018: Songwriting and Melodifestivalen 2018 ===
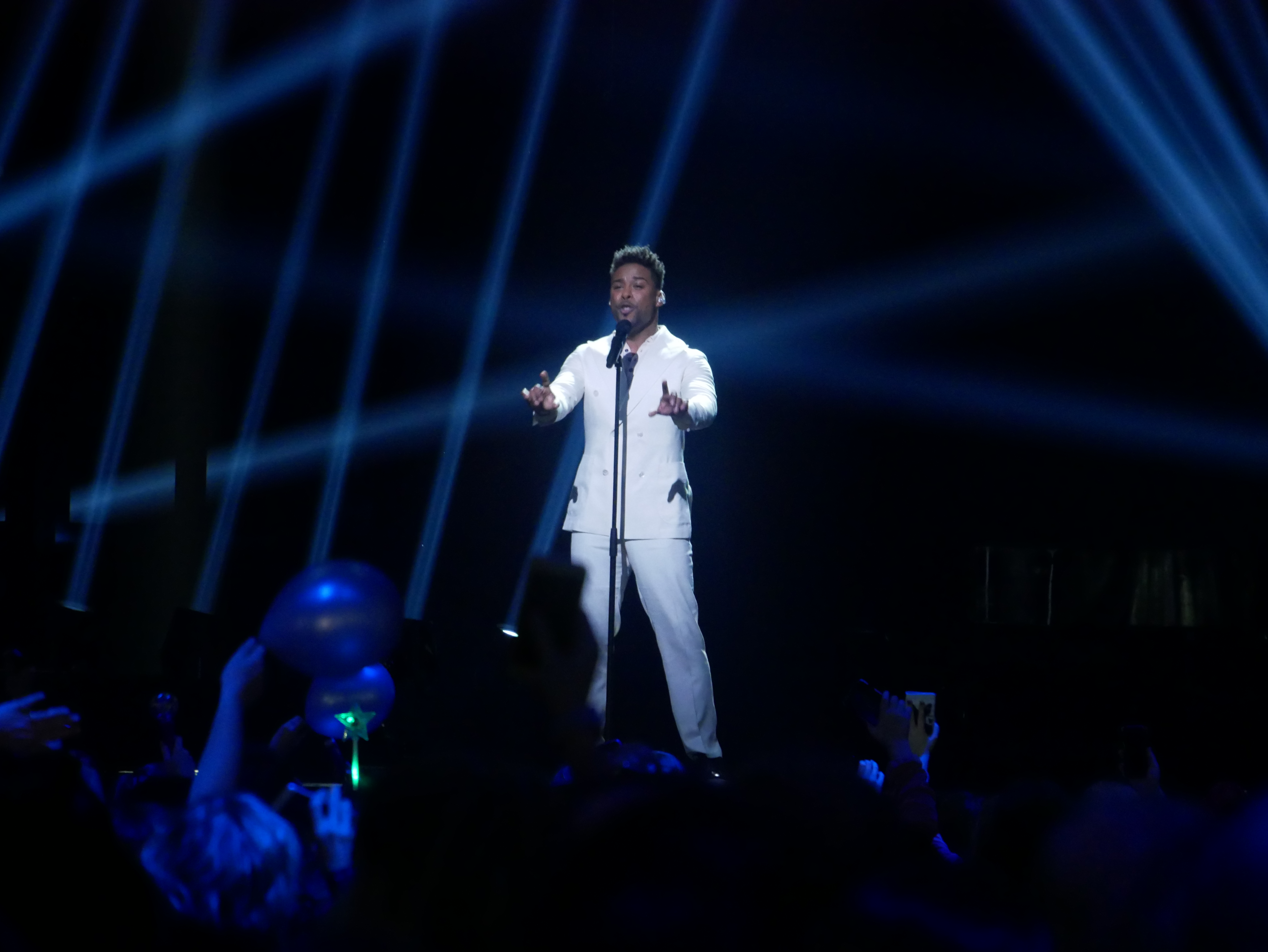
Lundvik performing at the Melodifestivalen 2018.

Lundvik started his musical career in 2010, composing the song "When You Tell the World You're Mine" for the wedding of Victoria, Crown Princess of Sweden, and Daniel Westling. Lundvik went on to compose music for musicians such as Anton Ewald, Isac Elliot, and Sanna Nielsen, in addition to composing music for the film Easy Money. He has also composed music for the American TV series Empire.

In 2016, Lundvik wrote and performed "All About the Games", the Swedish song for the Olympic Games in Rio de Janeiro. In 2016, he also took part in Allsång på Skansen, performing a duet with Lill Lindfors. In 2018, Lundvik took part in Melodifestivalen with the song "My Turn", in a bid to represent Sweden in Eurovision Song Contest 2018. He qualified from the first semi-final directly to the finals, and finished third overall.

=== 2019–present: Eurovision Song Contest ===
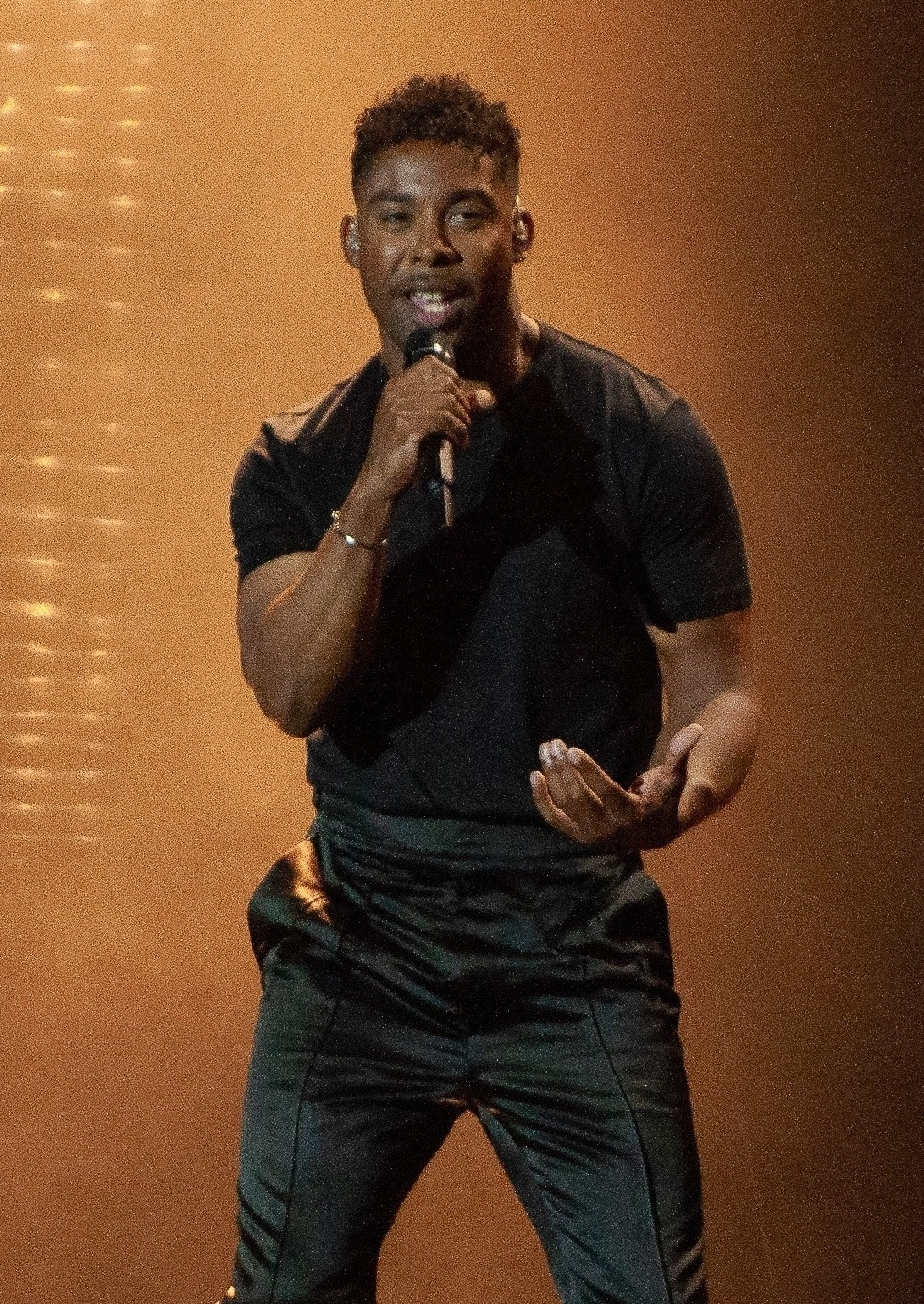
Lundvik performing at the Eurovision Song Contest 2019.

He participated in Melodifestivalen 2019 with the song "Too Late for Love", where he advanced directly to the final. The song reached number one on the Sverigetopplistan singles chart in March 2019. It eventually won Melodifestivalen, represented Sweden at the Eurovision Song Contest 2019 in Tel Aviv, Israel in the second semi-final. The song qualified for the final and finished fifth overall with 334 points.

Concurrently, he composed "Bigger Than Us", the winning song in the UK selection, and the version sung by Michael Rice was selected to represent the United Kingdom in Eurovision 2019. It finished last in the final.

On 16 February 2020, it was announced that Lundvik was one of the songwriters that composed "Mon alliée (The Best in Me)", the French entry for the Eurovision Song Contest 2020.

He participated in Melodifestivalen 2022 with the song "Änglavakt". He performed on 12 February 2022 in the first round and finished second, qualifying directly to the final. He performed at the final on 12 March 2022 and finished in eighth place with 60 points.

Lundvik participated in Melodifestivalen 2025 with the song "Voice of the Silent". He qualified directly to the final after competing in heat one on 1 February 2025. In the final on 8 March 2025 Lundvik placed sixth.

== Other appearances ==
In 2020, Lundvik participated as a celebrity dancer in the fifteenth season of the Swedish dancing show Let's Dance and won the competition, beating Sussie Eriksson in the final.

== Discography ==
=== Extended plays ===
Title	Details	Peak chart positions
Title	Details	SWE
My Turn	Released: 10 May 2019; Label: Warner Music Sweden; Format: Digital download	39
Välkommen jul	Released: 29 October 2021; Label: Giant, Warner Music Sweden; Format: Digital download	—
Dance Cry Laugh Smile	Released: 6 June 2025; Label: Warner Music Sweden; Format: Digital download	—
Psalm	Released: 28 November 2025; Label: Warner Music Sweden; Format: Digital download	—
"—" denotes a recording that did not chart or was not released in that territory.

=== Singles ===
==== As lead artist ====
Title	Year	Peak chart positions							Album
Title	Year	SWE	BEL (FL) Tip	NLD	NOR	SCO	SWI	UK Down.	Album
"Friday Saturday Sunday"	2015	—	—	—	—	—	—	—	Non-album singles
"Love Your Body"	2016	—	—	—	—	—	—	—	Non-album singles
"All About the Games"	2016	—	—	—	—	—	—	—	Non-album singles
"With You"	2017	—	—	—	—	—	—	—	Non-album singles
"Christmas"	2017	—	—	—	—	—	—	—	Non-album singles
"My Turn"	2018	10	—	—	—	—	—	—	My Turn
"Too Late for Love"	2019	1	29	49	27	40	20	38	My Turn
"One Night in Bangkok"	2019	—	—	—	—	—	—	—	Non-album singles
"Smålandssången"	2021	—	—	—	—	—	—	—	Non-album singles
"Änglavakt"	2022	11	—	—	—	—	—	—	Non-album singles
"Voice of the Silent"	2025	13	—	—	—	—	—	—	Dance Cry Laugh Smile
"Memories" (with John de Sohn)	2025	—	—	—	—	—	—	—	Non-album singles
"—" denotes a recording that did not chart or was not released in that territory.

==== As featured artist ====
Title	Year	Album
"Open Your Eyes" (MARC featuring John Lundvik)	2015	Non-album single

== Compositions ==
Title	Year	Artist
"When You Tell the World You're Mine"	2010	Agnes & Björn
"Natural"	2014	Anton Ewald
"Bigger Than Us"	2019	Michael Rice
"Too Late for Love"	2019	John Lundvik
"Mon alliée (The Best in Me)"	2020	Tom Leeb

Preceded by Benjamin Ingrosso with "Dance You Off"	Melodifestivalen winner 2019	Succeeded by The Mamas with "Move"
