= Too Late for Love (John Lundvik song) =

2019 single by John Lundvik

Single by John Lundvik

from the EP My Turn
- Released: 23 February 2019
- Length: 2:58
- Label: Warner Music Sweden
- Songwriters: John Lundvik; Anderz Wrethov; Andreas "Stone" Johansson

John Lundvik singles chronology
"My Turn" (2018)	"Too Late for Love" (2019)	"One Night in Bangkok" (2019)

Eurovision Song Contest 2019 entry
- Country: Sweden
- Artist: John Lundvik
- Languages: English
- Composers: John Lundvik; Anderz Wrethov; Andreas “Stone” Johansson
- Lyricists: John Lundvik; Anderz Wrethov; Andreas “Stone” Johansson

Finals performance
- Semi-final result: 3rd
- Semi-final points: 238
- Final result: 5th
- Final points: 334

Entry chronology
- ◄ "Dance You Off" (2018)
- "Move" (2020) ►

"Too Late for Love" is a song by Swedish singer John Lundvik. The song was performed for the first time in Melodifestivalen 2019, where it made it to the final. It is Lundvik's first single since "My Turn", and reached number one on the Sverigetopplistan singles chart in March 2019. It eventually won Melodifestivalen 2019, and represented Sweden at the Eurovision Song Contest 2019 in Tel Aviv, Israel. It was performed during the second semi-final on 16 May 2019, and qualified for the final. It finished in fifth place with 334 points.

Lundvik was joined by four backing singers on stage, both during Melodifestivalen and the Eurovision Song Contest: Ashley Haynes, Loulou LaMotte, Dinah Yonas Manna and Paris Renita. They went on to form their own group, The Mamas.

== Melodifestivalen ==
Being Lundvik's second participation in the Swedish Eurovision selection, "Too Late for Love" participated in the fourth semi-final of the 2019 Melodifestivalen which was held in Lidköping's Sparbanken Lidköping Arena on 23 February 2019. The song was performed last at the semi-final and it direct qualified to the final. On 9 March, during the final at the Friends Arena in Stockholm, Lundvik performed the song at the tenth position of the running order. "Too Late for Love" won the selection with 96 points from the international juries (only song at Melodifestivalen to have received 12 points from all the jury groups) and 85 points from the public vote, receiving 181 points in total.

== Eurovision Song Contest ==
The song was performed on 16 May 2019 in the first half of the second semi-final of Eurovision Song Contest in Tel Aviv, Israel. It qualified for the final, which was held on 18 May 2019. It finished in fifth place with 334 points.

Among other songs it competed against the entry from the United Kingdom, "Bigger than Us", also written by John Lundvik, and originally intended to be performed by Lundvik in Melodifestivalen.

== Charts ==
=== Weekly charts ===
Weekly chart performance for "Too Late for Love"
Chart (2019)	Peak position
Belgium (Ultratip Bubbling Under Flanders)	29
Estonia (Eesti Tipp-40)	13
Iceland (Tónlistinn)	3
Lithuania (AGATA)	6
Netherlands (Single Top 100)	50
Norway (VG-lista)	27
Scottish Singles Sales (Official Charts)	40
Sweden (Sverigetopplistan)	1
Switzerland (Schweizer Hitparade)	20
UK Singles Downloads (Official Charts)	38

=== Year-end charts ===
2019 year-end chart performance for "Too Late for Love"
Chart (2019)	Position
Iceland (Tónlistinn)	42
Sweden (Sverigetopplistan)	14

== Certifications ==
Certifications for "Too Late for Love"
Region	Certification	Certified units/sales
Sweden (GLF)	2× Platinum	16,000,000^{†}
^{†} Streaming-only figures based on certification alone.
