= Carola Häggkvist discography =

- Studio albums: 20
- Extended plays: 2
- Soundtrack albums: 1
- Compilation albums: 7
- Singles: 29

This article includes the discography of the Swedish singer Carola Häggkvist, who has released 20 studio albums, seven compilation albums, two EPs, and 29 singles.

== Albums ==
All regularly released albums and their chart positions in the Sweden Top 60 (SWE), Norway (NOR), Denmark (DEN) and Finland (FIN).

=== Studio albums ===
List of studio albums, with selected peak chart positions, sales and certifications
Title	Details	Peak positions				Sales and certifications
Title	Details	SWE	NOR	FIN	DEN	Sales and certifications
Främling	Released: 26 March 1983; Format: LP, CD; Language: Swedish, English; Released in: Sweden, Norway and Denmark	1	2	14	4	WW: 1,000,000
Steg för steg	Released: 12 April 1984; Format: LP, CD; Language: Swedish, English; Released in: Sweden, Norway, Denmark	1	2	1	2	
På egna ben	Released: 28 November 1984; Format: LP, CD; Language: Swedish, English; Released in: Europe, Canada	5	10	5	10	
Runaway	Released: 12 May 1986; Format: LP, CD; Language: English; Released in: Sweden, Norway, Denmark, Finland, West Germany	2	9	22	11	
Much More	Released: 9 October 1990; Format: CD; Language: English; Released in: Sweden, Norway, Denmark	16	—	—	—	
Jul	Released: 22 November 1991; Format: CD; Language: Swedish; Released in: Sweden, Norway, Denmark	2	—	—	—	
My Tribute	Released: 25 October 1993; Format: CD; Language: English; Released in: Sweden, Norway, Denmark	21	—	—	—	SWE: Gold
Personligt	Released: 27 October 1994; Language: Swedish; Released in: Sweden, Norway, Denmark; Format: CD	14	—	—	—	SWE: Gold
Blott en dag	Released: 21 October 1998; Language: Swedish; Released in: Sweden, Norway, Denmark; Format: CD	24	32	—	44	
Jul i Betlehem	Released: 10 November 1999; Language: Swedish, English, Norwegian; Released in: Sweden, Norway, Denmark, Finland; Format: CD	1	6	—	7	SWE: 2× Platinum; WW: 600,000
Sov på min arm	Released: 14 February 2001; Language: Swedish; Released in: Sweden, Norway, Denmark; Format: CD	1	18	—	—	
My Show	Released: 19 November 2001; Language: English; Released in: Sweden, Norway, Denmark; Format: CD	6	—	—	—	SWE: Gold
Credo	Released: 31 May 2004; Language: Swedish; Released in: Sweden, Norway, Denmark, Finland; Format: CD, digital download	2	—	—	—	SWE: Gold
Störst av allt	Released: 25 April 2005; Language: Swedish, English; Released in: Sweden, Norway, Denmark; Format: CD, digital download	1	16	—	19	SWE: Gold
Från nu till evighet	Released: 17 May 2006; Language: Swedish, English; Released in: Sweden, Norway, Denmark, Finland; Format: CD, digital download	1	23	22	25	SWE: Platinum
I denna natt blir världen ny – Jul i Betlehem II	Released: 12 November 2007; Language: Swedish, English, Norwegian; Released in: Sweden, Norway, Denmark, Finland; Format: CD, digital download	1	21	7	21	SWE: Platinum
Christmas in Bethlehem	Released: 11 November 2009; Language: English; Released in: Sweden, Norway, Denmark, Finland; Format: CD, digital download	2	—	—	—	
Elvis, Barbra & jag	Released: 23 March 2011; Format: CD, digital download; Language: English; Released in: Sweden, Norway, Denmark, Finland	1	—	—	—	
Drömmen om julen	Released: 28 October 2016; Format: CD, digital download; Language: Swedish	6	—	—	—	
Via Dolorosa – Maria Magdalenas kärlek	Released: 11 April 2025; Format: digital download; Language: Swedish	—	—	—	—	

=== Compilation albums ===
List of compilation albums, with selected peak chart positions and certifications
Title	Details	Peak positions		Certifications
Title	Details	SWE	NOR	Certifications
Happy Days	Released: 19 November 1985; Format: LP, CD; Language: Swedish, English; Released in: Sweden	—	—	
Carola Hits	Released: 6 June 1991; Format: CD; Language: Swedish, English; Released in: Sweden, Norway, Denmark	20	—	
Carola Hits 2	Released: 27 November 1996; Language: Swedish, English; Released in: Sweden, Norway, Denmark; Format: CD	50	—	
Det bästa av Carola	Released: 19 November 1997; Language: Swedish, English; Released in: Sweden, Norway, Denmark; Format: CD	40	—	
Guld, platina & passion	Released: 24 May 2003; Language: Swedish, English; Released in: Sweden, Norway, Denmark; Format: CD	1	5	SWE: 4× Platinum
18 bästa	Released: 29 December 2004; Language: Swedish, English; Released in: Sweden; Format: CD, digital download	15	—	
Främling 25 år	Released: 20 February 2008; Language: Swedish, English; Released in: Sweden, Norway, Denmark, Finland; Format: CD, digital download	2	—	SWE: Gold

== Extended plays ==
List of EPs, with selected details and peak chart positions
Title	Details	Peak positions		
Title	Details	SWE	NOR	DEN
Julefrid med Carola	Released: 1983; Language: Swedish, English; Released in: Sweden, Norway, Denmark; Format: EP	17	12	14

== Singles ==
List of singles, with selected chart positions
Year	Title	Chart positions		Album
Year	Title	SWE	NOR	Album
1983	"Främling"/"Liv"	5	1	Främling
1983	"Love Isn't Love"/"It's Raining in Stockholm"	—	—	Främling
1983	"Hunger"/"Ännu en dag"	3	7	Främling
1984	"Tommy Loves Me"/"I Think I Like It"	10	9	Steg för steg
1984	"Fushigi na hitomi (Don't Tell Me What to Do)"/"Rendez-vous"	—	—	Steg för steg
1986	"The Runaway"/"So Far So Good"	3	—	Runaway
1986	"Brand New Heart"/"Spread Your Wings (For Your Love)"	—	—	Runaway
1987	"Gospel Train"/"Vilken värld det ska bli"	—	—	Non-album singles
1987	"You've Got a Friend"/"Step by Step"	—	—	Non-album singles
1990	"Mitt i ett äventyr"/"All the Reasons to Live"	5	—	Carola Hits
1990	"The Girl Who Had Everything"/"One More Chance"	15	—	Much More
1990	"I'll Live"	—	—	Much More
1990	"Every Beat of My Heart"/"Best Shot"	—	—	Much More
1991	"Fångad av en stormvind"	3	6	Carola Hits
1991	"Stop Tellin' Me Lies"	—	—	Carola Hits
1992	"All the Reasons to Live"	—	—	Non-album single
1994	"Det kommer dagar"/"Flickan från igår"	29	—	My Tribute
1994	"Guld i dina ögon"/"Regnet som faller"	—	—	My Tribute
1994	"Sanningen"/"Var finns den kärlek"	—	—	Personligt
1994	"Sanna vänner"/"Förlåt mig"	—	—	Personligt
1996	"Believe"	—	—	Det bästa av Carola
1997	"Just the Way You Are"	—	—	Det bästa av Carola
1997	"Dreamer"	—	—	Det bästa av Carola
1999	"Himlen i min famn"	—	—	Jul i Betlehem
2001	"Blott en dag"	—	—	Blott en dag
2001	"Sov på min arm"	—	—	Sov på min arm
2001	"The Light"	—	—	My Show
2001	"I Believe in Love"	13	—	My Show
2001	"You + Me"	—	—	My Show
2003	"När löven faller av"	—	—	Guld, platina & passion
2003	"Walk a Mile in My Shoes"	—	—	Guld, platina & passion
2004	"Ditt ord består"	—	—	Credo
2004	"Åt alla"	—	—	Credo
2006	"Invincible"	29	—	Från nu till evighet
2006	"Evighet"	1	8	Från nu till evighet
2006	"Stanna eller gå"	—	—	Från nu till evighet
2007	"I denna natt blir världen ny"	41	—	I denna natt blir världen ny – Jul i Betlehem II
2008	"Lucky Star"	13	—	Non-album singles
2008	"One Love"	11	—	Non-album singles
2011	"Nu tändas tusen juleljus"	32	—	Drömmen om julen
2020	"Vem av oss förstod"	—	—	Via Dolorosa – Maria Magdalenas kärlek
2020	"Säg mig var du står" (with Zara Larsson)	2	—	Non-album singles
2021	"Komma hem till julen"	— (Note: "Komma hem till julen" did not enter the Swedish Singles Chart, but peaked at number one on the Swedish Heatseeker chart.)	—	Non-album singles
2022	"Let's Sing (It's Christmas Time)" (with Måns Zelmerlöw)	48	—	Non-album singles
2023	"To Love Somebody" (with Benjamin Ingrosso)	83	—	Non-album singles
2023	"Helga natt"	— (Note: "Helga natt" did not enter the Swedish Singellista Chart, but peaked at number two on the Swedish Heatseeker Chart.)	—	Non-album singles
2024	"Rör vid mig"	—	—	Non-album singles
2024	"Stjärnorna lyser för oss" (with Viktor Norén)	78	—	Non-album singles
2025	"Via Dolorosa"	—	—	Via Dolorosa – Maria Magdalenas kärlek

== Other songs ==
Year	Title	Chart positions	Album
Year	Title	SWE	Album
2014	"Tell Me This Is Over"	36	Så mycket bättre – Season 5 – Ola Salo Day
2014	"Sjung Halleluja (och Prisa Gud)"	48	Så mycket bättre – Season 5 – Orup Day
2019	"The Day I Die (I Want You to Celebrate)"	96	Så mycket bättre
2019	"You Are the Beginning"	— (Note: "You Are the Beginning" did not enter the Swedish Singellista Chart, but peaked at number seven on the Swedish Heatseeker Chart.)	Så mycket bättre
2023	"Hej mitt vinterland"	42	Julefrid med Carola

== DVDs ==
Title	Details	Chart positions
Title	Details	Sweden DVD
Jubileumsshowen	Released: 19 November 2003	1
Julkonsert	Released: 10 November 2004	2
Live Star (Karaoke)	Released: 22 November 2006	1
