= Jul, jul, strålande jul (Ingvar Wixell album) =

Studio album by Ingvar Wixell
- Released: 1964
- Recorded: Drottningholm Palace Theatre, Stockholm, Sweden, 19–20 September 1964
- Genres: Christmas, opera
- Length: 38 minutes
- Labels: His Master's Voice (1964); EMI (1993)

Ingvar Wixell chronology
Svenska romanser (1963)	Jul, jul, strålande jul (1964)	Ingvar Wixell sjunger Evert Taube (1965)

Jul, jul, strålande jul is a 1964 Christmas album by Ingvar Wixell with Hans Wahlgren's band. It was rerelased in 1993.

== Track listing ==
1. Julsång (Cantique de Noel) - Adolphe Adam
2. När det lider mot jul (Det strålar en stjärna) - Ruben Liljefors, Jeanna Oterdahl
3. Det är en ros utsprungen (Es ist ein Ros entsprungen) - anonymous
4. I juletid - Gustaf Nordqvist, Paul Nilsson
5. Kom jul, med klara, vita ljus - Sven Skiöld, Karl-Erik Forsslund
6. Jul, jul, strålande jul - Gustav Nordqvist, Edvard Evers
7. Hosianna - Georg Joseph Vogler
8. Det brinner en stjärna i Österland - David Wikander, Paul Nilsson
9. Stilla natt (Stille Nacht, Heilige Nacht) - Franz Gruber, Carl Oskar Malmström
10. Betlehems stjärna (Gläns över sjö och strand) - Alice Tegnér, Viktor Rydberg
11. Ett barn är fött på denna dag - trad.
12. Nu är det advent - Gustaf Nordqvist, Erik Natan Söderberg
13. Nu tändas tusen juleljus - Emmy Köhler
14. Gören portarna höga - Gunnar Wennerberg
