= Röda dagar =

Studio album by Erik Linder
- Released: 2013
- Genre: Christmas, pop
- Length: 49 minutes
- Label: Tilia
- Producer: Johan Randén

Erik Linder chronology
På riktigt (2012)	Röda dagar (2013)

Röda dagar is a 2013 Erik Linder Christmas album.

== Track listing ==
1. Jul, jul, strålande jul (Gustaf Nordqvist, Edvard Evers)
2. Röda dagar (Erik Linder, Johan Randén, Nicklas Eklund)
3. Gläns över sjö och strand (Ivar Widén, Viktor Rydberg)
4. Jul i stan (Johan Larsson, Erik Linder)
5. Stilla natt (Stille Nacht, heilige Nacht) (Franz Gruber, Torsten Fogelqvist)
6. Jag känner lugnet i kväll (Erik Linder)
7. Julen är här igen (Erik Linder, Fredrik Wide)
8. Min gamla stad (Jörgen Toresson)
9. När det lider mot jul (Det strålar en stjärna) (Ruben Liljefors, Jeanna Oterdahl)
10. När julen knackar på (Erik Linder, Nicklas Eklund)
11. Julsång (Cantique de Noël) (Adolphe Adam, Augustin Kock)
12. Vinternatt (Erik Linder, Johan Randén)
13. Ave Maria (Franz Schubert, Ture Rangström)

== Contributors ==
- Erik Linder - vocals
- Fredrik Wide - piano, keyboards
- Bengan Andersson - drums
- Sven Lindvall - double bass
- Sebastian Freij - violoncello
- Martin Lindqvist - saxophone
- Johan Randén - guitar, bass, producer

== Charts ==
Chart (2013)	Peak position
Swedish Albums (Sverigetopplistan)	46
