= Stilla jul =

Studio album by Åsa Jinder
- Released: 1991
- Genre: Christmas, folk
- Length: 36 minutes
- Label: Mariann

Åsa Jinder chronology
Dansa mig en glädje (1990)	Stilla jul (1991)	Och himmelen därtill (1993)

Stilla jul is a 1991 Christmas album by Åsa Jinder.

== Track listing ==
1. Jul, jul, strålande jul (Gustaf Nordqvist, Edvard Evers)
2. Bereden väg för Herran (Frans Michael Franzén)
3. Stilla natt (Stille Nacht, heilige Nacht) (Franz Gruber)
4. Nu tändas tusen juleljus (Emmy Köhler)
5. Julfrid och glädje (Åsa Jinder)
6. När det lider mot jul (Det strålar en stjärna) (Ruben Liljefors)
7. Ett barn är fött (trad., arr. Lennart Sjöholm)
8. Betlehems stjärna (Alice Tegnér)
9. Away in a Manger (William J. Kirkpatrick)
10. Santa Lucia (Teodoro Cottrau)
11. Vem är det barnet (trad., arr. Lennart Sjöholm)
12. Härlig är jorden (Schönster Herr Jesu) (trad., arr. Lennart Sjöholm)

== Artist listing ==
- Åsa Jinder, nyckelharpa
- Katarina Johansson, oboe
- Benny Johansson, clarinet
- Magnus Lind, accordion
- Peter Ljung, piano
