= Jul, jul, strålande jul (Nils Börge Gårdh album) =

Jul, jul strålande jul

Studio album by Nils Börge Gårdh
- Released: 2001
- Recorded: August 2001
- Studio: Berghem Studio
- Genre: Christmas
- Length: 39 minutes
- Label: Frituna

Nils Börge Gårdh chronology
I herrens händer (1983)	Jul, jul strålande jul (2001)

Jul, jul strålande jul is a 2001 Nils Börge Gårdh Christmas album.

== Track listing ==
1. När det lider mot jul (Det strålar en stjärna) (Ruben Liljefors, Jeanna Oterdahl)
2. Jag är så glad var julekväll (trad.)
3. Församlens i trogne (John Francis Wade)
4. O Betlehem, du lilla stad (O Little Town of Bethlehem) (Lewis Redner, Anders Frostenson)
5. Det hände sig för länge sen (Mary's Boy Child) (Jester Hairston, Jan Erixon)
6. Jul, jul, strålande jul (Hugo Hammarström, Edvard Evers)
7. Betlehems stjärna (Viktor Rydberg, Alice Tegnér)
8. Jag drömmer om en jul hemma (White Christmas) (Irving Berlin, Karl Lennart)
9. Bereden väg för Herran (Frans Michael Franzén, trad.)
10. Stilla natt (Stille nacht, heilige nacht) (Franz Gruber, Oscar Mannström)
11. Nu tändas tusen juleljus (Emmy Köhler)
12. Julsång (Cantique de Noël) (Adolphe Adam)

== Contributors ==
- Nils-Börge Gårdh - vocals
- Alf Andersson - keyboard
- Joachim Sundler - drums, percussion
- Bo Hellgren - bass
- Conny Axelsson - guitar
