= En julhälsning från Nils-Börge Gårdh =

Studio album by Nils Börge Gårdh
- Released: 1978
- Genre: Christmas
- Label: Signatur

Nils Börge Gårdh chronology
Kärleken från dej (1976)	En julhälsning från Nils-Börge Gårdh (1978)	I herrens händer (1983)

En julhälsning från Nils-Börge Gårdh is a 1978 Nils Börge Gårdh Christmas album.

== Låtlista ==
1. Jul, jul, strålande jul (Gustaf Nordqvist, Edvard Evers)
2. Det hände sig för länge sen (Mary's Boy Child) (Jester Hairston, Jan Erixon)
3. Nu tändas tusen juleljus (Emmy Köhler)
4. Gå Sion din konung att möta (Be Glad in the Lord and Rejoice) (James Mcgranahan, Erik Nyström)
5. Jag drömmer om en jul hemma (White Christmas) (Irving Berlin, Karl Lennart)
6. Ett barn är fött (trad.)
7. O helga natt (Cantique de Noël) (Adolphe Adam)
8. Var hälsad, sköna morgonstund (Wie schön leuchtet der Morgenstern) (Philipp Nicolai, Johan Olof Wallin)
9. Stilla natt (Stille Nacht, heilige Nacht) (Franz Gruber, Torsten Fogelqvist)
10. När juldagsmorgon glimmar (trad.)
11. Fröjdas vart sinne (Theodor Söderberg, Nils Frykman)
12. Låt mig få tända ett ljus (Mozart's lullaby) (Bernhard Flies)
13. O kommen i tronge (Adeste Fideles) (John Francis Wade)
14. Gläns över sjö och strand (Viktor Rydberg, Alice Tegnér)
