= Främling 25 år =

Greatest hits album by Carola
- Released: 20 February 2008
- Recorded: 1983–2007
- Genres: Gospel, pop, rock
- Label: Sony BMG

Carola chronology
I denna natt blir världen ny - Jul i Betlehem II (2007)	Främling 25 år (2008)	Christmas in Bethlehem (2009)

Främling 25 år is a greatest hits album by Swedish singer Carola Häggkvist.

== Track listing ==
=== CD 1 ===
1. Främling
2. Säg mig var du står
3. Benjamin
4. Gör det någonting
5. Gloria
6. You Bring Out the Best in Me
7. Mickey
8. Se på mig
9. Liv
10. Visa lite mänsklighet
11. 14 maj
12. Du försvinner i natten
13. Främling / Je ogen hebben geen geheimen / Love isn't Love / Fremder *
14. Mitt i ett äventyr
15. Fångad av en stormvind
16. Evighet

=== CD 2 ===
1. Sometimes When We Touch
2. Om du törs
3. Butterfly *
4. Säg mig var vi står
5. Albatross *
6. Hunger
7. Tokyo
8. Du lever inom mig
9. I en sommarnatt
10. Let There Be Love *
11. Gospel medley (live)
12. Elvis medley (live) *
13. What a Feeling (live) *
14. Fame (live) *
15. Love isn't Love (Främling)
16. You Are My Destiny
17. Captured by a Lovestorm
18. Invincible

Previously not released on CD *

== Release history ==
Country	Date	Format
Denmark	20 February 2008	Compact disc, Music download
Finland	20 February 2008	Compact disc, Music download
Norway	20 February 2008	Compact disc, Music download
Sweden	20 February 2008	Compact disc, Music download

== Charts ==
Chart (2008)	Peak position
Swedish Albums (Sverigetopplistan)	2
