= Jul (Loa Falkman album) =

Studio album by Loa Falkman
- Released: 2013
- Studio: Atlantis Studios, RMV studio, Heaven studio
- Genre: Christmas, operapop
- Length: 41 minutes
- Label: Sony Music Entertainment
- Producer: Lars Halapi

Loa Falkman chronology
Kom i min famn (2012)	Jul (2013)

Jul is a 2013 Christmas album by Loa Falkman. It peaked at number five on the Swedish Albums Chart.

== Track listing ==
1. Dagen är kommen (Adeste Fideles) (John Francis Wade, Eva Norberg)
2. Jul, jul, strålande jul (Gustaf Nordqvist, Edvard Evers)
3. Bereden väg för Herran (Frans Michael Franzén, trad.)
4. Bella Notte (Sony Burke, Paggy Lee, Gardar Sahlberg, Lennart Reuterskiöld)
5. Gläns över sjö och strand (Betlehems stjärna) (Alice Tegnér, Viktor Rydberg)
6. Giv mig ej glans, ej guld, ej prakt (Jean Sibelius, Zacharias Topelius)
7. O helga natt (Cantique de Noël) (Adolphe Adam, Augustin Kock)
8. Jag finns hos dig (Abide with Me) (William Henry Monk, Ulf Schagerström)
9. Panis angelicus (César Franck, Liturgic text)
10. The Christmas Song (Mel Tormé, Bob Wells)
11. Stilla natt (Stille Nacht, heilige Nacht) (Franz Gruber, Torsten Fogelqvist, Oscar Mannström)
12. De bästa åren kvar (Auld Lang Syne) (Ulf Schagerström, trad.)

== Contributors ==
- Loa Falkman - singer
- Lars Halapi - guitar, mandolin, cittra, percussion, producer
- Peter Korhonen - drums
- Rickard Nilsson - piano, organ, celeste
- Thomas Axelsson - bass

== Charts ==
Chart (2013)	Peak position
Swedish Albums (Sverigetopplistan)	5
