= Jul (Carola Søgaard album) =

Studio album by Carola Søgaard
- Released: 29 November 1991
- Genres: Christmas; folk
- Length: 40:54
- Label: Rival

Carola Søgaard chronology
| Carola Hits (1991) | Jul (1991) | My Tribute (1993) |

Jul is the sixth studio album and first Christmas album by Swedish singer Carola Søgaard, released on November 29, 1991.

== Track listing ==
1. "Jul, jul, strålande jul" – 2:40
2. "Juletid" ("Mistletoe and Wine", duet with Christer Sjögren) – 3:50
3. "Betlehems stjärna" ("Gläns över sjö och strand") – 2:59
4. "O helga natt" ("Cantique de noël") – 4:04
5. "Stilla natt" ("Stille Nacht, heilige Nacht") – 3:20
6. "O Come, All Ye Faithful" ("Adeste Fideles") – 4:02
7. "I vår vackra vita vintervärld / Jingeling Tingeling" ("Winter Wonderland" / "Sleigh Ride") – 2:43
8. "Jag drömmer om en jul hemma" ("White Christmas") – 3:22
9. "Nu tändas tusen juleljus" – 2:41
10. "När det lider mot jul" ("Det strålar en stjärna") – 3:25
11. "Vem är barnet" – 3:38
12. "När juldagsmorgon glimmar" – 2:18
13. "God jul önskar vi er alla" ("We Wish You a Merry Christmas") – 1:52

== Personnel ==
- Peter Ljung – keyboard
- Lasse Wellander – guitar
- Hasse Rosén – guitar
- Kjell Öhman – accordion
- Sam Bengtsson – bass

== Charts ==
Weekly chart performance for Jul
| Chart (1991) | Peak position |
|---|---|
| Swedish Albums (Sverigetopplistan) | 15 |
| Chart (1996) | Peak position |
| Swedish Albums (Sverigetopplistan) | 44 |
| Chart (2019) | Peak position |
| Swedish Albums (Sverigetopplistan) | 5 |
| Chart (2022) | Peak position |
| Swedish Albums (Sverigetopplistan) | 3 |
