= Det bästa av Carola =

Greatest hits album by Carola
- Released: 19 November 1997
- Recorded: 1983–1997
- Genre: Gospel, pop, rock
- Label: Pool Sounds
- Producer: Erik Hillestad

Carola chronology
Carola Hits 2 (1996)	Det bästa av Carola (1997)	Blott en dag (1998)

Det bästa av Carola is a Greatest Hits album by Swedish singer Carola Häggkvist. It was released on November 19, 1997, in Sweden and Norway.

== Track listing ==
=== CD 1 ===
1. Främling
2. Mickey
3. Liv
4. Tommy tycker om mig
5. På egna ben
6. Gloria
7. Det regnar i Stockholm
8. Säg mig var du står
9. Hunger
10. Ännu en dag
11. Brand New Heart
12. The Runaway
13. Mitt i ett äventyr
14. The Girl Who Had Everything
15. I'll Live

=== CD 2 ===
1. Dreamer
2. Every Beat Of My Heart
3. All The Reasons To Live
4. Fångad av en stormvind
5. Oh Happy Day
6. Save The Children
7. Det kommer dagar
8. Guld i dina ögon
9. Sanna vänner
10. Så länge jag lever
11. Det bästa jag vet
12. The Sound Of Music
13. Just The Way You Are
14. Believe
15. Mixade minnen (Radio Mix)

== Release history ==
Country	Date
Norway	19 November 1997
Sweden	19 November 1997

== Charts ==
Chart (1997–1998)	Peak positions
Sweden	40
