= I denna natt blir världen ny – Jul i Betlehem II =

I denna natt blir världen ny - Jul i Betlehem II

Studio album by Carola
- Released: 12 November 2007
- Recorded: 2007
- Genre: Gospel
- Labels: Universal Music, Sonet
- Producer: Erik Hillestad

Carola chronology
Från nu till evighet (2006)	I denna natt blir världen ny - Jul i Betlehem II (2007)	Främling 25 år (2008)

Singles from I denna natt blir världen ny - Jul i Betlehem II
- 1. "I denna natt blir världen ny" Released: 14 November 2007

I denna natt blir världen ny – Jul i Betlehem II is the sixteenth studio album and third Christmas album by Swedish singer Carola Häggkvist. It was released in November 2007 in Sweden, Norway, Denmark and Finland. The album was recorded in Betlehem in mid-2007. The album includes both old Christmas carols and new-written melodies.

== Track listing ==
1. Stilla natt, heliga natt (Stille Nacht, heilige Nacht)
2. Lyss till änglasångens ord
3. Gläns över sjö och strand
4. I denna natt blir världen ny
5. Her kommer dine arme små
6. När det lider mot jul (Det strålar en stjärna)
7. Vid Betlehem en vinternatt (The First Noel)
8. Ett barn är fött på denna dag
9. Mariavisa
10. Jul, jul, strålande jul
11. Marias vaggsång
12. This Child
13. Go Tell It on the Mountain
14. Nu tändas tusen juleljus

== Singles ==
1. I denna natt blir världen ny

== Charts ==
Chart (2007)	Peak position
Norwegian Albums (VG-lista)	12
Swedish Albums (Sverigetopplistan)	1

== Release history ==
Country	Date
Norway	12 November 2007
Sweden	14 November 2007
Denmark	19 November 2007
Finland	21 November 2007
