= 18 bästa =

Compilation album by Carola
- Released: 29 December 2004
- Recorded: 1983–2004
- Genre: Pop, rock
- Length: 68:26
- Label: Universal Music
- Producer: Lasse Holm, Stephan Berg, Ingemar Åberg, Maurice Gibb, Hitvision, Patrik Frisk, Pål Svenre, Erik Hillestad

Carola chronology
Credo (2004)	18 bästa (2004)	Störst av allt (2005)

18 bästa is a compilation album by Swedish singer Carola Häggkvist, released on 29 December 2004. On the album charts, it peaked at number three in Sweden.

== Track listing ==
1. "Främling"
2. "Mickey"
3. "Fångad av en stormvind"
4. "När löven faller"
5. "Mitt i ett äventyr"
6. "Tommy tycker om mig"
7. "Runaway"
8. "I Believe in Love"
9. "Brand New Heart"
10. "Light"
11. "Radiate"
12. "Kiss Goodbye"
13. "Walk a Mile in My Shoes"
14. "If I Can Dream"
15. "Modersvingen"
16. "Himlen i min famn"
17. "Jag vill alltid älska"
18. "Thula Sana"
