= Julstämning =

Studio album by Loa Falkman
- Released: 1990
- Genre: Christmas, operapop
- Length: Circa 42 minutes
- Label: Ladybird Records (1990); Mariann (1995)

Loa Falkman chronology
| Julstämning (1990) | Vår tids psalmer (1997) |

Julstämning is a 1990 Christmas album by Loa Falkman. It was rereleased in 1995.

== Track listing ==
1. Betlehems stjärna (Gläns över sjö och strand) – Alice Tegnér, Viktor Rydberg
2. Psaltarpsalm, nr 24 (Davids psalm, nr 24) (Gören portarna höga) – Gunnar Wennerberg
3. När det lider mot jul (Det strålar en stjärna) – Ruben Liljefors, Jeanna Oterdahl
4. Panis angelicus – C. Franck
5. Stilla natt (Stille Nacht, Heilige Nacht) – Franz Gruber
6. Julsång (Cantique de Noel) – Adolphe Adam
7. Frid på jorden – Billy Butt, Ingela Forsman
8. Jag drömmer om en jul hemma (White Christmas) – Irving Berlin, Karl-Lennart
9. It's Christmas in New York – Billy Butt
10. Låt mig få tända ett ljus (Schlafe mein Prinzchen) – B. Flies, B. Carlsson
11. I'll Be Home for Christmas – (Kim Gannon, Walter Kent, Buck Ram)
12. Julstämning – Lasse Holm, Ingela Forsman

== Contributors ==
Peter Ljung – piano, synthesizer
Bengt Forsberg – organ
Hasse Rosén, Lasse Wellander – guitar
Sam Bengtsson – bass guitar
