= Jaarnek =

Jaarnek is a surname. Notable people with the surname include:

- Carina Jaarnek (1962–2016), Swedish singer
- Towe Jaarnek (born 1965), Swedish singer
