= Störst av allt =

Störst av allt (English: Greatest of all), may refer to:

- Störst av allt (album), by Carola Häggkvist
- Störst av allt (novel), by Malin Persson Giolito
- Störst av allt (TV series), based on the novel
