= Stephan Berg =

Swedish composer and songwriter

Stephan Berg (born 11 February 1957) is a Swedish composer and songwriter. He was the writer of the Carola song Fångad av en stormvind, which won the Eurovision Song Contest in 1991. He also wrote and composed the song Bara hon älskar mig, performed by Blond, winning the 1997 Swedish Eurovision Song Contest preselction.

== Melodifestivalen entries ==
Year	Song	Performer	Melodifestivalen ranking	Eurovision Song Contest ranking
1990	"Mitt i ett äventyr"	Carola Søgaard	2	
1991	"Fångad av en stormvind"	Carola Søgaard	1	1
1991	"Låt mig se ett under"	Tove Naess	5	
1993	"Sjunde himlen"	Lena Pålsson	4	
1994	"Jag stannar hos dig"	Jonny Lindé	Eliminated	
1995	"Joanna"	Nick Borgen	Eliminated	
1997	"Bara hon älskar mig"	Blond	1	14
1998	"Cherie"	Black-Ingvars	5	
1999	"Bilder av dig"	Ai	9	
2000	"Alla änglar sjunger"	Tom Nordahl	9	
