= Välkommen du härliga juletid =

Song
- Language: Swedish
- Published: 1921
- Genre: Christmas
- Composer(s): Ejnar Eklöf; Gustaf Nordqvist (different tune)
- Lyricist(s): Paul Nilsson

Välkommen du härliga juletid or I juletid is a Christmas song with lyrics by Paul Nilsson.

== Compositions ==
1. Music by Ejnar Eklöf, published 1921, also published in Nu ska vi sjunga 1943, under the lines "Julsånger".
2. Music by Gustaf Nordqvist, published in Sveriges melodibok 1947.

== Recordings ==
The song has been recorded by various artists and groups. An early recording was done by Ragnar Blennow in 1928.

== Publication ==
- Julens önskesångbok, 1997, under the lines "Traditionella julsånger".
