= Christmas in Bethlehem =

Studio album by Carola Häggkvist
- Released: 11 November 2009
- Genre: Christmas
- Length: 1 hour, 15 minutes
- Label: X5 Music Group
- Producer: Erik Hillestad

Carola Häggkvist chronology
Hits 25 (2008)	Christmas in Bethlehem (2009)	Elvis, Barbra & jag (2011)

Christmas in Bethlehem is the seventeenth studio album and fourth Christmas album by Carola Häggkvist.

== Track listing ==
1. Heaven in my Arms (Himlen i min famn)
2. Hark, the Herald Angels Sing (with Aygün Beyler and Mahsa Vahdat)
3. Silent Night ("Stille Nacht, helige nacht") (with Hans-Erik Husby)
4. Find My Way to Betlehem
5. Poor, Little Jesus (with Gladys del Pilar)
6. O Holy Night ("Cantique de Noël") (with Paul Potts)
7. From Heaven High
8. Good Christian Men, Rejoice
9. The Little Drummer Boy (with Blues)
10. O Sanctissima
11. Heaven Turned out to be a Child (with Linda Lampenius & Julian Erlandsson)
12. O Little Town of Bethlehem
13. Go Tell It on the Mountain
14. This Very Night the World will Change (I denna natt blir världen ny)
15. O Come All Ye Faithful (Adeste Fideles)

== Charts ==
=== Weekly charts ===
Chart (2009–2010)	Peak position
Norwegian Albums (VG-lista)	36
Swedish Albums (Sverigetopplistan)	4

=== Year-end charts ===
Chart (2009)	Position
Swedish Albums (Sverigetopplistan)	36
