= Much More (album) =

Studio album by Carola Häggkvist
- Released: 9 October 1990
- Recorded: 1990
- Label: Virgin Records
- Producer: Lasse Lindbom, Anders Herrlin, Greg Walsh, Stephan Berg

Carola Häggkvist chronology
Runaway (1986)	Much More (1990)	Carola Hits (1991)

Singles from Much More
- 1. "The Girl Who Had Everything"; 2. "I'll Live"; 3. "Every Beat of My Heart"; 4. "Captured by a Lovestorm"; 5. "All the Reasons to Live"

Much More is the fifth studio album by Swedish singer Carola Häggkvist. The album contains, among others, the winning song from the Eurovision Song Contest 1991, "Fångad av en stormvind".

== Track listings ==
=== Swedish release ===
1. "Every Beat of My Heart" (E Johnson / P Gessle)
2. "The Girl Who Had Everything" (S Diamond)
3. "When I Close My Eyes" (T Norell / Oson)
4. "State of Grace" (S Diamond / S Sheridan)
5. "One More Chance" (E Johnson / R Hampton / S Berg / Carola)
6. "The Innocence Is Gone" (P S Bliss / M Stone)
7. "Declaration of My Independence" (J Friedman/ A R Scott)
8. "I'll Live" (E Wolff / R Daniels)
9. "Best Shot" (S Berg / R Hampton)
10. "All the Reasons to Live" (S Berg / R Hampton)
11. "Stop Running Away from Love" (S Berg / R Hampton)
12. "You Are My Destiny" (?)

=== International release ===
1. "Captured by a Lovestorm"
2. "Every Beat of My Heart"
3. "The Girl Who Had Everything"
4. "When I Close My Eyes"
5. "State of Grace"
6. "I'll Live"
7. "Declaration of My Independence"
8. "The Innocence Is Gone"
9. "Best Shot"
10. "All the Reasons to Live"

== Charts ==
Chart (1990–1991)	Peak position
Swedish Albums (Sverigetopplistan)	16

== Release history ==
Country	Date
Europe	May 1991
Sweden	October 9, 1990
