= More Than a Game (Towe Jaarnek and Peter Jöback song) =

Single by Towe Jaarnek and Peter Jöback
- Released: 1992
- Genre: Pop
- Label: Big Bag
- Songwriter(s): Peter Jöback and Lasse Holm

"More Than a Game" is a song written by Peter Jöback and Lasse Holm, and served as official song for the 1992 UEFA European Championship held in Sweden. Towe Jaarnek and Jöback recorded the song as a duet, and the single peaked at 30th position at the Swedish singles chart. Lyrically, the song deals with being part of a football team, as well as helping/bringing joy each other in life in general.

== Charts ==
Chart (1992)	Peak position
Sweden (Sverigetopplistan)	30
