= Symfonin =

Single by Loa Falkman
- A-side: "Symfonin"
- B-side: "Lady in Red"
- Released: 1990
- Genre: opera pop, schlager
- Label: Little Big Apple
- Songwriters: Elisabeth Lord, Tommy Gunnarsson

"Symfonin" is a song written by Elisabeth Lord and Tommy Gunnarsson, and performed by Loa Falkman at Melodifestivalen 1990. Lyrically, it deals with using music and singing to unite the peoples of the Earth.

The single, which was released the same year, peaked at 17th position at the Swedish singles chart. The song also charted at Svensktoppen for 12 weeks between 25 March-10 June 1990, peaking at second position.

== Charts ==
Chart (1990)	Peak position
Sweden (Sverigetopplistan)	17
