= Drömmen om julen =

Studio album by Carola Häggkvist
- Released: 28 October 2016
- Studios: Nilento studio, Gothenburg, Sweden
- Genres: Christmas album, gospel
- Length: 45 minutes
- Language: Swedish
- Label: Universal Music
- Producer: Peter Nordahl

Carola Häggkvist chronology
Elvis, Barbra & jag (2011)	Drömmen om julen (2016)	Via Dolorosa, Maria Magdalenas kärlek (2025)

Drömmen om julen is the nineteenth studio album and fifth Christmas album by Swedish singer Carola Häggkvist., released on October 28, 2016. The album release was followed up with a Christmas tour throughout Sweden and Norway.

One of the concerts, the one inside the Filadelfia Church in Stockholm on 1 December 2016, was broadcast over P4 Live on 23 December the same year.

== Track listing ==
No.	Title	Writer(s)	Length
1.	"Prolog"	Peter Nordahl
2.	"En sång för barnet"	Ulla-Carin Nyquist
3.	"Vår dröm om julen"	Ulla-Carin Nyquist
4.	"Vintersång (Winter Song)"	Sara Bareilles, Ingrid Michaelson
5.	"Låt barnen leva"	Ulla-Carin Nyquist
6.	"Prelude"	Peter Nordahl
7.	"Det är en ros utsprungen (Es ist ein Ros entsprungen)"
8.	"Tro på en morgon (Refugee Song)"
9.	"Förundrad jag hör (Amazing Grace)"	Traditional, arr. by Peter Nordahl
10.	"Julens budskap"	Ulla-Carin Nyquist
11.	"Adagio"	Peter Nordahl
12.	"Stilla natt (Stille Nacht, heilige Nacht)"	Traditional, arr. by Peter Nordahl
13.	"Nu tändas tusen juleljus"	Emmy Köhler

== Contributing musicians ==
- Carola Häggkvist – vocals
- Peter Nordahl – piano, celesta, arranger, producer
- Mikael Wenhov – violin
- Johanna Tafvelin – violin
- Magnus Ivarsson – violin
- Sonja Vrieze – violin
- Gunnar Enbom – viola
- Crista Bergendahl – viola
- Jan Duda – double bass
- HC Green – percussion

== Charts ==
=== Weekly charts ===
Chart (2016)	Peak position
Swedish Albums (Sverigetopplistan)	6

=== Year-end charts ===
Chart (2016)	Position
Swedish Albums (Sverigetopplistan)	93
