= Erik Linder =

Swedish singer (born 1982)

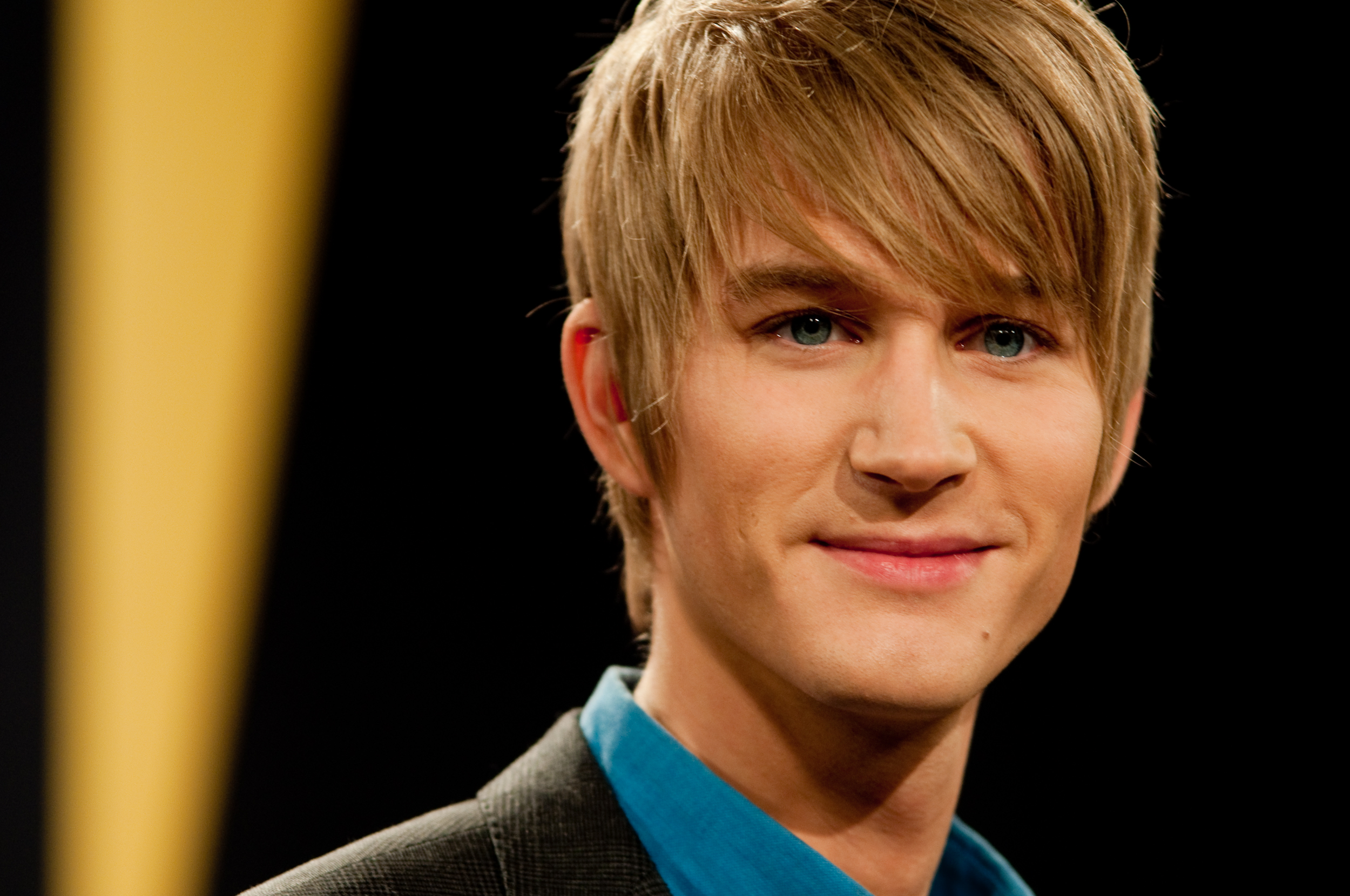

Background information
- Born: February 22, 1982 (age 43); Tyresö, Stockholm County, Sweden
- Genres: Pop
- Occupation: Singer
- Instrument: Vocals
- Years active: 2009–present
- Labels: Columbia Records (2009-2010); Tilia Records (2011-Present)

Erik Linder (born in Tyresö, Stockholm County, Sweden on 22 February 1982) is a Swedish singer.

He started singing very early. He took part in Talang 2009, the third season of the show on Swedish TV4 television channel. He reached semifinal 3 in singing category and was picked as a wildcard for the final. The series was won by magician Charlie Caper.

In 2009, he released his debut album Inifrån on Columbia Records singing contemporary cover versions of Swedish songs like "Tro" (Marie Fredriksson), "Ingen kan älska som vi" (Krister Linder), "Utan dina andetag" (Kent), "Kom änglar" (Lars Winnerbäck), "Miraklet" (Di Leva), "Ängeln i rummet" (Eva Dahlgren) and "För kärlekens skull" (Ted Gärdestad).

He also took part in Melodifestivalen 2010 with "Hur kan jag tro på kärlek", but failed to make it to the final. Still the song charted at #38 in Sverigetopplistan, the official Swedish Singles Chart. He also toured the country in 2010 releasing single "Du". In January 2011, he ended his cooperation with Columbia and released the single "Bara du och jag" on his own record label Tilia Records. On June 6, 2012, he released the single "Himmel, hav och land" from his then upcoming album. The singles subsequently appeared on his album På riktigt, released on 29 August 2012.

== Discography ==
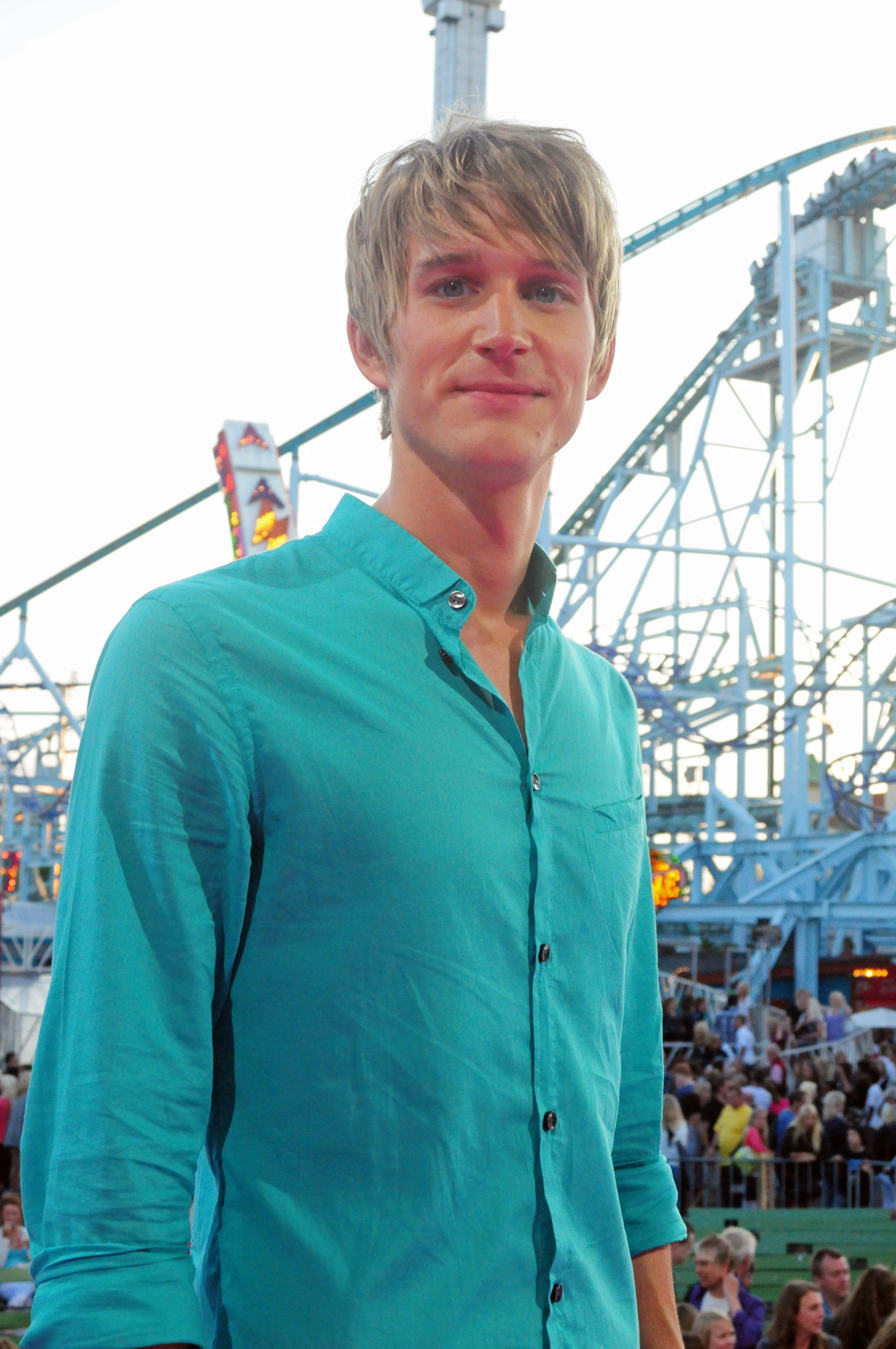
Erik Linder during Sommarkrysset 2009

=== Albums ===
Year	Album details	Peak Position	Certifications
Year	Album details	SWE	Certifications
2009	Inifrån	5	
2012	På riktigt	7	
2013	Röda dagar	46	

=== Singles ===
Year	Single	Peak Position	Certifications	Albums
Year	Single	SWE	Certifications	Albums
2010	"Hur kan jag tro på kärlek"	38		

Other singles

- 2009: "Tro" (from Talang 2009)
- 2009: "Ingen kan älska som vi" (from Talang 2009)
- 2010: "Du"
- 2011: "Bara du och jag"
- 2012: "Himmel, hav och land"
