= Runar Søgaard =

Norwegian life coach and preacher

Runar Søgaard (born 27 June 1967) is a Norwegian leadership trainer, life-coach, motivational speaker and former preacher from Kongsvinger, Hedmark. He was earlier married to singer Carola Häggkvist.

In 2012 his business Vinger Consulting AB was threatened with bankruptcy following a lawsuit by On Strategies LLC.

== Activism ==
In April 2005 he created some reaction during a speech in Stockholm, by saying that the Islamic prophet Muhammad had been a pedophile. This led to some condemnation and protests. During the same sermon he also made disparaging remarks about Jesus and Siddharta. Søgaard received threats from radical Islamists. Author and columnist Jan Guillou at the Aftonbladet newspaper called for calm and wrote "it would be of great harm for Sweden's Muslims if Søgaard was harmed".

== Legal problems ==
In November 2014, Søgaard was convicted for a third time of violating accounting laws, and sentenced by Nacka district court to two months of prison. He served his two-month sentence, by wearing an ankle monitor.

In 2019 he was convicted for tax evasion. In 2021 he lost in appellate court and was sentenced to one year and eight months in prison. As of 11 June 2021, he is planning to appeal to the Supreme Court. according to Søgaard's lawyer.

== Personal life ==
From 1990 to 2000 Søgaard was married to the successful Swedish singer Carola Häggkvist. Together they have a son, Amadeus, born in 1998. He married for a second time in 2008 and has two sons in that marriage.
