= Carola Hits 2 =

Greatest hits album by Carola
- Released: 27 November 2008
- Recorded: 1983–1996
- Genre: Gospel, pop
- Label: BMG, Ariola
- Producer: Bag, Slick, Lasse Holm, Lennart Sjöholm, Boje, Lundberg, Maurice Gibb, Lasse Lindbom / Greg Walsh, Stephan Berg, Tore W Aas, Lasse Lindbom, Snowman

Carola chronology
Jul (1991)	Carola Hits 2 (2008)	Det bästa av Carola (1997)

Carola Hits 2 is a Greatest Hits album by Swedish singer Carola Häggkvist. It was released on 27 November 1996 in Sweden and Norway.

== Track listing ==
1. "Believe"
2. "Save Me"
3. "Just The Way You Are"
4. "Säg mig var du står" ("Why Tell Me Why")
5. "Hunger"
6. "Ännu en dag"
7. "Thunder and Lightning"
8. "Gjord av sten"
9. "Vilken värld det ska bli"
10. "Brand New Heart"
11. "Spread Your Wings (For Your Love)"
12. "Every Beat of My Heart"
13. "All the Reasons to Live"
14. "Save the Children"
15. "Oh Happy Day"
16. "Guld i dina ögon"
17. "Det kommer dagar"
18. "Mixade minnen"

== Release history ==
Country	Date
Norway	27 November 2008
Sweden	27 November 2008

== Charts ==
Peak (1996)	Peak position
Swedish Albums (Sverigetopplistan)	50
