= Jul i Betlehem =

Studio album by Carola Häggkvist
- Released: 10 November 1999 (Sweden)
- Recorded: Bethlehem, 15 June – 27 September 1999
- Genres: Christmas, gospel
- Labels: BMG, Rival
- Producer: Erik Hillestad

Carola Häggkvist chronology
Blott en dag (1998)	Jul i Betlehem (1999)	Sov på min arm (2001)

Jul i Betlehem (Swedish: "Christmas in Bethlehem") is the tenth studio album and second Christmas album by Swedish singer Carola Häggkvist., released on November 10, 1999. "Jul i Betlehem" was recorded in Bethlehem on 15 June - 27 September 1999, so it could be released for Christmas that year. On the album charts, the album peaked at number 1 in Sweden and number 6 in Norway.

== Track listing ==
1. O helga natt (Cantique de noël) - 4:20
2. O Betlehem, du lilla stad (O Little Town of Bethlehem) - 4:05
3. Himlen i min famn - 4.50
4. The Little Drummer Boy (feat. Blues) - 4.30
5. Nu tändas tusen juleljus - 3:00
6. En stjärna lyser så klar (En stjerne skinner i natt) - 3:50
7. Härlig är Jorden (Schönster Herr Jesu) - 4:02
8. I Wonder as I Wander - 3:20
9. Gläns över sjö och strand - 4:20
10. Mitt hjerte alltid vanker - 4:00
11. Mary's Boy Child - 3:40
12. Jag är så glad var julenatt - 4:20
13. Stilla natt (Stille Nacht, heilige Nacht) - 5:15
14. Dagen är kommen (Adeste Fideles) - 4:20

== Charts ==
Chart (1999)	Peak position
Norwegian Albums (VG-lista)	6
Swedish Albums (Sverigetopplistan)	1
