= Av längtan till dig =

Single by Åsa Jinder & CajsaStina Åkerström
- A-side: "Av längtan till dig"
- B-side: "Bröllopsdagen"
- Released: 2001
- Genre: folk
- Label: Virgin
- Songwriters: Janne Krantz; Åsa Jinder

"Av längtan till dig" is a song with music by Janne Krantz and lyrics by Åsa Jinder, and recorded by Åsa Jinder and CajsaStina Åkerström. It was released as a single in 2001. The song charted at Svensktoppen for a total of 25 weeks between 9 June before leaving the chart. It had spent 12 weeks at the top of the chart. The chart's successes made it the most successful Svensktoppen song of 2001, based on a point system.
