= Lucky Star (Johnson & Häggkvist song) =

Single by Carola Häggkvist & Andreas Johnson
- Released: 15 January 2008
- Recorded: 2007
- Genre: Pop
- Label: Warner Music

Carola Häggkvist & Andreas Johnson singles chronology
"I denna natt blir världen ny" (2007)	"Lucky Star" (2008)	"One Love" (2008)

"Lucky Star" is a song by Swedish singers Carola Häggkvist & Andreas Johnson. It was released as digital download on 15 January 2008 in Sweden. It reached number 13 on the Swedish Singles Chart

== Charts ==
Chart (2008)	Peak position
Sweden (Sverigetopplistan)	13

== Release history ==
Country	Date
Canada	15 January 2008
