= Credo (Carola Häggkvist album) =

Studio album by Carola
- Released: 31 May 2004
- Recorded: 2004
- Genre: Gospel
- Labels: Universal Music, Sonet
- Producer: Mikael Axelius

Carola chronology
Guld, platina & passion (2003)	Credo (2004)	18 bästa (2004)

Singles from Credo
- 1. "Ditt ord består" 2. "Åt alla"

Credo is the thirteenth studio album by Swedish singer Carola Häggkvist. It was released on May 31, 2004 in Sweden, Denmark, Finland and Norway. On the album charts, it peaked at number two in Sweden.

== Track listing ==
1. "Ditt ord består" (H. Nyberg)
2. "Åt alla" (John 1:12/P. Sandvall)
3. "Som en båt" (L. Axelsson)
4. "Gud jag behöver Dig" (P. Holmberg/D. Ejderfors)
5. "Du vet väl om att du är värdefull" (I. Olsson)
6. "Så älskade Gud hela världen" (John 3:16/T. Hagenfors)
7. "För att Du inte tog det gudomliga" (O. Hartman/B. Ring)
8. "Lova Gud o min själ" (A. Crouch/P. Sandvall)
9. "Herre, till Dig får jag komma" (C. Hultgren)
10. "Din trofasta kärlek" (E. McNeill/I-M. Eriksson)
11. "Jag vill ge dig o Herre min lovsång" (C. Hultgren)
12. "Namnet Jesus" (D. Welander /Zulu trad./J. Gustavsson)
13. "Låt mina fötter få gå" (U. Ringbäck)
14. "I frid vill jag lägga mig ner" (Psalm 4:9/S. Eriksson)

== Release history ==
Country	Date
Norway	31 May 2004
Sweden	2 June 2004
Finland	7 June 2004
Denmark	19 July 2004

== Charts ==
Chart (2004)	Peak position
Swedish Albums (Sverigetopplistan)	2
