= Åsa Jinder =

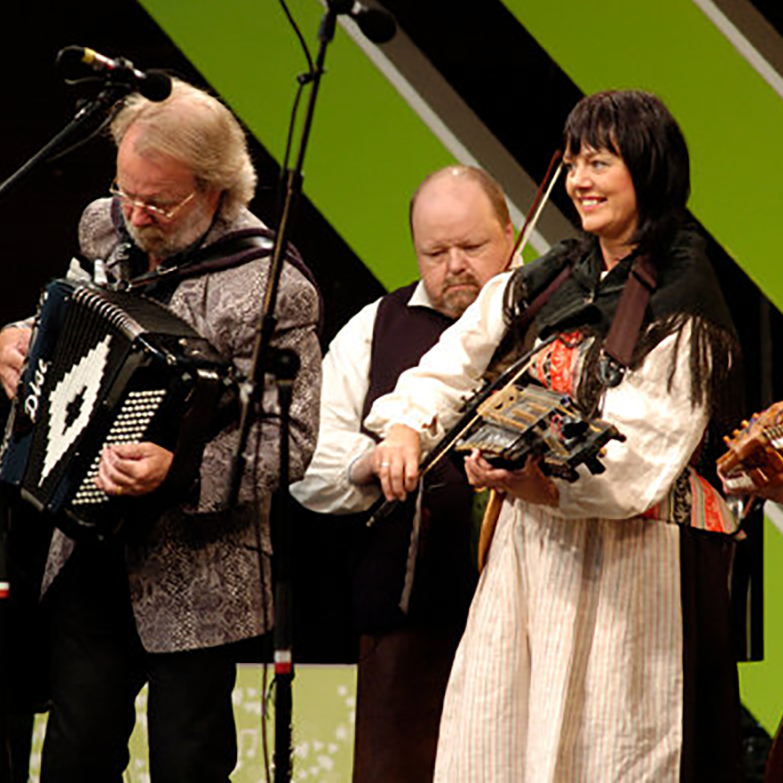
- Åsa Jinder

Background information
- Born: 9 October 1963 (age 62); Upplands Väsby, Sweden
- Genres: folk
- Occupations: Musician, composer, songwriter
- Instrument: Nyckelharpa

Åsa Tindra Jinder (born 9 October 1963) is a Swedish nyckelharpa player, composer, producer, songwriter, author and lecturer. She has scored album chart successes in Sweden.

She lives in Stockholm. 2006-2017 she lived in Acktjära outside Bollnäs, Hälsingland.

In 1979 she was the youngest person ever to be awarded the title of Riksspelman for National Folk Musician. In 1995 Jinder and vocalist Gunnhild Tvinnereim joined Norwegian/Irish instrumental duo Secret Garden as they won the Eurovision Song Contest with "Nocturne".

Her daughter Little Jinder is a singer.

== Discography ==
=== Albums ===
- Stilla jul

=== Songs ===
- Av längtan till dig
