= Nils Börge Gårdh =

- Born: 20 February 1946 (age 80); Stockholm, Sweden
- Genres: country, gospel/Christian
- Occupation: singer

Nils Börge Gårdh (born 20 February 1946) is a Swedish Christian singer and businessman. His major solo hit, Jag längtar bort, charted at the top 10-chart Svensktoppen for 10 weeks in 1982. He also works for the Hoppets stjärna charity organization.

== Discography ==
=== Albums ===
- 1975 – En sång om glädje
- 1976 – Kärleken från dej
- 1978 – En julhälsning från Nils-Börge Gårdh
- 1983 – I herrens händer
- 2001 – Jul, jul strålande jul

=== Singles ===
- 2006 – Barndomsåren/Där sången aldrig tystnar
