= Steg för steg =

Studio album by Carola Häggkvist
- Released: 12 April 1984
- Recorded: 1984
- Genre: Pop
- Label: Marianne Records
- Producers: Lasse Holm, Lennart Sjöholm

Carola Häggkvist chronology
Julefrid med Carola (1983)	Steg för steg (1984)	På egna ben (1984)

Alternative cover
- International Cover

Steg för steg is the second studio album by Swedish pop singer Carola Häggkvist, released on 12 April 1984. The album was produced by Lasse Holm and Lennart Sjöholm. On the album charts, the album peaked at number 1 in Sweden and number 2 in Norway.

== Scandinavian Track listing ==
1. Tommy tycker om mig
2. Jag har funnit mig själv
3. Det regnar i Stockholm
4. I am a Woman, I am
5. Som en fjäril
6. Radio Love
7. Steg för steg
8. Thunder and Lightning
9. Tokyo
10. Ännu en dag
11. I think I Like it
12. När festen tagit slut
13. 60's Medley

== International Track listing ==
1. Tommy Loves me
2. You're Still On My Mind
3. It's Raining In Stockholm
4. I am a Woman, I am
5. Butterfly
6. Radio Love
7. One By One
8. Thunder and lightning
9. Tokyo
10. Let There Be Love
11. I think I Like it
12. Morning Star
13. 60's Medley

== Release history ==
Country	Date
Europe	12 April 1984
Sweden	12 April 1984

== Charts ==
Chart (1984)	Peak position
Norway	2
Sweden	1
