= One Love (Johnson & Häggkvist song) =

2008 song by Carola Häggkvist & Andreas Johnson

Single by Carola Häggkvist & Andreas Johnson
- Released: 20 February 2008
- Recorded: 2007
- Genre: Pop
- Length: 3:07
- Label: Warner Music
- Songwriter(s): Carola Häggkvist, Andreas Johnson, Peter Kvint

Carola Häggkvist & Andreas Johnson singles chronology
"Lucky Star" (2008)	"One Love" (2008)

"One Love" is a song by Swedish singers Carola Häggkvist & Andreas Johnson. It was their Melodifestivalen 2008 entry, but failed in "Andra Chansen", the Second Chance round. The single reached number 11 on the Swedish Singles Chart.

== Release history ==
Country	Date	Format
Sweden	20 February 2008	Digital download
Denmark	5 March 2008	Digital download
Finland	5 March 2008	Digital download
Norway	5 March 2008	Digital download
Denmark	12 March 2008	Maxi single
Finland	12 March 2008	Maxi single
Norway	12 March 2008	Maxi single
Sweden	12 March 2008	Maxi single
