= Julefrid med Carola =

EP by Carola Häggkvist
- Released: 6 December 1983
- Genre: Christmas music

Julefrid med Carola is a Christmas EP from Swedish pop singer Carola Häggkvist. It was released on 6 December 1983.

== Track listing ==
=== Side A ===
1. Hej mitt vinterland
2. Nu tändas tusen juleljus
3. Härlig är jorden

=== Side B ===
1. Bjällerklang
2. Stilla natt
3. O helga natt

== Charts ==
Chart (1984)	Peak position
Norwegian Albums (VG-lista)	12

Chart (2023)	Peak position
Swedish Albums (Sverigetopplistan)	17
