= Aygün Beyler =

Azerbaijani singer and actress (1975–2024)

- Birth name: Aygün Aydin gizi Hümmatova
- Born: 22 August 1975; Baku, Azerbaijan SSR, USSR
- Died: 6 January 2024 (aged 48); Ankara, Turkey
- Genres: Pop, Mugham
- Occupations: Singer; actress
- Instrument: Vocals
- Spouse: Rasul Vilayat

Aygün Aydin gizi Hümmatova (Note: Azerbaijani: Aygün Aydın qızı Hümmətova) (22 August 1975 – 6 January 2024), known professionally as Aygün Beyler, (Note: Azerbaijani: Aygün Bəylər) was an Azerbaijani singer and actress.

== Early life and education ==
Aygün Hummetova (Beyler) was born on 22 August 1975 in Baku. The family had 6 children. She received her first musical education in the drum class at the music school of the Sattar Bahlulzade Palace of Culture.

== Career ==
The Azerbaijan State Children's Philharmonic, established in 1988, held a competition for talented children to join the Philharmonic, and 13-year-old Beyler was accepted into the Philharmonic. Her first appearance on the professional stage also coincided with this period. She adopted her stage name after her teacher Beyler Guliyev.

The first professional performances on large stages with the Philharmonic's children's musical groups, and tours to foreign countries, various cities and regions began from this time. Beyler has been a soloist of Azerbaijan Television and Radio since 1986. In 1987, she finished in first place in a competition among Soviet performers. She represented Azerbaijan in Sweden, Austria, Germany, Great Britain, the US and other countries. In 1995, she created the first professional musical group named after Shovkat Alakbarova and began extensive concert activity. Television, radio, major state events, and also consistently represented Azerbaijani musical art abroad. In 1998, Beyler entered the singing faculty of the Baku Academy of Music, opening a new page in her artistic career. She learned the intricacies of mugham from prominent artists such as Arif Babayev, Islam Rzayev, Aghakhan Abdullayev, Elkhan Muzaffarov, and Alim Gasimov.

In 2005, Beyler, who performed at the international folklore festival held in Samarkand, Uzbekistan, accompanied by a folk-mugham trio, successfully represented the Azerbaijani mugham school and was awarded the first prize and became the winner of the festival.

From this period, from 2005 to 2010, she performed in solo concerts as a regular participant in music festivals held in many countries around the world: France, Spain, Morocco, the US, England, Russia, Turkey, Greece, the Netherlands, Germany, South Korea, Sweden, Denmark, etc.

In 2012, Beyler entered the newly opened faculty of symphonic conducting and composition at the Baku Academy of Music. In 2013, she began broadcasting her author's program "Yene o bag olaydı" (It Could Be That Garden Again) in collaboration with ATV TV channel. In 2015, she mortgaged her house for the amount needed to organize a solo concert. The concert did not take place because the concert coincided with a fire at the Gunashli oil field on the day of the concert, and Beyler lost that amount. She herself attributed his illness to this event. In 2022, the Beyler was gifted a house by the head of state.

== Personal life and death ==
Beyler was married to her childhood friend, Rasul Vilayat. In 2009, she gave birth to her daughter.

Although news of Beyler death spread on 6 January 2024, the Ministry of Culture denied these reports. It was announced that her condition was serious and that she would be brought to Azerbaijan on a flight from Ankara at 22:50. A few hours later, the Ministry of Culture confirmed that Beyler had died of breast cancer in Ankara. Her body was brought to Baku on 7 January.

On 8 January, at 11:00, a farewell ceremony was held at the Sattar Bahlulzade Cultural Center in Əmircan. After the farewell ceremony, Beyler was buried in the Surakhani cemetery.

== Awards and honors ==
In 2002, Beyer was awarded the honorary title of Honored Artist of the Republic of Azerbaijan by the signature of President Heydar Aliyev.
