= Loa Falkman =

Swedish opera singer, actor and artist

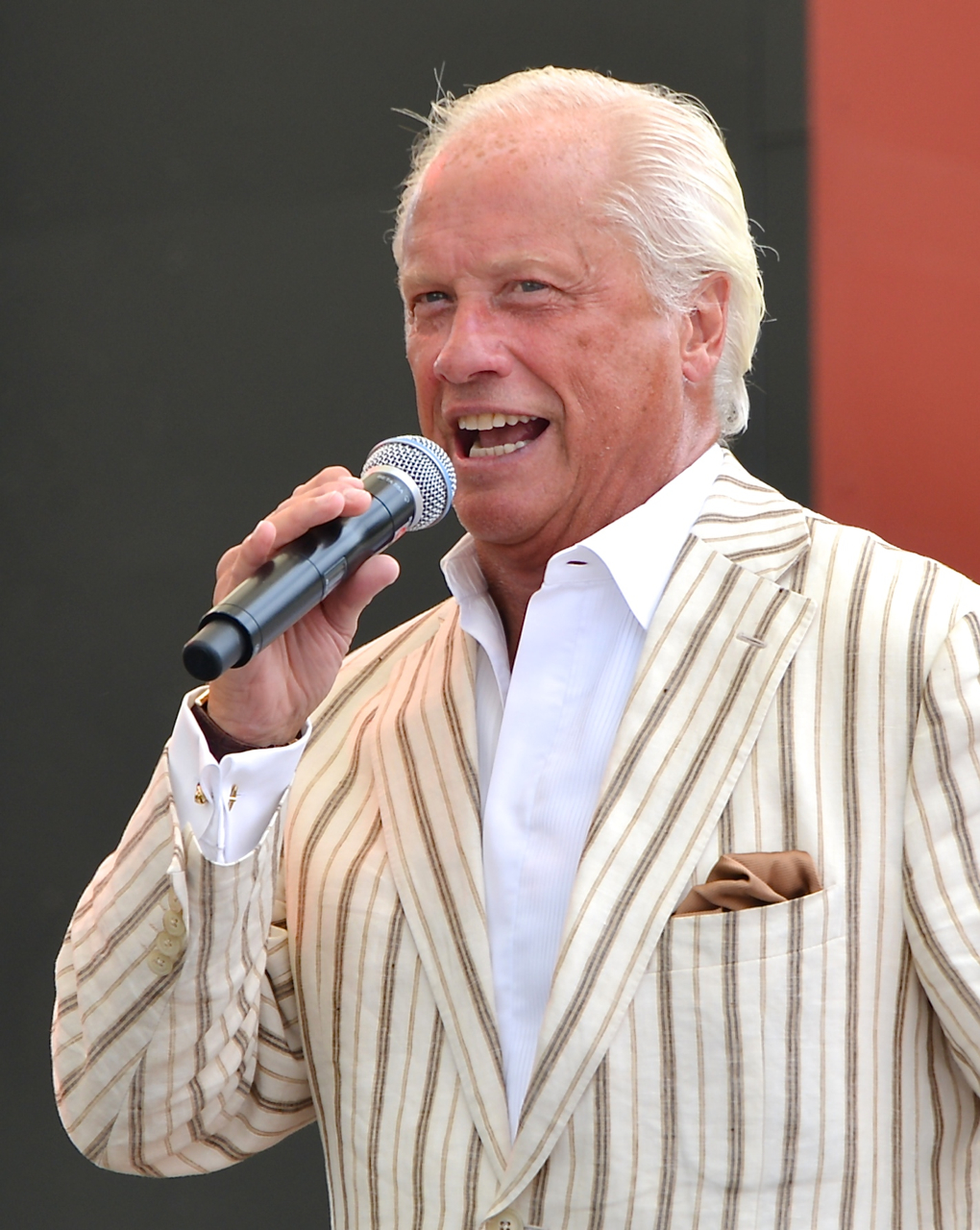
- Falkman in 2014
- Born: Carl Johan Falkman; 24 July 1947 (age 78); Stocksund, Stockholm County, Sweden
- Occupation: Singer
- Years active: 1973–present
- Spouse: Rosy Falkman (m. 1978)
- Awards: Hovsångare
- Musical career
- Genres: Opera
- Instrument: Vocals

Carl Johan "Loa" Falkman (born 24 July 1947) is a Swedish opera singer, actor and artist. He was appointed hovsångare by H.M. the King of Sweden in 2003.

After studying music, Falkman made his first major performance on the Royal Swedish Opera in 1973.

In Melodifestivalen 1990 (Swedish preselection contest for the Eurovision Song Contest), Falkman got the last place with his song "Symfonin" ("The Symphony"). He often plays pompous, vile characters like Wall-Enberg in Lilla Jönssonligan, Tillström in Newsmakers or Factory Owner Persson in Kronjuvelerna.

== Filmography ==
- 2011 – Kronjuvelerna
- 2009 – Newsmakers
- 2006 – Lilla Jönssonligan & stjärnkuppen
- 2006 – 7 miljonärer
- 2004 – ABBA: Our Last Video Ever
- 2004 – Lilla Jönssonligan på kollo
- 1999 – Dödsklockan
- 1997 – Lilla Jönssonligan på styva linan
- 1996 – Lilla Jönssonligan och cornflakeskuppen
- 1995 – Like It Never Was Before
- 1991 – T. Sventon och fallet Isabella
- 1986 – Bröderna Mozart
- 1984 – Åke och hans värld

TV series

- 2008 – Om ett hjärta
- 2007 – Ett gott parti
- 2006 – Nisse Hults historiska snedsteg
- 2005 – Kommissionen
- 2002 – Cleo
- 2002 – Talismanen
- 2001 – Fru Marianne
- 1996 – Percy Tårar
- 1991 – Facklorna

Voiceover

- 2004 – Kogänget
- 2002 – Ice Age

== Opera ==
- 2024 – Fanny and Alexander
- 2010 – Don Giovanni
- 1988 – Askungen
- 1985 – Maskeradbalen
- 1980 – Arresten på Bohus
- 1973 – Tintomara

== Discography ==
- Symfonin (1990)
- Julstämning (1990)
- Loa On Broadway (1995)
- Stockholmskantat (1999)
- Strangers In The Night (2001)
- Kom i min famn – Loa Falkman sjunger Evert Taube (2012)
- Jul (2013)
