= Från nu till evighet =

Studio album by Carola
- Released: 17 May 2006
- Recorded: 2006
- Genre: Pop
- Length: 44:54
- Labels: Universal Music, Sonet
- Producers: Peter Boström, Henrik Wikström, Thomas G:son, Twin, Koshiar Mehdipoor

Carola chronology
Störst av allt (2005)	Från nu till evighet (2006)	I denna natt blir världen ny (2007)

Från nu till evighet is the fifteenth studio album by Swedish singer Carola Häggkvist. It was released in May 2006 in Sweden and Norway. On the album charts, the album peaked at number one in Sweden, number 22 in Finland and number 25 in Norway.

== Track listing ==
1. "Jag ger allt" (S Almqvist / P Thyrén / K Marcello / Carola Häggkvist)
2. "Ingenting du säger" (S Almqvist / P Thyrén / K Marcello / Carola Häggkvist)
3. "Evighet" (Bobby Ljungren /Thomas G:son / H Wikström /Carola Häggkvist)
4. "Stanna eller gå" (Thomas G:son / Carola Häggkvist)
5. "Vem kan älska mig" (Thomas G:son / Carola Häggkvist)
6. "För alltid" (Bobby Ljungren /Thomas G:son / H Wikström)
7. "Fast det är mörkt nu" (S Almqvist / Carola Häggkvist)
8. "Tro på kärleken" (N Molinder / J Persson / P Ankarberg)
9. "Jag lever livet" (Thomas G:son / Carola Häggkvist)
10. "Nära dig" (Bobby Ljungren / Thomas G:son / Carola Häggkvist)
11. "Genom allt" (radioversion) (Carola Häggkvist)
12. "Invincible" (Bobby Ljungren / Thomas G:son / H Wikström)

== Singles ==
=== Evighet ===
01. Evighet
02. Evighet (instrumental)

- Sweden # 1
- Norway # 8

=== Invincible ===
01. Invincible
02. Invincible (instrumental)

- Sweden # 29
- Belgium # 6

== Release history ==
Country	Date
Finland	17 May 2006
Sweden	17 May 2006
Denmark	22 May 2006
Norway	22 May 2006

== Charts ==
=== Weekly charts ===
Chart (2006)	Peak position
Finnish Albums (Suomen virallinen lista)	22
Norwegian Albums (VG-lista)	25
Swedish Albums (Sverigetopplistan)	1

=== Year-end charts ===
Chart (2006)	Position
Swedish Albums (Sverigetopplistan)	34
