= Sov på min arm =

Studio album by Carola
- Released: 14 February 2001
- Recorded: 2007
- Genre: Gospel
- Label: Kirkelig Kulturverksted
- Producer: Erik Hillestad

Carola chronology
Jul i Betlehem (1999)	Sov på min arm (2001)	My Show (2001)

Sov på min arm is the eleventh studio album by the Swedish singer Carola Häggkvist. It was released on November 14, 2001 in Sweden, Norway, Denmark and Finland.

== Track listing ==
1. Byssan lull
2. Det gåtfulla folket B
3. Brahm's vaggvisa (Nu i ro slumra in)
4. Thula Sana
5. Jag vill alltid älska
6. Videvisan
7. Sov på min arm (Nocturne by Evert Taube)
8. Vi har en tulta med ögon blå
9. Majas visa
10. Ge mig handen, min vän
11. Jag lyfter ögat
12. Att komma hem (Som när ett barn)
13. Tänk att få vakna
14. Lyckeliten
15. Käre Gud, jag har det gott
16. Lasse litens medley
17. Jag sjunger godnatt
18. Gud som haver barnen kär
19. Du omsluter mig

== Release history ==
Country	Date
Denmark	14 February 2001
Finland	14 February 2001
Norway	14 February 2001
Sweden	14 February 2001

== Charts ==
Chart (2001)	Peak position
Norwegian Albums (VG-lista)	18
Swedish Albums (Sverigetopplistan)	1
