= Du vet väl om att du är värdefull? =

Song written by Ingemar Olsson

"Du vet väl om att du är värdefull"
- Hymn
- Language: Swedish
- Melody: by Ingemar Olsson

Du vet väl om att du är värdefull is a Christian song written and composed by Ingemar Olsson. Gothenburg trallpunk band Sten & Stalin paraphrased the song on the 2003 album Värdelös.

== Publication ==
- Number 18 in Cantarellen 1984
- Number 697 in Psalmer och Sånger 1987 under the lines "Tillsammans i världen".
- Number 620 in Segertoner 1988 under the lines "Tillsammans i världen".
- Number 791 in Verbums psalmbokstillägg 2003 under the lines "Tillsammans i världen".
