= I denna natt blir världen ny =

Single by Carola Häggkvist

from the album I denna natt blir världen ny - Jul i Betlehem II
- Released: 14 November 2007
- Recorded: 2007
- Genre: Gospel
- Length: 3:54
- Label: Universal Music
- Songwriters: Carola Häggkvist, Mikael Axelius, Peo Thyrén, Erik Hillestad
- Producer: Erik Hillestad

Carola Häggkvist singles chronology
"Stanna eller gå" (2006)	"I denna natt blir världen ny" (2007)	"Lucky star" (2008)

"I denna natt blir världen ny" is a song by the Swedish singer Carola Häggkvist. It was released on 14 November 2007 in Sweden, Norway, Denmark and Finland as the single from her sixteenth studio album, I denna natt blir världen ny – Jul i Betlehem II (2007), which was recorded in Betlehem in mid-2007.

== Release history ==
Country	Date
Denmark	14 November 2007
Finland	14 November 2007
Norway	14 November 2007
Sweden	14 November 2007

== Charts ==
Chart (2007)	Peak position
Sweden (Sverigetopplistan)	41
