= Fångad av en stormvind =

1991 song by Carola Häggkvist

Single by Carola

from the album Carola Hits
- Language: Swedish
- Released: 1991
- Genre: Synth-pop
- Length: 3:00
- Label: Rival; RCA; BMG Ariola
- Songwriter: Stephan Berg
- Producer: Stephan Berg

Carola singles chronology
"Every Beat of My Heart" (1990)	"Fångad av en stormvind" (1991)	"Stop Tellin' Me Lies" (1991)

Eurovision Song Contest 1991 entry
- Country: Sweden
- Artist: Carola
- Language: Swedish
- Composer: Stephan Berg
- Lyricist: Stephan Berg
- Conductor: Anders Berglund

Finals performance
- Final result: 1st
- Final points: 146

Entry chronology
- ◄ "Som en vind" (1990)
- "I morgon är en annan dag" (1992) ►

Official performance video
- "Fångad av en stormvind" on YouTube

"Fångad av en stormvind" (pronounced [ˈfɔ̂ŋːad ɑːv ɛn ˈstɔ̂rːmˌvɪnd]; lit. "Captured by a Storm Wind") is a song recorded by Swedish singer Carola, written and produced by Stephan Berg. It represented Sweden in the Eurovision Song Contest 1991 held in Rome, winning the contest, having previously won that year's Melodifestivalen.

"Fångad av en stormvind" peaked at number three on the Swedish Singles Chart and number six on the Norwegian Singles Chart, while its English-language version "Captured by a Lovestorm" charted in Austria, Belgium (Flanders) and The Netherlands.

== Background ==
=== Conception ===
"Fångad av en stormvind" was written and produced by Stephan Berg and recorded by Carola.

In addition to the original Swedish-language version, she also recorded an English-language version of the song, "Captured by a Lovestorm", with the lyrics written by Richard Hampton. The remix of both versions, called "Hurricane Remix", was done by Emil Hellman.

=== Eurovision ===
On 31 March 1991, "Fångad av en stormvind" performed by Carola competed in the 30th edition of the Melodifestivalen. It received 78 points - 32 points more than the runner-up song "Ett liv med dej" by Towe Jaarnek - winning the competition. As the festival was used by Sveriges Television (SVT) to select their song and performer for the 36th edition of the Eurovision Song Contest, the song became the Swedish entry, and Carola the performer, for Eurovision.

On 4 May 1991, the Eurovision Song Contest was held at Cinecittà studios in Rome hosted by Radiotelevisione italiana (RAI), and broadcast live throughout the continent. In her introductory video postcard, Carola sang Fiordaliso's "Non voglio mica la luna". She performed "Fångad av en stormvind" eighth on the night, following Luxembourg's "Un baiser volé" by Sarah Bray, and preceding France's "C'est le dernier qui a parlé qui a raison" by Amina. Anders Berglund conducted the event's orchestra in the performance of the Swedish entry.

At the close of voting, the song had received 146 points, the same number of points as the French entry. Both songs had received also the same number of twelve-point sets. However, Sweden was given the victory as it had received more ten-point votes than France, as that was the tie breaker procedure at the time. That rule had been introduced in order to avoid a split victory, as it had happened at the Eurovision Song Contest 1969. The 1991 contest was the first and the last time that procedure was used.

"Fångad av en stormvind" gave Sweden its third victory in the Eurovision Song Contest, following "Waterloo" by ABBA in 1974 and "Diggi-Loo Diggi-Ley" by Herreys in 1984. It was also the second time Carola represented Sweden, as she had taken part in the 1983 contest with the song "Främling", which had finished third. She once again represented Sweden in 2006 with the song "Invincible", placing fifth.

== Critical reception ==
Robbert Tilli from Music & Media wrote, "Very reminiscent of one-time winner Bucks Fizz, the song is a typical example of a happy and cheerful first-prize tune."

== Track listing ==
- 7-inch single (Swedish edition)
1. "Fångad av en stormvind" – 3:00
2. "Captured by a Lovestorm" – 3:00
- Maxi single (Swedish edition)
1. "Captured by a Lovestorm" – 3:00
2. "Fångad av en stormvind" – 3:00
3. "Captured by a Lovestorm (12-inch Hurricane Remix)" – 5:37
4. "Captured by a Lovestorm (7-inch Hurricane Remix)" – 3:03
- "Captured by a Lovestorm" 12-inch single (Swedish edition)

A1. "Captured by a Lovestorm (12-inch Hurricane Remix)" – 5:37
B1. "Captured by a Lovestorm" – 3:00
B2. "Captured by a Lovestorm (7-inch Hurricane Remix)" – 3:03

- "Captured by a Lovestorm" 7-inch single (European edition)

A1. "Captured by a Lovestorm" – 3:00
A2. "Fångad av en stormvind" – 3:00

- "Captured by a Lovestorm" (European edition)
1. "Captured by a Lovestorm" – 3:00
2. "Fångad av en stormvind" – 3:00
3. "Captured by a Lovestorm" – 3:00
4. "Captured by a Lovestorm (7-inch Hurricane Remix)" – 3:03

== Charts ==
=== Weekly charts ===
Chart (1991)	Peak position
Austria (Ö3 Austria Top 40)	22
Belgium (Ultratop 50 Flanders)	15
Europe (Eurochart Hot 100)	37
Finland (Suomen virallinen lista)	9
Israel (Israeli Singles Chart)	19
Netherlands (Dutch Top 40 Tipparade)	11
Netherlands (Single Top 100)	65
Norway (VG-lista)	6
Sweden (Sverigetopplistan)	3

=== Year-end charts ===
Chart (1991)	Position
Sweden (Topplistan)	24

== Certifications ==
Region	Certification	Certified units/sales
Sweden (GLF)	Gold	25,000^{^}
^{^} Shipments figures based on certification alone.

== Legacy ==
=== Cover versions ===
The Swedish heavy metal band Black Ingvars covered "Fångad av en stormvind" on their 1998 album Schlager Metal.

In 2000, demoscene artist "Auricom" covered "Fångad av en stormvind" and named it "Fångad av en korvring".

In 2005, Chilean urban singer DJ Méndez performed the song at the Alla tiders Melodifestival, a festival to celebrate the 50 years of Melodifestivalen. The song reached 9th place among 10 competitors.

Preceded by "Insieme: 1992" by Toto Cutugno	Eurovision Song Contest winners 1991	Succeeded by "Why Me?" by Linda Martin
