= My Show =

Studio album by Carola
- Released: 19 November 2001 (Europe)
- Recorded: 2001
- Genres: Pop, rock
- Labels: Universal Music, Sonet
- Producers: Patrik Frisk, Hitvision, Jay Jay, Niklas Molinder, David Eriksen, Robin Smith

Carola chronology
Sov på min arm (2001)	My Show (2001)	Guld, platina & passion (2003)

Singles from My Show
- 1. "The Light"; 2. "I Believe in Love"; 3. "You + Me"

My Show is the twelfth studio album by the Swedish singer Carola Häggkvist. It was released on 19 November 2001 in Sweden and Norway. On the album charts, the album peaked at number 6 in Sweden.

== Track listing ==
1. "My Show" (L Peirone / J Schella / A Barrén)
2. "The Light" (M Håkansson / P Engborg)
3. "I'm Coming Home" (Carola / H Andersson / M Ankelius)
4. "I Believe In Love" (Carola / H Andersson / M Ankelius / A-L Högdahl)
5. "The Pearl" (P Börjesson / K Johansson)
6. "My Love" (D French / J McKenzie)
7. "A Kiss Goodbye" (Carola / H Andersson / M Ankelius / A-L Högdahl)
8. "Secret Love" (J Henriksen / J Lysdahl)
9. "You + Me" (N Frisk / A Mattson)
10. "Wherever You Go" (Carola / P Frisk)
11. "Faith, Hope & Love" (Carola / D Eriksen)
12. "If I Told You" (Carola / J Poppo / M Deputato)
13. "Angel of Mercy" (B Gibb / R Gibb / M Gibb)
14. "Someday" (B Bacharach / Tonio K)

== Singles ==
=== The Light ===
1. "The Light" (Radio Edit)
2. "The Light" (Album Version)

=== I Believe In Love ===
1. "I Believe In Love" (Radio Hitvision Remix)
2. "I believe In Love" (Club Anthem Radio Mix)
- Sweden # 13 (1)

=== You + Me ===
1. "You + Me"

== Charts ==
Chart (2001–2002)	Peak position
Swedish Albums (Sverigetopplistan)	6
