= Elvis, Barbra & jag =

Studio album by Carola Häggkvist
- Released: 23 March 2011
- Recorded: 2011
- Label: X5 Music Group

Carola Häggkvist chronology
Christmas in Bethlehem (2009)	Elvis, Barbra & jag (2011)	Drömmen om julen (2016)

Elvis, Barbra & jag is the eighteenth studio album and first cover album by Swedish pop singer Carola Häggkvist, consisting of remakes of songs by Elvis Presley and Barbra Streisand. Carola interpreted the songs live on 3 July 2010 in Dalarna. The Swedish television station TV4 broadcast the event and it had a great success. A DVD of the live show reached the top of the DVDs Chart in Sweden, which encouraged her to record some of the songs she sang during the show in studio.

The album, crediting the performer as just Carola rather than the full name Carola Häggkvist, was released on 23 March 2011 on X5 Music Group and reached the top of the Swedish Albums Chart on the chart dated 22 April 2011.

== Track listing ==
1. Suspicious Minds (3:11)
2. In the Ghetto (3:34)
3. Enough is Enough (Enough is Enough - No More Tears) (3:19)
4. Woman in Love (4:50)
5. Always on My Mind (4:12)
6. You've Lost That Loving Feeling (4:12)
7. Evergreen (3:23)
8. Watch Closely Now (2:40)
9. Heartbreak Hotel (3:21)
10. Lead Me, Guide Me (2:55)
11. Guilty (4:08)
12. The Way We Were (3:04)

== Charts ==
Chart (2011)	Peak position
Swedish Albums (Sverigetopplistan)	1
