= Runaway (Carola Häggkvist album) =

Studio album by Carola Häggkvist
- Released: 12 May 1986
- Recorded: March to April 1986, Panther House, Miami Beach
- Genre: Pop
- Length: 37:45
- Label: Polydor/Universal
- Producer: Maurice Gibb

Carola Häggkvist chronology
Happy Days (1985)	Runaway (1986)	Much More (1990)

Singles from Runaway
- 1. "The Runaway"; 2. "Brand New Heart"; 3. "Spread Your Wings (For Your Love) (only 12" promo)"

Runaway is the fourth studio album by Swedish singer Carola Häggkvist, released on 12 May 1986 in Sweden and Norway. The album was produced by Maurice Gibb and written by him together with brothers Robin and Barry Gibb, also known as the Bee Gees. Robin and Maurice Gibb provided backing vocals on most of the songs. On the album charts, the album peaked at number two in Sweden and number nine in Norway.

The tracks "The Runaway" and "Brand New Heart" were recorded by Irish Eurovision group Luv Bug (who were competing in the 1986 Eurovision Song Contest at the time of the album's release). The latter was released as a single in early 1988.

== Track listing ==
All tracks composed by Robin Gibb and Maurice Gibb; except where indicated

1. "Radiate"
2. "The Runaway"
3. "Brand New Heart"
4. "Spread Your Wings (For Your Love)" (Barry Gibb, Robin Gibb, Maurice Gibb)
5. "Nature of the Beast"
6. "When Two Worlds Collide" (Barry Gibb, Robin Gibb, Maurice Gibb)
7. "(We Are) Atomic"
8. "Lost in the Crowd" (Barry Gibb, Robin Gibb, Maurice Gibb)
9. "So Far So Good" (Robin Gibb, Maurice Gibb, Rhett Lawrence)
10. "Everlasting Love" (Robin Gibb, Maurice Gibb, Rhett Lawrence, Carola Häggkvist)

== Personnel ==
- Carola Häggkvist - vocals
- Robin Gibb - vocals
- Maurice Gibb - vocals, keyboards, synthesizer
- Efva Nyström - vocals
- Ed Calle - horns
- Rhett Lawrence - keyboards, programming, arranger
- Dennis Hetzendorfer & Scott Glasel - engineer

== Charts ==
Chart (1986)	Peak position
Norwegian Albums (VG-lista)	9
Swedish Albums (Sverigetopplistan)	2

== Release history ==
Country	Date
Norway	12 May 1986
Sweden	12 May 1986
