= När löven faller =

Single by Carola Häggkvist

from the album Guld, platina & passion
- A-side: "När löven faller"
- Released: 2003 (Sweden, Norway)
- Genre: gospel, pop, schlager
- Length: 3:57
- Label: Universal Music
- Songwriters: Carola Häggkvist (lyrics), Ingemar Åberg (music)

Carola Häggkvist singles chronology
"You + Me" (2003)	"När löven faller" (2003)	"Walk a Mile in My Shoes" (2003)

"När löven faller" is a song written by Carola Häggkvist (lyrics) and Ingemar Åberg (composer). Carola Häggkvist applied for Melodifestivalen 2003 with the song, where it was first accepted. But when Carola Häggkvist said she didn't want to perform it on stage herself, the song was rejected since rules require the one singing at the demo recording to be prepared to perform the song at Melodifestivalen.

Instead, the song became a major Svensktoppen hit, entering the chart on 11 May 2003, reaching number eight. The song peaked at third place. On 9 November 2003, the song had been knocked out from Svensktoppen after 26 rounds.

Carola Häggkvist originally performed the song on 9 March 2003 during the Swedish TV-show Söndagsöppet.
