= Guld, platina & passion =

Compilation album by Carola
- Released: 24 May 2003
- Recorded: 1983–2003
- Genres: Pop, rock
- Labels: Universal Music, Sonet
- Producers: Pål Svenre, Lasse Holm, Lennart Sjöholm, Maurice Gibb, Stephan Berg, Anders Herrlin, Greg Walsh, Tore W Aas, Lasse Lindbom, Erik Hillestad, Patrik Frisk, Hitvision

Carola chronology
My Show (2001)	Guld, platina & passion (2003)	Credo (2004)

Singles from Guld, Platina & Passion
- 1. "Walk a mile of my shoes" 2. "När löven faller"

Guld, platina & passion is a compilation album by Swedish singer Carola Häggkvist. It was released in May 2003 in Sweden and Norway. On the album charts, the album peaked at number one in Sweden and number 5 in Norway. The album stayed on the album chart in Sweden for 67 weeks and sold 4× platinum.

== Track listing ==
1. När löven faller
2. Säg mig var du står
3. Främling
4. Mickey
5. Liv
6. Gloria
7. Tommy tycker om mig
8. Det regnar i Stockholm
9. Tokyo
10. Ännu en dag
11. På egna ben
12. Hunger
13. The Runaway
14. Brand New Heart
15. Radiate
16. Mitt i ett äventyr
17. All the Reasons to Live
18. If I Can Dream
19. Every Beat of My Heart
20. The Girl Who Had Everything
21. Fångad av en stormvind
22. Save the Children
23. My Tribute
24. Guld i dina ögon
25. Så länge jag lever
26. The Sound of Music
27. Modersvingen
28. Himlen i min famn
29. Thula Sana
30. Jag vill alltid älska
31. The Light
32. I Believe in Love (radio hitvision remix)
33. Walk a Mile in My Shoes

== Release history ==
Country	Date
Norway	24 May 2003
Sweden	24 May 2003

== Charts ==
Chart (2001–2002)	Peak position
Norwegian Albums (VG-lista)	5
Swedish Albums (Sverigetopplistan)	1
