= Ett liv med dej =

Single by Towe Jaarnek
- A-side: "Ett liv med dej"
- Released: 1991
- Genre: schlager
- Length: Big Bag
- Songwriters: Ingela 'Pling' Forsman, Bobby Ljunggren, Håkan Almqvist
- Producer: Lasse Holm

Towe Jaarnek singles chronology
"Ett liv med dej" (1991)	"Candles in the Rain/Promises" (1991)

"Ett liv med dej" is a power ballad written by Ingela 'Pling' Forsman, Bobby Ljunggren and Håkan Almqvist, and performed by Towe Jaarnek at Melodifestivalen 1991, where it finished second.

The single peaked at number 35 on the Swedish singles chart. The song also stayed at Svensktoppen for 10 weeks between 21 April-25 August 1991, peaking at number three.

== Charts ==
Chart (1991)	Peak position
Sweden (Sverigetopplistan)	36
