= Towe Jaarnek =

Swedish singer

- Born: 13 June 1965 (age 59)
- Genres: Schlager
- Occupation: Singer

Towe Jaarnek (born 13 June 1965) is a Swedish singer. At the Swedish Melodifestivalen 1991, she performed the song Ett liv med dej, which finished 2nd. In 1992, she recorded a duet with the Swedish singer Peter Jöback. The song was More Than a Game, which was the official song for the 1992 European Football Championship, which was played in Sweden. Her sister Carina Jaarnek (1962–2016) was also a singer.

== Discography ==
=== Studio albums ===
Title	Release
Towe	1992
Sound of Romance	2008

=== Singles ===
Title	Release
Ett liv med dej/This Time	1991
Candles in the Rain/Promises	1991
Fånga dagen (with Pernilla Wahlgren, Jim Jidhed, Tommy Nilsson and others)	1991
More than a Game (with Peter Jöback)	1992
Barcelona/Barcelona (Spanish-language version)	1992
Back Again	2002
I've Been Touched by You	2008

== Svensktoppen songs ==
Title	Entered hart/lef chart
Ett liv med dig	1991
I've Been Touched by You	2008
