= På egna ben =

Studio album by Carola Häggkvist
- Released: 28 November 1984
- Recorded: 1983
- Genre: Pop
- Label: Mariann Music
- Producers: Lasse Holm, Lennart Sjöholm

Carola Häggkvist chronology
Steg för steg (1984)	På egna ben (1984)	Happy Days (1985)

Singles from Carola... With Love
- 1. "Hunger"; 2. "Albatros"

På egna ben is the third studio album by Swedish singer Carola Häggkvist, released on November 28, 1984. The biggest hit from the album is the title track, which in fact is a Swedish cover version of an old Bryan Adams song. In Finland, the bonus track "Albatross" also was included. On the album charts, the albums peaked at number 5 in Sweden and number 10 in Norway.

== Swedish track listing ==
1. "På egna ben" (Swedish lyrics of "Can't Wait All Night")
2. "I en sommarnatt"
3. "Terpsichore"
4. "Kärlekens natt"
5. "Här är mitt liv"
6. "Hand i hand"
7. "Om du törs"
8. "Amore" (Swedish version of "Non voglio mica la luna")
9. "Så attraherad"
10. "Gjord av sten"
11. "Ge av dig själv"
12. "Du lever inom mig"

== European track listing as “Carola… With Love” ==
1. You're Still On My Mind
2. One By One
3. Life
4. Love Isn't Love
5. Let There Be Love
6. Radio Love
7. I Think I Like It
8. Tommy Loves Me
9. Albatros
10. Thunder and Lightning
11. Tokyo
12. Hunger
13. It's Raining in Stockholm

== Canadian track listing ==
1. Tommy Loves Me
2. I Think I Like It
3. Thunder And Lightning
4. Tokyo
5. Hunger
6. It's Raining in Stockholm
7. You're Still On My Mind
8. One By One
9. Life
10. Love Isn't Love
11. Let There Be Love
12. Radio Love

== Release history ==
Country	Date
Canada	28 November 1984
Europe	28 November 1984
Sweden	28 November 1984

== Chart positions ==
Chart (1984–1985)	Peak position
Norwegian Albums (VG-lista)	10
Swedish Albums (Sverigetopplistan)	5
