= Främling =

Studio album by Carola Häggkvist
- Released: 26 March 1983
- Recorded: 1983
- Genre: Pop
- Label: Mariann Grammofon
- Producer: Lasse Holm

Carola Häggkvist chronology
Främling (1983)	Julefrid med Carola (1983)

Singles from Främling
- 1. "Främling"

Främling (English: "Stranger") is the debut studio album by Swedish pop singer Carola Häggkvist, released on 26 March 1983. On the 1984 album charts, the album peaked at number one in Sweden and number two in Norway. It had sold over one million copies in Sweden, making it the best-selling album in the country.

== Track listing ==
1. "Främling" (Lasse Holm - Monica Forsberg)
2. "Säg mig var du står" ("Why, tell me why") (Martin Duiser, Gregory Elias, Pieter Souer, Ingela Forsman)
3. "Benjamin" (Duiser, Elias, Forsman)
4. "Gör det någonting" (Forsberg, Torgny Söderberg)
5. "Gloria" (Forsman, Giancarlo Bigazzi, Umberto Tozzi)
6. "You Bring Out the Best in Me" (Benjamin Findon, Michael Stanley Myers)
7. "Mickey" (Forsman, Nicky Chinn, Mike Chapman)
8. "Se på mig" (Forsman, Lasse Holm)
9. "Liv" (Forsman, Holm)
10. "Visa lite mänsklighet" ("A Little Tenderness") (Michael Leeson, Peter Vale, Liza Öhman)
11. "14 maj" ("4th of July") (Forsman, Anthony Cliff, Brian Wade)
12. "Du försvinner i natten" ("Paris Dies in the Morning") (Öhman, Andrew McCrorie-Shand)

== Charts ==
Chart (1984)	Peak position
Norwegian Albums (VG-lista)	2
Swedish Albums (Sverigetopplistan)	1
