= Störst av allt (album) =

Studio album by Carola
- Released: 25 April 2005
- Recorded: 2005
- Genre: Gospel
- Length: 68:26
- Labels: Universal Music, Sonet
- Producer: Erik Hillestad

Carola chronology
| 18 bästa (2004) | Störst av allt (2005) | Från nu till evighet (2006) |

Störst av allt is the fourteenth studio album by the Swedish singer Carola Häggkvist. On the album charts, the album peaked at number one in Sweden and number 16 in Norway.

== Track listing ==
1. "Störst av allt" (Erik Hillestad/Carola Häggkvist)
2. "Kärleksvals" (Ulrik Neumann/Håkan Elmquist)
3. "Tillägnan" (Lars Forssell/Monica Dominique)
4. "Barn och stjärnor" (Ylva Eggehorn/Hans Nyberg)
5. "Håll mitt hjärta" ("Same Old Story") (Björn Skifs/Lars-Göran Andersson/Peter Hallström)
6. "Allting har sin tid" (Börge Ring)
7. "Gammal fäbodpsalm" (Gunlis Österberg/Oskar Lindberg)
8. "Över älven" (Erik Hillestad/Carola Häggkvist)
9. "Måne och sol" (Britt G Hallqvist/Egil Hovland)
10. "Jag har hört om en stad ovan molnen" (Lydia Lithell/Russian)
11. "Allt kommer bli bra mamma" (Carola Häggkvist)
12. "Jag ger dig min morgon" ("I Give You the Morning") (Tom Paxton/Fred Åkerström)
13. "Den första gång jag såg dig" (Birger Sjöberg)
14. "Närmare Gud till dig" ("Nearer, My God, to Thee") (Sarah Fuller Adams/Emanuel Linderholm/Lowel Mason)
15. "Genom allt" (album version) (Carola Häggkvist)
16. "Genom allt" (radio version) (Carola Häggkvist)

== Singles ==
=== Genom allt ===
1. Genom allt (radio version)

== Release history ==
| Country | Date |
|---|---|
| Norway | 25 April 2005 |
| Sweden | 4 May 2005 |
| Denmark | 24 May 2005 |

== Charts ==
| Chart (2005) | Peak position |
|---|---|
| Norwegian Albums (VG-lista) | 16 |
| Swedish Albums (Sverigetopplistan) | 1 |
