= Invincible (Carola Häggkvist song) =

2006 song by Carola Häggkvist

Single by Carola Häggkvist

from the album Från nu till evighet
- Released: 23 March 2006 (Europe)
- Recorded: 2005
- Genre: Europop
- Length: 3:01
- Label: Universal Music
- Composers: Thomas G:son; Bobby Ljunggren; Henrik Wikström
- Lyricists: Thomas G:son; Carola Häggkvist

Carola singles chronology
"Genom allt" (2005)	"Invincible" (2006)	"Stanna eller gå" (2006)

Music video
- "Invincible" on YouTube

Alternative cover

Eurovision Song Contest 2006 entry
- Country: Sweden
- Artist: Carola Häggkvist
- As: Carola
- Language: English
- Composers: Thomas G:son; Bobby Ljunggren; Henrik Wikström
- Lyricists: Thomas G:son; Carola Häggkvist

Finals performance
- Semi-final result: 4th
- Semi-final points: 214
- Final result: 5th
- Final points: 170

Entry chronology
- ◄ "Las Vegas" (2005)
- "The Worrying Kind" (2007) ►

Official performance video
- "Invincible" (Semi-Final) on YouTube "Invincible" (Final) on YouTube

"Invincible" is a song recorded by Swedish singer Carola Häggkvist, released on March 23, 2006 by Universal Music as the English language version of the lead single "Evighet" from her fifteenth studio album, Från nu till evighet (2006). With music composed by Thomas G:son, Bobby Ljunggren, and Henrik Wikström and lyrics written by G:son and Häggkvist. It represented Sweden in the Eurovision Song Contest 2006, held in Athens, placing fifth.

The Swedish language version of the song, under the name "Evighet" ("Eternity") and performed by Carola, won the Melodifestivalen 2006. It scored second place by the judges, but was a runaway winner by public votes, therefore winning the festival.

== Background ==
=== Conception ===
"Invincible"/"Evighet" was composed by Thomas G:son, Bobby Ljunggren, and Henrik Wikström with lyrics by G:son and Häggkvist.

=== National selection ===
"Evighet" performed by Carola competed in the fourth heat of the 46th edition of Melodifestivalen which was held on 11 March 2006 at the Scandinavium indoor arena in Gothenburg. The song was the last of the eight competing entries to perform and directly qualified to the festival final as one of the two songs which received the most telephone votes. On 18 March, during the final held at the Globe Arena in Stockholm, Carola were the seventh of the ten competing acts to perform, and "Evighet" won the festival with 234 points, receiving the second highest number of votes from the regional juries and the highest number of public votes. As this Melodifestivalen was organised by Sveriges Television (SVT) to select its song and performer for the 51st edition of the Eurovision Song Contest, the song became the Swedish entrant, and Carola the performer, for Eurovision.

=== Eurovision ===
On 18 May 2006, the Eurovision Song Contest semi-final was held at the Nikos Galis Olympic Indoor Hall in Athens, hosted by the Hellenic Broadcasting Corporation (ERT), and broadcast live throughout the continent. Due to Sweden not placing in the top-10 in the previous year's contest –where it placed 19th– the song required to compete in the semi-final. Carola performed the song in English as "Invincible", the twentieth of the evening out of the twenty-three participants, and was subsequently announced at the end of the broadcast as one of the ten songs to have qualified for the final. The full breakdown of results published after the final revealed that in the semi-final it had finished in fourth place with 214 points, including receiving the maximum 12 points from Denmark, Malta, and Portugal.

On 20 May, Carola performed again "Invincible" in the grand final as the twenty-second song on stage, and subsequently finished in fifth place, receiving 170 points in total.

== Track listing and formats ==
International download edition

1. Invincible — 3:02
2. Invincible (SoundFactory Supreme Anthem)
3. Invincible (SoundFactory One Love Dub)
4. Invincible (SoundFactory Radio Edit)

International CD single

1. Invincible — 3:02
2. Invincible (Instrumental Version) — 2:59

Swedish CD single

1. Evighet — 3:01
2. Evighet (instrumental version) — 2:59

== Charts ==
In the singles chart, the Swedish-language version peaked at #1 in Sweden and #8 in Norway, and the English-language version peaked at #29 in Sweden.

The Swedish-language version also entered Svensktoppen on 30 April 2006 and reached 5th place, where it stayed for the two following weeks. After that it fell, being at Svensktoppen for five weeks in total. Nonetheless, the song became a huge hit in Scandinavia, and was performed at many of the Swedish top shows that year.

=== Weekly charts ===
"Invincible"

Chart (2006)	Peak position
Belgium (Singles Chart (Flanders))	56
Faroe Islands (Airplay Chart)	19
Sweden (Sverigetopplistan)	29
Turkey (Singles Chart)	33

"Evighet"

Chart (2006)	Peak position
Denmark (Tracklisten)	8
Norway (VG-lista)	8
Sweden (Sverigetopplistan)	1
Sweden (Svensktoppen)	5

== Legacy ==
A cover version by Tomas Andersson Wij in 2007 was in the Swedish Trackslistan. It has also been covered in afrikaans, as " 'n Ewigheid" by both Juanita du Plessis and Hi-5.

The BBC used an instrumental version of the song for their coverage of the 2006 European Athletics Championships, held in Gothenburg, Sweden.
