= Mitt i ett äventyr =

Single by Carola Häggkvist

from the album Much More
- A-side: "Mitt i ett äventyr"
- B-side: "Vilken värld det ska bli"
- Released: 1990
- Genre: pop, schlager
- Length: 3:06
- Label: Mariann Grammofon
- Songwriter: Stephan Berg

Carola Häggkvist singles chronology
"Gospel Train / Vilken värld det ska bli" (1986)	"Mitt i ett äventyr" (1990)	"The Girl Who Had Everything/One More Chance" (1990)

"Mitt i ett äventyr" is a song written by Stephan Berg, and performed by Carola Häggkvist at Melodifestivalen 1990, where the song ended up second, 15 points after Edin-Ådahl with "Som en vind". During Carola Häggkvist's the Nacka transmitter was knocked out. Urban rumors told about sabotage, since Carola Häggkvist had joined Christian denomination Livets ord.

The single peaked at number five on the Swedish Singles Chart. The song stayed at Svensktoppen for 10 weeks during the period of 21 April-25 August 1990, peaking at number three.

The song also entered Trackslistan.

In 1990, the song was also recorded by Curt Haagers for the album "Curt Haagers 10".

== Charts ==
Chart (1990)	Peak position
Sweden (Sverigetopplistan)	5
