= När det lider mot jul =

Song
- Language: Swedish
- Written: 1909
- Genre: Christmas
- Composer: Ruben Liljefors
- Lyricist: Jeanna Oterdahl

"När det lider mot jul", also known as "Det strålar en stjärna", is a Swedish Christmas song with lyrics by Jeanna Oterdahl, and written for vocals and piano in 1909 (opus 19) by Ruben Liljefors. A version for mixed choir, a cappella, was added in 1933 and originally published in 1944 by Gehrmans musikförlag. The song’s later popularity is said to have been affected by publication in Gottfrid Berg’s Läroverkskören 1950 and after being recorded on record, it was heard in TV in the early 1960s.

== Recordings ==
The song has been recorded by several Swedish choirs, including KFUM:s kammarkör, Kammarkören Pro Musica, Orphei Drängar, Göteborgs Gosskör, among others, as well as by solo artists and groups/bands, like Agnetha Fältskog, Loa Falkman, Anni-Frid Lyngstad, Carola Häggkvist, Pernilla Wahlgren, Thorleifs and Vikingarna. E.M.D. recorded the song on the 2009 Christmas album Välkommen hem.

== Publisher ==
- När det lider mot jul och andra barnvisor, 1955
- Julens önskesångbok, 1997, under the lines "Lucia".
- Barnens svenska sångbok, 1999, under the lines "Året runt".
