= Edvard Evers =

Swedish priest and hymnwriter (1853–1919)

- Born: 12 May 1853; Uddevalla, Sweden
- Died: 22 October 1919 (aged 66); Stockholm, Sweden

Edvard Evers (12 May 1853 – 22 October 1919) was a Swedish Lutheran priest and hymnwriter. Edvard Evers is mostly famous for writing the lyrics of the Christmas carole Jul, jul, strålande jul. The song was composed by Gustaf Nordqvist and was first published in 1921.

Edvard Evers was born at Uddevalla in Västra Götaland, Sweden. He was the son of Per Emil Evers and Mathilda (Nordström) Evers. Evers studied at Lund University and graduated in theology in 1878. He was ordained a parish priest in the Diocese of Strängnäs during 1879. Evers subsequently served as a priest in Stockholm where he became curate of Adolf Fredrik Church (Adolf Fredriks kyrka) in 1884. Edvard Evers was appointed vicar at Norrköping in Östergötland during 1892. He subsequently worked within the Norrköping school system serving as an inspector of the girl’s high school (1895 to 1906) and was elected chairman of the Norrköping public school board in 1910. Evers died during 1919 in Stockholm, Sweden.
