= Jeanna Oterdahl =

Swedish educator, author and poet

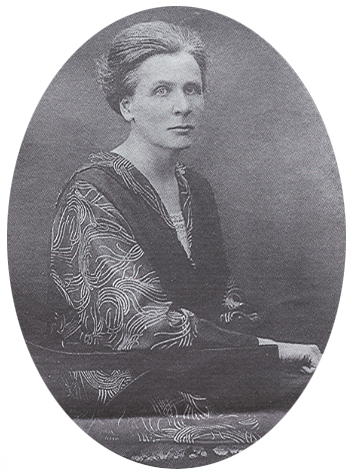
- Jeanna Oterdahl in 1918
- Born: 9 August 1879; Uddevalla, Sweden
- Died: 25 July 1965 (aged 85)
- Occupations: Writer, educator, song lyricist
- Writing career
- Language: Swedish
- Years active: Twentieth century
- Notable awards: Nils Holgersson Plaque

Jeanna Louise Oterdahl (9 August 1879, in Uddevalla, Sweden – 25 July 1965) was a Swedish educator, author and poet.

She was educated at the Högre lärarinneseminariet in Stockholm.
