= Jul, jul, strålande jul =

Song
- Language: Swedish
- Published: 1921
- Genre: Christmas
- Songwriter: Edvard Evers
- Composer: Gustaf Nordqvist

"Jul, jul, strålande jul" is a Christmas song with lyrics written by Edvard Evers and music composed by Gustaf Nordqvist. It was published in 1921.

The song has been subject to many interpretations in Sweden, other Scandinavian countries and internationally.

It was first published by music publisher Abraham Lundquist AB. The song was one of the most common Christmas carols in Sweden during the 20th century. The lyrics describe Christmas as white, then snow-filled, and depict other Christmas blessings with a wish that Christmas brings light and peace. The first known recording of the song dates back to 1924 (in Swedish) with Strandbergs kvartett, as the B-side of the single "Hosianna".

"Jul, jul, strålande jul" (English: Christmas, Christmas, Glorious Christmas) was composed both for solo voice or voices in unison with accompaniment (organ or piano), and for choir a cappella.

== Recordings ==
Well-known recordings of the song include The Real Group, Cyndee Peters, Tommy Körberg, Göteborgs Gosskör, Linköpings Studentsångare, Orphei Drängar, Stockholms Studentsångare, Anki Bagger, Sofia Karlsson, Sissel Kyrkjebø, Carola Häggkvist, Jan Malmsjö, Göran Lindberg and Thorleifs. In 2008 the song was recorded by Amy Diamond on her album En helt ny jul. In 2009, E.M.D. interpreted it on their album Välkommen hem, and Sissel & Odd did so as well on their album Strålande jul. In 2010 Sanna, Shirley, Sonja on their album Vår jul. In 2012, Sanna Nielsen recorded the song for her album Vinternatten.

A recording by Christer Sjögren entered the Swedish Singles Chart on December 14, 2002 and reached #7. Peter Jöback sang it in his 2002 album Jag kommer hem igen till jul. His version topped at #48 in 2003 on the Swedish charts. Carola Häggkvist's version charted in 2013 and in subsequent years during the Christmas seasons on the Swedish Singles Chart, topping out at #29 in 2018.

An English interpretation with the title "Wonderful Peace" was made by Norman Luboff. A German version was published on Youtube, with German text and arrangement by Maybebop's Oliver Gies.
