= Gustaf Nordqvist =

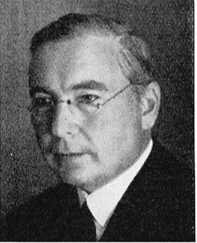
- Swedish composer, church musician and professor

Background information
- Born: 12 February 1886; Stockholm, Sweden
- Died: 28 January 1949 (aged 62) Stockholm, Sweden
- Occupations: composer, church musician, professor
- Instruments: Piano, Organ

Gustaf Nordqvist (12 February 1886 – 28 January 1949) was a Swedish composer, organist, and music educator.

== Life and career ==
Gustaf Lazarus Nordqvist was born on 12 February 1886 in Stockholm, Sweden. He studied at the Royal College of Music, Stockholm from 1901 through 1910 focusing on organ, piano, and music composition. In 1913 he pursued further studies in Berlin with Arthur Willner.

In 1914 Nordqvist returned to Stockholm where he was appointed organist at Adolf Fredrik Church. He remained in that post until his death 35 years later. In 1924 he joined the staff of the Royal College of Music, Stockholm where he taught harmony. He was made a professor at that school in 1944 and continued to work in that position until his death in 1949. He concurrently worked as the principal organ teacher at Karl Wohlfart's highly regarded music school in Stockholm from 1926 through 1949.

Gustaf Nordqvist died in Stockholm on 28 January 1949. As a composer he is best known for his many solo songs, including ‘Till havs’ and Christmas song Jul, jul, strålande jul. In later years, his works drifted increasingly towards the sacred. Gustaf Nordqvist was voted into the Royal Swedish Academy of Music in 1932.
