= Nu tändas tusen juleljus =

Christmas song written and composed by Emmy Köhler

- Hymn
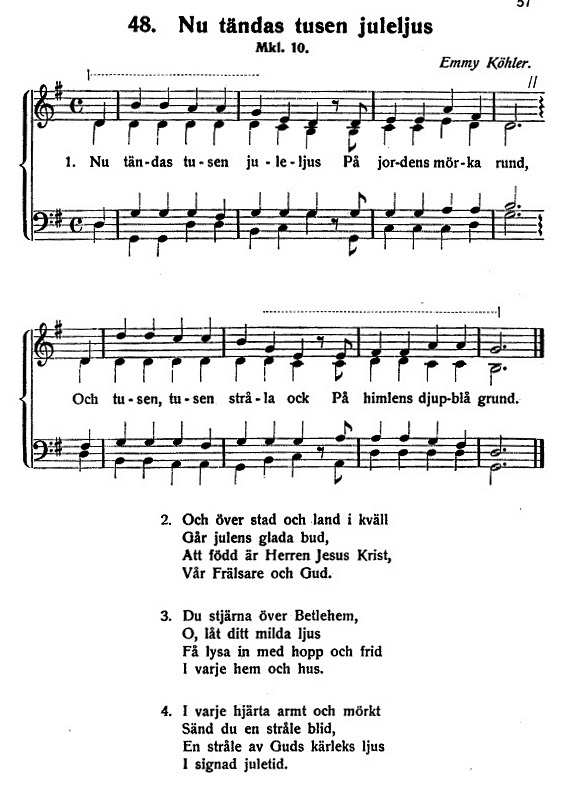
- English: Now are lit a thousand Christmas candles
- Genre: Christmas carol
- Occasion: Christmas
- Text: by Emmy Köhler
- Language: Swedish
- Melody: by Emmy Köhler
- Composed: 1898

"Nu tändas tusen juleljus" is a Christian traditional Swedish language Christmas song, written in 1898 by the Swedish song text writer Emmy Köhler (both text and melody). Translated into English, the title literally means "Now are lit a thousand Christmas candles". The theme of the song is the gospel of the newborn Christ and specifically its aspects of domestic harmony and inner peace, brought by the lights of candles as well as of the stars above, most importantly the star of Bethlehem. It was one of the most popular Christmas songs in Sweden during the 20th century, in churches, homes and schools. Swedish pop singer Agnetha Fältskog recorded the song on her album "Nu tändas tusen juleljus", named after the song, with her daughter Linda Ulvaeus.

The song was also covered by artists and groups like Evie (both 1974 and 1976, also in English), Carola Häggkvist (1983), Wizex (1993), and Lill Lindfors (1991). Swedish punk band Ebba Grön, who recorded the song in 1980, altered the lyrics and called the song "Nu släckas tusen människoliv" ("Now a thousand of human lives are put out"). This version is about homelessness.

The Norwegian language version is Nå tennes tusen julelys and has been recorded by artists such as Elisabeth Andreassen and Sissel Kyrkjebø. There is also a Spanish language version called "Mil Luces" that appeared on an album entitled "Felicidad en Navidad" by an unknown artist, which was distributed by Fuente de Vida.

== Titles in other languages ==
- Finnish language: Nyt syttyy valot tuhannet (also Nyt sytytämme kynttilän)
- Danish language: Nu tændes tusind julelys
- Faroese language: Nú tendrast túsund jólaljós
- Icelandic language: Við kveikjum einu kerti á
- Norwegian language: Nå tennes tusen julelys
- Swedish language: Nu tändas tusen juleljus
- Indonesian language: Seribu Lilin
- Different melody: Russian language version, V lesu rodilas elochka

The Russian language version, В лесу родилась ёлочка (A Spruce Was Born in the Forest), is commonly claimed to have been written based on this song in 1903 and set to music in 1905 by the amateur composer Leonid Karlovich Beckmann. The tune of the song is only slightly different than the Nordic language ones.

== See also ==
- Jul i Betlehem
