= Gläns över sjö och strand =

Swedish Christmas poem and song

- Hymn
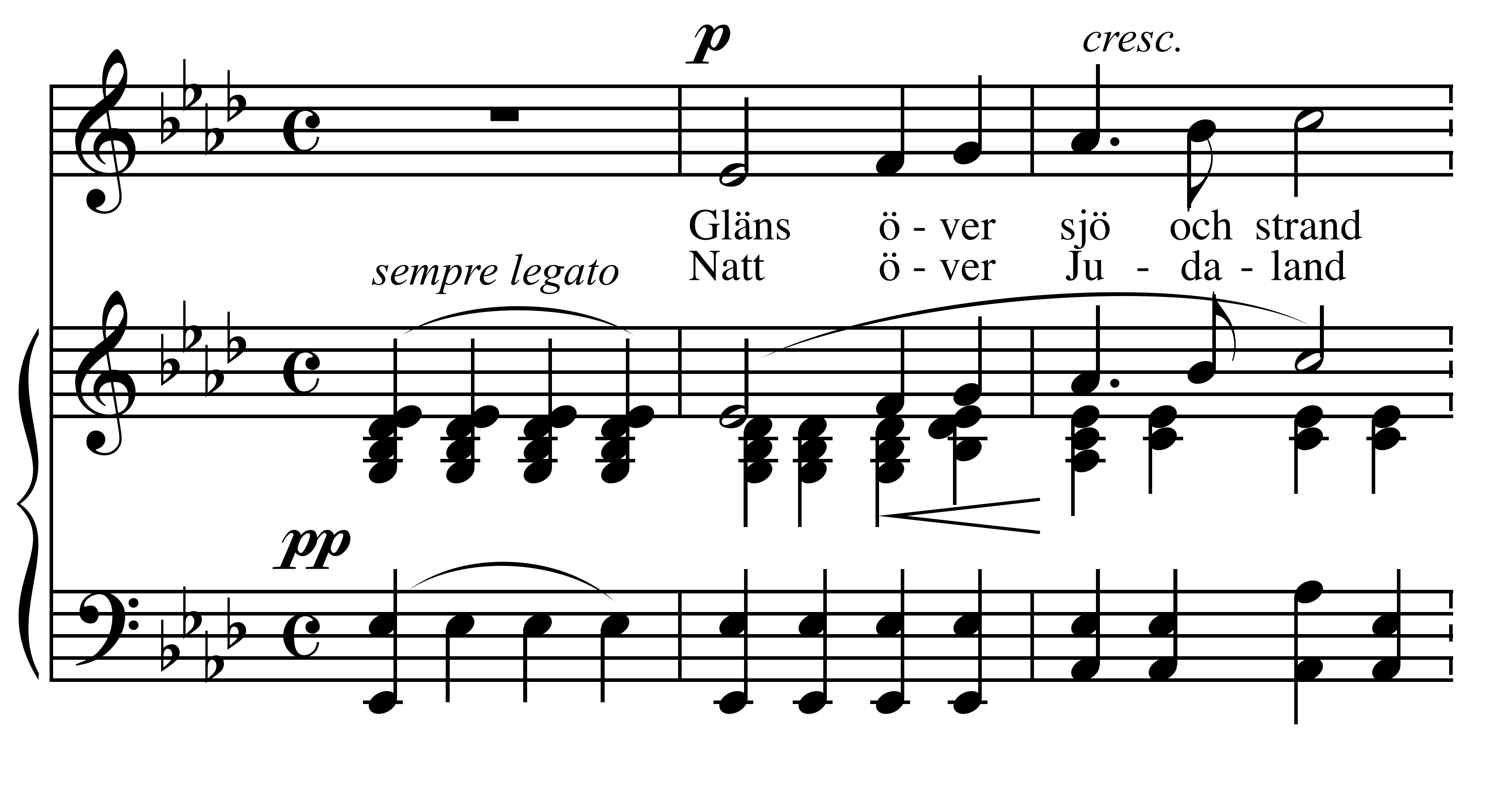
- English: Shine over sea and shore
- Occasion: Christmas
- Text: by Viktor Rydberg
- Language: Swedish
- Melody: by Alice Tegnér
- Published: 1891 (as a poem); 1893 (as a song)

"Gläns över sjö och strand" ("Shine over sea and shore") is the opening line for a poem written by Viktor Rydberg, appearing in the 1891 Vapensmeden (The gunsmith). In the novel, the poem has no title. The title "Betlehems stjärna" ("Star of Bethlehem") originally appeared in 1893 when Alice Tegnér published music, turning the poem into a song. The title has also been used for later melodies.

A popular hymn, it is featured in Den svenska psalmboken (The Swedish hymnal).
