= Carola Häggkvist =

Swedish singer (born 1966)

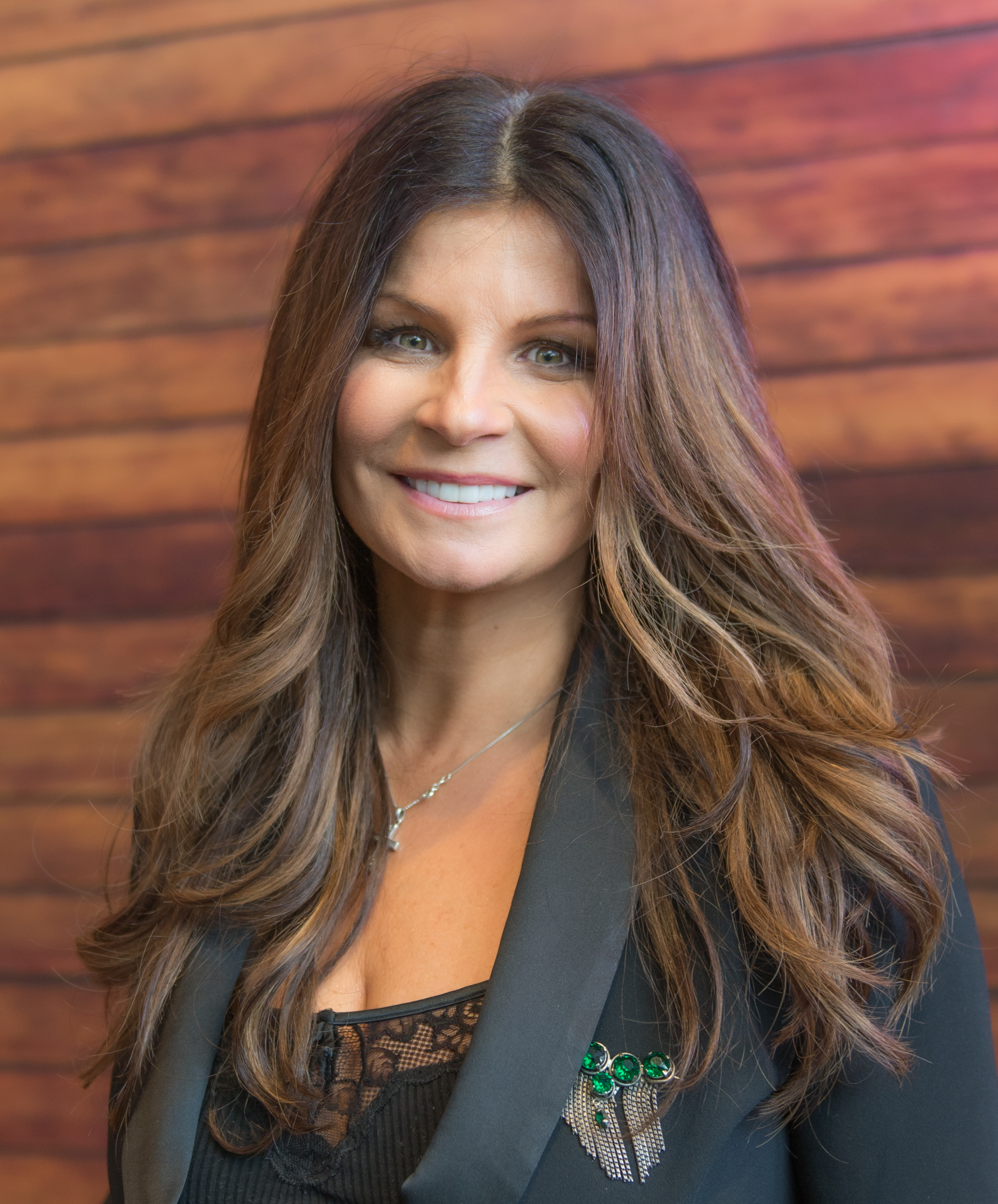
- Carola Häggkvist in June 2015

Background information
- Also known as: Carola; Carola Søgaard
- Born: Carola Maria Häggkvist; 8 September 1966 (age 60); Stockholm, Sweden
- Genres: Pop; gospel; schlager
- Occupation: Singer
- Instrument: Vocals
- Years active: 1983–present
- Label: Sonet
- Spouse: Runar Søgaard (m. 1990; div. 2000)
- Website: www.carola.com

Carola Maria Häggkvist (Swedish: [kaˈrôːla ˈhɛ̂ɡːkvɪst]; born 8 September 1966), best known mononymously as Carola, is a Swedish singer. She has been among Sweden's most popular performers since the early 1980s and has released albums ranging from pop and disco to hymns and folk music. Her debut album, Främling (1983), sold around one million copies and remains the biggest-selling album in Swedish music history. During her career, she has recorded many top-selling albums and singles and is referred to as Sweden's most prominent female singer. Some of her biggest hits are "Främling", "Tommy tycker om mig", "Fångad av en stormvind", "All the Reasons to Live", "I Believe in Love", "Genom allt", and "Evighet". Besides Swedish, she has also released records in Dutch, German, English, Norwegian and Japanese.

Häggkvist has represented Sweden at the Eurovision Song Contest on three occasions: in 1983, finishing third; in 1991, winning the contest; and in 2006, finishing fifth.

== Early life ==
Carola Maria Häggkvist was born on 8 September 1966 at Södersjukhuset in Stockholm. She grew up in Norsborg, south of the Swedish capital. At the age of eight, she began to perform at Stockholm's Miniteatern; she also attended Adolf Fredrik's Music School. In 1977, Häggkvist won a talent competition and appeared on television for the first time, on Sveriges magasin, performing "Krokodilbarnets klagan".

== Career ==
=== 1981–1989: Early career and Främling ===
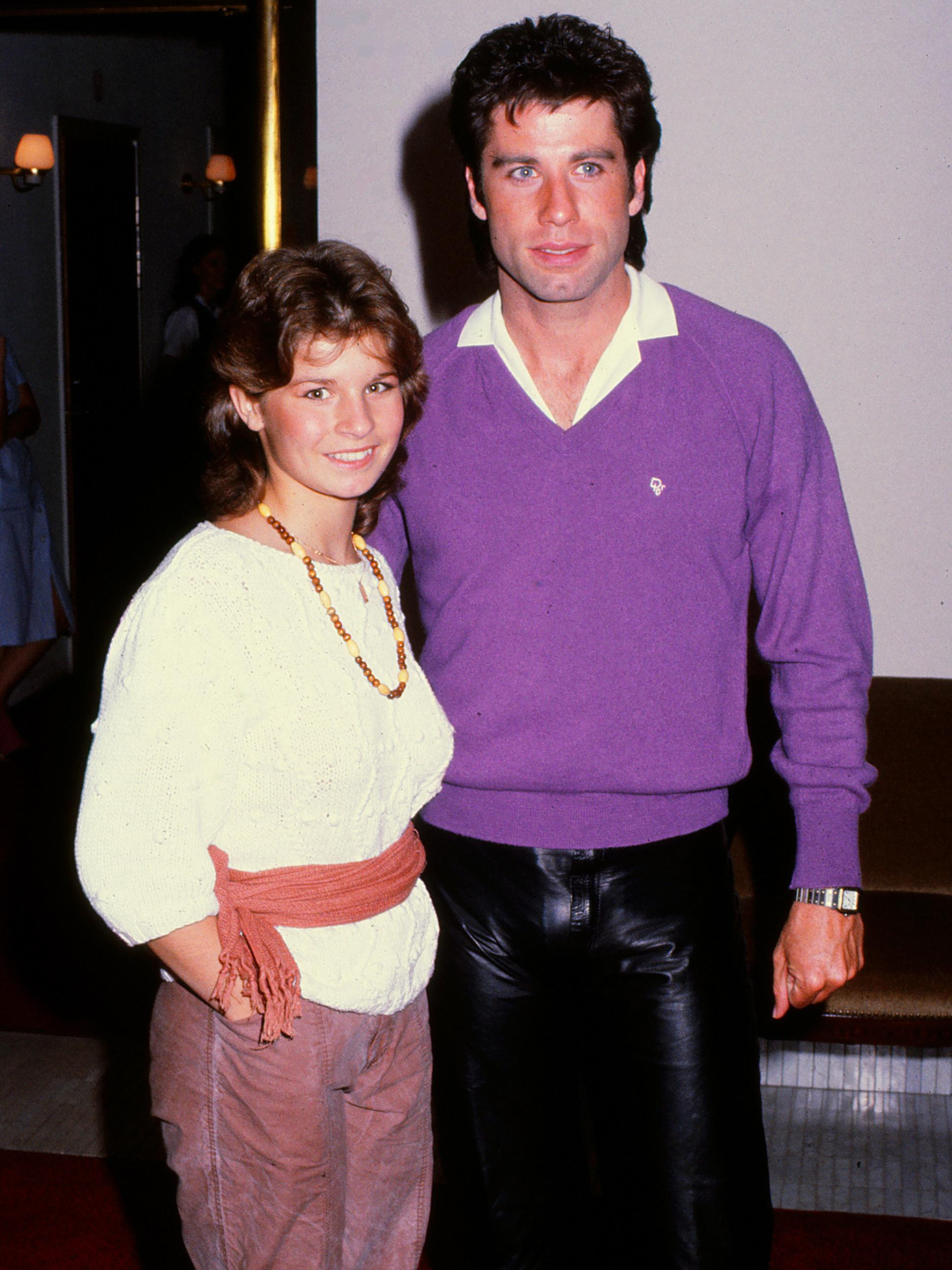
Carola and John Travolta in 1983

In 1981, Swedish music promoter Bert Karlsson met then 15-year-old Häggkvist after she performed on the television series Hylands hörna and offered her the chance to take part in Melodifestivalen, the Swedish selection for the Eurovision Song Contest in 1982. She turned down the offer. Songwriter Lasse Holm offered Häggkvist two of his songs for Melodifestivalen 1983, "Mona Lisa" and "Främling". "Främling" was chosen, and with it Häggkvist won the right to represent Sweden at that year's Eurovision Song Contest in Munich. The song scored eight points, the highest possible mark, from all eleven regional juries. Häggkvist represented Sweden at the Eurovision Song Contest on 23 April. She finished third in front of 6.1 million Swedish television viewers, 84% of the country's population. This is still a record in Sweden.

"Främling" became the title track to Häggkvist's debut album, which sold over one million copies, making it the biggest-selling album in Swedish history. After Eurovision, Häggkvist embarked on a tour of European television programmes, promoting "Främling" and performing in it several languages: in English as "Love Isn't Love", in German as "Fremder", and in Dutch as "Je ogen hebben geen geheimen". The album contained hits like "Mickey", "Liv", "Gloria" and "Tokyo". In December 1983, she released her first Christmas album, Julefrid med Carola, which sold 200,000 copies. In 1984, Häggkvist released two top-selling pop/rock albums that together sold over 1 million copies. "Tommy tycker om mig" became a huge hit in Sweden, together with "Hunger". She later travelled to Japan and recorded a single in Japanese. In 1985, the Bee Gees collaborated with her on the album Runaway, which was written by the Gibb brothers and produced by Maurice Gibb. The record sold double platinum when released in Sweden the following year. "The Runaway", "Brand New Heart", "Spread your wings" and "Radiate" became massive hits in Scandinavia. In 1987, Häggkvist embarked on a church tour with pianist Per-Erik Hallin. After this followed a career hiatus for the singer.

=== 1990–1991: New image, independence, and Eurovision victory ===
In 1990, she returned to Melodifestivalen, with "Mitt i ett äventyr" ("In the middle of an adventure"). The song finished second in the festival, failing to earn Häggkvist the right to represent Sweden at Eurovision. Edin-Ådahl won the event. Her comeback album, titled Much More, was released, earning a gold certificate in Sweden. However, Häggkvist and songwriter Stephan Berg had already begun planning another attempt at Eurovision.

In 1991, she returned to Melodifestivalen with "Fångad av en stormvind" ("Captured by a lovestorm"). The song won the festival by thirty-two points and became the Swedish entry for the Eurovision Song Contest in Rome. British bookmakers considered Häggkvist second favourite to win the contest. On the night of the contest, with one voting jury left to announce their scores, three countries remained in contention to win the contest: Sweden, with 146 points; Israel, with 139; and France, with 134. Neither Israel nor Sweden won any points from the Italian jury, but France won twelve, leaving Sweden and France tied for first place with 146 at the conclusion of the voting. Sweden won the contest after a countback, having received five ten-point scores during the voting versus France's two. "Fångad av en stormvind" became a huge hit in Europe, and was followed by a compilation album, Hits, and a Christmas album, Jul. After her victory, she released an international version of "Much More" and went on an extended promotional tour throughout Europe. Her album produced several hits, among them "I'll live" and "All the Reasons to Live".

=== 1992–2004: Albums, tours, and musicals ===
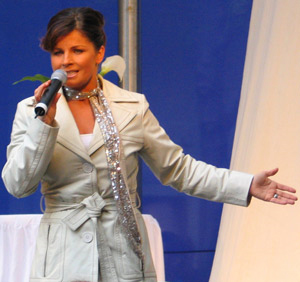
Carola in concert, 2005

Häggkvist was the first Scandinavian pop artist to perform in China—in front of an estimated 600 million television viewers; she also released an album in China in 1992. In 1992 and 1993, Rival International, released Carola's earlier albums on CD. She was originally signed to Mariann Records in Scandinavia.

In 1993, ten years after her breakthrough representing Sweden at the 1983 Eurovision Song Contest, she recorded a gospel album, My Tribute, which was released in sixteen countries, making her gospel artist of the year in the Netherlands in 1994. The album contains the hit-single "My Tribute", one of Häggkvist's best-known songs. In 1994, Häggkvist released a rock-themed album, '"Personligt" (Personally), marking her debut as a songwriter and selling gold. "Så länge jag lever", "Sanna Vänner" and "Guld i dina ögon" became hits and received a great amount of radio airplay.

In 1995, Häggkvist made her debut as a musical actress, playing Maria in The Sound of Music opposite Tommy Körberg as the male lead. She played the role in 325 performances and won the prestigious Guldmasken (Golden Mask) award. Three years later, she sang the theme song in the Norwegian musical Sophie's World, which was released on the album Songs from Sophie's World. Also in 1998, Häggkvist played the voice of Mirjam in the Swedish version of The Prince of Egypt. In 2002, she made a short appearance as Fantine in Les Misérables in London and five Scandinavian cities.

In November 1997, Häggkvist released another compilation album, De bästa av Carola ("The Best of Carola"), and with it several new singles like "Dreamer". Following this came an album of tracks penned by Lina Sandell, Blott en dag ("Just One Day"). The album received excellent reviews and revealed Carola's passion for hymns. In 1999, another Christmas album was released: Jul i Betlehem ("Christmas in Bethlehem"). The album sold 600,000 units throughout Scandinavia, including 350,000 in Sweden. and became the biggest-selling album of 1999. She also co-wrote the ballad "Himlen i min famn", which remains a popular Christmas song that is often performed at Christmas concerts. In the summer of 1999, she toured in the Rhapsody in Rock.

In 2001, she released Sov på min arm, an album based on Christian hymns, gospel melodies and intimate ballads. It became one of the most-sold albums in Scandinavia that year. In 2002, she release the pop/country album My Show, which received great reviews. The album, which marked Häggkvist's return to the pop scene, contained several hits such as "The Light", "I believe in love", which also topped the Estonian and Brazilian charts, and "A Kiss Goodbye". Even though the album only peaked at number 6 on the Swedish album chart, it sold 100,000 copies by the end of the year. In the summer, Häggkvist embarked on a huge and luxurious Scandinavian tour.

In 2003, Häggkvist submitted a song, "Autumn Leaf", for Melodifestivalen 2003. Having performed the demo, she was required to perform the song when it qualified for the competition. Häggkvist decided against doing that, and the song was disqualified from the competition. "Autumn Leaf" appeared on Häggkvist's next album, Guld, platina & passion, in Swedish as "När löven faller" (When the leaves fall). The ballad became an enormous hit. Guld, platina & passion reached number 1 on the Swedish charts and sold over 300,000 copies. She also recorded her favorite Elvis Presley songs, "Walk a mile in my shoes" and "If I can dream". The following year, Häggkvist released a religious album, Credo, which she described as "an expression of my love for God". The album peaked at spot 2 on the Swedish album chart. This was followed by Störst av allt, which Dan Backman of Svenska Dagbladet wrote featured "spiritually aimed music…revolving around belonging, love, death and eternity". Genom Allt became a huge radio hit in Sweden and the soul ballad "Allt kommer bli bra mamma", a dedication to her deceased mother, became popular at religious events.

=== 2005–present: Return to Eurovision ===
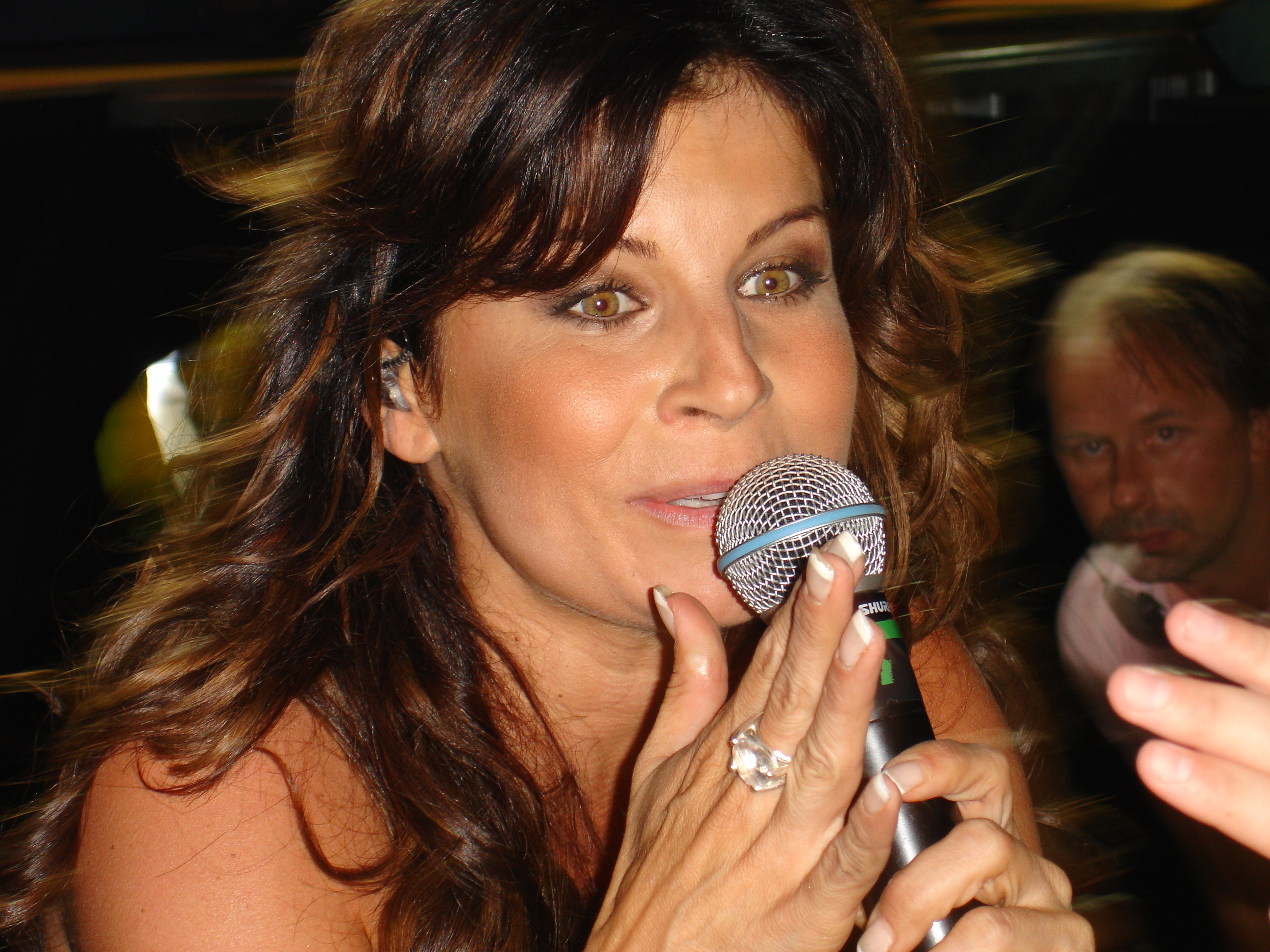
Carola in 2006

Having performed as part of the interval act at Melodifestivalen 2005, Häggkvist confirmed that she would return to the competition in 2006. She performed "Evighet" ("Eternity"), written by Bobby Ljunggren, Henrik Wikström and Thomas G:son, which she described as a "true winning song". The song qualified from the fourth semi-final in Gothenburg on 11 March 2006, and was widely tipped to win the festival outright as the final at the Stockholm Globe Arena approached. Despite finishing second with the regional juries to Andreas Johnson, "Evighet" won the competition with 232 points. Prior to the contest, Carola visited 12 countries where she promoted her song. "Invincible" received a large amount of air play on the radios in these countries. The song qualified from the semi-final of the Eurovision Song Contest in Athens, in English as "Invincible". Häggkvist in the end finished fifth out of twenty-four with 170 points. This placing also made her the third-most successful artist in the history of Eurovision, counting by total points earned in her performances, with her three songs scoring a total of 442 points, behind only Dima Bilan, the 2006 runner-up and 2008 winner; and Loreen, winner of 2012 and 2023.

Following Melodifestivalen, Häggkvist released a pop album, Från nu till evighet ("From Now to Eternity"). Lennart Wrigholm reviewed the album for Musiklandet; he criticised the amount of new material on the album: "Has this old lady really got such a workload that she cannot put more than ten new tracks on her album?" and wrote that the inclusion of the English version of "Evighet" as a bonus track was "an insult to the potential buyer". On the other hand, Expressen's Anders Nunstedt wrote that on "Jag ger allt" ("I Give It All") "the title does not lie" and that "Vem kan älska mig" ("Who Can Love Me") features a "brilliant refrain". The album topped the Swedish sales chart, and sold approximately 100,000 copies by the end of the year. Stanna eller gå, a Latin-inspired pop song, became a radio hit during the summer. Following the album's release, Häggkvist toured Sweden and received outstanding reviews. During the autumn, Häggkvist had problems with her voice but nonetheless sang "Because We Believe", a song written by Andrea Bocelli, with the Italian tenor.

In late 2007, Häggkvist released another Christmas album, I denna natt blir världen ny ("There is a New World This Night"), a sequel to Jul i Betlehem. The album featured songs in Swedish and English, and was recorded in Jerusalem in June 2007. Stefan Malmqvist of Svenska Dagbladet wrote that, as in previous Christmas albums, Häggkvist is "a saccharine version of herself" when singing Christmas carols. The album was reported to have sold 90,000 copies. Included on the album was the gospel song Go and Tell It on the Mountain. After the release she toured Scandinavia.

Carola entered Melodifestivalen 2008 as part of the duo Johnson & Häggkvist with Andreas Johnson. Their first single was called "Lucky Star" which became popular on the radio. In the melodifestival in February, they sang "One Love", written by Carola, Johnson and Peter Kvint. They were the early favourites to win the whole show, taking part in the second qualifier. They qualified for the Second Chance round, missing out on an automatic final spot. Though widely tipped to qualify for the final after all, they did not even proceed from the first voting round in the Second Chance programme. Although One Love did not become an enormous success, the song Lucky Star which they released a few months prior to the contest did sell well, and topped the Swedish charts for weeks. Carola decided to take it easy the rest of the year, but did embark on a small Christmas tour at the end of the year. In 2009, Carola was reportedly working on her upcoming album, and other projects. She went to the United States to record some new material. She departed from her recording company and signed a contract with X5 Music Group, in which she aims to transfer her music abroad through the internet. In June, she hosted Carola Camp, a camp designed to help talented young singers and entertainers. In May, she performed at the Eurovision Song Contest held in Moscow at the kick-off ceremony, performing her 3 Eurovision songs. In July, she performed, together with the Eurovision winner Alexander Rybak in Norway and sang "Fairytale" and "Främling" and The Jackson 5's "I'll Be There". At the end of 2009, she released the album Christmas in Bethlehem, which contained duets with artists like Paul Potts. She embarked on yet another Christmas tour, visiting Sweden, Norway, Denmark and Finland. She also launched her new website.

Carola attended in the final of the Eurovision Song Contest 2013 in Malmö and performed in a humorous interval act about Swedish culture.

In the summer of 2010, Carola embarked on tour across Sweden, singing the hits of both Elvis Presley and Barbra Streisand. The influence came from Carola's childhood, where her father and her mother would play records by both their favourite artists. The tour was an instant success, selling out and becoming one of the few tours to sell out that year. She took time out from the tour to appear on Allsång på Skansen, and in March 2011 she released a studio album, containing twelve songs.

In 2014 Häggkvist participated in Så mycket bättre on TV4.

Carola attended the final of the Eurovision Song Contest 2016 in Stockholm and was briefly interviewed on screen along with another previous Swedish winner Loreen.

In late-October 2016, she released her new Christmas album titled Drömmen om julen. The release was followed by a tour.

In August 2020, Häggkvist collaborated with Swedish singer Zara Larsson on a cover of Häggkvist's 1983 song "Säg mig var du står", which was released as a single in Scandinavia. Larsson later selected "Säg mig var du står" as the final song in Rolling Stone's "My Life in 10 Songs" feature, describing Häggkvist as "the voice of Sweden" and discussing how Häggkvist influenced her vocal style and the type of artist she wanted to become.

In April 2021, it was announced that Carola would be the spokesperson for Sweden at the Eurovision Song Contest 2021, reading out the Swedish jury points at the Grand Final. She performed "Waterloo" with Charlotte Perrelli and Conchita Wurst as an interval act for the final of the Eurovision Song Contest 2024.

== Personal life and media attention ==
She became an evangelical Christian in 1988 and was a member of the Word of Life (Sweden) until 1995.

She was married to Runar Søgaard, a Norwegian Christian preacher, with whom she has a son, Amadeus. The couple divorced in 2000, after ten years of marriage. In 2012, she adopted a daughter, Zoe, from South Africa, whose parents had both died in 2004.

In 2015 she assisted a man with transporting eight refugees on the Greek island of Kos. She prevented thieves from stealing the refugees' boat engine, but caused a high-speed car chase. At a police station, the motor thieves accused her of illegally transporting refugees. She was arrested, but released a few hours later with no charges.

=== Controversy regarding opinions on homosexuality ===
In an interview in 2002 for the Swedish gay magazine QX, she alienated many gay and some heterosexual fans by alleging that she knew homosexual people who had become heterosexual through prayers. She also said that homosexuality would always remain "unnatural" to her.

Four years later, in March 2006, her comment was brought up when she participated in the Swedish national selection for the Eurovision Song Contest. During a press conference a journalist tried to ask her about her opinions on homosexuality, but she did not answer. On 15 March 2006, Rickard Engfors, who was Carola's singing partner during the Melodifestivalen and Eurovision Song Contest 2006, said "Carola doesn't hate gays. If she did, I wouldn't work for her. She is a fantastic person." During an exclusive interview for one of the Eurovision-related websites before the 2006 contest, Carola was also questioned about this, and she stated that she "would love for every gay person to feel that she loves them" and that she does not think that "being gay is a sickness." She went on to criticize the tabloids for misinterpreting her original words and making an issue out of it. Later in the interview, she also commented on one of her supporting dancers being gay and his boyfriend being "great".

In 2008, she spoke to the newspaper Aftonbladet and again revisited her opinions about homosexuality, which she insisted have evolved over the past two decades and are very inclusive. She said, "I actually invited gays from QX to my 25-year anniversary [concert], but QX turned it down. What can I do? I love all people. I love the gays. So I am definitely not homophobic in any way. We are here for the music and I have no wacky opinions. And I feel love from many homosexuals too."

In 2014, while participating on the TV show Så mycket bättre, she revealed that she had a romance with a woman in the 1980s. She said "I remember when I hung out with a girl actually in the '80s. We were definitely not a couple, but I tested. It was a bit hard because I felt an extreme attraction and a force in that, but I chose not to go further." On the 2019 series of Så mycket bättre, she was asked about possibly having a relationship with a woman in the future, and she said that it is a possibility.

== Discography ==
- Främling (1983)
- Steg för steg (1984)
- På egna ben (1984)
- Runaway (1986)
- Much More (1990)
- Jul (1991)
- My Tribute (1993)
- Personligt (1994)
- Blott en dag (1998)
- Jul i Betlehem (1999)
- Sov på min arm (2001)
- My Show (2001)
- Guld, platina & passion (2003)
- Credo (2004)
- Störst av allt (2005)
- Från nu till evighet (2006)
- I denna natt blir världen ny – Jul i Betlehem II (2007)
- Christmas in Bethlehem (2009)
- Elvis, Barbra & jag (2011)
- Drömmen om julen (2016)
- "Via Dolorosa, Maria Magdalenas kärlek" (2025)

== Dubbing ==
Year	Film	Role	Notes
1998	The Prince of Egypt	Miriam	Swedish voice-dub
2018	Kitty Is Not a Cat	Kitty	Swedish voice-dub

== Awards ==
In 2018, Häggkvist received the Stockholm Culture Awards medal at Riddarhuset in Stockholm, presented by Princess Marianne Bernadotte.

Häggkvist was awarded the Illis quorum medal by the Government of Sweden on 13 July 2023.

Awards and achievements
Preceded by (Italy) Toto Cutugno with "Insieme: 1992"	Winner of the Eurovision Song Contest; 1991	Succeeded by (Republic of Ireland) Linda Martin with "Why Me?
Preceded by Chips with "Dag efter dag"	Sweden in the Eurovision Song Contest; 1983	Succeeded by Herreys with "Diggi-Loo Diggi-Ley"
Preceded by Edin-Ådahl with "Som en vind"	Sweden in the Eurovision Song Contest; 1991	Succeeded by Christer Björkman with "I morgon är en annan dag"
Preceded by Martin Stenmarck with "Las Vegas"	Sweden in the Eurovision Song Contest; 2006	Succeeded by The Ark with "The Worrying Kind"
Preceded by (Denmark) Lecia Jønsson	OGAE Second Chance Contest winner 1990	Succeeded by (Sweden) Pernilla Wahlgren
