= List of Christmas albums =

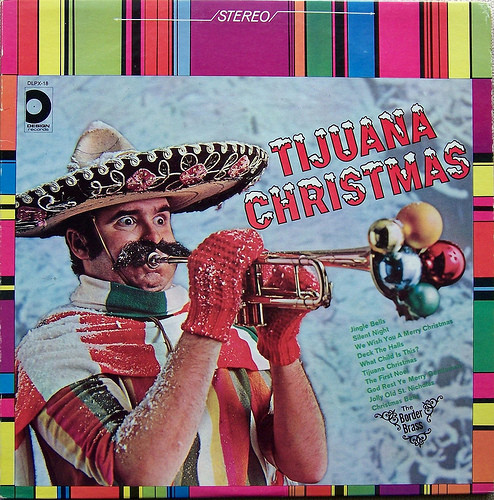
Tijuana Christmas by The Border Brass, 1967

A list of Christmas albums by year of release:

== 1940s ==
=== 1945 ===
- Merry Christmas – Bing Crosby

=== 1946 ===
- Christmas Hymns and Carols – Robert Shaw and his RCA Victor Chorale
- Perry Como Sings Merry Christmas Music – Perry Como

=== 1947 ===
- The Small One – Bing Crosby

=== 1948 ===
- Christmas Songs by Sinatra – Frank Sinatra

== 1950s ==
=== 1950 ===
- Sing a Song of Christmas – The Ames Brothers

=== 1951 ===
- Christmas with Patti Page – Patti Page
- Mario Lanza Sings Christmas Songs – Mario Lanza

=== 1952 ===
- Christmas Day in the Morning – Burl Ives
- Christmas Hymns and Carols, Volume II – The Robert Shaw Chorale
- Christmas with Eddie Fisher – Eddie Fisher

=== 1953 ===
- Christmas with Arthur Godfrey and All the Little Godfreys – Arthur Godfrey

=== 1954 ===
- Irving Berlin's White Christmas – Rosemary Clooney
- Music of Christmas (mono) – Percy Faith and his Orchestra
- Selections from Irving Berlin's White Christmas – Bing Crosby, Rosemary Clooney, Danny Kaye, Peggy Lee, Trudy Stevens, The Skylarks
- Winter Sequence – Ralph Burns and Leonard Feather

=== 1955 ===
- Carols for Christmas – Norman Luboff Choir
- Christmas with The Andrews Sisters – The Andrews Sisters
- Christmas with Patti Page – Patti Page
- Happy Holiday – Jo Stafford
- A Merry Christmas with the Four Aces – The Four Aces
- The Sounds of Christmas – The Three Suns

=== 1956 ===
- A Christmas Sing with Bing Around the World – Bing Crosby
- Joy to the World by The Roger Wagner Chorale – Roger Wagner Chorale
- Lanza Sings Christmas Carols – Mario Lanza
- Merry Christmas from Lawrence Welk and His Champagne Music – Lawrence Welk
- Perry Como Sings Merry Christmas Music – Perry Como

=== 1957 ===
- A Christmas Story – An Axe, an Apple and a Buckskin Jacket – Bing Crosby
- Elvis' Christmas Album – Elvis Presley
- A Jolly Christmas from Frank Sinatra – Frank Sinatra

=== 1958 ===
- Christmas Carols – Billy Vaughn and His Orchestra
- Christmas Hymns and Carols – Mario Lanza
- Christmas Sing-Along with Mitch – Mitch Miller & The Gang
- Merry Christmas – Johnny Mathis
- To Wish You a Merry Christmas – Harry Belafonte

=== 1959 ===
- Carols for Christmas – Eileen Farrell
- Carols of All Seasons – Jean Ritchie
- Christmas in My Heart – Connie Francis
- Christmas with Conniff – Ray Conniff
- It's Christmas Once Again – Jimmie Rodgers with Joe Reisman and His Orchestra
- Lanza Sings Christmas Carols (stereo recording) – Mario Lanza
- Merry Christmas – The Mills Brothers
- Messiah – Mormon Tabernacle Choir
- Music of Christmas (stereo) – Percy Faith and his Orchestra
- Season's Greetings from Perry Como – Perry Como
- Sing We Now of Christmas – The Harry Simeone Chorale
- White Christmas – Pat Boone
- A Winter Romance – Dean Martin

== 1960s ==
=== 1960 ===
- The 25th Day of December – Bobby Darin
- Christmas Carousel – Peggy Lee
- Christmas Spirituals – Odetta
- Ella Wishes You a Swinging Christmas – Ella Fitzgerald
- A Keely Christmas – Keely Smith
- The Last Month of the Year – The Kingston Trio
- The Magic of Christmas – Nat King Cole
- The Nutcracker Suite – Duke Ellington
- The Swingin' Nutcracker – Shorty Rogers

=== 1961 ===
- Charles Brown Sings Christmas Songs – Charles Brown
- Christmas with Chet Atkins – Chet Atkins
- Christmas with The Chipmunks – Alvin and the Chipmunks
- Christmas with The Louvin Brothers – The Louvin Brothers
- Holiday Sing Along with Mitch – Mitch Miller & The Gang
- A Merry Christmas! – Stan Kenton
- A Music Box Christmas – Rita Ford's Music Boxes
- Perry Como Sings Merry Christmas Music (reissue) – Perry Como
- Sound of Christmas – Ramsey Lewis
- This Time of Year – June Christy
- We Wish You the Merriest: An All-Star Christmas – compilation

=== 1962 ===
- The 4 Seasons Greetings – The Four Seasons
- Christmas Day with Kitty Wells – Kitty Wells
- Christmas with Eddy Arnold – Eddy Arnold
- Christmas with the Everly Brothers and the Boys Town Choir – The Everly Brothers
- The Glorious Sound of Christmas – Philadelphia Orchestra and Temple University Concert Choir
- I Wish You a Merry Christmas – Bing Crosby
- Jingle Bell Jazz – compilation
- Merry Christmas from Bobby Vee – Bobby Vee
- ’Twas the Night Before Christmas – Huey "Piano" Smith and the Clowns
- The Twenty-Fifth Day of December – The Staple Singers
- We Wish You a Merry Christmas – Ray Conniff

=== 1963 ===
- The Andy Williams Christmas Album – Andy Williams
- A Christmas Gift for You from Philles Records – compilation
- Christmas Shopping – Buck Owens and His Buckaroos
- The Christmas Spirit – Johnny Cash
- Christmas with McGriff – Jimmy McGriff
- Christmas with The Chipmunks, Volume 2 – The Chipmunks
- Christmas with The Miracles – The Miracles
- Christmas with The Platters – The Platters
- Christmas Wonderland – Bert Kaempfert
- The Joy of Christmas – Leonard Bernstein Conducting the New York Philharmonic and The Mormon Tabernacle Choir
- The Many Moods of Christmas – Robert Shaw
- Merry Christmas from Jackie Wilson – Jackie Wilson
- Sleigh Bells, Jingle Bells, and Bluebelles – Patti LaBelle and The Bluebelles
- Sounds of Christmas – Johnny Mathis
- Twelve Songs of Christmas – Jim Reeves

=== 1964 ===
- 12 Songs of Christmas – Frank Sinatra, Bing Crosby, and Fred Waring's Pennsylvanians
- The Beach Boys' Christmas Album – The Beach Boys
- Blue Christmas – Ernest Tubb
- Christmas '64 – Jimmy Smith
- Christmas Greetings from Jerry Vale – Jerry Vale
- The Doris Day Christmas Album – Doris Day
- Holiday Soul – Bobby Timmons
- Holiday Soul – Don Patterson
- The Joyful Season – Jo Stafford
- Jul, jul, strålande jul – Ingvar Wixell
- Merry Christmas from Brenda Lee – Brenda Lee
- More Sounds of Christmas – Ramsey Lewis
- Original Sound Track and Music from Rudolph The Red Nosed Reindeer – Burl Ives
- That Holiday Feeling! – Steve Lawrence & Eydie Gormé
- A Very Merry Christmas – Bobby Vinton

=== 1965 ===
- A Charlie Brown Christmas – Vince Guaraldi
- Christmas with Buck Owens and his Buckaroos – Buck Owens and his Buckaroos
- Have a Holly Jolly Christmas – Burl Ives
- The Heart of Christmas (Cuor' di Natale) – Sergio Franchi
- Here We Come A-Caroling – Ray Conniff
- Jimmy Dean's Christmas Card – Jimmy Dean
- Merry Christmas – Andy Williams
- Merry Christmas – The Supremes
- O Bambino – The Little Drummer Boy – The Harry Simeone Chorale
- The Ventures’ Christmas Album – The Ventures

=== 1966 ===
- Christmas Carols For Solo Guitar – Charlie Byrd
- Christmas Cheer – Harry Secombe
- Christmas Is... – Percy Faith, His Orchestra and Chorus
- Christmas Is A Comin' – Pat Boone
- Country Christmas – Loretta Lynn
- The Dean Martin Christmas Album – Dean Martin
- Firestone Presents Your Favorite Christmas Carols Volume 5 – compilation
- Have Yourself a Soulful Little Christmas – Kenny Burrell
- In the Christmas Spirit – Booker T. & the M.G.'s
- James Brown Sings Christmas Songs – James Brown
- Merry from Lena – Lena Horne
- A Merry Mancini Christmas – Henry Mancini
- Noël – Joan Baez
- Songs for a Merry Christmas – Wayne Newton
- Wild Christmas – Mae West

=== 1967 ===
- All I Want for Christmas Is My Two Front Teeth – Arthur Godfrey
- Atlantic Christmas – Dick Nolan
- Carol Singers (EP) – Cliff Richard
- A Christmas Album – Barbra Streisand
- A Christmas Present... And Past – Paul Revere and The Raiders
- Christmas with Ed Ames – Ed Ames
- Christmas with Marty Robbins – Marty Robbins
- Do You Hear What I Hear?: Christmas with Anita Bryant – Anita Bryant
- Ella Fitzgerald's Christmas – Ella Fitzgerald
- Jim Nabors' Christmas Album – Jim Nabors
- Jul med Hep Stars – Hep Stars
- My Kind of Christmas – Mike Douglas
- Someday at Christmas – Stevie Wonder
- Tijuana Christmas – The Border Brass

=== 1968 ===
- Christmas Album – Herb Alpert
- Christmas Isn't Christmas Without You – Wayne Newton
- Christmas Shopping – Buck Owens and His Buckaroos
- Christmastime – The Swingle Singers
- Christmas With Mahalia – Mahalia Jackson
- For Christmas with Love – Judith Durham
- The Magic of Christmas – The Soulful Strings
- The New Possibility – John Fahey
- Peace – Rotary Connection
- The Perry Como Christmas Album – Perry Como
- Robert Goulet's Wonderful World of Christmas – Robert Goulet
- The Sinatra Family Wish You a Merry Christmas – The Sinatra Family (Frank Sinatra, Nancy Sinatra, Frank Sinatra Jr., Tina Sinatra)
- Snowfall: The Tony Bennett Christmas Album – Tony Bennett
- Soul Christmas – compilation
- A Soulful Christmas – James Brown
- That Christmas Feeling – Glen Campbell

=== 1969 ===
- Carols From King's – Choir of King's College, Cambridge
- Christmas – Bill Anderson
- Give Me Your Love for Christmas – Johnny Mathis
- A Jack Jones Christmas – Jack Jones
- Jul, jul, strålande jul – Artur Erikson and Anna-Lena Löfgren
- Merry Ole Soul – Duke Pearson
- The Ray Price Christmas Album – Ray Price
- Spend This Holiday with Me – The Anita Kerr Singers

== 1970s ==
=== 1970 ===
- Asalto Navideño – Willie Colón and Héctor Lavoe
- Christmas Album – Bobby Sherman
- Christmas Is Johnny Farnham – Johnny Farnham
- Christmas with Nora Aunor – Nora Aunor
- Feliz Navidad – José Feliciano
- From Then to You – The Beatles
- Hey America – James Brown
- Jackson 5 Christmas Album – The Jackson 5
- Joy to the World – Mormon Tabernacle Choir
- Merry Christmas from the Brady Bunch – The Brady Bunch
- The Season for Miracles – Smokey Robinson & The Miracles
- The Temptations’ Christmas Card – The Temptations

=== 1971 ===
- The Christmas Album – Lynn Anderson
- Elvis Sings The Wonderful World of Christmas – Elvis Presley
- A Partridge Family Christmas Card – The Partridge Family
- A Time to Be Jolly – Bing Crosby

=== 1972 ===
- Christmas at the White House – Burl Ives
- The Johnny Cash Family Christmas – Johnny Cash
- Merry X'mas to All – Frances Yip
- Nu tändas tusen juleljus – Anna-Lena Löfgren

=== 1973 ===
- Christmas at the Patti – Man and Help Yourself with guests Deke Leonard, Dave Edmunds and B J Cole
- Merle Haggard's Christmas Present – Merle Haggard
- A Motown Christmas – compilation
- My Special Prayer – Gert Potgieter

=== 1974 ===
- Christmas – Charlie McCoy
- Christmas Favorites – Robert Merrill & The Royal Philharmonic Orchestra
- Christmas Party – Candlelight with Tonny Eyk Quartet and Frans Poptie
- Christmas Present – Andy Williams
- Happy Xmas Party – George Chisholm and His Snowmen
- A Magic Christmas – The Magic Organ
- Singalongamax-mas – Max Bygraves
- The Waltons’ Christmas Album – Earl Hamner/The Holiday Singers

=== 1975 ===
- Christmas with John Fahey Vol. II – John Fahey
- Joy to the World – Connie Smith
- Jul med tradition – Anita Lindblom
- Merry Christmas from Sesame Street – Sesame Street
- Rocky Mountain Christmas – John Denver

=== 1976 ===
- Christmas Dreams – Johnny McEvoy
- Christmas Jollies – Vincent Montana, Jr.
- Funky Christmas – compilation
- Nueva Navidad – Ednita Nazario
- Osmond Christmas Album – The Osmonds

=== 1977 ===
- Christmas by the Bay – Burl Ives
- Merry Christmas / Feliz Navidad – Freddy Fender
- Nowell Sing We Clear – Nowell Sing We Clear

=== 1978 ===
- Christmas Card – The Statler Brothers
- Christmas Portrait – Carpenters
- Christmas with Rosemary Clooney – Rosemary Clooney
- En julhälsning från Nils-Börge Gårdh – Nils-Börge Gårdh
- Min barndoms jul – Mia Marianne and Per Filip

=== 1979 ===
- John Denver and the Muppets: A Christmas Together – John Denver
- Light of the Stable – Emmylou Harris
- Pretty Paper – Willie Nelson
- Vikingarnas julparty – Vikingarna

== 1980s ==
=== 1980 ===
- Christmas in the Stars: Star Wars Christmas Album – compilation
- Classic Christmas – Johnny Cash
- Give Love at Christmas – The Temptations

=== 1981 ===
- Céline Dion chante Noël – Céline Dion
- Children's Christmas Songs – Franciscus Henri
- Christmas – Kenny Rogers
- Christmas Album – Boney M.
- Christmas Jollies II – The Salsoul Orchestra
- A Christmas Record – compilation
- Christmas Wishes – Anne Murray
- I kväll jag tänder ett ljus – Stefan Borsch
- Nu tändas tusen juleljus – Agnetha Fältskog and Linda Ulvaeus

=== 1982 ===
- Christmas – The Oak Ridge Boys
- Christmas (Navidad) – Alfredo Rolando Ortiz
- A Christmas Dream – Richard Clayderman
- Christmas in New Orleans with Johnny Adams – Johnny Adams
- Christmas with Maureen Forrester – Maureen Forrester
- December – George Winston
- Es Navidad – Menudo
- A Gatlin Family Christmas – Larry Gatlin and the Gatlin Brothers Band
- Goin' Home for Christmas – Merle Haggard
- Grandma Got Run Over by a Reindeer – Elmo and Patsy
- I Wish It Could Be Christmas Forever – Perry Como
- It’s Christmas Time Again – compilation
- Jul med... – Vera Cruz
- That Special Time of Year – Gladys Knight & The Pips
- Trucker's Christmas – Weihnachten mit Dave Dudley – Dave Dudley

=== 1983 ===
- An Austin Rhythm and Blues Christmas – compilation
- A Boston Rock Christmas – compilation
- Chants et contes de Noël – Céline Dion
- A Christmas Album – Amy Grant
- Christmas Is the Man from Galilee – Christy Lane
- Christmas: The Gift Goes On – Sandi Patti
- Christmastime – David Benoit
- David Grisman's Acoustic Christmas – Dave Grisman
- East Tennessee Christmas – Chet Atkins
- Julefrid med Carola – Carola Häggkvist
- The Many Moods of Christmas – Robert Shaw
- White Christmas – Al Green

=== 1984 ===
- Christmas – Mannheim Steamroller
- Christmas at Our House – Barbara Mandrell
- Christmas Caroling – Ray Conniff
- Christmas with Boney M. – Boney M.
- A Midnight Xmas Mess – compilation
- An Old-Fashioned Christmas – Carpenters
- Once Upon a Christmas – Kenny Rogers & Dolly Parton
- Once Upon a Christmas: The Original Story – compilation
- Rockin’ Christmas: The 50’s – compilation
- Rockin’ Christmas: The 60’s – compilation
- Tidings of Comfort and Joy – Roger Whittaker
- A Total Experience Christmas – compilation
- A Winter’s Tale – Alan Garrity

=== 1985 ===
- 3 Ships – Jon Anderson
- The Animals' Christmas – Art Garfunkel & Amy Grant
- Christmas – Alabama
- Christmas All Over the World – New Edition
- Christmas Present – The Statler Brothers
- Controversia – Danny Rivera, Vicente Carattini and Los Cantores
- Crackers – Slade
- Julens sånger – Vikingarna
- Now – The Christmas Album – compilation
- The Spirit of Christmas – Ray Charles
- Tennessee Christmas – compilation

=== 1986 ===
- The 20 Greatest Christmas Songs – Boney M.
- Christmas – Elaine Paige
- Christmas with The Jets – The Jets
- Christmas with Ronnie Milsap – Ronnie Milsap
- Cool Yule: A Collection of Rockin’ Stocking Stuffers – compilation
- A Crystal Christmas – Crystal Gayle
- En julhälsning från Cyndee – Cyndee Peters
- Have Yourself a Merry Little Christmas – Rita Reys
- Jul i Kvinnaböske – Hasse Andersson
- Merry Christmas Strait to You! – George Strait
- Ofrenda – Danny Rivera
- Rockin’ Little Christmas – compilation

=== 1987 ===
- The Christmas Album – Air Supply
- Christmas Memories – Evie
- Christmas Night – Cambridge Singers
- Christmas Time with the Judds – The Judds
- Glade Jul – Sissel Kyrkjebø
- Låt mig få tända ett ljus – Jan Malmsjö
- Merry Christmas to You – Reba McEntire
- Min barndoms jular – Kikki Danielsson
- Santa Must Be Polish – Bobby Vinton
- Stilla Natt – Sissel Kyrkjebø
- A Tapestry of Carols – Maddy Prior
- To Drive the Cold Winter Away – Loreena McKennitt
- A Very Special Christmas – compilation
- Weihnachten mit den Flippers – Die Flippers

=== 1988 ===
- Christmas – compilation
- Christmas Classics – compilation
- Christmas Island – Leon Redbone
- Cool Yule, Vol. 2 – compilation
- Crackers International – Erasure
- A Fresh Aire Christmas – Mannheim Steamroller
- A GRP Christmas Collection – compilation
- Hillbilly Holiday – compilation
- Merry Christmas – Daniel Johnston
- My Gift to You – Alexander O’Neal
- Nowell Sing We Four – Nowell Sing We Clear
- Twisted Christmas – Bob Rivers

=== 1989 ===
- The Best of Cool Yule – compilation
- Billboard Greatest Christmas Hits (1935–1954) – compilation
- Billboard Greatest Christmas Hits (1955–Present) – compilation
- Bummed Out Christmas – compilation
- Christmas – Michael W. Smith
- Christmas Blues – Holly Cole
- Christmas in America – Kenny Rogers
- Crescent City Christmas Card – Wynton Marsalis
- Dr. Demento Presents the Greatest Christmas Novelty CD of All-Time – compilation
- Have Yourself a Jazzy Little Christmas – compilation
- Hipsters’ Holiday: Vocal Jazz and R&B Classics – compilation
- Home for Christmas – Debby Boone
- It's the Thought... – Twila Paris
- Julen är här – Tommy Körberg
- Merry Merry – Miho Nakayama
- Merry, Merry Christmas – New Kids on the Block
- An Old Time Christmas – Randy Travis
- Ricky Van Shelton Sings Christmas – Ricky Van Shelton

== 1990s ==
=== 1990 ===
- Acoustic Christmas – T Bone Burnett
- Because It's Christmas – Barry Manilow
- Billboard Greatest Country Christmas Hits – compilation
- Billboard Greatest R&B Christmas Hits – compilation
- Christmas in Our Hearts – Jose Mari Chan
- Christmas Kisses: Christmas Classics from Capitol’s Early Years – compilation
- Christmas Party with Eddie G. – compilation
- Christmas with Etta Jones – Etta Jones
- Christmas, Like a Lullaby – John Denver
- Great Songs of Christmas – compilation
- Home for Christmas – Dolly Parton
- I Still Believe in Santa Claus – Andy Williams
- Julstämning – Loa Falkman
- Our Christmas – compilation
- Poets & Angels – Ottmar Liebert
- That Holiday Feelin' – Joe Williams
- This Christmas – Patti LaBelle
- The Truth About Christmas – Vanessa Bell Armstrong
- We Three Kings – The Roches

=== 1991 ===
- The Bells of Dublin – The Chieftains
- Blue Yule: Christmas Blues and R&B Classics – compilation
- Christmas – Don McLean
- Christmas – Stephanie Mills
- Christmas EP – Mary Margaret O'Hara
- Christmas Song Book – Helen Merrill
- Country Christmas – Johnny Cash
- Cowboy Christmas: Cowboy Songs II – Michael Martin Murphey
- En Lillsk jul – Lill Lindfors
- A GRP Christmas Collection, Vol. II – compilation
- He Is Christmas – Take 6
- Jul – Carola Søgaard
- A Lump of Coal – compilation
- Merry Christmas – Glen Campbell
- Merry Christmas, Baby: Romance and Reindeer from Capitol Records – compilation
- Stilla jul – Åsa Jinder
- Together with Cliff Richard – Cliff Richard
- The Tradition of Christmas – compilation
- Wenches jul – Wenche Myhre
- Winter Creek – Tony Elman
- Yule Struttin’: A Blue Note Christmas – compilation

=== 1992 ===
- Alligator Stomp, Vol. 4: Cajun Christmas – compilation
- Bash! – Rockapella
- Beyond the Season – Garth Brooks
- Blue Christmas – Elvis Presley
- The Christmas Album – Neil Diamond
- The Christmas Album – The Manhattan Transfer
- A Christmas Song – Russ Taff
- Christmas Songs – Mel Tormé
- Commodores Christmas – The Commodores
- Doo Wop Christmas – compilation
- The First Christmas – Doug Stone
- Home for Christmas – Amy Grant
- Let It Snow!: Cuddly Christmas Classics from Capitol – compilation
- Merry Christmas from Harmony Ranch – Riders in the Sky
- My Christmas Dream – Russ Peterson
- Rhino Presents: Home for Christmas – compilation
- A Romantic Christmas – John Tesh
- A Travis Tritt Christmas: Loving Time of the Year – Travis Tritt
- A Very Special Christmas 2 – compilation

=== 1993 ===
- Christmas – Bruce Cockburn
- Christmas in the City – compilation
- Christmas in Vienna – Diana Ross, Plácido Domingo and José Carreras
- Christmas Interpretations – Boyz II Men
- Christmas Through Your Eyes – Gloria Estefan
- Good News – Kathy Mattea
- GRP Christmas Collection, Vol. III – compilation
- Happy Holidays: Warm and Wonderful Christmas Favorites – compilation
- Hey Santa! – Carnie and Wendy Wilson
- Home for the Holidays – Glen Campbell
- Honky Tonk Christmas – Alan Jackson
- I Am Santa Claus – Bob Rivers and Twisted Radio
- A John Prine Christmas – John Prine
- Julestemninger – Elisabeth Andreassen
- A LaFace Family Christmas – compilation
- Let There Be Peace on Earth – Vince Gill
- Ren & Stimpy's Crock O' Christmas – Ren & Stimpy
- Rock n' Roll Christmas – Dion
- The Season of Love – 4Him
- Season's Greetings – Tatsuro Yamashita
- The Spirit of Christmas 1993 – compilation
- When My Heart Finds Christmas – Harry Connick, Jr.

=== 1994 ===
- Absolute Christmas – compilation
- B. E. Taylor Christmas – B. E. Taylor
- Billboard Rock ’N’ Roll Christmas – compilation
- A Carnival Christmas – Insane Clown Posse
- Chant Noël: Chants for the Holiday Season – compilation
- The Christmas Album Volume II – Neil Diamond
- Christmas in Vienna II – Dionne Warwick and Plácido Domingo
- Christmas Spirit – Donna Summer
- Christmas Time – Eddy Arnold
- Christmas Time's A-Comin' – Sammy Kershaw
- Christmas with Houston Person and Friends – Houston Person
- Christmas with Willie Nelson – Willie Nelson
- Come Rejoice! A Judy Collins Christmas – Judy Collins
- Count Your Blessings – compilation
- Graham Parker’s Christmas Cracker (EP) – Graham Parker
- Have a Nice Christmas: Holiday Hits of the ’70s – compilation
- Holly & Ivy – Natalie Cole
- If Every Day Was Like Christmas – Elvis Presley
- Jingle Bell Jam: Jazz Christmas Classics – compilation
- Let It Snow! – Sally Harmon
- Merry Christmas – Mariah Carey
- Merry Christmas from London – Lorrie Morgan
- Miracles: The Holiday Album – Kenny G
- Mitt julkort – Jenny Öhlund
- När ljusen ska tändas därhemma – Christer Sjögren
- The New Andy Williams Christmas Album – Andy Williams
- Number One Christmas – Jeanie Seely
- Perry Como's Christmas Concert – Perry Como
- A Rock ’n’ Roll Christmas – compilation
- The Spirit of Christmas 1994 – compilation
- The Sweetest Gift – Trisha Yearwood
- A Very Merry Chipmunk – Alvin and the Chipmunks
- A Very Special Season – Diana Ross
- West Coast Bad Boyz: High fo Xmas – compilation
- Wurlitzer Christmas – Matthew Ross

=== 1995 ===
- An All-4-One Christmas – All-4-One
- Aussie Christmas with Bucko & Champs – Bucko and Champs
- Billboard Presents: Family Christmas Classics – compilation
- Billboard Top Christmas Hymns – compilation
- A Choral Christmas – Cusco
- Christmas for All – Kelly Family
- Christmas Here with You – Four Tops
- Christmas in the Aire – Mannheim Steamroller
- Christmas in Vienna III – Plácido Domingo, Charles Aznavour, and Sissel Kyrkjebø
- Christmas Through the Years – compilation
- Christmas to Christmas – Toby Keith
- Christmas with Glen Campbell – Glen Campbell
- The Edge of Christmas – compilation
- Have Yourself a Tractors Christmas – The Tractors
- Holiday – Russ Freeman
- Holidays in Dementia – Dr. Demento compilation
- Hymns of Christmas – Leon Russell
- James Brown’s Funky Christmas – James Brown
- Jazz to the World – compilation
- Kirk Franklin & the Family Christmas – Kirk Franklin and family
- (A Little Touch of) Baroque in Winter – Takako Minekawa
- Looking for Christmas – Clint Black
- Merry Christmas for You – Yuki Uchida
- Mr. Christmas – Joe Diffie
- The Music of Christmas – Steven Curtis Chapman
- O Holy Night – John Berry
- An Oscar Peterson Christmas – Oscar Peterson
- Punk Rock Xmas – compilation
- Santamental Journey: Pop Vocal Christmas Classics – compilation
- Sharing the Season, Volume III – Lorie Line
- Shut Up, It's Christmas – Steven Curtis Chapman
- The Spirit of Christmas 1995 – compilation
- This Is Christmas – Luther Vandross
- A Winter Garden: Five Songs for the Season – Loreena McKennitt

=== 1996 ===
- 12 Soulful Nights of Christmas – compilation
- Boney's Funky Christmas – Boney James
- Christmas – Jorma Kaukonen
- Christmas Eve and Other Stories – Trans-Siberian Orchestra
- Christmas Island – Jimmy Buffett
- Christmas on Death Row – compilation
- Christmas Vol. II – Alabama
- Christmas: The Gift – Collin Raye
- The Darkest Night of the Year – Over the Rhine
- A Dave Brubeck Christmas – Dave Brubeck
- Fruitcake – The Eraserheads
- The Gift – Kenny Rogers
- Jazz for Joy: A Verve Christmas Album – various artists
- Jul i Hasses lada – Hasse Andersson
- Just Can’t Get Enough: New Wave Xmas – compilation
- Just Say Noël – compilation
- Kevin and Bean's Christmastime in the LBC – Kevin and Bean
- Let's Share Christmas – John Pizzarelli
- Merry Arizona Two: Desert Stars Shine at Christmas – compilation
- O Holy Night! – United Cerebral Palsy
- Oi to the World! – Sandi Patty
- Peace on Earth – Kitaro
- Remembering Christmas – David Benoit
- A Rubber Band Christmas – novelty
- The Spirit of Christmas 1996 – compilation
- Star Bright – Vanessa Williams
- This Is the Time: The Christmas Album – Michael Bolton
- Tropical Christmas – The Bellamy Brothers
- Ultra–Lounge: Christmas Cocktails – compilation
- White Christmas – Rosemary Clooney
- Wintertide – Don Ross
- World Christmas – compilation

=== 1997 ===
- Breath of Heaven: A Holiday Collection – Grover Washington Jr.
- Child: Music for the Christmas Season – Jane Siberry
- Christmas – Rebecca St. James
- The Christmas Album – Nitty Gritty Dirt Band
- The Christmas Album – Roberta Flack
- Christmas at the Biltmore Estate – Judy Collins
- Christmas Dreams – Don McLean
- Christmas in Stereo – compilation
- Christmas Live – Mannheim Steamroller
- Christmas Turkey – The Arrogant Worms
- Come On Christmas – Dwight Yoakham
- December Makes Me Feel This Way – Dave Koz
- Do You Hear…Christmas – The Rankin Family
- Hallelujah, He Is Born – Sawyer Brown
- Ho Ho Ho – RuPaul
- A Home for the Holidays – compilation
- Merry Texas Christmas, Y'all – Asleep at the Wheel
- Min önskejul – Sanna Nielsen
- More Twisted Christmas – Bob Rivers & Twisted Radio
- Peace on Earth – Peabo Bryson
- Rated X Mas – Matt Rogers
- Ray Stevens Christmas: Through a Different Window – Ray Stevens
- Snowed In – Hanson
- Songs of the Season – Peter White
- A Special Christmas – SWV
- Ultra-Lounge: Christmas Cocktails, Part Two – compilation
- A Very Special Christmas 3 – compilation
- Watchu' Want for Christmas? – Big Bad Voodoo Daddy
- We Need a Little Christmas – Andy Williams
- What a Wonderful Christmas – Louis Armstrong & Friends

=== 1998 ===
- 12 Songs of Christmas – Etta James
- Aussie Christmas with Bucko & Champs 2 – Bucko and Champs
- Bethlehem – Brian McKnight
- Breath of Heaven: A Christmas Collection – Vince Gill
- Chicago XXV: The Christmas Album – Chicago
- Christmas – Sons of the San Joaquin
- The Christmas Album – Lee Kernaghan
- The Christmas Angel: A Family Story – Mannheim Steamroller
- The Christmas Attic – Trans-Siberian Orchestra
- Christmas Caravan – Squirrel Nut Zippers
- Christmas from the Heart – Kenny Rogers
- Christmas with Babyface – Babyface
- Christmastime – Michael W. Smith
- Christmastime Is Here – Lafayette Harris, Jr.
- Christougenna Me Tin Katy – Katy Garbi
- December – Kenny Loggins
- A Glen Campbell Christmas – Glen Campbell
- Happy Christmas – compilation
- Have Yourself a Merry Little Christmas (EP) – Diana Krall
- Holiday Songs and Lullabies – Shawn Colvin
- Home for Christmas – NSYNC
- Making Spirits Bright – Dean Martin compilation
- Merry Christmas ... Have a Nice Life – Cyndi Lauper
- Natty and Nice: A Reggae Christmas – compilation
- A Paul Brandt Christmas: Shall I Play for You? – Paul Brandt
- A Rock ’n’ Roll Christmas II – compilation
- The Spirit of Christmas 1998 – compilation
- These Are Special Times – Celine Dion
- This Christmas (I'd Rather Have Love) – Teddy Pendergrass
- Thorleifs jul – Thorleifs
- The Ultimate Beatles Christmas Collection – The Beatles
- Ultimate Christmas – The Beach Boys compilation
- The Voice of Christmas: The Complete Decca Christmas Songbook – Bing Crosby compilation
- White Christmas – Martina McBride
- Wir warten auf's Christkind... – Die Toten Hosen
- Yule B’ Swingin’ – compilation

=== 1999 ===
- Acoustic Christmas Carols: Cowboy Christmas II – Michael Martin Murphey
- Christmas – Low
- Christmas in Vienna VI – Plácido Domingo
- Christmas Song – Elisabeth von Trapp
- Christmas Songs with The Ray Brown Trio – Ray Brown Trio
- A Christmas Story – Point of Grace
- Christmas the Cowboy Way – Riders in the Sky
- A Christmas to Remember – Amy Grant
- Christmas Wish – Gina Jeffreys
- Faith: A Holiday Album – Kenny G
- Garth Brooks & the Magic of Christmas – Garth Brooks
- Happy Christmas Vol. 2 – compilation
- Happy Holidays: I Love the Winter Weather – Jo Stafford
- Here's Your Christmas Album – Bill Engvall
- Home for the Holidays – Lynn Anderson
- I Wanna Be Santa Claus – Ringo Starr
- Joy of Christmas – CHOPA
- Joy: A Holiday Collection – Jewel
- Jul i Betlehem – Carola Häggkvist
- Let's Get Christmas – Mike Viola & the Candy Butchers
- Local Licks: Yule Rock! – KLBJ
- The Magic of Christmas – Natalie Cole
- The Merry Christmas Album – James Brown
- Merry Christmas Wherever You Are – George Strait
- Our Very Best Christmas – Smokey Robinson & The Miracles
- Rockin’ Around the Christmas Tree: The Decca Christmas Recordings – Brenda Lee
- Secret of Giving: A Christmas Collection – Reba McEntire
- A Sentimental Christmas – Kathy Troccoli
- Smooth Grooves: A Sensual Christmas – compilation
- Snowbound – Fourplay
- Songs of Christmas – Irish Rovers
- The Spirit of Christmas – Chuck Brown
- The Spirit of Christmas 1999 – compilation
- This Christmas – 98 Degrees
- A Very Special Christmas Live – compilation
- Winter Nights – Al Di Meola

== 2000s ==
=== 2000 ===
- 24 Decembre (EP) – Pizzicato Five
- Another Rosie Christmas – Rosie O'Donnell
- B. E. Taylor Christmas 2 – B. E. Taylor
- Blue Christmas – Ricky Van Shelton
- Brand New Year – SHeDAISY
- Chipmunks Roasting on an Open Fire – Bob Rivers
- Christmas – Rockapella
- Christmas Around the World – Bradley Joseph
- Christmas CD – Weezer
- Christmas Is Calling – Roch Voisine
- Christmas Time Again – Lynyrd Skynyrd
- Christmas Variations – Rick Wakeman
- Christmas: Our Gifts to You – The Winans
- Classic Christmas – Billy Gilman
- Dream a Dream – Charlotte Church
- Ett julkort från förr – Christer Sjögren
- Glen Campbell Christmas – Glen Campbell
- Happy Christmas Vol. 3 – compilation
- It's a Cool Cool Christmas – Xfm
- Joy: A Christmas Collection – Avalon
- Just Say Nowell – Nowell Sing We Clear
- L'album de Noël – Roch Voisine
- Mambo Santa Mambo: Christmas from the Latin Lounge – compilation
- A Merry Little Christmas – Linda Ronstadt
- My Kind of Christmas – Christina Aguilera
- Navidad – Lara & Reyes
- Platinum Christmas – compilation
- Ringing Gingle Bells – Chakra
- Santa's Got a Brand New Bag – Dmitri Matheny
- Sleighed: The Other Side of Christmas – compilation
- The Spirit of Christmas 2000 – compilation
- Switched on Christmas – Venus Hum
- This Christmas Time – Lonestar
- Together at Christmas – Etta Jones and Houston Person
- Yule B’ Swingin’ Too! – compilation
- Yule Be Wiggling – The Wiggles

=== 2001 ===
- 8 Days of Christmas – Destiny's Child
- Almost a Full Moon – Hawksley Workman
- Baby, It's Cold Outside – Holly Cole
- Broadway Cares: Home for the Holidays – compilation
- Christmas – Hillsong Music
- Christmas – Jaci Velasquez
- The Christmas Album – Lea Salonga
- A Christmas Celebration of Hope – compilation
- The Christmas Collection – Olivia Newton-John
- Christmas Extraordinaire – Mannheim Steamroller
- Christmas Memories – Barbra Streisand
- The Christmas Message – Kirk Whalum
- Christmas Wish (EP) – Stacie Orrico
- Christmas with Yolanda Adams – Yolanda Adams
- A December to Remember – Aaron Tippin
- Den Fagraste Rosa – Bukkene Bruse
- Heart Presents a Lovemongers' Christmas – Heart
- Holiday Strings – Michael Angelo Batio
- I midvintertid, en jul på Gotland – Ainbusk
- I tomteverkstan – Lasse Stefanz
- Jul, jul, strålande jul – Nils Börge Gårdh
- Lo, How a Rose – Donna Germano
- Morningtown Ride to Christmas – The Seekers
- MTV: TRL Christmas – compilation
- My Gift to You – Hayley Westenra
- A Nancy Wilson Christmas – Nancy Wilson
- A Not So Silent Night – The Ten Tenors
- Now That's What I Call Christmas! – compilation
- Pokémon Christmas Bash – Pokémon compilation
- Reflections on Yuletide – Chris Klich Jazz Quintet
- Samantha Sings Christmas – Samantha Mumba
- Save This Christmas for Me – Johnny Logan
- Silent Night – Brad Simmons
- A Smooth Jazz Christmas – Dave Koz
- Snowflakes – Toni Braxton
- Songs from Call Me Claus – Garth Brooks
- The Spirit of Christmas 2001 – compilation
- Swingin’ Christmas – compilation
- They Might Be Giants In... Holidayland – They Might Be Giants
- Välkommen till min jul – Jan Malmsjö
- Verve Presents: The Very Best of Christmas Jazz – compilation
- A Very Special Christmas 5 – compilation
- A Very Special Christmas with Rosemary Clooney – Rosemary Clooney
- VH1: The Big 80’s Christmas – compilation
- What a Wonderful Christmas – Anne Murray
- A Wild-Eyed Christmas Night – 38 Special

=== 2002 ===
- All the Joy in the World – Jump5
- Bluegrass & White Snow: A Mountain Christmas – Patty Loveless
- Boogie Woogie Christmas – Brian Setzer Orchestra
- Christmas – Clay Walker
- A Christmas Album – Bright Eyes
- The Christmas Album – Johnny Mathis
- Christmas at Home – Jennifer Rose
- A Christmas Gift of Love – Barry Manilow
- Christmas Is Almost Here – Carly Simon
- Christmas with the Rat Pack – compilation
- City on a Hill: It's Christmas Time – compilation
- Cledus Navidad – Cledus T. Judd
- Comfort & Joy – Rockapella
- Cowboy Christmas III – Michael Martin Murphey
- December – Chris Botti
- Frohes Fest – Unheilig
- The Gift of Christmas – En Vogue
- Holiday Harmony – America
- Home for Christmas – NSYNC
- It Won't Be Christmas Without You – Brooks & Dunn
- Jag kommer hem igen till jul – Peter Jöback
- Jingle All the Way – Crash Test Dummies
- Joulutorttu – Eläkeläiset
- A Joyful Noise – Jo Dee Messina
- Let It Be Christmas – Alan Jackson
- A Mary Mary Christmas – Mary Mary
- Maybe This Christmas – compilation
- Naughty or Nice – 3LW
- Pasko Naming Hangad – Hangad
- Rose of Bethlehem – Selah
- Santa Claus Lane – Hilary Duff
- Santa Hooked Me Up – B2K
- The Season for Romance – Lee Ann Womack
- Season's Greetings from Moe – Moe
- The Spirit of Christmas 2002 – compilation
- Swingin’ Christmas Party! – compilation
- This Time of Year – Steve Tyrell
- 'Tis the Season for Los Straitjackets! – Los Straitjackets
- White Trash Christmas – Bob Rivers
- Wishes: A Holiday Album – Kenny G
- WOW Christmas: Red – compilation

=== 2003 ===
- 20th Century Masters – The Christmas Collection: The Best of George Strait – George Strait
- 20th Century Masters – The Christmas Collection: The Best of Reba – Reba McEntire
- 2003 Winter Vacation in SMTown.com – SM Town
- All I Want for Christmas Is a Real Good Tan – Kenny G
- Ashanti's Christmas – Ashanti
- Chicago XXV: The Christmas Album – Chicago
- The Christmas Guest – Andy Griffith
- Christmas Remixed – compilation
- Cliff at Christmas – Cliff Richard
- December – The Moody Blues
- Deck the Halls, Bruise Your Hand – Relient K
- Go Tell It on the Mountain – The Blind Boys of Alabama
- Harry for the Holidays – Harry Connick, Jr.
- The Jethro Tull Christmas Album – Jethro Tull
- Joy for Christmas Day – Kathy Mattea
- Let It Snow (EP) – Michael Bublé
- Maybe This Christmas Too? – compilation
- Mistletoe and Wine – Mediæval Bæbes compilation
- Mr. Snowman – John Michael Montgomery
- Now That's What I Call Christmas!: The Signature Collection – compilation
- One Wish: The Holiday Album – Whitney Houston
- Peace – Jim Brickman
- Peace Round – Yellowjackets
- Pop Idol: The Idols – Xmas Factor – compilation
- Punk Rawk Christmas – MxPx
- A Santa Cause: It's a Punk Rock Christmas – compilation
- Santamental – Steve Lukather
- Shushan the Palace: Hymns of Earth – Jane Siberry
- The Spirit of Christmas 2003 – compilation
- A Very Special Acoustic Christmas – compilation
- Watching the Snow – Michael Franks
- What's It Gonna Be, Santa? – Chicago

=== 2004 ===
- 12 Days of Brumalia – The Residents
- All Star Christmas Collection – compilation
- Amazing Grace: Songs for Christmas – Paulini
- The Antichristmas Vol. 1 – World Metal Alliance
- Barenaked for the Holidays – Barenaked Ladies
- Christmas – Chris Isaak
- Christmas – Jimmy Eat World
- A Christmas Album – James Taylor
- Christmas Celebration – Mannheim Steamroller
- The Christmas Collection – Barbra Streisand
- The Christmas Gift from TVXQ – TVXQ
- Christmas Serenity – George Carlaw
- Christmas Time Is Here – Dianne Reeves
- Christmas Treasures – Bing Crosby compilation
- Christmas with Dino – Dean Martin compilation
- Christmas with You – Clint Black
- Christmastime! – Don McLean
- The Complete Columbia Christmas Recordings – Gene Autry
- Everything You Want for Christmas – Big Bad Voodoo Daddy
- Frank Sinatra Christmas Collection – Frank Sinatra compilation
- Gift Rap – compilation
- Hooray for Christmas – Janet Seidel
- Hung for the Holidays – William Hung
- I Wish I Was Santa Claus – Merle Haggard
- Jobe Bells – Afroman
- A John Waters Christmas – John Waters
- Jul i vårt hus – Lasse Berghagen
- The Lost Christmas Eve – Trans-Siberian Orchestra
- Maybe This Christmas Tree – compilation
- Merry Christmas – Jeanette
- Merry Christmas with Love – Clay Aiken
- My Favorite Time of the Year – Dionne Warwick
- The Night Before Christmas – David Hasselhoff
- Le Noël de Roch Voisine – Roch Voisine
- On Christmas Night – Cherish The Ladies
- Play Around the Christmas Tree – Play
- ReJoyce: The Christmas Album – Jessica Simpson
- Silver & Gold – Vanessa Williams
- Sing, Choirs of Angels! – Mormon Tabernacle Choir
- Snaildartha: The Story of Jerry the Christmas Snail – The Snaildartha 6
- The Spirit of Christmas 2004 – compilation
- Tidings – Allison Crowe
- A Traditional Christmas – Joe Nichols
- A Very Larry Christmas – Larry the Cable Guy
- What a Wonderful World – LeAnn Rimes
- When He Came – Martha Munizzi
- Winter – Steeleye Span
- You Just Gotta Love Christmas – Peter Cetera

=== 2005 ===
- An Acapella Christmas – The Manhattan Transfer
- All I Really Want for Christmas – Steven Curtis Chapman
- Believe – Natalie Grant
- Celebrating Christmas – Darlene Zschech
- Cheetah-licious Christmas – Cheetah Girls
- The Christ (A Song for Joseph) – Billy Dean
- The Christmas Collection – Il Divo
- Christmas Fantasy – Anita Baker
- Christmas in Australia – Adam Brand
- Christmas in Brobdingnag, Vol. 1 – Brobdingnagian Bards
- Christmas in My Heart – Sarah Connor
- The Christmas in You – Jill Johnson
- A Christmas Kind of Town – Marah
- Christmas Means Love – Joan Osborne
- Christmas Prayer – Aaron Neville
- The Christmas Sessions – MercyMe
- Christmas Songs – Diana Krall
- Christmas World – Banaroo
- Dig That Crazy Christmas – The Brian Setzer Orchestra
- Elton John's Christmas Party – Elton John
- A Faithful Christmas – Faith Evans
- From a Christmas Guitar – Gordon Quinton
- The Gift of Rock – Smash Mouth
- The Greatest Holiday Classics – Kenny G
- Happy Christmas Vol. 4 – compilation
- Home for Christmas – George Canyon
- An Irish Christmas – Moya Brennan
- The McGarrigle Christmas Hour – Kate & Anna McGarrigle
- Now That's Christmas – Brad Johner
- Schnappi's Winterfest – Schnappi
- The Spirit of Christmas 2005 – compilation
- Through the Many Winters: A Christmas Album – Michael McDonald
- Twelve Girls of Christmas – Twelve Girls Band
- Ultra-Lounge: Christmas Cocktails, Part Three – compilation
- We Three Kings – The Reverend Horton Heat
- What I Really Want for Christmas – Brian Wilson
- Winter Wonderland – Point of Grace
- Winter's Knight – Nox Arcana
- WOW Christmas: Green – compilation
- A Wright Christmas – Michelle Wright

=== 2006 ===
- Acoustic Hearts of Winter – Aly & AJ
- Billy "Crash" Craddock's Christmas Favorites – Billy "Crash" Craddock
- Brad Paisley Christmas – Brad Paisley
- Christmas Away from Home – Jay R
- A Christmas Celebration – Celtic Woman
- A Christmas Celebration – Gladys Knight
- Christmas Chants – Gregorian
- Christmas Is 4 Ever – Bootsy Collins
- Christmas Offerings – Third Day
- Christmas Present – Jody Whitesides
- Christmas Time with Oleta – Oleta Adams
- A Classic Christmas – Wynonna Judd
- Cool Yule – Bette Midler
- A Dipset X-Mas – compilation by Jim Jones
- Elvis Christmas – Elvis Presley compilation
- An Evening of Carols and Capers – Maddy Prior and the Carnival Band
- Fresh Cut Christmas – George Strait
- A Gift – Paul Brandt
- Happy Holidays – Billy Idol
- Henkäys ikuisuudesta – Tarja Turunen
- The Holiday Collection – Kenny G
- Home for Christmas – Hall & Oates
- James Taylor at Christmas – James Taylor
- Live from Etown: 2006 Christmas Special – Sarah McLachlan
- Lohan Holiday – Ali Lohan
- The Muppets: A Green and Red Christmas – The Muppets
- My Favourite Christmas Carols – Robin Gibb
- Navidad (EP) – Rojo
- Navidades – Luis Miguel
- Now That's What I Call Christmas! 3 – compilation
- One More Drifter in the Snow – Aimee Mann
- Sånger för december – Uno Svenningsson and Irma Schultz Keller
- A Santa Cause: It's a Punk Rock Christmas – compilation
- Snow Angels – Over the Rhine
- Songs for Christmas – Sufjan Stevens
- A Soulful Christmas – Brian Culbertson
- Sounds of the Season – Lionel Richie
- Sounds of the Season: The Enya Collection – Enya
- Spår i snön – Magnus Carlsson
- The Spirit of Christmas 2006 – compilation
- A Timeless Christmas – Israel & New Breed
- A Twisted Christmas – Twisted Sister
- Winter Carols – Blackmore's Night
- Winter Tales – Nadia Birkenstock
- Wintersong – Sarah McLachlan
- A Wish for Christmas – Hangad
- Wishing for This – Leigh Nash
- The Wonder of Christmas – Mormon Tabernacle Choir

=== 2007 ===
- All Wrapped Up in Christmas – Tracy Lawrence
- Atlas Eets Christmas – The Flaming Lips
- Chris Squire's Swiss Choir – Chris Squire
- Christmas – Kimberley Locke
- Christmas... From the Realms of Glory – Bebo Norman
- Christmas Harmony: Vision Factory Presents – compilation
- Christmas Joy (EP) – Mandisa
- Christmas Like This – Jump5
- Christmas Means Love – Joan Osborne
- A Christmas of Love – Keith Sweat
- Christmas Presence – Gloria Gaynor
- Christmas Present – Boney James
- Christmas Song – Mannheim Steamroller
- Christmas Songs – Jars of Clay
- Christmas Wish – Olivia Newton-John
- Christmas with Boney M. – Boney M.
- Christmas with Carnie – Carnie Wilson
- Christmas with The Smithereens – The Smithereens
- Christmastime in Larryland – Larry the Cable Guy
- A Classic Christmas (Toby Keith album) – Toby Keith
- Colin James & The Little Big Band: Christmas – Colin James & The Little Big Band
- A Diamond Rio Christmas: The Star Still Shines – Diamond Rio
- Disney Channel Holiday – Disney Channel artists
- The European Divas – Frostroses – compilation
- The Gift of Christmas – Juice Newton
- Hand in Hand – beFour
- A Homemade Holiday (EP) – The Verve Pipe
- I denna natt blir världen ny – Jul i Betlehem II – Carola Häggkvist
- I'll Be Home for Christmas – Isley Brothers
- In the Swing of Christmas – Barry Manilow
- It's a Wonderful Christmas – Michael W. Smith
- Jazzy Christmas – Victor Dey, Jnr
- A Jingle with Jillian – Jillian
- Just in Time for Christmas – Pam Tillis
- Let It Snow, Baby... Let It Reindeer – Relient K
- Magic of Christmas – Marie Osmond
- Memories of a Winter's Night – Dave Koz
- Miss Patti's Christmas – Patti LaBelle
- My Holiday – Mindy Smith
- Navidad a mi estilo – Victor Manuelle
- Navidad Boricua: Mi Pueblo esta de Fiesta – compilation
- Noël – Josh Groban
- One Wintry Night – Dave Phelps
- Open House (EP) – Jaci Velasquez
- Over the Rainbow – Connie Talbot
- Rockin' Around the Christmas Tree – Arvingarna
- Santa Loves to Boogie – Asleep at the Wheel
- The Secret of Christmas – Captain & Tennille
- Songs of the Season – Randy Travis
- Sounds of the Season: The KT Tunstall Holiday Collection – KT Tunstall
- The Spirit of Christmas 2007 – compilation
- Spirit of the Season – Mormon Tabernacle Choir
- Stockings by the Fire – compilation
- The Taylor Swift Holiday Collection – Taylor Swift
- Trimming the Tree – Mannheim Steamroller
- What a Wonderful Time – Yolanda Adams
- WOW Gospel Christmas – compilation

=== 2008 ===
- All Wrapped Up – compilation
- ...And a Happy New Year – The Maine
- And Winter Came... – Enya
- Anne Murray's Christmas Album – Anne Murray
- The Archies Christmas Album – Brian Setzer Orchestra
- The Best Of Collection – Christmas Rocks! – compilation
- Caroling, Caroling: Christmas with Natalie Cole – Natalie Cole
- The Christmas Collection – Amy Grant
- Christmas Duets – Elvis Presley (and various artists)
- Christmas Eve – Robi Botos Trio
- Christmas Gaither Vocal Band Style – Gaither Vocal Band
- Christmas Gift – Kokia
- Christmas with The Chipmunks – The Chipmunks
- Christmas with Weezer – Weezer
- Christmasville – Mannheim Steamroller
- Classic Christmas – Bradley Joseph
- Classic Christmas – George Strait
- Come Darkness, Come Light: Twelve Songs of Christmas – Mary Chapin Carpenter
- Connie Talbot's Christmas Album – Connie Talbot
- Country Piano Christmas – Mark Burchfield
- The Dawn of Grace – Sixpence None the Richer
- Don't Come Home for Christmas – Jeff Dunham
- En helt ny jul – Amy Diamond
- The Essential Now That's What I Call Christmas – compilation
- Evergreen – Alison Brown
- A Heavy Mental Christmas – Helix
- Holiday Spirits – Straight No Chaser
- Home for Christmas – BarlowGirl
- Home for Christmas – Sheryl Crow
- I'll Be Home for Christmas – Brian McKnight
- It's Christmas – Ledisi
- It's Christmas – Mandisa
- Jingle All the Way – Béla Fleck and the Flecktones
- Joy to the World – Faith Hill
- A Lovely Way to Spend Christmas – Kristin Chenoweth
- A Midwinter Night's Dream – Loreena McKennitt
- Music Gift – Kokia
- My Christmas Wish – Jason Yeager
- A New Thought for Christmas – Melissa Etheridge
- Ngayong Pasko – Sitti
- A Night Before Christmas – Spyro Gyra
- Nowell Nowell Nowell! – Nowell Sing We Clear
- Nu tändas tusen juleljus – Åsa Jinder
- Our Christmas – Sanna Nielsen, Shirley Clamp & Sonja Aldén
- Peace on Earth – Casting Crowns
- A pureNRG Christmas – pureNRG
- Rejoice and Be Merry! – Mormon Tabernacle Choir
- Rimfrostjul – Charlotte Perrelli
- The Singing Saw at Christmastime – Julian Koster
- Snoop Dogg Presents Christmas in tha Dogg House – Snoop Dogg
- Songs of Joy & Peace – Yo-Yo Ma
- Sounds of the Season: The Julianne Hough Holiday Collection – Julianne Hough
- The Spirit of Christmas 2008 – compilation
- Sväng jul – Lasse Stefanz
- Sweet Bells – Kate Rusby
- A Swingin' Christmas – Tony Bennett
- Tennessee Christmas: A Holiday Collection – compilation
- This Christmas, Aretha – Aretha Franklin
- This Time of Year EP – Project 86
- This Warm December – Zach Gill and Jack Johnson
- A Tribute to Bad Santa Starring Mike Epps – Jim Jones and the Skull Gang
- The Ultimate Gift – Rahsaan Patterson
- Una Navidad con Gilberto – Gilberto Santa Rosa
- Verve Remixed Christmas – compilation
- A Very Rosie Christmas – Rosie Thomas
- We Wish You a Metal Xmas and a Headbanging New Year – compilation
- What a Night! A Christmas Album – Harry Connick Jr.
- A Winter Symphony – Sarah Brightman
- Winterwunderland – Schnuffel
- Wishing You a Rave Christmas – The Raveonettes

=== 2009 ===
- Alma Mater – Pope Benedict XVI
- Avalanche Records Alternative Christmas – compilation
- A Cherry Cherry Christmas – Neil Diamond
- Christ Is Come – Big Daddy Weave
- Christmas – Johnny Reid
- Christmas 25th Anniversary Collection – compilation
- Christmas Cheers – Straight No Chaser
- Christmas from the Heart – David Archuleta
- Christmas in Bethlehem – Carola Häggkvist
- Christmas in the Heart – Bob Dylan
- Christmas Jazz Jam – Wynton Marsalis
- Christmas Like This (Ayiesha Woods album) – Ayiesha Woods
- Christmas, Thanks for Nothing – Slow Club
- Christmastide – Bob Bennett
- Christmastime (EP) – Bob Schneider
- Connie Talbot's Holiday Magic – Connie Talbot
- Dark Christmas (Abney Park album) – Abney Park
- Family Force 5's Christmas Pageant – Family Force 5
- Gift Wrapped – 20 Songs That Keep on Giving! – compilation
- Glory in the Highest: Christmas Songs of Worship – Chris Tomlin
- Gold and Green – Sugarland
- Halford III: Winter Songs – Halford
- How Many Kings: Songs for Christmas – downhere
- I'll Be Home for Christmas – Crystal Shawanda
- If on a Winter's Night... – Sting
- The Jethro Tull Christmas Album – Jethro Tull
- Jul hos mig – Lotta Engberg
- Julenatt – Elisabeth Andreasson
- Make Sure You're Home for Christmas – Joe
- Merry Christmas – Kate Ceberano
- Merry Christmas Baby – compilation
- Merry Flippin' Christmas Volumes 1 and 2 – Bowling for Soup
- Merry Xmas from X – X
- Midwinter Graces – Tori Amos
- Mr. Vocalist X'Mas – Eric Martin
- My Christmas – Andrea Bocelli
- My Kind of Christmas – Dean Martin compilation
- Not So Silent Night... Christmas with REO Speedwagon – REO Speedwagon
- Now That's What I Call a Country Christmas – compilation
- Oh Blue Christmas – A Fine Frenzy
- Ring Christmas Bells – Mormon Tabernacle Choir
- The Spirit of Christmas 2009 – compilation
- This Christmas – Michael McDonald
- Three Songs for Christmas – Rachael Lampa
- Välkommen hem – E. M. D.
- A Very Special Christmas 7 – compilation
- Winter Magic – Hayley Westenra
- Winter Songs – Ronan Keating
- Winter's Eve – Nox Arcana
- Xuxa só para Baixinhos 9 – Natal Mágico – Xuxa

== 2010s ==
=== 2010 ===
- Ah! Leluiah! – Donnie Iris
- Aled's Christmas Gift – Aled Jones
- Celtic Thunder: Christmas – Celtic Thunder
- Christmas (EP) – Jesu
- Christmas at the Grand – Jason McCoy
- Christmas Child (EP) – Carbon Leaf
- A Christmas Cornucopia – Annie Lennox
- A Christmas Gift (EP) – Kylie Minogue
- Christmas in Harmony – Wilson Phillips
- Christmas Is the Time to Say I Love You – Katharine McPhee
- Christmas Special – The Boy Least Likely To
- Christmas with Ivi Adamou – Ivi Adamou
- Christmas with The Puppini Sisters – The Puppini Sisters
- Cold December Flies Away – Ed Goldfarb
- The Complete James Brown Christmas – James Brown
- Destination... Christmas! – The Superions
- En stjärna lyser i natt – Christer Sjögren
- A Gerald Walker Christmas (EP) – Gerald Walker
- The Gift – Susan Boyle
- Gift Wrapped Vol. II – compilation
- Glee: The Music, The Christmas Album – Glee
- Grown-Up Christmas List (EP) – Jake Zyrus
- Happy Christmas – Jessica Simpson
- Happy Christmas Vol. 5 – compilation
- Have Yourself a Merry Little Christmas – Kurt Nilsen
- Holly Happy Days – Indigo Girls
- Home for the Holidays – Point of Grace
- Home Is the Essence of Christmas – Joe
- Hope for All the World (EP) – Phillips, Craig and Dean
- I år är julen min – Tommy Nilsson
- Joy to the World – Pink Martini
- A Kylie Christmas (EP) – Kylie Minogue
- Merry Christmas – Shelby Lynne
- Merry Christmas II You – Mariah Carey
- A Merry Little Christmas (EP) – Lady Antebellum
- A Merry Little Christmas – Matt Brouwer
- The Most Wonderful Time of the Year – Mormon Tabernacle Choir
- The Most Wonderful Time of the Year – Take 6
- Noël – The Priests
- Now That's What I Call Christmas! 4 – compilation
- O Holy Night – Jackie Evancho
- O Holy Night – Daniel O'Donnell
- Santa Lucia – En klassisk jul – Malena Ernman
- A Touch of Christmas – Shirley Jones
- Vår jul – Sanna Nielsen, Shirley Clamp and Sonja Aldén
- A Very Steampunk Christmas (EP) – The Men That Will Not Be Blamed For Nothing
- Winterland – Sarah Dawn Finer

=== 2011 ===
- 2011 SM Town Winter – The Warmest Gift – SMTown
- Born Is the King – Hillsong Music
- Chicago XXXIII: O Christmas Three – Chicago
- A Child Is Born – Geri Allen
- Christmas – Michael Bublé
- The Christmas EP – Hey Monday
- The Christmas EP – Richard Marx
- Christmas Favorites (EP) – Il Volo
- Christmas in Diverse City – TobyMac
- Christmas Symphony – Mannheim Steamroller
- Classic Christmas – Joe McElderry
- A Cut-Throat Christmas (EP) – Twiztid
- December: En svensk jul – Uno Svenningsson and Irma Schultz Keller
- A Dreamers Christmas – John Zorn
- A Farmhouse Christmas – Joey and Rory
- Funny Looking Angels – Smith & Burrows
- Gift Beneath the Star – Bree Noble
- A Ginuwine Christmas – Ginuwine
- Glad Christmas Tidings – Mormon Tabernacle Choir
- Glee: The Music, The Christmas Album Volume 2 – Glee
- Happy Holiday (EP) – Marcella Detroit
- The Heart of Christmas – Matthew West
- Heavenly Christmas – Jackie Evancho
- A Holiday Carole – Carole King
- It Snowed – Meaghan Smith
- It's Christmastime Again, Gerald Walker – Gerald Walker
- Kära vinter – Måns Zelmerlöw
- The Most Wonderful Time of the Year – Scott Weiland
- A New Orleans Christmas Carol – Ellis Marsalis
- Noel – Phil Vassar
- (Red) Christmas EP – The Killers
- Remember December (EP) – Doc Walker
- A Rockapella Holiday – Rockapella
- Under the Mistletoe – Justin Bieber
- Välkommen jul – Jill Johnson
- A Very She & Him Christmas – She & Him
- While Mortals Sleep – Kate Rusby
- White Christmas – Deana Martin
- WOW Christmas (2011) – compilation

=== 2012 ===
- Årets julklapp! från Mauro Scocco – Mauro Scocco
- August Burns Red Presents: Sleddin' Hill – August Burns Red
- Carols – Mike Janzen
- Cee Lo's Magic Moment – Cee Lo Green
- Celtic Woman: Silent Night – Celtic Woman
- Cheers, It's Christmas – Blake Shelton
- Christmas (EP) – Delta Goodrem
- Christmas – Francesca Battistelli
- Christmas – Kevin Kern
- Christmas Ain't About Me – The Doubleclicks
- Christmas in the Sand – Colbie Caillat
- Christmas Spirit – Richard Marx
- Christmas Tales – Alexander Rybak
- Christmas with Scotty McCreery – Scotty McCreery
- Christmas: God with Us – Jeremy Camp
- Disney Channel Holiday Playlist – Disney compilation
- Glee: The Music, The Christmas Album Volume 3 – Glee
- Holiday with You – Pernilla Wahlgren
- Holidaydream: Sounds of the Holidays, Vol. One – Polyphonic Spree
- Holidays Rule – compilation
- Home for Christmas – Celtic Woman
- Home for Christmas – Military Wives
- It's Cold Outside – The Jeffersons
- Joy – Steven Curtis Chapman
- Joy to the World – Lincoln Brewster
- Light Up the World – Steps
- Merry Christmas, Baby – Rod Stewart
- Merry Nickmas – Nickelodeon compilation
- My Gypsy Jazz Christmas – Avalon Jazz Band
- Noel – Josh Wilson
- On This Winter's Night – Lady Antebellum
- Once Upon a Christmas – Mormon Tabernacle Choir
- PTXmas – Pentatonix
- Regifted – Eleventyseven
- A Rita Coolidge Christmas – Rita Coolidge
- Silver & Gold – Sufjan Stevens
- This Christmas – John Travolta and Olivia Newton-John
- This Is Christmas – Katherine Jenkins
- Tinsel and Lights – Tracey Thorn
- Tomten har åkt hem – BAO
- Ultra-Lounge: Christmas Cocktails, Vol. 4 – compilation
- Under that Christmas Spell – Tim Halperin
- A Very Merry Perri Christmas – Christina Perri
- A Very New Found Glory Christmas – New Found Glory
- A Very Special Christmas: 25 Years Bringing Joy to the World – compilation
- Vinternatten – Sanna Nielsen
- We Have a Saviour – Hillsong Music
- What Christmas Means – Kem
- Winter's Majesty – Nox Arcana

=== 2013 ===
- The Best Man Holiday – soundtrack
- Bidding You Joy! – Nowell Sing We Clear
- Big Band Christmas in Manhattan – Tony Paglia
- Buon Natale: The Christmas Album – Il Volo
- Candlelight Christmas – Marina Prior
- The Christmas Album – Human Nature
- The Christmas Album – Richard & Adam
- A Christmas Gift to You – Johnny Reid
- Christmas in My Heart – Gretchen Wilson
- Christmas Is Here – Brandon Heath
- Christmas Kisses (EP) – Ariana Grande
- The Christmas Project – John Schlitt
- Christmas Song Book – Mina
- Christmas Songs (EP) – Bad Religion
- Christmas Symphony II – Mannheim Steamroller
- Christmas Worship – Paul Baloche
- Christmas, with Love – Leona Lewis
- A Classic Christmas (EP) – Matthew Morrison
- The Classic Christmas Album – Andy Williams
- The Classic Christmas Album – Barbra Streisand
- Dino’s Christmas – Dean Martin compilation
- Disney Holidays Unwrapped – compilation
- Duck the Halls: A Robertson Family Christmas – Robertson Family
- En gnistrande jul – Elisa
- For the Holidays – Marcella Detroit
- Glee: The Music, The Christmas Album Volume 4 – Glee
- Home for Christmas – Susan Boyle
- Home for the Holidays – Mormon Tabernacle Choir
- I decembertid – Malena Ernman
- It's Christmas Time – Judith Durham
- Jul – Loa Falkman
- The King's Gift – Trace Adkins
- Kool for the Holidays – Kool & The Gang
- Let It Snow: A Holiday Collection – Jewel
- A Mary Christmas – Mary J. Blige
- Merry Christmas – Leningrad Cowboys
- Min barndoms jul – Charlotte Perrelli
- Min jul – Jan Johansen
- Min jul – Sanna Nielsen
- Peace, Love & Light – The Choir
- Punk Goes Christmas – compilation
- Quality Street: A Seasonal Selection for All the Family – Nick Lowe
- Röda dagar – Erik Linder
- Sending You a Little Christmas – Johnny Mathis
- Silver City – Falling Up
- Snow Globe – Erasure
- The Spirit of Christmas – Pee Wee Ellis
- This Is Christmas – Anthony Callea
- Wilde Winter Songbook – Kim Wilde
- Winter Loversland – Tamar Braxton
- Wrapped in Red – Kelly Clarkson

=== 2014 ===
- 40 Christmas Classics – Andy Williams
- At Christmas – Sara Evans
- Christmas in New York – Renée Fleming
- The Christmas Song (EP) – Jamey Johnson
- Christmas Stuff – Nathan Carter
- Christmas Time Has Come – Weeping Willows
- Christmas with Nashville – Cast of Nashville
- The Classic Christmas Album – Johnny Mathis
- Di Første Jul – Tone Damli
- Driving Home for Christmas – Lee Kernaghan
- Ebonshire – Volume 2 – Joseph Vargo
- Four Hands & a Heart Christmas – Larry Carlton
- Full of Cheer – Home Free
- Happy Holidays – Magnus Carlsson
- Happy Skalidays – Reel Big Fish
- Holiday – Earth, Wind & Fire
- Holiday for Swing – Seth MacFarlane
- Holiday Wishes – Idina Menzel
- Home For Christmas – John Schneider and Tom Wopat
- Home for the Holidays – Anthony Hamilton
- Home for the Holidays – Darius Rucker
- Island Christmas – Christine Anu
- Jul i andlighetens rum – Sonja Aldén
- Let The Season In – Mormon Tabernacle Choir
- A Los Campesinos! Christmas – Los Campesinos!
- Mark Kozelek Sings Christmas Carols – Mark Kozelek
- A Merrie Christmas to You – Blue Rodeo
- Mitt julalbum – Henrik Åberg
- My Christmas – Plácido Domingo
- O Christmas Tree – Celtic Woman
- The Spirit of Christmas – Michael W. Smith
- That's Christmas to Me – Pentatonix
- Vinterland – Sarah Dawn Finer
- The Wexford Carols – Caitríona O'Leary
- When Christmas Comes – Kim Walker-Smith
- A Wonderful Christmas with Ashanti – Ashanti
- Xmas Party Album – Vengaboys

=== 2015 ===
- Adore: Christmas Songs of Worship – Chris Tomlin
- Big Band Holidays – Jazz at the Lincoln Center and Wynton Marsalis
- Braxton Family Christmas – The Braxtons
- Christmas & Chill – Ariana Grande
- Christmas Collection – The Gaither Vocal Band
- Christmas in Tahoe – Train
- Christmas Is Here – Danny Gokey
- Christmas Love Duets – Daniel Padilla
- Christmas Queens – Cast of RuPaul's Drag Race
- Christmas with Friends – India.Arie and Joe Sample
- Christmas Worship, Vol. 2 – Paul Baloche
- Christmas: A Ghostly Gathering – Midnight Syndicate
- The Classic Christmas Album – Earth, Wind & Fire
- The Classic Christmas Album – Sarah McLachlan
- Dear Santa (EP) – Girls' Generation TTS
- Ebonshire – Volume 3 – Nox Arcana
- The Frost Is All Over – Kate Rusby
- God with Us – Laura Story
- Healing Season – Mint Condition
- Home for the Holidays – Joey DeFrancesco
- It's Almost Christmas – Jon & Valerie Guerra
- Keep Christmas with You – Mormon Tabernacle Choir
- Kylie Christmas – Kylie Minogue
- The Magic of Winter – Wizards of Winter
- MercyMe, It's Christmas! – MercyMe
- Once Again It's Christmas – Kenny Rogers
- Our Christmas Wish – The Ten Tenors
- Rockin' Rudolph – The Brian Setzer Orchestra
- Slay Belles – RuPaul
- This Christmas (EP) – Jessie James Decker
- Today Is Christmas – LeAnn Rimes
- A Very Swingin' Basie Christmas! – Count Basie Orchestra
- Weihnachten – Helene Fischer
- Welcome to Our Christmas Party – Band of Merrymakers
- Winter Garden – compilation
- Winter Symphony – Jennifer Thomas

=== 2016 ===
- 12 Nights of Christmas – R. Kelly
- Behold: A Christmas Collection – Laura Daigle
- A Capitol Christmas – compilation
- Christmas Card from a Painted Lady – Kikki Danielsson
- Christmas Night – The Choir of Canterbury Cathedral
- Christmas Party – She & Him
- Christmas Queens 2 – compilation
- Christmas Together – Garth Brooks and Trisha Yearwood
- De Puerto Rico Para El Mundo – various
- Don't Waste Your Wishes – The Killers
- Drömmen om julen – Carola Häggkvist
- Ebonshire – Volume 4 – Nox Arcana
- Friends for Christmas – John Farnham and Olivia Newton-John
- Glow – Brett Eldredge
- The Greatest Gift of All – Rascal Flatts
- Hallelujah! – Mormon Tabernacle Choir
- I'll Have Another... Christmas Album – Straight No Chaser
- In Winter – Katie Melua
- It Must Be Christmas – Chris Young
- A Kenny Lattimore Christmas – Kenny Lattimore
- Kylie Christmas: Snow Queen Edition – Kylie Minogue
- Laura Xmas – Laura Pausini
- Merry Christmas Blues – Joe Bonamassa
- Merry Christmas Lil' Mama – Jeremih and Chance the Rapper
- My Kind of Christmas – Reba McEntire
- One Voice at Christmas – Aled Jones
- A Pentatonix Christmas – Pentatonix
- Simply Christmas – Leslie Odom, Jr.
- Someday at Christmas – Jackie Evancho
- Tennessee Christmas – Amy Grant
- 'Tis the SeaSon – Jimmy Buffett
- To Celebrate Christmas – Jennifer Nettles
- Upon a Winter's Night – Cara Dillon
- A Very Kacey Christmas – Kacey Musgraves
- Wonderland – Sarah McLachlan

=== 2017 ===
- A Big (Band) Swinging Christmas! – Chris McDonald Jazz Orchestra
- A Capitol Christmas, Vol. 2 – compilation
- Christmas After Midnight – Fantasia
- Christmas Back to You – Chanté Moore
- Christmas Christmas – Cheap Trick
- Christmas Everyday – Smokey Robinson
- Christmas Queens 3 – compilation
- Christmas Together – The Piano Guys
- Christmas Vol. 1 – Planetshakers
- Christmas with Elvis and the Royal Philharmonic Orchestra – Elvis and the Royal Philharmonic Orchestra
- Ebonshire – Volume 5 – Nox Arcana
- Everyday Is Christmas – Sia
- Finally It's Christmas – Hanson
- From Spirits and Ghosts – Score for a Dark Christmas
- Kaskade Christmas – Kaskade
- Let It Snow – 98 Degrees
- Merry & Happy – Twice
- O Come Little Children – Mormon Tabernacle Choir
- The Peace Project – Hillsong Worship
- Receive Our King – Meredith Andrews
- This Christmas: Winter Is Coming (EP) – Taeyeon
- Twelve Tales of Christmas – Tom Chaplin
- Warmer in the Winter – Lindsey Stirling
- WinterFolk Volume 1 – O'Hooley & Tidow
- You Make It Feel Like Christmas – Gwen Stefani

=== 2018 ===
- Baby It's Christmas – David Campbell
- Christmas Funk – Aloe Blacc
- Christmas Is Here! – Pentatonix
- Christmas Party – RuPaul
- Christmas Party – The Monkees
- Christmas Queens 4 – compilation
- Christmas Vol. 2 – Planetshakers
- Dr. Seuss’ The Grinch – soundtrack
- Ebonshire – Nox Arcana
- Happy Xmas – Eric Clapton
- Icy Colors Change – Azealia Banks
- It's the Holiday Season – Martina McBride
- A Legendary Christmas – John Legend
- The Magic of Christmas – Samantha Jade
- A Merry Little Christmas – Mormon Tabernacle Choir
- The Most Wonderful Time of the Year – Mark Vincent
- Music Inspired by Illumination & Dr. Seuss' The Grinch – Tyler, the Creator
- The Norm Lewis Christmas Album – Norm Lewis
- On This Holiday – Jessie James Decker
- Reason for the Season – Mike Love
- Songs for the Season – Ingrid Michaelson
- This Christmas Day – Jessie J
- Winter in the Air – David Archuleta

=== 2019 ===
- Angels Among Us – Mormon Tabernacle Choir
- The Best of Pentatonix Christmas – Pentatonix compilation
- Chicago XXXVII: Chicago Christmas – Chicago
- Christmas in the City – Lea Michele
- The Christmas Present – Robbie Williams
- Christmas: A Season of Love – Idina Menzel
- Dionne Warwick & The Voices of Christmas – Dionne Warwick
- It's Christmas – Planetshakers
- Jesus Is Born – Sunday Service Choir
- The Kacey Musgraves Christmas Show – Kacey Musgraves
- Llegó Navidad – Los Lobos
- The Magic of Christmas – Celtic Woman
- Merry Christmas, Darling – Timi Dakolo
- Michelle McManus' Winter Wonderland – Michelle McManus
- Sugar & Booze – Ana Gasteyer
- White Xmas Lies – Magne F

== 2020s ==
=== 2020 ===
- A Ben Rector Christmas – Ben Rector
- Chansons hivernales – Pierre Lapointe
- The Christmas Album – Leslie Odom Jr.
- Christmas Blues – Sabrina Claudio
- Christmas Is Here – Collabro
- December Baby – JoJo
- A Drummer Boy Christmas – For King & Country
- Hark! – Andrew Bird
- Hey Sis, It's Christmas! – RuPaul
- A Holly Dolly Christmas – Dolly Parton
- If the Fates Allow: A Hadestown Holiday Album – Anaïs Mitchell
- I'll Be Home for Christmas – Gabriel Latchin Trio
- It's Christmas – Planetshakers
- It's Christmas All Over – Goo Goo Dolls
- Jingle Jangle: A Christmas Journey – soundtrack
- A Kaleidoscope Christmas – Michael Falzarano
- My Gift – Carrie Underwood
- Only Santa Knows – Delta Goodrem
- Red & Silver – Divina de Campo
- A Tori Kelly Christmas – Tori Kelly
- A Very Poppy Christmas – Poppy
- A Very Trainor Christmas – Meghan Trainor
- We Need a Little Christmas – Pentatonix

=== 2021 ===
- 2021 Winter SM Town: SMCU Express – SM Town
- Christian Christmas Songs on Guitar – Steve Petrunak
- The Dream of Christmas – Gary Barlow
- Evergreen – Pentatonix
- A Family Christmas (EP) – We the Kingdom
- I Dream of Christmas – Norah Jones
- Mr. Christmas – Brett Eldredge
- Paul Kelly's Christmas Train – Paul Kelly
- The Pianoman at Christmas – Jamie Cullum
- The Season – Steve Perry
- A Very Maverick Christmas – Maverick City Music
- When Christmas Comes Around... – Kelly Clarkson

=== 2022 ===
- 2022 Winter SM Town: SMCU Palace – SM Town
- Blue Christmas – Jimmy Barnes
- Christmas with Cliff – Cliff Richard
- A Family Christmas – Andrea Bocelli
- Holidays Around the World – Pentatonix
- Merry Christmas, Love – Joss Stone
- Merry Christmas, Y'all – Thomas Rhett
- A Neil Diamond Christmas – Neil Diamond
- Not So Silent Night – Sarah Connor
- Nuestra Navidad – Myriam Hernández
- A Philly Special Christmas – The Philly Specials
- Santa Baby – Alicia Keys
- Snow Waltz – Lindsey Stirling
- Spirited – various
- A Very Backstreet Christmas – The Backstreet Boys
- Winterlicious – Debbie Gibson

=== 2023 ===
- Christmas – Cher
- Christmas with Brandy – Brandy Norwood
- Dark Christmas – Tarja
- Essential Christmas – RuPaul
- Fruitcake – Sabrina Carpenter
- The Greatest Christmas Hits – Pentatonix
- The Holdovers – soundtrack
- A Joyful Holiday – Samara Joy
- Nuestra Navidad – Myriam Hernández
- A Philly Special Christmas Special – The Philly Specials
- Trinity Ruins Christmas: The Musical – Trinity the Tuck
- We Wish You the Merriest – Seth MacFarlane and Elizabeth Gillies

=== 2024 ===
- The Christmas Record – Little Big Town
- The Gift of Love – Jennifer Hudson
- Holiday Jazz – Frosty Christmas Tunes – Orange Jazz Quartet
- Holiday Seasoning – Jimmy Fallon
- It's Officially Christmas: The Double Album – Dan + Shay
- A Philly Special Christmas Party – The Philly Specials
- Sleigher – Ben Folds
- Sounding Joy – Lea Salonga
- That Christmas – soundtrack

=== 2025 ===
- Christmas 'Round at Ours – Girls Aloud
- Christmas in Paris – Christina Aguilera
- Christmas in the City – Pentatonix
- The Greatest Gift of All – Stryper
- It's Christmas – No Angels
- Kylie Christmas (Fully Wrapped) – Kylie Minogue
- Taylor Momsen's Pretty Reckless Christmas – The Pretty Reckless
- This Is What Christmas Feels Like – Jvke and Forrest Frank
- A Very Jonas Christmas Movie – Jonas Brothers

=== 2026 ===
- Alone (Together): A Holiday Companion – Sue Foley
- Classic Christmas – Dean Martin (compilation)
- Dust the Halls Vol. 2 – Infamous Stringdusters
- Good Weather for Immaculate Conception – Alanis Morissette
- Have Your Merry Christmas with Me – Kat Edmonson
- Is This Wreath? – Angry Snowmans
- Snowed In: A Merge Records Holiday Album – compilation
- Steven’s Greetings – Steven Page
- That Spirit of Christmas – Dustin Kensrue
- A Very Band Perry Christmas (EP) – The Band Perry
- Wintry Mix (EP) – Superchunk
