= WMA =

WMA may refer to:

== Organizations ==
- Western Marble Arch, a synagogue in London
- William Morris Agency, literary and entertainment agents, now known as WME Entertainment
- World Masters Athletics, a sport governing body
- World Medical Association, an international confederation of free professional Medical Associations
- World Marketing Alliance, former name of the World Financial Group
- Warsash Maritime Academy, in Hampshire, UK
- Wilbraham & Monson Academy, a prep school in Massachusetts

== Science and technology ==
- Weighted moving average, in statistics
- Windows Media Audio, a digital audio file format created by Microsoft
- Wireless Messaging API, in Java ME MIDP

== Music ==
- "W.M.A." (Pearl Jam song)
- World Music Awards
- World Metal Alliance, a music organization
- Western Music Association, in country music

== Other uses ==
- Washington metropolitan area, Washington, D.C., and its surrounding area
- Western martial arts, the study of historical manuscripts to teach students the martial arts of Europe
- Wildlife Management Area, for the conservation of wildlife and for recreational activities involving wildlife
- Ways and means advances, a credit policy used by Reserve Bank of India
- War Measures Act, an emergency measure formerly in Canadian Parliamentary law
- Warwick Mind and Action, a research centre at the University of Warwick, UK, department of philosophy

== See also ==
- WMAS (disambiguation)
