= Nu tändas tusen juleljus (disambiguation) =

"Nu tändas tusen juleljus" is a traditional Swedish Christmas song.

Nu tändas tusen juleljus may also refer to:

- Nu tändas tusen juleljus (Anna-Lena Löfgren album), 1969
- Nu tändas tusen juleljus (Agnetha Fältskog and Linda Ulvaeus album), 1981
- Nu tändas tusen juleljus (Åsa Jinder album), 2008
