= Min barndoms jul =

Min barndoms jul may refer to:

- Min barndoms jul (Charlotte Perrelli album), 2013
- Min barndoms jul (Mia Marianne och Per Filip album), 1978

== See also ==
- Min barndoms jular, a 1987 Christmas album from Kikki Danielsson
