= Mary Had a Baby =

"Mary Had a Baby" may refer to:

- "Miss Lucy had a baby", an American schoolyard rhyme
- "Mary Had a Baby" (carol), a 19th-century American Christmas song that appears on Cyndee Peters's album En julhälsning från Cyndee
