= My Kind of Christmas =

My Kind of Christmas may refer to:

- "My Kind of Christmas" (song), a 1961 song by Johnny Mathis
- My Kind of Christmas (Mike Douglas album), 1967
- My Kind of Christmas, compilation album by Dean Martin
- My Kind of Christmas (Christina Aguilera album), 2000
- My Kind of Christmas, novel by Robyn Carr 2002
- My Kind of Christmas (Reba McEntire album), 2016
