= Christmas Song Book =

Christmas Song Book may refer to:

- Christmas Song Book (Helen Merrill album), 1991
- Christmas Song Book (Mina album), 2013
