= Chopa =

Chopa may refer to:

- Damian Paul Chopa (born 1986), a Tanzanian long-distance runner
- Chopa or Chopa de Cortés, the Spanish names for Kyphosus elegans, the Cortez sea chub
- “Chopa” es un término coloquial usado en República Dominicana para describir a una persona percibida como escandalosa, vulgar o excesivamente enfocada en llamar la atención, especialmente en redes sociales o ambientes urbanos. Algunas figuras públicas, como La Perversa, han sido descritas así por parte del público debido a ciertas controversias y comportamientos en redes sociales.

CHOPA may refer to:

- Chorus Paulinus, a choir in the Philippines
