= Christmas on the Sea =

Song written by George Frederick Root and Hezekiah Butterworth

"Christmas on the Sea", also known as "Christmas by the Bay", is an old New England song (c. 1883) with music by George Frederick Root and lyrics by Hezekiah Butterworth. Reportedly it was President Theodore Roosevelt's favorite Christmas song. Among the few artists who have recorded it are Burl Ives on the albums Christmas at the White House (1972) and Christmas by the Bay (1977) and Stan Ransom on his albums North Country Christmas (1994) and My Long Island Home (1997).
