= Christmas by the Bay =

Studio album by Burl Ives
- Released: 1977
- Genre: Holiday
- Label: United States Navy Band

Burl Ives chronology
Hugo the Hippo (1976)	Christmas by the Bay (1977)	We Americans: A Musical Journey With Burl Ives (1978)

Christmas by the Bay, recorded at the Sail Loft in the Washington Navy Yard, is Burl Ives's last original Christmas album. It includes only one new Christmas song by Ives: "The Sense of Christmas." The other songs are new performances of previously recorded songs: "Rudolph the Red-Nosed Reindeer"; "A Holly, Jolly Christmas"; "Christmas by the Bay" (cf. Christmas at the White House, 1972); "White Christmas" (cf. Have a Holly Jolly Christmas, 1966); and "The Friendly Beasts" (cf. Christmas Day in the Morning, 1952). On all of these songs he is accompanied by the United States Navy Band, conducted by Ned Muffley.

Ives had performed previously with Muffley and the Navy Band: at a Christmas concert in Washington D.C. in 1974 and at the Boy Scout Jamboree in 1977. On the basis of these encounters, Muffley invited Ives to participate in a 1977 Christmas Concert at the DAR Constitution Hall: "The weeks that followed were busy indeed as a special production, the brainchild of Master Chief Jere Wallace, entitled For the Love of Christmas, was scripted, focusing around a musical adaptation of Burl telling the story of Christmas to a group of children ... the personification of Santa Claus himself." The concert was broadcast on national television.

The album represents a different product of their collaboration that year. The genres of the songs range from folk ("The Friendly Beasts") to pop ("A Holly, Jolly Christmas"). Classic Ives songs are given a new feel by the involvement of the Sea Chanters, the official chorus of the U.S. Navy.

== Track list ==
=== Side 1 ===
Track	Song Title	Performer(s)	Writer/Arranger	Time
1.	Christmas by the Bay	Burl Ives & Sea Chanters	Traditional/J. Chattaway	2:05
2.	Winter Wonderland	Sea Chanters, Evangeline Taylor, Jessica Farrow, Heidi Hunter	F. Bernard, R. Smith/B. Kidd	2:00
3.	Rudolph the Red-Nosed Reindeer	Burl Ives & Sea Chanters	J. Marks/J. Taylor	2:10
4.	I Sing Noel	Tom VanVranken	Medley/J. Brubaker	5:59
5.	The Sense of Christmas	Burl Ives & Kids	R. Chiles, J. Wallace/R. Gingery	4:00

=== Side 2 ===
Track	Song Title	Performer(s)	Writer/Arranger	Time
1.	A Holly, Jolly Christmas	Burl Ives & Sea Chanters	J. Marks/R. Gingery	1:59
2.	Christmas Festival	The United States Navy Band	L. Anderson	6:05
3.	The Friendly Beast [sic]	Burl Ives	Traditional/Burl Ives	2:40
4.	Sleigh Ride	The United States Navy Band	L. Anderson	2:37
5.	White Christmas	Burl Ives & Sea Chanters	I. Berlin/J. Taylor	2:34
