= Judy Sings Dylan... Just Like a Woman =

Studio album by Judy Collins
- Released: 1993
- Genre: Folk-pop; folk-rock
- Length: 51:33
- Label: Geffen
- Producer: Alan Silverman; Judy Collins

Judy Collins chronology
Baby's Morningtime (1990)	Judy Sings Dylan... Just Like a Woman (1993)	Come Rejoice! A Judy Collins Christmas (1994)

Judy Sings Dylan... Just Like a Woman is the twenty-first studio album by American singer-songwriter Judy Collins, released in 1993 by Geffen Records. For this album, the singer recorded her own versions of songs by Bob Dylan.

== Critical reception ==
Professional ratings
Review scores
Source	Rating
AllMusic	2.5/5 stars
The Encyclopedia of Popular Music	2/5 stars

Pemberton Roach of AllMusic noted that the undoubtedly talented Judy Collins could not fully convey the atmosphere of Dylan's songs in her interpretations, this applies both to vocals and the interpretation of some verses. Nevertheless, the reviewer singled out "Dark Eyes" as the most elegant on the album. The reviewer of Billboard wrote: "While the sweet-voiced Collins fares less well with rock-oriented material such as 'Like a Rolling Stone,' she excels on tender, melodic numbers like 'Dark Eyes,' 'Just Like a Woman,' and the devotional 'I Believe In You'; the early '60s-vintage 'Bob Dylan's Dream' acquires a moving new resonance in Collins' reading. Largely, it's a worthy salute." Stereo Review's Alanna Nash stated that the idea of Judy Collins singing Bob Dylan songs seemed to make sense: why wouldn't one of the best voices of the folk movement of the sixties record an entire album by the main author of that generation? But within a minute of the release of this collection, it becomes quite obvious how far these two outstanding performers have diverged since they met thirty years ago.

== Track listing ==
All tracks are written by Bob Dylan.

No.	Title	Length
1.	"Like A Rolling Stone"	6:06
2.	"It's All Over Now, Baby Blue"	4:47
3.	"Simple Twist of Fate"	3:51
4.	"Sweetheart Like You"	4:30
5.	"Gotta Serve Somebody"	5:40
6.	"Dark Eyes"	4:23
7.	"Love Minus Zero/No Limit"	4:09
8.	"Just Like a Woman"	4:34
9.	"I Believe in You"	5:20
10.	"With God on Our Side"	3:58
11.	"Bob Dylan's Dream"	4:15
Total length:		51:33
