= Billboard Greatest Christmas Hits =

1989 compilation album set

Billboard Greatest Christmas Hits is a set of two Christmas-themed compilation albums released by Rhino Records in 1989, each featuring ten popular Christmas recordings from 1935 to 1983, many of which charted on the Billboard record charts. Both volumes were certified Gold by the RIAA in the U.S., with the second volume being certified Platinum.

== 1935–1954 ==
Billboard Greatest Christmas Hits (1935–1954)

Compilation album by Various artists
- Released: 1989
- Genre: Christmas music
- Label: Rhino

Professional ratings
Review scores
Source	Rating
Allmusic	5/5 stars

1. "White Christmas" — Bing Crosby (Best Sellers in Stores and Christmas singles chart #1, Hot 100 #12)
2. "Let It Snow! Let It Snow! Let It Snow!" — Vaughn Monroe (Best Sellers in Stores, Most Played by Jockeys & Most Played in Jukeboxes #1)
3. "Rudolph, the Red-Nosed Reindeer" — Gene Autry (Best Sellers in Stores, Most Played by Jockeys & Most Played by Folk Disk Jockeys #1)
4. "The Christmas Song" — King Cole Trio (Most Played by Jockeys & Most played Juke Box Race Records #3)
5. "All I Want for Christmas (Is My Two Front Teeth)" — Spike Jones & His City Slickers (Most Played by Jockeys #1)
6. "I Saw Mommy Kissing Santa Claus" — Jimmy Boyd (Best Sellers in Stores #1)
7. "Christmas Island" — Andrews Sisters & Guy Lombardo (Most Played in Jukeboxes #7)
8. "Silent Night" — Bing Crosby (Record Buying Guide #10)
9. "Here Comes Santa Claus (Down Santa Claus Lane)" — Gene Autry (Best Sellers in Stores #8)
10. "Santa Baby" — Eartha Kitt (Best Sellers in Stores #4)

=== Reception ===
Shawn Haney of Allmusic says the album is a "charming collection of golden classic Christmas favorites" that "should appeal to all ages." Featuring "everybody and everything from the Bing himself to Gene Autry's "Rudolph the Red-Nosed Reindeer" to "All I Want for Christmas," a comedic, hilarious family favorite". The album peaked at #24 on Billboard's Top Christmas Albums chart in 1991 and charted a total of 7 weeks.

== 1955–Present ==
Billboard Greatest Christmas Hits (1955–Present)

Compilation album by Various artists
- Released: 1989
- Genre: Christmas music
- Label: Rhino

Alternative cover
- Box Set Cover

Professional ratings
Review scores
Source	Rating
Allmusic	4/5 stars

1. "Jingle Bell Rock" — Bobby Helms (Top 100 Sides #6, Hot 100 #35 (in 1958), Christmas singles chart #1)
2. "Rockin' Around the Christmas Tree" — Brenda Lee (Hot 100 #14 (in 1960), Christmas singles chart #3)
3. "The Chipmunk Song" — The Chipmunks with David Seville (Hot 100 #1, Christmas singles chart #5)
4. "The Little Drummer Boy" — The Harry Simeone Chorale (Hot 100 #13, Christmas singles chart #1)
5. "Mary's Boy Child" — Harry Belafonte (Best Sellers in Stores #12, Christmas singles chart #5)
6. "Blue Christmas" — Elvis Presley (Christmas singles chart #1)
7. "Nuttin' for Christmas" — Barry Gordon (Best Sellers in Stores #6)
8. "Please Come Home for Christmas" — Charles Brown (Hot 100 #76, Best-Selling Rhythm & Blues Records #12 & Christmas singles chart #1)
9. "White Christmas" — The Drifters (Rhythm and Blues #2, Top 100 Sides #80, Hot 100 #88, Christmas singles chart #4)
10. "Grandma Got Run Over by a Reindeer" — Elmo 'n Patsy (Hot Country Singles #92 (in 1983), Christmas singles chart #1)

=== Reception ===
Allmusic critic Stewart Mason calls the album "a rather skimpy but nonetheless useful compilation of Christmas songs" and says it "wisely steers mostly clear of the annoying novelty Christmas songs of the rock era." While it does include the "horrifyingly bad 'Grandma Got Run Over By a Reindeer'," it also includes "Charles Brown's 'Please Come Home for Christmas', maybe the best R&B Christmas song ever". The album peaked at #15 on Billboard's Top Christmas Albums chart in 1991 and charted a total of 59 weeks.

== Other albums ==
Rhino Records subsequently released five other albums as Billboard Christmas hits:

=== Billboard Greatest Country Christmas Hits (1990) ===
1. "Blue Christmas" — Ernest Tubb (Most Played by Folk Disk Jockeys #1, Best Sellers in Stores #1)
2. "Christmas Carols by the Old Corral" — Tex Ritter (Most Played Juke Box Folk Records #2)
3. "Will Santy Come to Shanty Town" — Eddy Arnold (Most Played by Folk Disk Jockeys #5)
4. "Little Sandy Sleighfoot" — Jimmy Dean (Top 100 Sides #32)
5. "Jingle Bell Rock" — Bobby Helms (Hot C&W Sides #13)
6. "White Christmas" — Ernest Tubb (Most Played by Folk Disk Jockeys #7)
7. "The Little Drummer Boy" — Johnny Cash (Hot C&W Sides #24, Hot 100 #63)
8. "C-H-R-I-S-T-M-A-S" — Eddy Arnold (Best Selling Folk Records #7)
9. "I Saw Mommy Kissing Santa Claus" — Jimmy Boyd (Top Country & Western Records Most Played In Juke Boxes & Best Sellers in Stores #1)
10. "Santa Looked a Lot Like Daddy" — Buck Owens & His Buckaroos (Christmas singles chart #1)

=== Billboard Greatest R&B Christmas Hits (1990) ===
1. "Merry Christmas, Baby" — Johnny Moore's Three Blazers (Most played Juke Box Race Records #3, Christmas singles chart #2)
2. "(It's Gonna Be A) Lonely Christmas" — The Orioles (Most played Juke Box Race Records #5)
3. "Boogie Woogie Santa Claus" — Mabel Scott (Most played Juke Box Race Records #12)
4. "Let's Make Christmas Merry, Baby" — Amos Milburn (Best-Selling Retail & Most Played Juke Box Rhythm & Blues Records #3)
5. "The Little Drummer Boy" — Lou Rawls (Christmas singles chart #2)
6. "This Time of the Year" — Brook Benton (Best-Selling Rhythm & Blues Records #12, Hot 100 #66)
7. "Rudolph the Red-Nosed Reindeer" — The Cadillacs (Best-Selling Rhythm & Blues Records #11)
8. "Run Rudolph Run" — Chuck Berry (Hot 100 #69 (in 1958))
9. "Santa Claus Is Coming to Town" — The Jackson 5 (Christmas singles chart #1)
10. "Silent Night" — Sister Rosetta Tharpe (Best-Selling Retail Rhythm & Blues Records #6)

=== Billboard Rock 'n' Roll Christmas (1994) ===
1. "Thank God It's Christmas" — Queen (UK Singles chart #21)
2. "Christmas Is the Time to Say 'I Love You'" — Billy Squier (Christmas singles chart #9)
3. "Rock and Roll Christmas" — George Thorogood & the Destroyers
4. "Christmas at Ground Zero" — Weird Al Yankovic
5. "All I Want for Christmas Is You" — Foghat
6. "Run Rudolph Run" — Chuck Berry
7. "Little Saint Nick" — The Beach Boys (Christmas singles chart #3)
8. "Christmas Blues" — Canned Heat (Christmas singles chart #18)
9. "Santa Claus and His Old Lady" — Cheech & Chong (Christmas singles chart #3)

=== Billboard Presents: Family Christmas Classics (1995) ===
1. "Christmas Time Is Here" — Vince Guaraldi Trio (from A Charlie Brown Christmas soundtrack, Top Holiday Albums #2)
2. "Welcome Christmas" — Boris Karloff / MGM Studio Orchestra (from the How the Grinch Stole Christmas! TV special soundtrack, Top Holiday Albums #36)
3. "We Need a Little Christmas" — Angela Lansbury (from the Mame Original Cast recording, Top LPs #23)
4. "The Chipmunk Song (Christmas Don't Be Late)" — Alvin and the Chipmunks / David Seville
5. "Riu Chiu" — The Monkees (from The Monkees (TV series) Christmas Show)
6. "A Holly Jolly Christmas" — Burl Ives (from the Rudolph the Red-Nosed Reindeer TV special, Christmas singles chart #13)
7. "Comin' Up Christmas Time" — Yogi Bear & Friends (from Casper's First Christmas)
8. "White Christmas" — Bing Crosby (from the film Holiday Inn)
9. "Frosty the Snowman" — Jimmy Durante (from the Frosty the Snowman TV special)
10. "Have Yourself a Merry Little Christmas" — Judy Garland (from Meet Me in St. Louis)

=== Billboard Top Christmas Hymns (1995) ===
1. "Joy to the World" — Philadelphia Orchestra (from The Glorious Sound Of Christmas, Christmas album chart #17)
2. "Hark! The Herald Angels Sing" — Mormon Tabernacle Choir (from The Spirit of Christmas, Christmas album chart #26)
3. "O Holy Night" — Andy Williams (from The Andy Williams Christmas Album, Christmas album chart #1)
4. "The First Noel" — Johnny Mathis / Percy Faith & His Orchestra (from Merry Christmas (Best-Selling Pop LPs #3, Christmas album chart #2)
5. "It Came Upon a Midnight Clear/Good King Wenceslas/We Three Kings/Villancico/Hark! The Herald Angels" — Harry Simeone Chorale (from The Little Drummer Boy, Christmas album chart #1)
6. "O Come, All Ye Faithful" — Leonard Bernstein / Mormon Tabernacle Choir / New York Philharmonic (from The Joy of Christmas, Christmas album chart #8)
7. "Away in a Manger" — Julie Andrews / André Previn (from A Christmas Treasure, Christmas album chart #9)
8. "Medley: The Joys of Christmas/O Little Town Of Bethlehem/Deck The Halls/The First Noel" — Harry Belafonte (from To Wish You a Merry Christmas, Christmas album chart #40)
9. "God Rest Ye Merry, Gentlemen" — Ray Conniff & the Singers (from Here We Come A-Caroling, Christmas album chart #15)
10. "Medley: Hark! The Herald Angels Sing/O Little Town Of Bethlehem/Silent Night" — John Gary (from the John Gary Christmas Album, Christmas album chart #3)

== See also ==
- Billboard Christmas Holiday Charts
