= World Metal Alliance =

World Metal Alliance Logo

The World Metal Alliance (WMA) is a music organization founded in 1992. Its initial purpose was to inform and unite the heavy metal subculture in order to counteract opposition to heavy metal by groups such as the PMRC which were active at the time. During its first four years the World Metal Alliance operated using printed media and conventional mail. Eventually the organization would continue these efforts online with its website and forums.

== Pre-web era (1992–1996) ==
The World Metal Alliance began to recruit members in May 1992 by distributing recruitment flyers to metal fans at concerts and in local metal clubs throughout Philadelphia and South Jersey. Each person who returned a completed membership application was sent a numbered membership card and blank recruitment flyer to copy and distribute to others.

From 1992 to 1994 The World Metal Alliance published a newsletter called the Quarterly Report as a means of establishing open communication between members via conventional mail. The majority of the content was from the membership including their comments, questions, suggestions, and the results of polls they voted in. The remaining content included organization statistics, recognition of outstanding members and an occasional article to provoke discussion between members in the letters section.

The first edition of the Quarterly Report was published in the Fall of 1992. By 1994 the rising cost of postage and growing number of members made it financially impossible to continue to communicate by conventional mail. The newsletter was discontinued and the final edition of the Quarterly Report was published in 1994.

By 1996, four years after its formation, and 2 years after the last newsletter the flow of new members began to decrease. Although the World Metal Alliance continued to accept new members and remained a legally registered music organization, all other operations ceased and the WMA would remain silent for the next four years.

== Web era (1999–present) ==
In 1999, the organization began to receive requests from the membership to reactivate the WMA as a website, claiming that the technology of the web would be a perfect match for all the past functions of the organization such as the communication between members, surveys, polls and petitions.

The first World Metal Alliance website went online at the URL metal.20m.com in the Spring of 2000. The membership which had joined between 1992 and 1996 provided a pre-existing base of users giving the new site and forum immediate activity. By 2002 the World Metal Alliance website was featured as one of the Top Five Heavy Metal Sites on the web by Etcetera Web Magazine, which stated "World leaders have the UN, head-bangers have the WMA"

In 2004 the World Metal Alliance released an 18 track music CD titled "The Antichristmas Vol. 1" which was a compilation of metal Christmas song parodies and instrumentals. In 2005 the album was included in the article "Jingle Bell Schlock" by an Australian news site called The Age.

In 2005, the site was reviewed in Metal Maniacs Magazine's "Zine and Not Heard" section which stated "At first glance, this sounds like the metal version of the 'World Wildlife Foundation, and in some strange way it is as metal.20m.com (A.K.A. The World Metal Alliance) spans the globe and includes all manner of metal fans proactively talking the rock online".

The World Metal Alliance website and forum relocated from metal.20m.com and ezboard to worldmetalalliance.com in 2005, a week after ezboard was cracked on May 31, 2005. The website and forum eventually relocated again in 2007 to its current location, worldmetalalliance.org.

On January 15, 2008 The World Metal Alliance released a political satire song titled "Huck Em All" which was featured on the NPR show "Songs in the Key of Politics" on Super Tuesday, February 5, 2008. On January 27, 2008 The World Metal Alliance released a music video of the song also titled "Huck Em All", which was featured in PrezVid.com's article "Song And Dance Men", which called the World Metal Alliance "headbangers central". The video was also featured on The Daily Tube, Technorati and MyBroadband.co.za NEWS.

== See also ==
- Heavy metal music
- The Antichristmas Vol. 1
