= Born Is the King =

EP by Hillsong Church
- Released: 2011
- Genre: Contemporary Christian, Christmas music
- Label: Hillsong Music Australia

Hillsong Music Australia Christmas albums chronology
Celebrating Christmas (2005)	Born Is the King (2011)	We Have A Saviour (2012)

Born Is the King is the third Christmas worship album of Christian Contemporary music composed of Christmas music led by the Hillsong Church. The album includes two original songs composed by Hillsong as well as a selection of traditional Christmas Carols featuring Darlene Zschech, Matt Crocker, and other members of the Hillsong Team.

== Track listing ==
Album release
No.	Title	Lead Vocals	Length
1.	"The Westward Procession" (Instrumental)		0:32
2.	"Joy to the World"	Jill McCloghry	3:20
3.	"Born Is the King (It's Christmas)"	Matt Crocker	3:21
4.	"Emmanuel"	Darlene Zschech	4:35
5.	"We Three Kings"	Nathan Finochio	2:56
6.	"O Come Let Us Adore Him"	Annie Garratt	6:25
7.	"O Holy Night"	Dave Ware	6:03
8.	"Silent Night"	Hayley Law	2:07

== Musicians ==
Lead Vocals:

- Darlene Zschech
- Matt Crocker
- Annie Garratt
- Jill McCloghry
- Dave Ware
- Hayley Law
- Nathan Finochio

Senior Pastors of Hillsong Church:

- Brian & Bobbie Houston

== Critical reception ==
Louder Than the Music, a website dedicated to Christian music, wrote in its review Born Is the King is "eight tracks long but in those eight tracks you know Christmas is here" and gave a 4.5 stars out of 5. Ryan Barbee of American website Jesus Freak Hideout gave the album 3.5 stars out of 5, commenting "it does have something to offer this holiday season, but the downside is that it's only eight tracks long and doesn't have the classic American holiday feel." He found the band rendered the traditional songs beautifully but described original song "Born Is The King" as "the antithesis of a 'White Christmas'" as it has "a very island-tropical melody with childlike fun".

== Charts ==
Chart (2011)	Peak position
ARIA Albums Chart	55
ARIA Top 20 Australian Albums Chart	14
