= Come Rejoice! A Judy Collins Christmas =

Studio album by Judy Collins
- Released: September 20, 1994
- Genre: Christmas; folk
- Length: 46:17
- Label: Mesa
- Producer: Alan Silverman; Judy Collins

Judy Collins chronology
Judy Sings Dylan... Just Like a Woman (1993)	Come Rejoice! A Judy Collins Christmas (1994)	Live at Newport (1994)

Come Rejoice! A Judy Collins Christmas is the twenty-second studio and Christmas album by American singer-songwriter Judy Collins, released on September 20, 1994, by Mesa Recordings.

== Overview ==
In fact, this is the first Christmas album in Collins' career, if you do not take into account 1985 album Amazing Grace, which, although released in the midst of the Christmas season with the appropriate design and title, had little of the Christmas mood.

Collins recorded this album with minimal accompaniment, among which mainly only the piano, you can also hear a synthesizer, guitar, as well as a choir. Among the tracks selected for the album are mainly Christian hymns, but there are also popular Christmas songs like "I'll Be Home for Christmas" or "Let It Snow". The album also includes a song by the author "Song for Sarajevo" telling about the horrors of the war in Bosnia. The last track on the album was the re-recorded classic "Amazing Grace."

== Critical reception ==
Professional ratings
Review scores
Source	Rating
AllMusic	4/5 stars
The Encyclopedia of Popular Music	3/5 stars

Steve Baltin from Cash Box wrote: "Collins' contribution to the glut of Christmas recordings definitely takes the prize for most serious, as it includes original numbers like 'Song for Sarajevo.' In addition, the arrangements are almost eerily sparse, with a bit of spoken word from the Bible thrown in on 'Away in a Manger.' This record is a must for fans of Collins, especially given how infrequently she returns to the scene, but it's not likely to convert any new fans."

== Track listing ==
No.	Title	Writer(s)	Length
1.	"I'll Be Home for Christmas"	Kim Gannon; Walter Kent; Buck Ram	1:06
2.	"Away in a Manger"	Traditional	4:21
3.	"Joy to the World"	Lowell Mason; Isaac Watts	2:32
4.	"Song for Sarajevo"	Judy Collins	4:44
5.	"Cherry Tree Carol"	Traditional	4:28
6.	"Good King Wenceslas"	Traditional	3:18
7.	"All on a Wintry Night"	Collins	3:28
8.	"Come Rejoice"	Collins	3:32
9.	"Little Road to Bethlehem"	Mick Head; Margaret Rose	2:35
10.	"Silent Night"	Franz Xaver Gruber; Joseph Mohr	4:05
11.	"A Christmas Carol"	Ned Rorem	1:31
12.	"Charlie & The Bells Medley: White Christmas / Happy New Year"	Irving Berlin; Chuck Collins	3:40
13.	"Let It Snow"	Sammy Cahn; Jule Styne	3:09
14.	"Amazing Grace"	John Newton	3:48
Total length:			46:17
