= Min barndoms jul (Mia Marianne och Per Filip album) =

Studio album by Mia Marianne och Per Filip
- Released: 1978
- Genre: Christmas
- Label: Mariana

Min barndoms jul is a 1978 Mia Marianne och Per Filip Christmas album.

== Track listing ==
1. När juldagsmorgon glimmar (trad.)
2. Det är en ros utsprungen (Es ist ein Ros entsprungen) – (trad.)
3. O kom alla trogna (Adeste Fideles) – (John Francis Wade)
4. Min barndoms jul – (K E Filip Olsson, Emil Hagström)
5. Afton i advent – (K E Filip Olsson, Emil Hagström)
6. O helga natt (Cantique de Noël) (Adolphe Adam)
7. Mariae Wiegenlied (op 76:52) (Maria går i rosengård) – Max Reger
8. Stilla natt (Stille Nacht, Heilige Nacht) – Franz Gruber
9. Julvisa (op 1:4) (Stille Nacht, Heilige Nacht) – Zacharias Topelius, Jean Sibelius
10. Kanske det är natt hos dig – Per Filip, Bo Setterlind
11. Betlehems stjärna (Gläns över sjö och strand) – Alice Tegnér, Viktor Rydberg
12. Psaltarpsalm, nr 24 (Davids psalm, nr 24) (Gören portarna höga) / G. Wennerberg

== Charts ==
Chart (1978)	Peak position
Sweden (Sverigetopplistan)	32
