= Christmas Variations =

Studio album by Rick Wakeman
- Released: 2000
- Recorded: 2000
- Genre: Progressive rock Christmas music
- Length: 49:44
- Label: Music Fusion
- Producer: Rick Wakeman

Rick Wakeman chronology
Chronicles of Man (2000)	Christmas Variations (2000)	Rick Wakeman Live in Concert 2000 CD (2000)

Christmas Variations is a studio album by Rick Wakeman.

== Track listing ==
1. "Silent Night" – 4:35
2. "Hark The Herald Angels Sing" – 6:19
3. "Christians Awake, Salute The Happy Morn" – 7:02
4. "Away In A Manger" – 5:28
5. "While Shepherds Watch Their Flocks By Night" – 5:33
6. "O Little Town of Bethlehem" – 6:06
7. "Once In Royal David's City" – 4:58
8. "O Come All Ye Faithful" – 5:16
9. "Angels From The Realms of Glory" – 4:27
