= Twelve Girls of Christmas =

Studio album by Twelve Girls Band
- Released: November 2, 2005 (JPN)

Twelve Girls Band chronology
The Best of Covers (2005)	Twelve Girls of Christmas (2005)	The Best of Twelve Girls Band (2006)

Merry Christmas to You, also known as Twelve Girls of Christmas, is an album by Twelve Girls Band. It consists of twelve tracks in a sort of modernized Chinese form. It was released in 2005, and is considered as a Christmas album, in which they cover well-known Christmas songs.

== Track listing ==
=== English release ===
1. "Joy to the World"
2. "The First Noel"
3. "Christmas Eve"
4. "All I Want for Christmas Is You"
5. "Silent Night"
6. "White Christmas"
7. "Koibito ga Santa Claus"
8. "Santa Claus Is Comin' to Town"
9. "Jingle Bells"
10. "Shiroi Koibito Tachi"
11. "Last Christmas"
12. "Happy Xmas (War Is Over)"

=== Japanese release ===
1. "Morobito Kozorite"
2. "Christmas Eve"
3. "Koibitotachi no Christmas"
4. "Kiyoshi kono Yoru"
5. "White Christmas"
6. "Koibito ga Santa Claus"
7. "Santa ga Machi ni Yattekuru"
8. "Jingle Bells"
9. "Shiroi Koibito Tachi"
10. "Last Christmas"
11. "Hajimete no Christmas"
12. "Happy Christmas (War Is Over)"
