= The Many Moods of Christmas =

Studio album by Robert Shaw Chorale
- Released: 1963
- Length: 47:11
- Label: RCA Victor Red Seal

The Many Moods of Christmas is 1963 LP of eighteen Christmas carols conducted by Robert Shaw, grouped into four suites. The carols were arranged for chorus and orchestra by famed Broadway orchestrator Robert Russell Bennett.

The following is a listing of the suites and the music that each suite contains:

Suite One

Good Christian Men, Rejoice — Silent Night — Patapan — O Come, All Ye Faithful

Suite Two

O Sanctissima — Joy to the World — Away in a Manger — Fum Fum Fum — March of the Kings

Suite Three

What Child is This? — Hark! the Herald Angels Sing — Bring a Torch, Jeanette, Isabella - Angels We Have Heard on High

Suite Four

Break Forth, O Beauteous, Heav’nly Light - The First Nowell — O Little Town of Bethlehem - I Saw Three Ships - Deck the Halls with Boughs of Holly

As with most stereo albums made before 1967, the original version, performed by the Robert Shaw Chorale and RCA Victor Symphony, was released by RCA Victor in both mono and stereo. The album was a great success, with first-year sales exceeding 100,000 units, even as the then-recent assassination of President John F. Kennedy, which had occurred on November 22, 1963, cast a pall over Christmas for many Americans that year. The album peaked at #11 on Billboard's Christmas Records chart December 28, 1963.

In 1971, chorus/piano octavos were published by Lawson-Gould. Orchestral score and parts are now rented by European American Music.

In 1983, two years after Robert Russell Bennett's death, Shaw recorded a somewhat revised digital stereo version of The Many Moods of Christmas, with the Atlanta Symphony Orchestra and Chorus, released that December by Telarc. It was the first of three Christmas albums that Robert Shaw recorded for Telarc. While the first version of The Many Moods of Christmas had been made with rather close miking in a recording studio, the newer version was recorded in the more spacious environment of Atlanta Symphony Hall in the Woodruff Arts Center, resulting in a recording with more reverberation than the first.

The Shaw/Atlanta recording remains a popular seller, and had eclipsed the out-of-print 1963 version before the latter's digital release on a 1997 CD. Both versions are now best sellers.
