= The 4 Seasons Greetings =

Studio album by The Four Seasons
- Released: 1962
- Genre: Christmas
- Length: 34:42
- Label: Vee-Jay
- Producer: Bob Crewe

The Four Seasons chronology
Sherry & 11 Others (1962)	The 4 Seasons Greetings (1962)	Big Girls Don't Cry and 12 Others (1963)

The 4 Seasons Greetings is the second studio album by The Four Seasons. It was released in 1962 on Vee-Jay Records as a monophonic recording and later again the same year in stereo. The album charted for 6 weeks on Billboard's Best Bets For Christmas album chart peaking at #28 on December 18, 1965.

Side one features traditional carols, while the second side contains their contemporary, rock and pop flourishes. Lead singer Frankie Valli recalled in 2023 that the album was recorded within the span of one evening and finished up the next morning, before the band was set to appear at the Apollo Theater with the Ike & Tina Turner Revue. The album was initially reissued in 1966 on Philips Records with a new title, The 4 Seasons' Christmas Album, and different cover artwork, and again, on Curb Records in 2002.

== Track listing ==
Side one
No.	Title	Writer(s)	Length
1.	"Merry Christmas Melody" ("We Wish You a Merry Christmas", "Angels from the Realms of Glory", "Hark! The Herald Angels Sing", "It Came Upon the Midnight Clear")	James Montgomery; Charles Wesley; Edmund Sears	4:46
2.	"What Child Is This?"	William Chatterton Dix	2:36
3.	"Carol of the Bells"	Mykola Leontovych; Peter Wilhousky	2:33
4.	"The Excelsis Deo Medley" ("Deck the Halls", "Excelsis Deo", "O Come, All Ye Faithful")	Thomas Oliphant	2:21
5.	"The Little Drummer Boy"	Harry Simeone; Katherine Kennicott Davis; Henry Onorati	2:21
6.	"The First Christmas Night Medley" ("Silent Night", "O Holy Night", "The First Noel")	Franz Xaver Gruber; Joseph Mohr; Adolphe Adam; Placide Cappeau	4:58
7.	"Joy to the World Medley" ("God Rest You Merry, Gentlemen", "Away in a Manger", "Joy to the World")	Isaac Watts	1:45

Side two
No.	Title	Writer(s)	Length
1.	"Santa Claus Is Comin' to Town"	John Frederick Coots; Haven Gillespie	1:45
2.	"Christmas Tears"	Sid Bass; Bob Crewe	2:43
3.	"I Saw Mommy Kissing Santa Claus"	Tommie Connor	2:08
4.	"The Christmas Song"	Robert Wells; Mel Tormé	2:17
5.	"Jungle Bells"	Bass	2:47
6.	"White Christmas"	Irving Berlin	2:17

== Personnel ==
- Frankie Valli – vocals
- Nick Massi – bass guitar, vocal arrangements, vocals
- Bob Gaudio – keyboards, piano, vocals
- Tommy DeVito – lead guitar, vocals
