= We Have a Saviour =

Studio album by Hillsong Church
- Released: 9 October 2012
- Genre: Worship, Christmas
- Label: Hillsong Music Australia

Hillsong Music Australia Christmas albums chronology
Born Is the King (2011)	We Have a Saviour (2012)	The Peace Project (2017)

We Have a Saviour is the fourth Christmas worship album from Hillsong Music, which was issued in October 2012. The album appeared on the Billboard Top Christian Albums at No. 23 and Top Holiday Albums charts at No. 42. It also peaked in the Top 100 on the ARIA Albums Chart at No. 82; at No.68 on the ARIA Top 100 Physical Albums chart in December 2012; and returned to the charts in December 2014 to peak at No. 36 on the ARIA Catalogue Albums chart. We Have a Saviour by Hillsong is a collection of songs recorded over 2011 and 2012 with two new tracks, "We Have a Saviour" and "Our King Has Come"; it includes, "Born Is the King", and rearrangements of "O Holy Night" and "Joy to the World".

Amazon.com's editorial review observed "[it's] an album full of inspiring and festive songs soon to become Christmas classics. The seasons may be flipped with December falling in the middle of summer for Australia and there may not be snow, sleigh rides or chestnuts roasting by an open fire, but there is a common love for a baby born in a manger over 2,000 years ago." Hope 103.2's Stephen O'Doherty interviewed Hillsong members, Ben Fielding, Autumn Hardman and Dave Ware, on his show, Open House, in November 2012 to discuss the album. Timothy Yap of BreatheCast opined "[they] have brilliantly taken some of the best known traditional carols and tagged them with newly written material making them less archaic and fresher on younger ears... this is a folky, country-tinged, understated and sometimes even eclectic effort." Jono Davies of Louder Than the Music rated it at four-out-of-five stars and explained, "jammed packed with well known Christmas tunes and some original ones too... [they] have tried to make so many tracks on the album sound uber cool, which means some traditional songs don't sound as Christmasy as you might expect."

== Track listing ==
Tracks 1–5 were previously released on the extended play, Born Is the King.

No.	Title	Writer(s)	Lead Vocal	Length
1.	"O Come Let Us Adore Him"	John Francis Wade, Frederick Oakeley, Matt Crocker, Autumn Hardman, Ryan Taubert	Annie Garratt, Matt Crocker	6:25
2.	"Joy to the World"	Isaac Watts, Lowell Mason	Jill McCloghry	3:19
3.	"Born Is the King (It's Christmas)"	Crocker, Scott Ligertwood	Matt Crocker	3:21
4.	"Emmanuel"	Reuben Morgan	Darlene Zschech	4:33
5.	"O Holy Night"	Adolphe Adam, Placide Cappeau, John Sullivan Dwight	Dave Ware	6:04
6.	"We Have a Saviour"	Morgan, Ben Glover	Reuben Morgan	3:53
7.	"Hark! The Herald Angels Sing"	Charles Wesley, George Whitefield, Felix Mendelssohn, William H. Cummings	Annie Garratt	4:02
8.	"God Rest Ye Merry Gentlemen (Tidings)"	Traditional	Jonathon Douglass	3:30
9.	"Unto Us"	Morgan, Ben Fielding	Tarryn Stokes	3:54
10.	"Gloria (Angels We Have Heard on High)"	James Chadwick, Edward Shippen Barnes	Dave Ware, Hayley Law	4:07
11.	"Our King Has Come"	Hardman, Ligertwood, Harrison Wood	Dave Ware	4:25
12.	"The First Noel (Holy Is the Lord)"	Traditional, Hardman, Ligertwood, Wood	Jad Gillies	4:40
Total length:				52:13
