= The Antichristmas Vol. 1 =

Compilation album by World Metal Alliance
- Released: 7 December 2004
- Recorded: 2004
- Genre: Heavy metal
- Length: 51:18
- Label: World Metal Alliance

WMA Xmas Metal Vol. 1
- Re-release album art

The Antichristmas Volume 1 is a compilation album of metal Christmas song parodies and instrumentals by members of the World Metal Alliance, released to the public via Cafepress on 7 December 2004. The album was re-released the following year as WMA Xmas Metal Volume 1 for several reasons, primarily for search engine optimization.

In 2005 the album was included in the article "Jingle Bell Schlock" by the Australian newspaper The Age.

== Track listing ==
1. "Of None Effect" — 0:56
2. "Dark Tradition In Full Swing" — 3:56
3. "Beware" — 2:24
4. "Spoiled Children Watch The Sky" — 3:18
5. "With The Axe" — 1:16
6. "O Dead Pine Tree" — 2:49
7. "A Book That Is Sealed" — 1:15
8. "Check The Balls' — 2:00
9. "Turned Unto Fables" — 0:23
10. "Some Red Clad Bearded Rental Men" — 4:43
11. "Seven Vials Of Wrath" — 3:36
12. "Woe To The World" — 3:46
13. "Hark! The Herald Angels Sing" — 3:28
14. "Angels We Have Heard On High" — 4:04
15. "O Christmas Tree" — 3:00
16. "Deck The Halls" — 2:00
17. "God Rest Ye Merry Gentlemen" — 4:43
18. "Joy To The World" — 3:46

== Personnel ==
- DarkOverlord — keyboard/vocals
- Minister — guitar/vocals
- TSAC — bass

== See also ==
- World Metal Alliance
