= WMAS =

WMAS may refer to:

- WHLL, a radio station (1450 AM) licensed to Springfield, Massachusetts, United States, which used the callsign WMAS until April 2009
- WMAS-FM, a radio station (94.7 FM) licensed to Springfield, Massachusetts, United States
- West Midlands Ambulance Service, NHS Ambulance Trust in England
