= The Gift of Christmas (Juice Newton album) =

Studio album by Juice Newton
- Released: November 14, 2007
- Recorded: July 2007
- Genre: Christmas, country pop
- Length: 37:39 (original release); 50:49 (deluxe edition)
- Label: OJM Records

Juice Newton chronology
Country Classics (2002)	The Gift of Christmas (2007)	Duets: Friends & Memories (2010)

The Gift of Christmas is a 2007 Christmas album by country pop singer Juice Newton. It was originally released by OJM Records on November 14, 2007. The album was Newton's last collaboration with Otha Young, her professional partner of over 30 years. Young died of cancer in 2009.

== Overview ==
The Gift of Christmas was produced by Newton herself and recorded at a studio in La Cañada Flintridge, near Los Angeles, California. Among the 12 songs Newton recorded on the album were the old spiritual "Go Tell It on the Mountain", the English Christmas carol "The First Noel", and "Auld Lang Syne" from the poem by Robert Burns. She also performed the popular 1957 Bobby Helms tune "Jingle Bell Rock", the 1947 Leroy Anderson classic "Sleigh Ride", and Harry Belafonte's "Mary's Boy Child". One of the songs, "For Believers", was written by Otha Young and originally recorded by Newton for her 1983 album Dirty Looks. For this album Newton performed a special new rendition.

In discussing the album Newton remarked:

We didn't want the Christmas album to be melancholy, but we didn't want it to be all traditional either. It's Americana. I was a pop artist when I first started. I didn't cross over to country until my second album. That's why I think this album has a diverse feel to it. It's very eclectic. I love this Christmas record. It's cool for me. This is something I never could have done on a record label. Christmas albums aren't platinum or even gold sellers. Well, maybe after a while they are. But they don't debut at No. 1. So we went in and had a lot of fun with this record. And I think it shows.

I'm a singer; I learned that your voice mellows with time. You don't usually stay a tenor if you're a man. My voice has darkened; it has more depth. And I figure when it quits, I'll quit. I don't like that fake-y thing. As long as it holds up, I'll keep performing.

Newton did not have a major distributor at the time of the album's release so she sold it through her web site, her Myspace site and through CD Baby. The Gift of Christmas was subsequently released through iTunes in a "deluxe edition" with four additional songs. Two of these are non-Christmas songs with Newton singing duets with Willie Nelson. These two duets were originally released on Newton's 2010 album Duets: Friends & Memories.

== Track listing ==
=== Original release ===
No.	Title	Writer(s)	Length
1.	"Go Tell It On the Mountain"	John Wesley Work, Jr.	3:21
2.	"Jingle Bell Rock"	Joseph Carleton Beal, James Ross Boothe	3:16
3.	"The First Noel"	Traditional	3:31
4.	"Christmas Needs Love to Be Christmas"	Steven McClintock, Tim James	2:57
5.	"Sleigh Ride"	Leroy Anderson	3:03
6.	"Santa Can Dance"	Andre O. Mayeux, Otha Young	3:40
7.	"For Believers"	Otha Young	3:28
8.	"Mary's Boy Child"	Jester Hairston	3:38
9.	"Shining Star"	Andre O. Mayeux, Otha Young	4:16
10.	"Better Get Ready"	Otha Young, Juice Newton	2:25
11.	"Christmas Wish"	Otha Young, Juice Newton	4:02
12.	"Auld Lang Syne"	Robert Burns	3:23

=== Deluxe edition ===
No.	Title	Writer(s)	Length
1.	"We All Go Home for Christmas"	Andre O. Mayeux	3:21
2.	"Holidays Are Near"	Andre O. Mayeux	3:00
3.	"Go Tell It On the Mountain"	John Wesley Work, Jr.	3:21
4.	"Jingle Bell Rock"	Joseph Carleton Beal, James Ross Boothe	3:16
5.	"The First Noel"	Traditional	3:31
6.	"Christmas Needs Love to Be Christmas"	Steven McClintock, Tim James	2:57
7.	"Sleigh Ride"	Leroy Anderson	3:03
8.	"Santa Can Dance"	Andre O. Mayeux, Otha Young	3:40
9.	"For Believers"	Otha Young	3:28
10.	"Mary's Boy Child"	Jester Hairston	3:38
11.	"Shining Star"	Andre O. Mayeux, Otha Young	4:16
12.	"Better Get Ready"	Otha Young, Juice Newton	2:25
13.	"Christmas Wish"	Otha Young, Juice Newton	4:02
14.	"Auld Lang Syne"	Robert Burns	3:23
15.	"Funny How Time Slips Away" (duet with Willie Nelson)	Willie Nelson	3:34
16.	"Touch Me" (duet with Willie Nelson)	Willie Nelson	3:15
