= Mia Marianne and Per Filip =

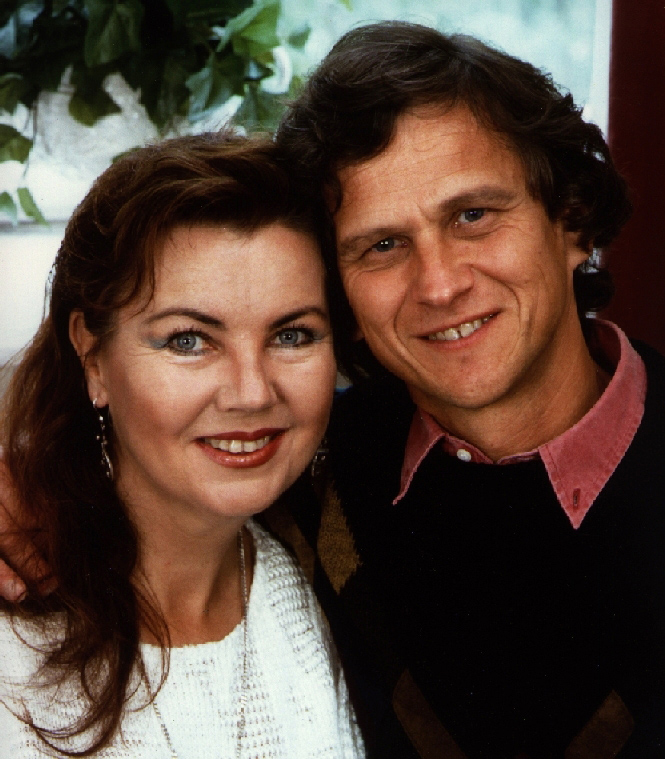
- Mia Marianne and Per Filip

Background information
- Genres: Christian songs
- Years active: 1960s–

Mia Marianne and Per Filip is a Swedish Christian music duo consisting of Mia Marianne Waldenstad and Per Filip Waldenstad. They have scored album chart successes in Sweden.
