= Christmas Song Book (Helen Merrill album) =

Studio album by Helen Merrill
- Released: 1991
- Producer: Torrie Zito

Christmas Song Book is a 1991 album by Helen Merrill with arrangements by Torrie Zito.

== Track listing ==
1. "O Christmas Tree" (Alan Merrill / traditional)
2. "Let It Snow! Let It Snow! Let It Snow!" (Sammy Cahn, Jule Styne)
3. "Nature Boy" (Eden Ahbez)
4. "Silent Night" (Franz Gruber, Joseph Mohr)
5. "Christmas Lullaby" (Alan Merrill, Torrie Zito)
6. "Winter Wonderland" (Felix Bernard, Dick Smith)
7. "Snowfall" (Claude Thornhill)
8. "The Christmas Song" (Mel Tormé, Robert Wells)
9. "Coventry Carol" (Traditional)
10. "A Child Is Born" (Thad Jones)
11. "Away in a Manger" (Traditional)
12. "White Christmas" (Irving Berlin)
13. "If I Were a Bell" (Frank Loesser)
14. "Have Yourself a Merry Little Christmas" (Ralph Blane, Hugh Martin)
