= Nu tändas tusen juleljus (Åsa Jinder album) =

Studio album by Åsa Jinder
- Released: 2008
- Genre: Christmas, folk
- Length: 41 minutes
- Label: Harpun

Åsa Jinder chronology
En samling av Åsa Jinder (2007)	Nu tändas tusen juleljus (2008)

Nu tändas tusen juleljus is a 2008 Christmas album by Åsa Jinder.

== Track listing ==
1. Betlehems stjärna (Alice Tegnér)
2. Nu tändas tusen juleljus (Emmy Köhler)
3. Laudate Dominum (Wolfgang Amadeus Mozart)
4. I himmelen (trad.)
5. När det lider mot jul (Det strålar en stjärna) (Ruben Liljefors)
6. Bereden väg för Herran (Frans Michael Franzén)
7. Dagen är kommen (Adeste Fideles) (John Francis Wade)
8. Maria går i rosengård (Max Reger)
9. Away in a Manger (William J. Kirkpatrick, arr. Lennart Sjöholm)
10. Julvisa (Jean Sibelius)
11. Jul, jul, strålande jul (Gustaf Nordqvist)
12. Stilla natt (Stille Nacht, heilige Nacht) (Franz Gruber)

== Contributors ==
- Åsa Jinder - nyckelharpa, arranger, producer
- Nicke Widén - dobro
- Emil Skogh - double-bass
