= Nu tändas tusen juleljus (Anna-Lena Löfgren album) =

Studio album by Anna-Lena Löfgren
- Released: November 1972
- Genre: Christmas, schlager
- Length: 35 minutes
- Label: Metronome

Anna-Lena Löfgren chronology
Som en sång (1972)	Nu tändas tusen juleljus (1972)	Ovan där (1973)

Nu tändas tusen juleljus is a 1972 Anna-Lena Löfgren Christmas album.

== Track listing ==
=== Sida A ===
1. Nu tändas tusen juleljus (Emmy Köhler)
2. Juletid, välkommen hit
3. Han håller världen i sin hand
4. Ett under har skett
  1. Kommen i herdar
  2. I julegranen ljusen brinner
5. O du saliga, o du heliga (O Sanctissima)
6. Blott en dag, ett ögonblick i sänder

=== Side B ===
1. Klockorna sång
2. Ave Maria
3. Kling klocka, klinge-linge-ling
4. En ton från himlen
5. Ovan där
6. Dotter Sion, fröjda dig
