= En julhälsning från Cyndee =

Studio album by Cyndee Peters
- Released: 1986
- Genre: Christmas, gospel
- Label: Little Big Apple (1986); Mariann (1991)

Cyndee Peters chronology
Gospel Meets Jazz (1981)	En julhälsning från Cyndee (1986)	När morgonstjärnan brinner (1987)

En julhälsning från Cyndee is a 1986 Cyndee Peters Christmas album. In 1991, the album was re-released on CD.

== Track listing ==
1. Hosianna (Adventshymn) - Georg Joseph Vogler
2. Dotter Sion (Judas maccabaeus) - Georg Friedrich Händel
3. Marias vaggsång (Maria går i rosengård) - Max Reger, Evelyn Lindström
4. Jul i gamla sta'n (Billy Butt, Monica Forsberg)
5. Jul, jul, strålande jul - Gustav Nordqvist, Edvard Evers
6. Vägen till en vän (That's What Friends Are For) - Burt Bacharach, Carole Bayer Sager, Ingela Forsman
7. O Holy Night (Cantique de Noel) - Adolphe Adam
8. Children Go Where I Send Thee (trad.)
9. Silent Night (Stille Nacht, Heilige Nacht) - Franz Gruber
10. O Come All Ye Faithful (Adeste fideles) - John Francis, Frederick Oakeley
11. One Day, One Peace, One Love - Eric Bibb
12. Soon and Very Soon - Andraé Crouch
13. Mary Had a Baby - negro spiritual

== Charts ==
Chart (1987)	Peak position
Sweden	37
