= Chorus Paulinus =

Choir in the Philippines

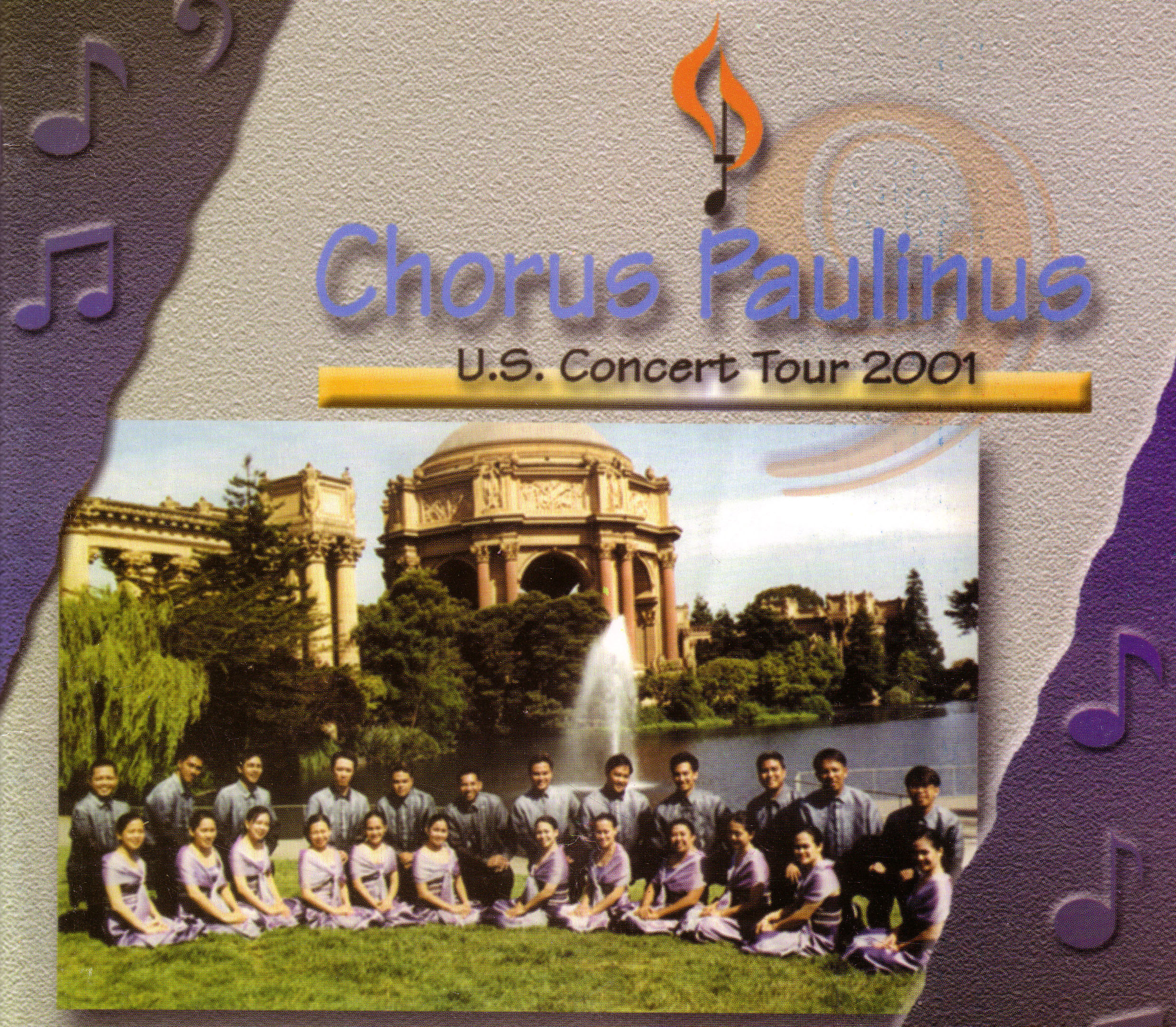
- The Chorus Paulinus U.S. Concert Tour in 2001

Background information
- Origin: Quezon City, Philippines
- Genres: Classical; Religious; Pop; Jazz
- Years active: 1992–present
- Website: Chorus Paulinus

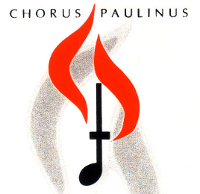

The Chorus Paulinus or CHOPA is a choir in the Philippines. It is known for its a cappella-style blending of voices that creates a sound reflective of its high choral standards.

== Founder ==
Arnold Zamora (born February 10, 1961) is a Filipino musician from Tagbilaran City, Bohol, Philippines l, who has carved for himself a name in the national music industry as a singer, composer, arranger and conductor. As a seminarian at the UST Central seminary, he founded the Psalterion Choir. At the University of the Philippines, he joined the Philippine Madrigal Singers or MADZ and is the founder of the Chorus Paulinus. He is also the founder and music director of the Singing Priests of Tagbilaran.

He currently works for the Archdiocese of San Francisco in San Francisco, California, United States.

== Discography ==
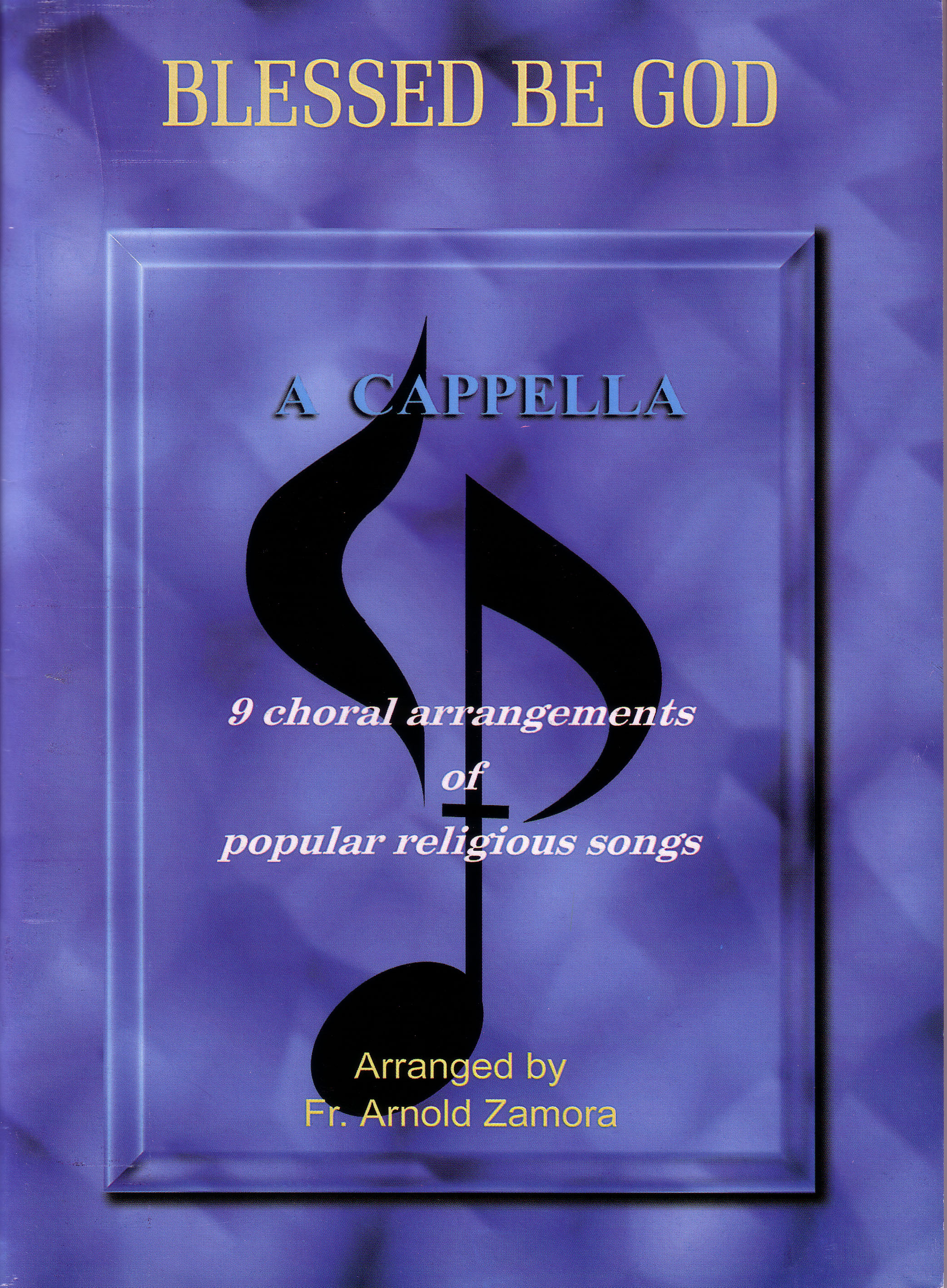
Book cover of Blessed Be God, A Cappella of the Chorus Paulinus

=== Albums ===
- Chorus Paulinus (SLO), San Luis Obispo, California, May 27, 2001
- Blessed Be God, A Cappella, nine choral arrangements of popular religious songs, arranged by Arnold Zamora, Chorus Paulinus, 1999
- Joy of Christmas, an album released in the United States, 1999

== Awards ==
- 1993 – National Chorale Competition (sponsored by Caritas Manila and DTI), Grand Prize winner
- 1998 – Awit Para sa Bayan (Centennial Choral Competition), Best Choice Piece and Grand Prize winner
- 1999 – I Concurso Coral de Ateneo, Best Mixed Choir
- 1999 – UP Los Banos Choral Competition, Grand Prize Winner
- 2003 – 1st Wedding Expo Philippines Choir Competition, 1st Runner-up

== Major concerts ==
- March 1995 – Into the Light, UP Abelardo Hall
- April 1996 – LAKAT (Lakbay Abot Kanta), CCP Little Theatre
- March 1997 – The Journey, Philam Life Theater
- December 1997 – An Evening with Chorus Paulinus, Hearts of Jesus and Mary Parish
- November 1998 – In Harmony, PCIB Tower II
- April 1999 – Simply Chorus Paulinus (an anniversary concert), CCP Little Theater
- April 2000 – Chorus Paulinus VIII, Philam Life Theater
- December 2000 – An Evening with Chorus Paulinus, Hearts of Jesus and Mary Parish
- April 2001 – CP@Nine, PCIB Tower I Theater
- November 2002 – Chorus Paulinus...Ten Years After, Philam Life Theater
- November 2003 – Himig Chorus Paulinus, Philam Life Theater
- October 2015 – Sperare, Hearts of Jesus and Mary Parish

== Outreach programs ==
- May 1995 – Into the Light, Key Cities of Bohol and Cebu
- May 1996 – LAKAT (CCP Outreach), Visayas Tour
- May 1997 – LAWIG (CCP Outreach), Mindanao Tour
- April 1998 – In Harmony, Bohol Tour
- May 1999 – U.S. Tour
- May 2000 – Chorus Paulinus VIII, U.S. Tour
- May 2001 – CP @ Nine, U.S. Tour
- November 2015 – St. Therese's Story of the Soul, Clark County Library Performing Arts Center, Las Vegas, Nevada, USA

== See also ==
- Philippine Madrigal Singers
- Ryan Cayabyab
