= The Joy of Christmas =

Studio album by Mormon Tabernacle Choir, Leonard Bernstein, New York Philharmonic
- Released: October 1963
- Recorded: September 3, 1963
- Genre: Christmas
- Labels: Columbia Masterworks, Sony Masterworks

The Joy of Christmas is a Christmas album featuring the Mormon Tabernacle Choir, along with the New York Philharmonic conducted by Leonard Bernstein. Richard P. Condie directed the choir.

Originally released by Columbia Masterworks in October 1963, the 50+ minutes album, unusually long for its time for one LP, was released on compact disc on July 7, 1990, by Sony Masterworks. The album was reissued in 1997 with additional selections by Bernstein and the philharmonic, including music from Tchaikovsky's The Nutcracker Suite.

On October 23, 1979, the album was RIAA certified as a Gold album.

== Track listing ==
No.	Title	Length
1.	"O Come, All Ye Faithful"	3:00
2.	"The Twelfth Night Song"	2:20
3.	"Away in a Manger (Choir Only)"	3:10
4.	"Carol of the Bells (Orchestra Only)"	2:40
5.	"The Animal Carol"	3:25
6.	"The Twelve Days of Christmas"	5:05
7.	"O Little Town of Bethlehem"	2:45
8.	"Patapan"	2:15
9.	"Joy to the World"	1:30
10.	"Lullay My Liking"	5:10
11.	"God Rest Ye Merry, Gentlemen"	2:05
12.	"La Virgen Lava Pañales"	5:10
13.	"Deck the Halls with Boughs of Holly"	1:20
14.	"Joseph Lieber, Joseph Mein (Joseph Dearest, Joseph Mine) (Choir Only)"	2:25
15.	"Once in Royal David's City"	3:50
16.	"Silent Night, Holy Night"	3:20
17.	"Overture: Allegro giusto"	3:16
18.	"March: Tempo di marcia viva"	2:32
19.	"Dance of the Sugar Plum Fairy: Andante non troppo"	1:41
20.	"Trépak (Russian Dance): Tempo di trepak, molto vivace"	1:02
21.	"Arab Dance: Allegretto"	2:57
22.	"Chinese Dance: Allegro moderato"	1:08
23.	"Dance of the Mirlitons: Moderato assai"	2:07
24.	"Children's Prayer"	3:44
25.	"Hallelujah"	4:45

== Charts ==
Chart (2004)	Peak position
Billboard 200	8
