= My Kind of Christmas (Mike Douglas album) =

Studio album by Mike Douglas
- Released: October 1967
- Genre: Vocal pop, Christmas
- Label: Epic BN 26322
- Producer: Manny Kellem

My Kind of Christmas is a 1967 album of Christmas standards sung by Mike Douglas, with orchestra arranged and conducted by Frank Hunter.

The Christmas album came the year after Douglas' only Top 40 single and during the peak of popularity of The Mike Douglas Show.

== Track listing ==
=== Side one ===
1. "The Christmas Song (Chestnuts Roasting on an Open Fire)" (Mel Tormé, Robert Wells) – 3:28
2. "The First Noel" (Traditional) – 2:19
3. "Do You Hear What I Hear?" (Noël Regney, Gloria Shayne Baker) – 2:37
4. "O Holy Night" (Adolphe Adam) – 2:08
5. "(The Story of) The First Christmas Carol" (Jay Darrow, Gloria Shayne Baker) – 3:14

=== Side two ===
1. "White Christmas" (Irving Berlin) – 3:22
2. "Silent Night, Holy Night" (Franz Xaver Gruber, Joseph Mohr) – 2:31
3. "Silver Bells" (Jay Livingston, Ray Evans) – 2:36
4. "Ave Maria" (Johann Sebastian Bach, Charles Gounod) – 2:36
5. "Touch Hands on Christmas Morning" (Earl Shuman, Leon Carr) – 2:11
