= Christmas at the White House =

Studio album by Burl Ives
- Released: 1972
- Genre: Christmas music
- Length: 37:13
- Label: Caedmon

Burl Ives chronology
How Great Thou Art (1971)	Christmas at the White House (1972)	Payin' My Dues Again (1973)

Professional ratings
Review scores
Source	Rating
Allmusic	3/5 stars

Christmas at the White House: Burl Ives Sings the Favorite Carols and Hymns of America's Presidents is a 1972 album by Burl Ives. It purports to be a collection of twelve presidents' favorite Christmas songs. It has not yet been released on CD.

Some of the selections were apparently based on speculation. For example, John Adams may have favored the rendition of "Joy to the World" by American composer William Billings because the Adamses attended Billings's church in Boston. Other selections were based on authoritative sources, such as presidential writings and direct communication with presidents' families.

The music was conducted by Tony Mottola, who often worked with Ives, and arranged by Mottola and Dick Lieb. The historical introductions to the songs were written by Barbara Holdridge. Ives is both the narrator of the introductions and the performer of the songs.

== Track listing ==
1. George Washington: "While Shepherds Watch'd Their Flocks by Night" – 2:55
2. John Adams: "Joy to the World" – 2:59
3. Thomas Jefferson & Dwight D. Eisenhower: "Adeste Fideles" – 3:04
4. Andrew Jackson: "Shout the Glad Tidings" – 2:53
5. Zachary Taylor: "It Came Upon a Midnight Clear" – 2:42
6. Abraham Lincoln: "We Three Kings of Orient Are" – 3:55
7. Ulysses S. Grant: "O Little Town of Bethlehem" – 3:12
8. Theodore Roosevelt: "Christmas on the Sea" – 2:34
9. Franklin D. Roosevelt: "Art Thou Weary, Art Thou Laden" – 2:44
10. John F. Kennedy: "Silver Bells" – 4:05
11. Lyndon Johnson: "Silent Night" – 2:44
12. Richard Nixon: "The Little Drummer Boy" – 3:26

== Sources ==
- Burl Ives, Christmas at the White House, Caedmon TC 1415, educational edition, 1972, back of album cover.
