= Beatrice Centner Davidson =

Canadian architect (1909–1986)

Beatrice Centner Davidson (1909 – March 5, 1986) was a Canadian architect living in Ontario.

She was born Beatrice Centner in Toronto. Davidson received her BArch from the University of Toronto in 1930; she received the Toronto Architectural Guild Bronze Medal on graduation. In 1937, she received a MArch, also from the University of Toronto; in the same year, she married Harry Davidson. Davidson worked intermittently for the architectural firm of P.A. Deacon. She also was a research assistant for professor Eric Arthur's book Toronto, No Mean City. She designed two houses in Toronto and designed and supervised the construction of furniture for family and friends.

The Toronto Architectural Guild Bronze Medal winner was traditionally hired by a local architectural firm. However, it was felt that Davidson did not have sufficient construction site experience for the job. She was told that she would be given the job if she returned in five years with sufficient relevant experience and if she would agree to not marry for the next ten years.

A home and furniture which she designed were featured in the August 1949 issue of Canadian Homes and Gardens. Davidson served as an ex officio jury member for the 1959 design competition for a new Toronto City Hall.

She died in Toronto at the age of 77.
