= Beyond the Season =

Studio album by Garth Brooks
- Released: August 25, 1992
- Studios: Jack's Tracks (Nashville, Tennessee)
- Genres: Christmas; country
- Length: 33:48
- Label: Liberty
- Producer: Allen Reynolds

Garth Brooks chronology
Ropin' the Wind (1991)	Beyond the Season (1992)	The Chase (1992)

Professional ratings
Review scores
Source	Rating
About.com	5/5 stars
AllMusic	3/5 stars
Christgau's Consumer Guide	(dud)
Entertainment Weekly	C+
Q	3/5 stars
The Rolling Stone Album Guide	1/5 stars

Beyond the Season is the first Christmas album by American country music artist Garth Brooks. It was released on August 25, 1992, by Liberty Records, and peaked at number 2 on both of Billboard magazine's Billboard 200 and Top Country Albums sales charts that year. Beyond the Season was also the best-selling Christmas/holiday album of 1992 in the United States with sales of 1,542,000 copies for the year according to Nielsen SoundScan. As of November 2014, the album has cumulative sales of 2,650,000 copies in the U.S. and is the seventeenth best-selling Christmas/holiday album in the U.S. during the entire SoundScan era (March 1991 – present).

== Background ==
Brooks commented on the album, saying:

"Beyond The Season hands down, without a doubt, is the most fun record that I've ever made. You always cut Christmas albums it seems in the middle of summer for some reason to have them prepared in time for Christmas. And we did this one in June and July of '92. I remember Mark Miller the engineer, had strung Christmas lights all through the studio, put the fake snow and turned the air conditioning down. It was a blast. This album I would make every day of my life if I could. Totally no pressure, you're singing about what counts and that's the feeling of Christmas. Which in my opinion should be shared everyday of the year, instead of just one day of the year. I hope you like it."

== Commercial performance ==
Beyond the Season peaked at #2 on the U.S. Billboard 200, and on the Top Country Albums. On November 15, 1995, Beyond the Season was certified Triple Platinum by the Recording Industry Association of America for shipment of 3 million copies in the United States. On March 17, 2026, the album was certified 4x Platinum.

== Track listing ==
No.	Title	Writer(s)	Length
1.	"Go Tell It on the Mountain"	Traditional	3:30
2.	"God Rest Ye Merry, Gentlemen"	Traditional	2:34
3.	"The Old Man's Back in Town"	Garth Brooks; Larry Bastian; Randy Taylor	2:34
4.	"The Gift"	Stephanie Davis	4:43
5.	"Unto You This Night"	Rex Benson; Steve Gillette	3:16
6.	"White Christmas"	Irving Berlin	2:55
7.	"The Friendly Beasts"	Traditional	3:32
8.	"Santa Looked a Lot Like Daddy"	Buck Owens; Don Rich	2:29
9.	"Silent Night"	Traditional	3:46
10.	"Mary's Dream"	Mark Casstevens; Bobby Wood	0:50
11.	"What Child Is This?"	Traditional	3:27
Total length:			33:36

== Personnel ==
- Robert "Bob" Bailey – backing vocals (tracks 1, 11)
- Bruce Bouton – steel guitar (tracks 3, 5, 8)
- Garth Brooks – lead vocals, acoustic guitar, harmony vocals (tracks 3, 8, 9)
- Mark Casstevens – acoustic guitar
- Gary Chapman – backing vocals (tracks 1, 11)
- Mike Chapman – bass guitar (tracks 1–9)
- Johnny Cobb – backing vocals (tracks 1, 11)
- Charles Cochran – string arrangements (tracks 10, 11)
- Landy Gardner – choir director (track 5)
- Carl Gorodetzky – violin (track 10)
- Rob Hajacos – fiddle (tracks 3, 8)
- Vicki Hampton – backing vocals (tracks 1, 11)
- Emily Harris – backing vocals (tracks 1, 11)
- Yvonne Hodges – backing vocals (tracks 1, 11)
- Jana King – backing vocals (tracks 1, 11)
- Chris Leuzinger – acoustic guitar (tracks 1–9), electric guitar (tracks 1–9)
- Bob Mason – cello (track 10)
- Donna McElroy – backing vocals (tracks 1, 11)
- Joey Miskulin – accordion (track 4)
- Donna Morris – backing vocals (tracks 1, 11)
- Allen Reynolds – harmony vocals (track 9)
- Milton Sledge – drums (tracks 1–9), percussion (tracks 1–9)
- Howard Smith – backing vocals (tracks 1, 11)
- Pamela Sixfin – violin (track 10)
- Gary Vanosdale – viola (track 10)
- Dennis Wilson – backing vocals (tracks 1, 11)
- Bobby Wood – acoustic piano, keyboards
- Cynthia Reynolds Wyatt – harp (tracks 10, 11)
- Christ Church Choir – choir (track 5)
- The Nashville String Machine – strings (track 11)
- Trisha Yearwood – harmony vocals (tracks 5, 9)

Production

- Matt Allen – recording assistant
- Carlos Grier – digital editing
- Jerry Joyner – design
- Mark Miller – recording engineer, mixing engineer
- Beverly Parker – photography
- Denny Purcell – mastering engineer
- Allen Reynolds – producer
- Virginia Team – art direction

== Charts ==
=== Weekly charts ===
Chart (1992)	Peak position
Australian Albums (ARIA)	128
Canadian Albums (RPM)	20
Canadian Country Albums (RPM)	3
US Billboard 200	2
US Top Country Albums (Billboard)	2

=== Year-end charts ===
Chart (1992)	Position
US Billboard 200	61
US Top Country Albums (Billboard)	11

Chart (1993)	Position
US Billboard 200	72
US Top Country Albums (Billboard)	15

=== Singles ===
Year	Single	Peak positions
Year	Single	US Country
1998	"Santa Looked a Lot Like Daddy"	41
1999	"Go Tell it on the Mountain"	72
2000	"White Christmas"	65
2000	"God Rest Ye Merry Gentlemen"	69

== Certifications ==
Region	Certification	Certified units/sales
Canada (Music Canada)	2× Platinum	200,000^{^}
United States (RIAA)	4× Platinum	4,000,000^{‡}
^{^} Shipments figures based on certification alone.^{‡} Sales+streaming figures based on certification alone.
