= Huron Carol =

Canadian Christmas hymn

"'Twas in the moon of Wintertime" ("Huron Carol")
Performed by the Men's Chorus of the United States Air Force Band

The "Huron Carol" (or "Twas in the Moon of Wintertime") is a Canadian Christmas hymn (Canada's oldest Christmas song), written probably in 1642 by Jean de Brébeuf, a Jesuit missionary at Sainte-Marie among the Hurons in Canada. Brébeuf wrote the lyrics in the native language of the Huron/Wendat people; the song's original Huron title is "Jesous Ahatonhia" ("Jesus, he is born"). The song's melody is based on a traditional French folk song, "Une Jeune Pucelle" ("A Young Maid"). The well-known English lyrics were written in 1926 by Jesse Edgar Middleton and the copyright to these lyrics was held by The Frederick Harris Music Co., Limited, but entered the public domain in 2011.

The English version of the hymn uses imagery familiar in the early 20th century, in place of the traditional Nativity story. This version is derived from Brébeuf's original song and Huron religious concepts. In the English version, Jesus is born in a "lodge of broken bark" and wrapped in a "robe of rabbit skin". He is surrounded by hunters instead of shepherds, and the Magi are portrayed as "chiefs from afar" who bring him "fox and beaver pelts" instead of the more familiar gold, frankincense and myrrh. The English translation uses a traditional Algonquian name, Gitchi Manitou, for God, which is not in the original Wendat version. The original lyrics are now sometimes modified to use imagery accessible to Christians who are not familiar with the cultures of Canada's First Peoples.

The song remains a common Christmas hymn in Canadian churches of many Christian denominations. It is also found in several American hymnals, including The Hymnal 1982 of the Episcopal Church (United States) (No. 114), The United Methodist Hymnal (No. 244) and Evangelical Lutheran Worship (No. 284).

Because the melody spans a modest range, it is ideally suited to instruments that have a limited pitch range, such as the Native American flute.

== Versions ==
The song was included, as "Jesous Ahatonia", on Burl Ives's 1952 album Christmas Day in the Morning and was later released as a Burl Ives single under the title "Indian Christmas Carol". Bruce Cockburn has also recorded a rendition of the song in the original Huron. Tom Jackson performed this song during his annual Huron Carole tour. Crash Test Dummies did it on their 2002 album, Jingle All the Way. A haunting choral arrangement by R. Anderson was included on the 1997 album The Mystery of Christmas, by the Canadian group the Elora Festival Singers. A new recording with a very mystical setting of the Huron Carol was released in 2011 performed by The Canadian Tenors. In 2001, Terry McDade and The McDades recorded a version featuring Indian bansuri on their Free Radio Records release "Midwinter". In 2002, Heather Dale released a trilingual version (Wendat [Huron], French, English) on her This Endris Night album, updated in 2017 as a YouTube video with an American Sign Language translation. Dale uses a very different English translation, attributed to Father H. Kierans. Sarah McLachlan recorded the song on her 2016 holiday album, Wonderland, released on the October 21, 2016.

== Lyrics ==
=== Huron ===
The original words of the carol in the Wendat language (Huron).

Estenniayon de tsonwe Iesous ahatonnia
onn' awatewa nd' oki n' onyouandaskwaentak
ennonchien eskwatrihotat n'onyouandiyonrachatha
Iesous ahatonnia, ahatonnia. Iesous ahatonnia.

Ayoki onkiennhache eronhiayeronnon
iontonk ontatiande ndio sen tsatonnharonnion
Warie onn' awakweton ndio sen tsatonnharonnion
Iesous ahatonnia, ahatonnia. Iesous ahatonnia.

Achienhkontahonraskwa d' hatirihwannens
tichion sayonniondetha onhwa achia ahatren
ondaie te hahahakwa tichion sayonniondetha
Iesous ahatonnia, ahatonnia. Iesous ahatonnia.

Tho ichien st' ahation tethotondi Iesous
ahwatatende tichion stanchitehawennion
asayontorenten ihatonk atsion sken
Iesous ahatonnia, ahatonnia. Iesous ahatonnia.

Onne ontahation chiahonayen iesous
ahatichiennonniannon kahachia handiayon
te honannonronkwannion ihotonk werisen
Iesous ahatonnia, ahatonnia. Iesous ahatonnia.

Te hekwatatennonten ahekwachiendaen
ti hekwannonronkwannion de sonywentenrände
outoyeti skwannonhwe icherhe akennonhonstha
Iesous ahatonnia, ahatonnia. Iesous ahatonnia.

=== English ===
The 1926 English version by Jesse Edgar Middleton.

'Twas in the moon of winter-time
When all the birds had fled,
That mighty Gitchi Manitou
Sent angel choirs instead;
Before their light the stars grew dim,
And wandering hunters heard the hymn:
"Jesus your King is born, Jesus is born,
In excelsis gloria."

Within a lodge of broken bark
The tender Babe was found,
A ragged robe of rabbit skin
Enwrapp'd His beauty round;
But as the hunter braves drew nigh,
The angel song rang loud and high...
"Jesus your King is born, Jesus is born,
In excelsis gloria."

The earliest moon of wintertime
Is not so round and fair
As was the ring of glory
On the helpless infant there.
The chiefs from far before him knelt
With gifts of fox and beaver pelt.
"Jesus your King is born, Jesus is born,
In excelsis gloria."

O children of the forest free,
O sons of Manitou,
The Holy Child of earth and heaven
Is born today for you.
Come kneel before the radiant Boy
Who brings you beauty, peace and joy.
"Jesus your King is born, Jesus is born,
In excelsis gloria."

=== English Translation of the Wendat ===
Have courage, you who are humans. Jesus, He is born.
Behold, it has fled, the spirit who had us as prisoner.
Do not listen to it, as it corrupts our minds, the spirit of our thoughts.
They are spirits, coming with a message for us, the sky people.
They are coming to say, 'Come on, be on top of life, rejoice!'
'Mary has just given birth, come on, rejoice.'
'Three have left for such a place; they are men of great matter.'

'A star that has just appeared over the horizon leads them there.'
'He will seize the path, a star that leads them there.'
As they arrived there, where He was born, Jesus.
The star was at the point of stopping, He was not far past it.
Having found someone for them, He says, 'Come here.'
Behold, they have arrived there and have seen Jesus.
They praised a name many times saying,
'Hurray, He is good in nature.'
They greeted Him with respect,
Oiling His scalp many times, saying, 'Hurray!'
'We will give to Him honour to His name.'
'Let us oil His scalp many times, show reverence for Him,
As He comes to be compassionate with us.'
It is providential that you love us, and think
'I should make them part of My family.'

== See also ==
- List of Christmas carols
