= Rex Benson =

Rex Benson may refer to:

- Sir Rex Benson (merchant banker) (1889–1968), English merchant banker and army officer
- Rex Benson (songwriter), American songwriter and music publisher
