= Melvin Hammond =

Melvin Hammond may refer to:

- F. Melvin Hammond, Idaho politician and general authority of the Church of Jesus Christ of Latter-day Saints
- Melvin Ormond Hammond, Canadian journalist and photographer
