= Jesse Edgar Middleton =

Canadian journalist, historian, and songwriter

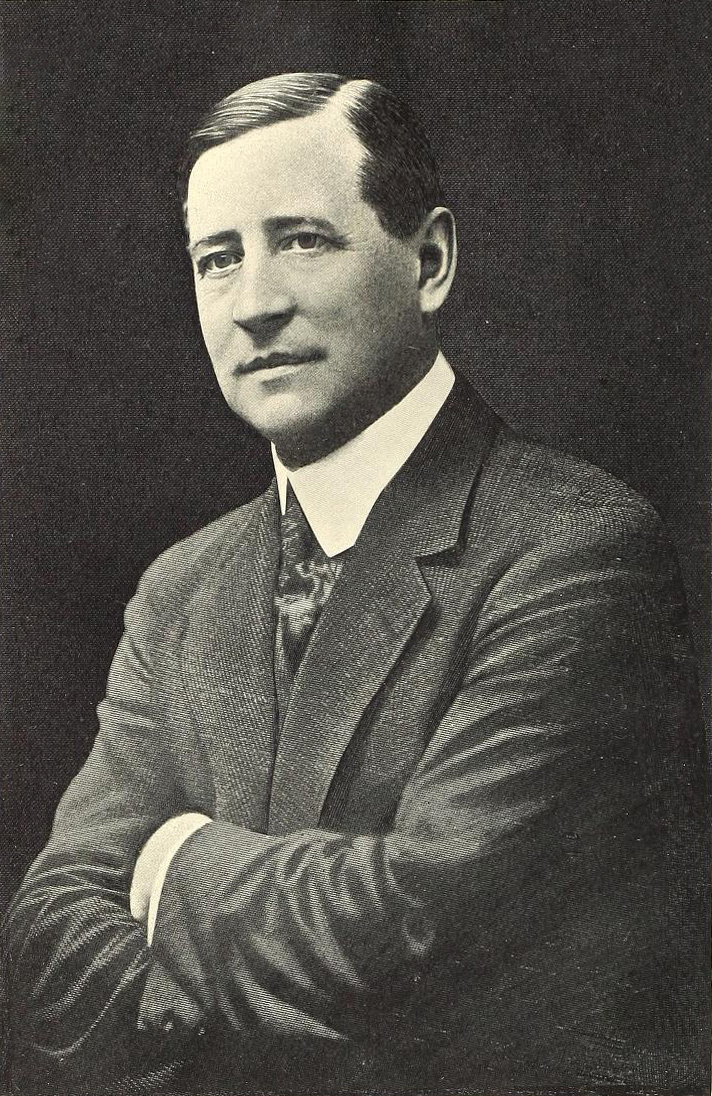
- Born: November 3, 1872; Wellington County, Ontario
- Died: May 27, 1960 (aged 87); Toronto, Ontario
- Resting place: Fort Macleod, Alberta
- Education: Dutton High School; Strathroy Collegiate
- Occupations: Historian, journalist
- Spouse: Bessie A. Jackson (m. 1899)
- Writing career
- Period: 20th century
- Genre: History

Jesse Edgar Middleton (November 3, 1872 – May 27, 1960) was a Canadian journalist, historian and songwriter.

== Biography ==
Middleton was born in Pilkington, Ontario, the son of Margaret Agar and Rev. Eli Middleton, a Methodist minister. He attended Dutton High School and Strathroy Collegiate. He then taught school for three years, and was a proofreader in Cleveland, Ohio, for three years. In 1899, he married Bessie A. Jackson and together they raised one son. They moved to Toronto in the early 1900s.

For most of his career, he worked as a journalist and as a special writer for Toronto newspapers. He became a music critic for the Mail and Empire, and in 1904 joined The News, where he wrote a column, "On the Side." He led the choir at Centennial Methodist Church, and sang in Toronto's Mendelssohn Choir. In 1926 he composed the English lyrics to a traditional Canadian Christmas hymn, the Huron Carol.

Aside from one volume of poetry and two novels, his main writing contribution was a lengthy historical account of Toronto and its local environs, The Municipality of Toronto (3 volumes). He also wrote a history of the province, The Province of Ontario: a History (4 volumes).

He died in Toronto in 1960 and was buried in Fort Macleod, Alberta.

== Works ==
- Sea Dogs and Men at Arms: A Canadian Book of Songs (1918)
- Huron Carol: The First Canadian Christmas Carol (1927)
- Province of Ontario: A History 1615 to 1927 (1927) with Fred Landon
- The Romance of Ontario (1931)
- Green Plush (1932)
- Toronto's 100 Years (1934)
- National Encyclopedia of Canadian Biography (1935) [co-edited]
- The Clever Ones (1936)
- William Tyrell of Weston (1937) [with Edith Morrison]
- Canadian Landscape (1944) [with F. H. Brigden]
- Green Fields Afar (1947) [with Clara Middleton]
