= Une jeune Pucelle =

French folk song from the 16th Century

"Une jeune Pucelle" is a French folk song from 1557, which has a melody that is based loosely on an older French song entitled "Une jeune Fillette".

The French words were set to an earlier Italian ballad from the sixteenth century titled "La Monica", which is also known as a dance, in German sources called Deutscher Tanz, and in Italian, French, Flemish, and English sources labeled Alemana, Almande, Almagne, Almande nonette, Balletto alta morona, Balletto celeste Giglio, Aria venetiana, Aria Venetia che cantava Scappino, Balo todesco, The Queen’s Almaine, or Oulde Almaine. It was also used for German texts such as "Ich ging einmal spazieren" and with sacred texts such as "Von Gott will ich nicht lassen", "Helft mir Gotts Güte preisen" and the Advent hymn "Mit Ernst o Menschenkinder".

The words of the Huron Carol ("Jesous Ahatonhia"), written probably in 1642 by the Jesuit missionary Jean de Brébeuf for the Hurons at Ste. Marie, were set to an adaptation of this melody.

== In classical music ==
William Byrd wrote a set of variations on the tune under "The Queen's Alman", which appears in the Fitzwilliam Virginal Book.

The melody of the closing chorale of Johann Sebastian Bach's Herr, wie du willt, so schicks mit mir, BWV 73, with the incipit "Das ist des Vaters Wille", is based on either "Une jeune Pucelle" or "Une jeune Fillette". Also Marc-Antoine Charpentier used the melody in his Quatrième Kyrie of the Messe de Minuit pour Noël (H9) (Midnight Mass for Christmas). Pierre Dandrieu wrote a set of six variations.

== Lyrics ==
Une jeune pucelle de noble cœur,
Priant en sa chambrette son Créateur.
L'ange du Ciel descendant sur la terre
Lui conta le mystère de notre Salvateur.
La pucelle esbahie de ceste voix,
Elle se peint à dire pour ceste fois:
Comment pourra s'accomplir telle affaire?
Car jamais n'eus affaire à nul homme qui soyt.

Ne te soucie, Marie, aucunement,
Celui qui Seignerie au firmament,
Son Saint-Esprit te fera apparaître,
Dont tu ne pourras connaître tost cet enfantement.
Sans douleur et sans peine, et sans tourment,
Neuf moys seras enceinte de cet enfant;
Quand ce viendra à le poser sur terre,
Jésus faut qu'on l'appelle, le Roy sur tout triomphant.

Lors fut tant consolée de ces beaux dits,
Qu'elle pensait quasi être en Paradis.
Se soubmettant du tout à lui complaire,
disant voicy l'ancelle du Sauveur Jésus-Christ.
Mon âme magnifie, Dieu mon sauveur,
Mon esprit glorifie son Créateur,
Car il a eu egard à son ancelle;
Que terre universelle lui soit gloire et honneur.

A young maid with a noble heart,
praying to her Creator in her chamber.
The angel, descending from heaven to earth,
told her the mystery of our Saviour.
The maid, astonished at this voice,
was moved to say at this point:
'How can such a thing be accomplished?
For never did I have converse with any man at all.'

'Fear not, Mary, at all:
he who is Lord of the firmament will send you his Holy Spirit,
from whom you will soon learn of the Child to be born.
Without sorrow, without pain, without torment,
you will carry this Child for nine months;
when the time comes to give him birth,
you must call him Jesus,
the King triumphing over all things.'

Then she was so consoled by these fine words,
that she felt as though she were in Paradise.
She submitted entirely to comply with all he said,
saying 'Here is the handmaid of the Saviour Jesus Christ.
My soul glorifies God my Saviour,
my spirit praises its Creator,
for he has looked upon his handmaiden;
may the whole earth be glory and honour to him.'
