= Huron Carole =

Canadian touring musical production

- Benefit tour by Tom Jackson, Shannon Gaye, Beverley Mahood, One More Girl, George Canyon
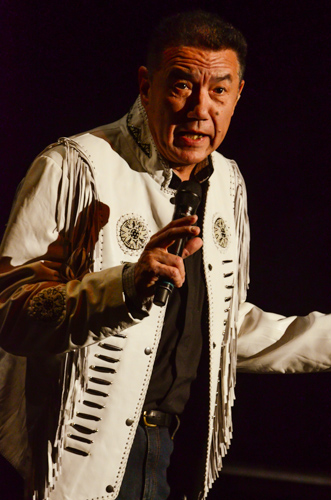
- Tom Jackson, Founder and Lead Performer
- Location: Cross-Canada tour
- Start date: November 23, 2013
- End date: December 19, 2013
- No. of shows: 16
- Website: Huron Carole

Tom Jackson, Shannon Gaye, Beverley Mahood, One More Girl, George Canyon concert chronology
- Huron Carole (2012); Huron Carole (2013)
- Annual Christmas tour to raise donations for Canadian foodbanks

The Huron Carole is a Canadian touring musical production which raises donations for local foodbanks, in collaboration with Food Banks Canada. Founded and led by entertainer Tom Jackson, the Huron Carole toured across Canada during the Christmas season of each year from 1987 to 2004. It collected more than $3.55 million, and numerous tonnes of food. After an eight-year hiatus, the Huron Carole began again in 2012 and 2013.

The name of the fundraiser comes from the Huron Carol, Canada's oldest Christmas carol, written by Father Jean de Brébeuf in the 17th century. The opening lines of the English version of the carol, " 'Twas in the moon of wintertime / When all the birds had fled" fits in with the tour's theme of the need to raise food for others, particularly in the cold of winter.

== First run ==
Tom Jackson founded the Huron Carole in 1987. From 1987 to 2004, the Huron Carole regularly toured across Canada during the Christmas season. Led by Jackson, who also performed in the show, the Huron Carole enlisted the help of musical artists from across Canada to raise money and donations for foodbanks. The musical style tended to country and soft rock, with a strong Christmas theme.

== Second run ==
The Huron Carole began again in 2012 and toured in 2013 as well.

=== 2013 Tour ===
The 2013 tour began on November 23 in Halifax and ended on December 19 in Victoria, appearing in sixteen cities in eight provinces.

The performers were Tom Jackson, Shannon Gaye, Beverley Mahood, One More Girl, and George Canyon, supported by a touring band.

The national sponsors for the tour were Great-West Life, London Life, Canada Life, Enbridge, Sentry, Nov, and CMT. There are also local sponsors in each city the tour covers.

== Related food-bank fundraisers ==
After the 2004 tour, Jackson began two new fundraisers for food-banks, Singing for Supper and Swinging for Supper, both beginning in 2005. Singing for Supper featured Jackson travelling smaller cities from Thunder Bay to Halifax, and playing concerts in churches and community halls along the way. Swinging for Supper is an annual series of fundraising golf tournaments, also under Jackson's leadership.

== The Cause ==
The Canadian food banks have a lot of community help with these events during the Christmas season. Unfortunately, the need in the summer months does not decrease, and the donations do. They have in recent years started to do local fundraising for "Christmas in July", but there really is not anything that is as far reaching as the Huron Carole.
