= The Dependables =

- DVD cover
- Directed by: Sidney J. Furie
- Written by: Richard Watson
- Produced by: Gary Howsam; Bill Marks
- Starring: Ali Kazmi; Louis Gossett Jr. Margot Kidder; Seymour Cassel; Bo Svenson
- Cinematography: Curtis Petersen
- Edited by: Saul Pincus
- Music by: Craig McConnell
- Distributed by: Moonstone Films
- Release date: June 3, 2014
- Running time: 101 minutes
- Country: Canada
- Language: English

The Dependables (previously known as Pride of Lions) is a 2014 straight-to-DVD family action film directed by Sidney J. Furie.

== Plot ==
Five young American soldiers are held hostage in Afghanistan by a Taliban warlord. When the US Army is slow to act, a grandmother and four grandfathers with military backgrounds fly to Afghanistan to rescue them.

== Cast ==
- Louis Gossett Jr. as Lou Jones
- Margot Kidder as Jean Dempsey
- Seymour Cassel as Dominic Ackers
- Bo Svenson as Mick Skinner
- Cedric Smith as Paul Stansy
- Tom Jackson as Sgt. Robinson
- Ali Kazmi as Razzaq
- Noah Reid as Elliott Ackers

== Production ==
Filming took place in Toronto and Sault Ste. Marie, Ontario.

== Reception and analysis ==
In his book Sidney J. Furie: Life and Films, author Daniel Kremer writes, "A Pride of Lions again reflected the Hit!-Iron Eagle formula, this time following a group of ex-military senior citizens who venture to Afghanistan to rescue their prisoner-of-war grandchildren." Director Sidney J. Furie is quoted in the book as saying, "A lot of people will look at such a film, or any direct-to-video work of mine, as just another unsophisticated little action thriller with the customary cheap thrills, but the work is of the utmost importance to me, and I always sit in with the color-timer and the sound mixer. These movies are what they are, but I always take a proactive role in every stage of production. I'm never on autopilot and I never take my leave from a project when the shooting stops." Margot Kidder is quoted as saying, "I haven't consistently laughed that hard on a movie set in years. We had such a good time."

Writing for the Journal of Popular Film & Television, Daniel Kremer writes that The Dependables is an example showing that Sidney J. Furie "thrived at making movies of Hawksian professionalism that venerate (mostly male) camaraderie".

Reviewer Valkor of the-other-view.com draws comparisons to The Expendables, writing, "The Dependables uses an obvious play on words to work against popular films, now a trilogy, The Expendables. The style is also the same in that it gathers a few well-known actors from the past, bringing them together for this film." The reviewer added, "I like the idea of bringing together these veteran actors who still look great and it would appear as though they were having a blast making this film". The reviewer ultimately concludes, "The idea is pretty sound but execution fails miserably."

Reviewer JJBona of cityonfire.com writes, "In the last couple of years, we’ve reported a number of projects riding the success wave of The Expendables franchise. Some are currently filming, other are sitting in development hell. [...] One take that’s definitely in the can is the action-comedy The Dependables. If you thought Stallone’s crew were a bunch of old men, check out this cast: Bo Svenson (Walking Tall Part II), Louis Gossett Jr. (Iron Eagle), Seymour Cassel (The Mountain Men), Cedric Smith (Forever Knight), Tom Jackson (Star Trek: The Next Generation) and Margot Kidder (1978’s Superman)." The reviewer ultimately concludes, "We seriously doubt you’ll spend your hard earned money on it".
