= The Friendly Beasts =

Christmas song

"The Friendly Beasts" is a traditional Christmas song about the gifts that a donkey, cow, sheep, camel, and dove give to Jesus at the Nativity. The song seems to have originated in 12th-century France, set to the melody of the Latin song "Orientis Partibus".

The song is also known as "The Song of the Ass", The Donkey Carol", "The Animal Carol", and "The Gift of the Animals".

The current English words were written by Robert Davis (1881-1950) in the 1920s. They appear in The Coming of the Prince of Peace: A Nativity Play with Ancient Christmas Carols, arranged by William Sloane Coffin and Helen A. and Clarence Dickinson, published in 1920 by The H. W. Gray Company. In the play, the lyrics for the song "The Friendly Beasts" are attributed to Robert Davis; the song is also ascribed "XII Century | Arranged by Clarence Dickinson". The lyrics run:

Jesus our brother, strong and good,

Was humbly born in a stable rude,

And the friendly beasts around Him stood,

Jesus our brother, strong and good.

"I," said the donkey, shaggy and brown,

"I carried His mother up hill and down

I carried her safely to Bethlehem town;

"I," said the donkey, shaggy and brown.

"I," said the cow all white and red,

"I gave Him my manger for His bed,

I gave Him my hay to pillow His head;

"I," said the cow, all white and red.

"I, said the sheep with curly horn,

"I gave Him my wool for His blanket warm,

He wore my coat on Christmas morn;

"I," said the sheep, with curly horn.

"I," said the dove, from the rafters high,

"Cooed Him to sleep that He should not cry.

We cooed Him to sleep, my mate and I;

"I," said the dove, from the rafters high.

"I," said the camel, yellow and black

"Over the desert upon my back

I brought Him a gift in the wiseman's pack;

"I," said the camel, yellow and black.

And every beast, by some good spell,

In the stable dark was glad to tell

Of the gift he gave Immanuel;

The gift he gave Immanuel.

== Covers and translation ==
Burl Ives included the song on his 1952 album Christmas Day in the Morning. Since then, it has been recorded by many other artists, including the Louvin Brothers; Harry Belafonte; The Harry Simeone Chorale; Johnny Cash (Belafonte and Cash use the title "The Gifts They Gave"); Risë Stevens; Tennessee Ernie Ford; Danny Taddei; Peter, Paul and Mary; and Sufjan Stevens. Brian Stokes Mitchell in 2008 sang this song with the Mormon Tabernacle Choir, complete with donkey, cow, and sheep "voices". Garth Brooks recorded it on his 1992 platinum album Beyond the Season, giving the verses to various songwriter friends. "The Friendly Beasts / L'Amikaj Bestoj" is a (free) simple score with all seven verses in English plus an Esperanto translation by Gene Keyes.

== See also ==
- List of Christmas carols
