= Centennial of the City of Toronto =

Anniversary celebration in Toronto

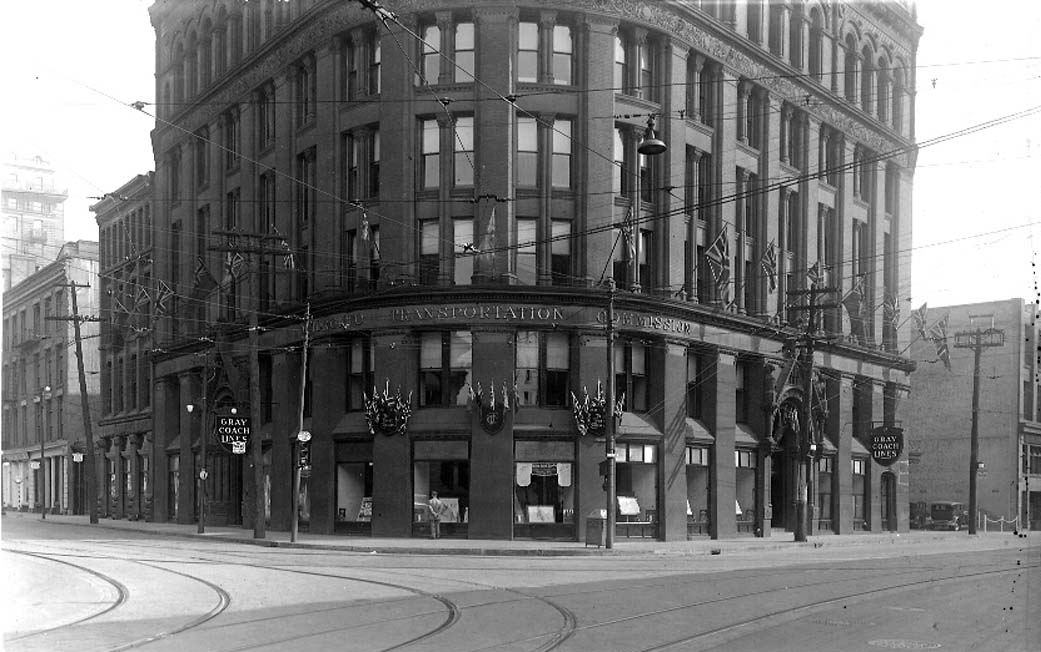
The Toronto Transit Commission's headquarters decorated for the 1934 centennial.

The Centennial of the City of Toronto was celebrated in 1934, commemorating the incorporation of York into the City of Toronto. The celebrations included numerous events, exhibitions, and commemorations. Of the most modern relevance is the "Toronto's Hundred Years" Publication Committee, which published Toronto's 100 Years, from which much historical perspective may be found.

== Organization ==
Along with a General Centennial Committee, Toronto had at least sixteen Special Committees. They were the Music and Pageantry, Permanent Memorial, Flying, The "Toronto's Hundred Years" Publication, Travel Promotion, Veteran Reunion, Pictures, Religious Services, Stamp Exhibition, Sports, Street Decorations, Flower Show, Song Judging, Public Address, National Groups, and the Drills Corps Display Committee (which included a Mailing List Committee).

=== General Centennial Committee ===
- Honorary Chairman: Brigadier-General C. H. Mitchell, C.B., C.M.G., D.S.O.
- Chairman: J. A. Northey
- Director: Lieutenant-Colonel H. R. Alley, O.B.E.
- His Worship William J. Stewart, Mayor of the City of Toronto
- J. E. Atkinson, The Toronto Daily Star
- H. C. Bourlier, Toronto Convention and Tourist Association
- George Brigden, Board of Education
- C. L. Burton, Toronto Industrial Commission
- Colonel H. S. Cameron, Toronto Transportation Commission
- Alderman Ralph C. Day, the Council of the City of Toronto
- J. E. Ganong, Board of Harbour Commissioners
- W. G. Jaffray, The Globe
- Brigadere-General C. H. Mitchell, C.B., C.M.G., D.S.O., Toronto Board of Trade
- John Munro, Trades and Labor Council
- J. A. Northey, Royal Agricultural Winter Fair
- Colonel The Honorable W. H. Price, The Government of the province of Ontario
- Controller J. G. Ramsden, Board of Control of the City of Toronto
- T. A. Reed, University of Toronto
- Douglas S. Robertson, The Evening Telegram
- F. D. L. Smith, The Mail and Empire
- J. P. Travers, Separate School Board
- W. Wadsworth, Formerly of the Council of the City of Toronto
- F. E. Waterman, Canadian Manufacturers Association
- John Westren, Canadian National Exhibition Association

=== Special Committees ===
It is possible more Committees existed, as it was published "It is greatly regretted that the names of the members of other committees which are being formed are not available for this edition."

Music and Pageantry Committee	Ernest MacMillan, B.A., Mus. Doc., F.R.C.M., F.R.C.O., (chairman), Captain J. S. Atkinson, Eugene Beaupré, Milton Blackstone, E. P. Burns, C. B. Cleveland, F.R.I.B.A., Fredric C. Foy, H. A. Fricker, M.A., Mus. Doc, F.R.C.O., (Chairman - Music Subcommittee), Major A. C. Galbraith, Miss Pearl McCarthy, M.A., B.Litt., (Oxon), J. Campbell McInnes, A. J. Mason, Lawrence Mason, M.A., Ph.D., J. E. Middleton, Herbert E. Moore, F.R.A.I.C., (Chairman - Pageantry Sub-Committee), W. M. Murdoch, George A. Patton, B.S.A., Thomas M. Sargant, Owen Staples, O.S.A., Edgar Stone, Miss E. Tedd, F. R. McVity
Permanent Memorial Committee	George H. Locke, M.A., LL.D., (chairman), C. E. Chambers, Hector Charlesworth, Shirley Denison, K.C., Alderman H. W. Hunt, Tracy D. Le May, Colonel Mackenzie Waters, M.C.
Flying Committee	Wing-Commander D. G. Joy, A.F.C., R.C.A.F., Squadron Leader G. S. O'Brian, A.F.C., R.C.A.F., Major R. E. Nicholl, Fleet-Lieutenant W. A. Curtis, D.S.C, R.C.A.F., Fleet-Lieutenant A. H. Keith Russell, R.C.A.F., Lee Murray
The "Toronto's Hundred Years" Publication Committee	F. D. L. Smith, (chairman), Eric Arthur, M.A., A.R.I.B.A., Hugh Eayrs, Main Johnson, A. H. Robson
Travel Promotion Committee	W. Fulton, (chairman), A. H. Foster, John V. Foy, W. F. Prendergast, H. F. Tilley, Charles Watson
Veteran Reunion Committee	Major Alex Lewis, (chairman), Colonel W. Rhodes, D.S.O., M.C., Captain W. W. Parry, K. C., Captain V. W. Fairweather, Sergeant Charles J. Brown
Pictures Committee	Martin Baldwin, M. O. Hammond, Arthur Lismer, T. A. Reed
Religious Services Committee	Rev. Canon C. V. Pilcher, M.A., D.D., Anglican Church, (chairman), Rev. John Marshall, Baptist Church, Rev. G. M. Dunn, Presbyterian Church, Rev. G. Kelly, B.A., Roman Catholic Church, Major Noah Pitcher, Salvation Army, Rabbi S. Sachs, B. A., Jewish Synagogues, Rev. W. Harold Young, M.A., D.D., United Church of Canada
Stamp Exhibition Committee	C. F. Foster, Fred Jarret, G. G. Macdonald, W. I. MacTavish, Donald Taylor
Sports Committee	Lieutenant-Colonel T. R. Loudon, (chairman), George H. Beedham, Hamilton Cassels, John de Gruchy, Chief Inspector George Guthrie, Alderman Fred Hamilton, Charles E. Higginbottom, Elwood Hughes, James G. Merrick, P. J. Mulqueen, Fred Nobert, Harry Price, MPP, Charles E. Ring, Major Alexander Sinclair, John W. Turner, T. K. Wade
Street Decorations Committee	Lieutenant-Colonel F. H. Marani, F.R.A.I.C., (chairman), Fred S. Haines, Maurice Grimbly, F. M. Kay, Ivor Lewis, F. W. Peasnell, Percy Quinn, W. H. Stainton
Flower Show Committee	Percy Bone, (chairman), C. E. Chambers, G. I. Christie, B.S.A., Ds. C., John F. Clarke, Harry Endean, J. B. Fairbairn, Lionel Godson, John S. Hall, William McKay, F. C. Nunnick, B.S.A., John Oakes
Song Judging Committee	Ernest Seitz, (chairman), Jack Arthur, Rex Battle, Donald Heins, Peter C. Kennedy, E. J. Pratt, M.A., D.D. Th. D., F.R.S.C.
Public Address Committee	Major L. Anthes, W. J. Cairns, J. G. Clarke, S. B. Gundy, Colonel B. O. Hooper, J. McCoubrey, W. G. Mills, J. F. M. Stewart, John Tory, Captain R. J. Williams, E. W. Wright, K.C.
National Groups Committee	Kenneth L. Cameron, (chairman), Mrs. Frank Adams, J. H. K. Booth, Mrs. P. Foster, N. Hornyansky, Rev. J. I. McKay
Drills Corps Display Committee	Inspector Robert Alexander, Mrs. J. B. Colgan, A. Coulter, Mrs. Mary Cusack, Mrs. J. Hall, Mrs. J. G. Howell, A. Johnson, Mrs. Thomas Kerr, Mrs. Charles C. Lewis, Mrs. Mary C. Mayhew, Morley E. McKenzie, R. E. Midgley, S. C. Parks, Display Marshall, Dr. H. Pocock, Mrs. Ruth M. Quinn, Mrs. Rockwood, John Roxborough
Mailing List Committee	George A. Mitchell, (chairman), W. J. Foster, Mrs. A. May Ralston

== Events and ceremonies ==
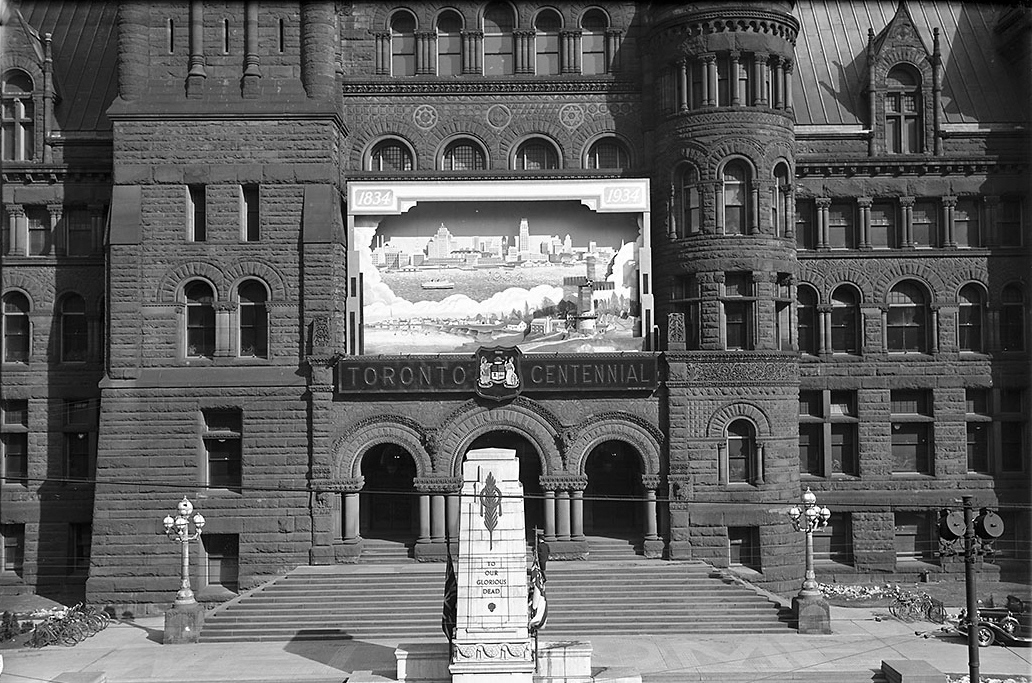
Toronto City Hall decorated for centennial celebrations.

While events occurred throughout the year, many were scheduled to happen in one of three three-day periods. The first began on Victoria Day, the second after Dominion Day (now Canada Day), and the third at the end of summer, but before the Canadian National Exhibition's annual opening.

=== Victoria Day Weekend, May 24, 25, 26 ===
Of note, Toronto first proclaimed Victoria Day in 1848.

==== Re-opening of Fort York ====
Victoria Day (the 24th) was dedicated to the re-opening of Fort York.

==== The Empire Pageant ====
Running all three nights of the period was an "inspiring historic" Empire Pageant. Held at night, the outdoor performances looked at the history of the city from the establishments of Natives and M. de la Galissoniere, to then present day educational, industrial, and social developments.

=== Canadian Corps Reunion, August 4, 5, 6 ===
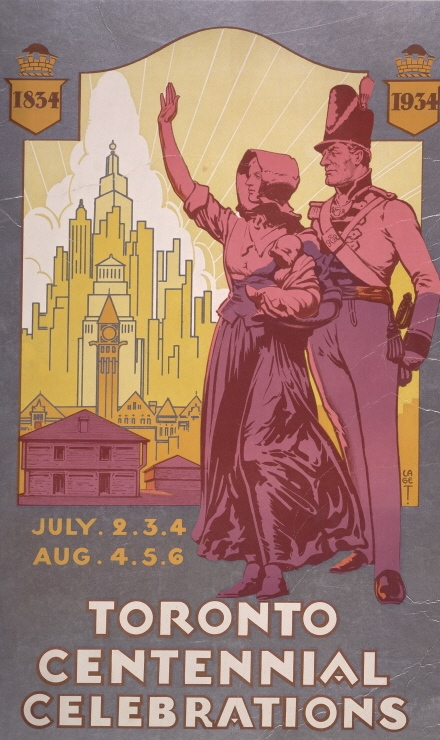
A poster advertising centennial events in July and August.

The first-ever reunion of the Canadian Corps was held in Toronto, over a three-day period. While there was mischief reported, for the most part, the soldier's celebration went off smoothly.

While original plans called for German and Austrian veterans to be included in the parade, they were scratched on the day of. Corps reunion officials said, "They will not parade with the corps. Beyond that, we do not wish to comment."

==== During the reunion ====
After two days of hospitalization in Neudeck, East Prussia, President Paul Von Hindenburg of Germany died of uremia poisoning on 2 August 1934. Shortly after news of the 86-year-old's passing made Berlin, Chancellor Adolf Hitler was named president by constitutional amendment. By the start of Toronto event for Great War veterans, German minister of propaganda Joseph Goebbels was reported to be working on a "high-pressure drive to bring Germans in mass to the polls Aug. 19 to vote Adolf Hitler into office as... "Fuehrer and Reich Chancellor"."

The host city itself was busy dealing with the Ontario Hunger Marchers. Marchers were holding a meeting in Toronto parks without permits. While the hunger marchers had walked the highways down to the event, they were sent home via capacity-loaded trucks, as ordered by Premier Mitchell Hepburn, to remove them from the city. These Marchers were so prominent that some children mistook a veteran with a red beret for one.

==== Other notes ====
Some residents complained that "our largest hotels lack decorations of any description, and especially this week," when the veterans were in town.
