= Eric Arthur =

Canadian architect, writer and educator

Eric Ross Arthur
- Born: 1 July 1898; Dunedin, New Zealand
- Died: 1 November 1982 (aged 84); Toronto, Ontario, Canada
- Occupation: Architect
- Awards: Order of Canada

Eric Ross Arthur, CC (1 July 1898 – 1 November 1982) was a New Zealand-born Canadian architect, writer and educator. He designed over 100 projects in Canada from 1925-1965. He was a voice for architectural conservancy while also being an architect of Modern Design. Arthur organized the international competition that selected the Toronto City Hall. He also worked to preserve and restore heritage buildings, such as the St. Lawrence Hall 1850s civic building in Toronto.

Born in Dunedin, New Zealand, the eldest of five sons of Frederick and Jean Arthur, he attended Otago Boys High School, where he received the New Zealand Art Society medal for drawing. In 1917 and 1918, he received architectural training in Dunedin with Arts & Crafts practitioner Basil Hooper. In 1918 Arthur enlisted with the New Zealand Rifle Brigade, arriving in England just before the war ended.

In 1919, he enrolled at the University of Liverpool, School of Architecture under Sir Charles Herbert Reilly, whose Beaux-Arts curriculum was influenced by American-style classicism. In 1919, Arthur was awarded the Lord Kitchener National Memorial Scholarship. He was also awarded the Lord Leverhulme Prize in civic design and architecture twice; in 1919 and 1922. He was also awarded the Holt Travelling Scholarship in 1921, which he used to visit London, Berlin and Paris, including the École des Beaux-Arts.

Arthur graduated from the University of Liverpool with a Bachelor's of Architecture and a Certificate in Civic Design in 1922. After graduation, he joined the firm of Sir Edwin Lutyens and Sir Aston Webb in London, England. He assisted William Naseby Adams in the design of Britannic (now Lutyens) House for the Anglo-Persian Oil Company. The two also competed successfully for the War Memorial, Dewsbury, built in 1923. Arthur earned a Master of Arts in 1926.

Arthur married fellow architectural student Doris Deborah Debert in 1923. They had two children: Paul and Jean. He emigrated to Canada in 1923 to teach architecture at the University of Toronto (U of T).

Arthur received his license to practice architecture in Ontario in 1929. He would plan over 100 projects during his career, including 20 industrial buildings for Canada Packers. He partnered with several architects during his career: Anthony Adamson from 1929 to 1934, with William Eric Fleury, George H. Piersol and Robert Gordon Calvert from 1938 to 1949, and with Fleury and Stanley Bennett Barclay from 1949 to 1965. His first project, in 1929, was a house for Canada Packers president James Stanley McLean. Arthur designed Wymilwood, the Students' Union building for Victoria University at U of T St. George, built in 1954.

In 1933, he was one of the founders of the Architectural Conservancy of Ontario (an architectural conservation organization). During the Centennial of the City of Toronto in 1934, Arthur was on the "Toronto's Hundred Years" Publication Committee, which published Toronto's 100 Years.

In 1954, Arthur was one of the main voices of opposition to the proposed design of the new Toronto City Hall. Arthur organized the Architecture faculty and students at the University to fight the proposed design. Toronto City Council accepted his advice and organized an international competition, with Arthur as co-ordinator on behalf of the City government. Notably, he organized the panel of architects that eventually selected Viljo Revell's design.

The rejected design opposed by Arthur

Revell's winning design of Toronto City Hall

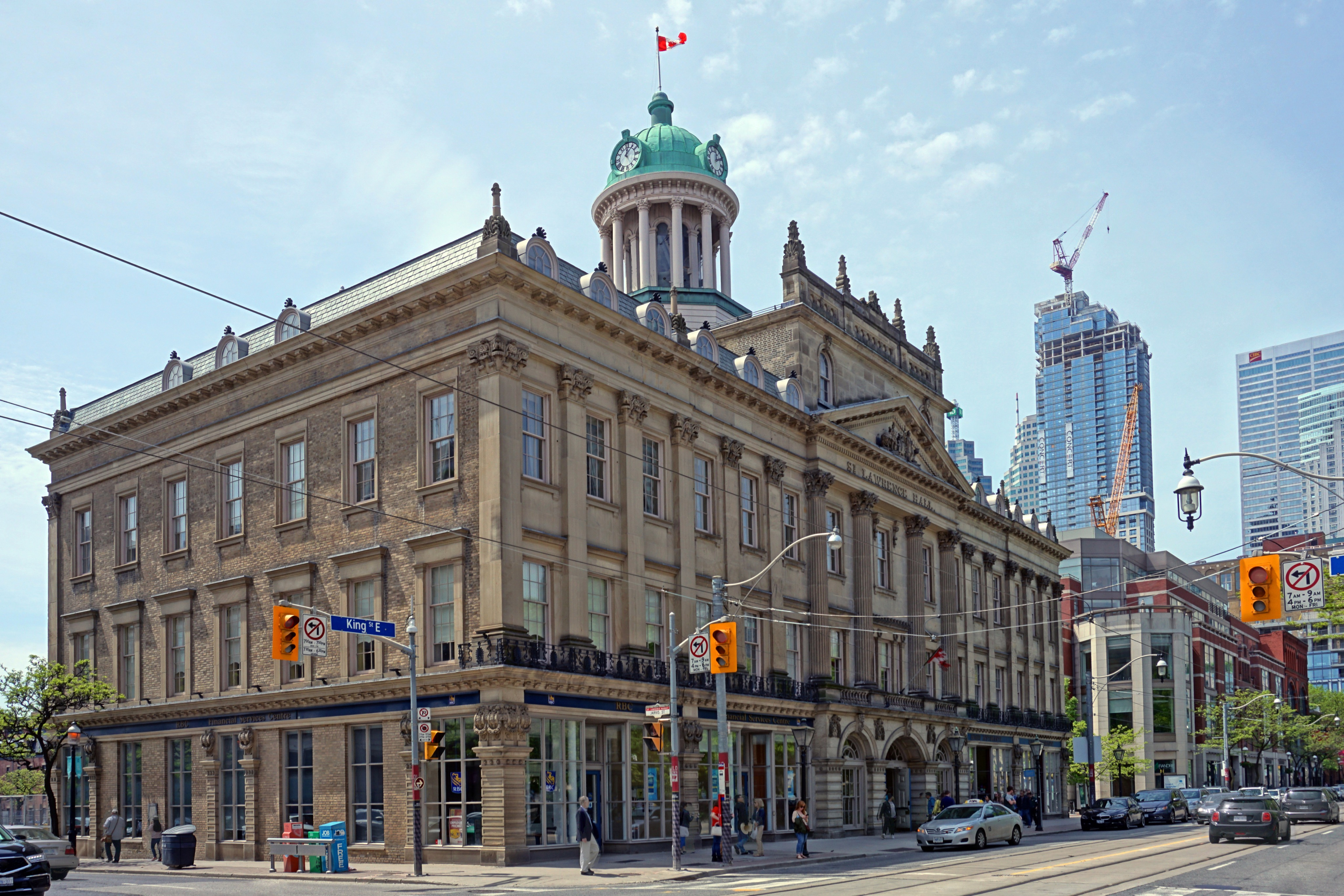
St. Lawrence Hall on King Street

From 1966 to 1968, Arthur directed the restoration of St. Lawrence Hall, a City of Toronto Centennial project. The 1850 civic building had fallen into disrepair and a portion actually collapsed during the restoration. He acted as restoration consultant on other heritage projects, including the Enoch Turner Schoolhouse in Toronto, and St. Andrew's Presbyterian Church in Niagara-on-the-Lake, Ontario.

Arthur was a professor until 1966, and remained a professor emeritus until his death. In 1964, he wrote the book, Toronto, No Mean City. In 1968, he was made a Companion of the Order of Canada.

In 2001, the University of Toronto opened the new Eric Arthur Gallery in the Faculty of Architecture building named in his honour.
