= Christmas Day in the Morning =

Studio album by Burl Ives
- Released: 1952
- Genre: Folk, Christmas
- Label: Decca

Burl Ives chronology
Historical America in Song (1950)	Christmas Day in the Morning (1952)	Folk Songs Dramatic and Humorous (1953)

Professional ratings
Review scores
Source	Rating
Allmusic	4.5/5 stars

Christmas Day in the Morning (Decca DL 5428, 1952) is the first of several Christmas albums by the folk singer Burl Ives. Subtitled Yuletide Folk Songs, this album includes seven traditional Christmas carols, from the well-known "What Child Is This?" to the little-known "Down in Yon Forest" and "The Seven Joys of Mary." "Jesous Ahatonia" is better known as the "Huron Carol." Ives released it as a single under the title "Indian Christmas Carol" (Decca 25585, 7 inch, 45 rpm).

An unidentified reviewer for The New York Times wrote that "'The Friendly Beasts' and 'The Seven Joys of Mary,' the songs that Mr. Ives sings to his own guitar accompaniment, are the most attractive, for in the others the ballad singer is pulled out of his element by being starred as the soloist with a choir and an orchestra."

The same eight songs, along with four others, were released as Christmas Eve with Burl Ives (Decca DL 8391) in 1957. These songs, in turn, were released as Twelve Days of Christmas (Pickwick SPC 1018) in the 1960s.

== Track listing ==
=== Side 1 ===
Track	Song Title
1.	There Were Three Ships
2.	The Friendly Beasts
3.	What Child Is This?
4.	[Jesous Ahatonia] Huron Carol

=== Side 2 ===
Track	Song Title
1.	The Seven Joys of Mary, Part 1
2.	The Seven Joys of Mary, Part 2
3.	Down in Yon Forest
4.	King Herod and the Cock
