= Toronto, No Mean City =

Toronto architecture book by Eric Arthur

- Cover of the 1974 edition
- Author: Eric Arthur
- Subject: Architecture of Toronto; history of Toronto; architectural conservation
- Published: 1964 by University of Toronto Press Incorporated
- Publication place: Canada

Toronto, No Mean City is a 1964 book by Canadian architect Eric Arthur covering the architectural history of Toronto. The book advocates for conservation of the city's architecture and helped to expand the city's heritage movement.

== Background and content ==
Originally from New Zealand, Eric Arthur moved to Canada in September 1923 to teach design at the University of Toronto's School of Architecture. Having trained under Edwin Lutyens at the University of Liverpool, then a leading school of architecture, Arthur's lectures helped to introduce the Modernist architecture movement to Toronto. (Note: Beatrice Centner Davidson was one of his first architecture students at the University of Toronto. She and her husband, Harry Davidson, became leaders in advocating for contemporary art and architecture in Toronto. Another student and later editor of Canadian Architect, James Murray, recalled: In a real sense, Arthur was Mr. Architectural Education in Canada. He taught us architectural design through five years of the course, and also the history of architecture, particularly modern architecture. When he taught us design, he wasn't looking at the past. He was a marvellous interpreter and analyst of the origins of the Modern Movement – Gropius, Le Corbusier, Frank Lloyd Wright.) The University of Toronto's dean of architecture, Blanche van Ginkel, later recalled: "[Arthur] was the first, or one of the few, who wanted to introduce into Toronto a sense of the twentieth century in architecture." (Note: In 1957–58, Arthur served as the professional adviser and chairman of the jury in a competition for the design of a new Toronto City Hall. In Toronto, No Mean City, Arthur writes of the new design: "Taller buildings will be built before the end of the century here and elsewhere in North America, but there will be no comparable or no more renowned city hall.")

After moving to Toronto, Arthur quickly became an active member in local architecture groups. He sought to protect Toronto's architectural legacy through writing and activism, with actions towards that including his publishing a series of articles from 1927 through 1929 on early Ontario architecture; organizing a photographic survey from 1926 through 1931 of 1,400 pre-1840 Ontario buildings; founding the Architectural Conservancy of Ontario in 1933; his 1938 book The Early Buildings of Ontario, the first serious study of the subject; working with Canada's Department of Northern Affairs and Natural Resources in 1960 to document historic Ontario buildings; and leading the restoration of St. Lawrence Hall in 1966–1967 for Toronto's official Centennial project.

Surely no city in the world with a background of three hundred years does so little to make that background known.

— Eric Arthur, Toronto, No Mean City

Arthur wrote Toronto, No Mean City in 1963, the first edition being published in 1964. The book covers the architectural history of Toronto, as well as Toronto history more generally from the First Nations' Toronto Carrying-Place Trail up to 1900. The book was the first professional history of Toronto architecture, providing overviews of the evolution of the city's building styles, mostly by focusing on monumental buildings. The book advocates for conservation of the city's architecture, voicing worries about the rate at which the city was demolishing historic buildings. In the epilogue, he writes: "In the march of progress every vestige of our nineteenth-century heritage will have disappeared ... it is not inconceivable that by 2000 AD all the nineteenth-century buildings dealt with in this book will be one with Nineveh and Tyre." The first edition includes an appendix with biographies of Toronto architects, expanded in later editions alongside new appendices with biographies of Toronto builders and contractors and information on the origins of Toronto street names.

== Reception and legacy ==
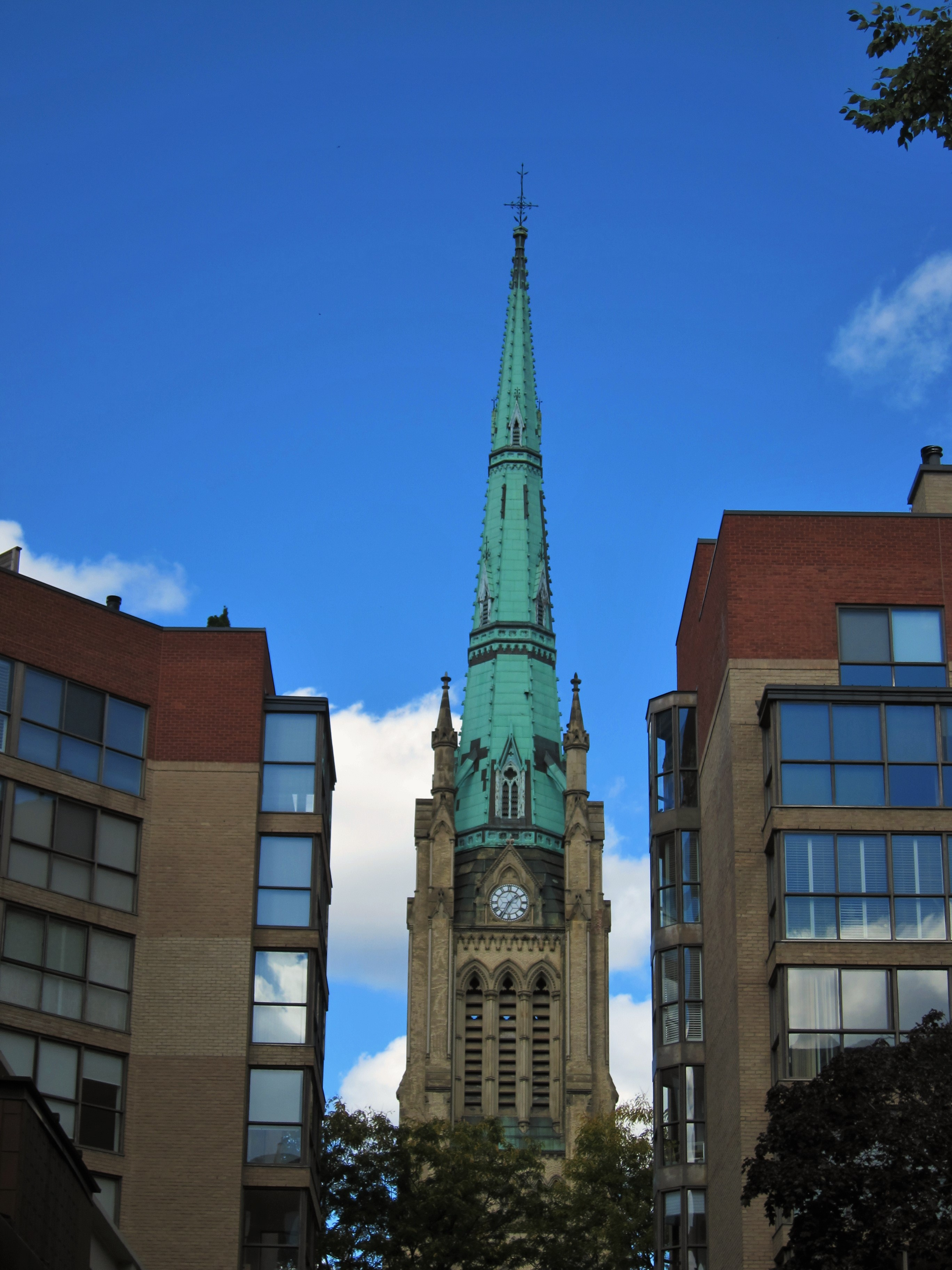
When Toronto redesigned its Market area in 1980–81, the designers followed Arthur's advice in the book to maintain the unobstructed view of St. James Cathedral from King Street East.

In a 1965 review, architect Quentin Hughes describes the book as a valuable reference to architectural historians, but that "the main appeal of this book inevitably will be mostly strongly felt by its local inhabitants." In a 1966 review, art historian Alan Gowans writes that the book is "only incidentally about architecture", and is instead more concerned with the development of Toronto's personality. Gowans concludes that, "however scattered the research, it is there; no one will ever be able to write about Canadian culture again without consulting No Mean City, nor will anyone who has read it be able to walk Toronto streets again without its coming to mind." In her 1982 obituary of Arthur, architecture critic Adele Freedman reflects that much of the writing in the book "is quite sloppy," but advises readers, "don't forget, he began all this. ... These days, we can have a debate; before him, we wouldn't have had anything."

Freedman writes the book had "an enormous impact" on first release. Canadian writer Susan Crean writes that when the book was being written Toronto was generally unappreciative of its art community. The book resulted in greater awareness of Toronto's architectural history and broader interest in preservation efforts, helping to prevent the demolition of heritage buildings in the city. Among Arthur's eleven books on heritage topics, Toronto, No Mean City was by far his most popular, elevating him to a larger audience. Architectural historian Michaelangelo Sabatino compares Arthur's resulting influence to Kenneth Clark, Lewis Mumford and Philip Johnson, though lacking the international audience. Edith Firth, a librarian at the Toronto Public Library and friend of Arthur, recalled:

The thing about Eric is he made you see things you were familiar with. In No Mean City, he says St. Paul's Roman Catholic Church is the most beautiful in Toronto. "Don't be silly," I told him. "It's dirty, dingy, run-down." It's been cleaned up since. "Come down and have a look," he insisted and dammit, he was right. He could see it, I couldn't.

Responding to the worries Arthur raised in the book's epilogue about whether any 19th century buildings would remain by the year 2000, Tom Cruickshank reflects, " ... the year 2000 has come and gone, and although much has been lost in the intervening years, nineteenth-century Toronto is hardly an ancient memory. In fact, its surviving older building are cherished today to a much greater extent than a generation ago."

The demolition of a building at 115 King Street East in the late 1930s left a gap between two buildings with a view towards St. James Cathedral. In the book, Arthur advocates for the preservation of the view, advice the Toronto City Council accepted when the Urban Design Group redesigned the Market area in 1980–81. In 1986, architectural historians William Dendy and William Kilbourn commented on the redesign: "A dramatic view of the cathedral façade and tower now added a new and picturesque element to Toronto's downtown – an area graced by few architectural vistas. ... the vista north to St. James' makes the central landmark of Toronto in the 1870s a focal point for Front Street in the 1980s."

In 2005, the Dominion Modern Museum of Modern Architecture hosted an exhibition on Toronto architecture with a title playing on the book's name: "Mean City: From Architecture to Design: How Toronto Went Boom!" Exhibition curator John Martins-Manteiga drew inspiration from Arthur's book, suggesting Toronto should reflect on its past rather than continuing to construct countless condos.

== See also ==
- Architecture of Toronto
- History of Toronto
- List of oldest buildings and structures in Toronto
