= Toronto's 100 Years =

1934 book by Jesse Edgar Middleton

Toronto's 100 Years is a book by Jesse Edgar Middleton, published by Toronto's Centennial Committee in 1934. Set in a modern typeface, it contains 82 inside illustrations and numerous advertisements for Toronto businesses.

The book begins with the founding of Toronto on the banks of the Lake Ontario's north shore by Colonel John Graves Simcoe in 1793. It goes on to detail its subsequent rise into one of Canada's largest cities.

The book uses American English, much as Toronto's Globe newspaper did, despite the federal government's usage of British English (in actuality Canadian English), since Confederation.

== Contents ==
The sections are titled "A Glance at the Beginning", "The Folks Who Built Toronto", "Domestic Life", "Political Life", "Municipal Life", "Parks and Services", "Educational Life", "Commerce and Industry", "Professional Life", "Military Affairs", "Artistic Life", "Sporting Life", "Church Life", "The Great Commissions" and "An Epilogue".

Other chapters include an overview of Toronto's first extensive industry, a hide-tanning factory opened by Jesse Ketchum in 1812, which began a march of industry which now totals over 100 manufacturers within the Toronto area.

The Epilogue, or Appendix, is made up of several articles, such as "The Order of a Service of Thanksgiving and Prayer, March 5th, 1934", "City Council 1934", and "Centennial Committees".
