= Tom Jackson (actor) =

Canadian actor and singer (born 1948)

Tom Jackson CC
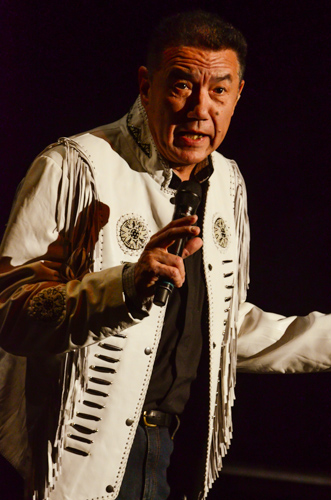
- Jackson in 2012
- Born: Thomas Dale Jackson; 27 October 1948 (age 78); One Arrow First Nation, Saskatchewan, Canada
- Occupations: Actor, singer
- Years active: 1985–present
- Spouse: Alison Jones (m. 1991)
- Children: 4

Thomas Dale Jackson, CC (born 27 October 1948) is a Canadian actor and singer. He created and starred in an annual series of Christmas concerts called the Huron Carole for 18 years. He was the Chancellor of Trent University from 2009 until 2013. He played Billy Twofeathers on Shining Time Station and Peter Kenidi on North of 60.

== Life and career ==
Tom Jackson was born on the One Arrow Reserve, Saskatchewan, near Batoche, the son of Rose, a Cree, and Marshall, an Englishman. He moved with his family to Namao, Alberta at age seven, and then to Winnipeg, Manitoba when he was fourteen. A year later, he dropped out of high school and lived on the streets for several years.

As an actor, he has appeared in television shows such as North of 60 and Shining Time Station where his character Billy Twofeathers debuted in its Halloween episode "Scare Dares". Jackson also made a guest appearance on Star Trek: The Next Generation in the season seven episode "Journey's End". His films include Loyalties and The Diviners.

He also starred in Grizzly Falls in 1999 and appeared in the 2007 horror thriller Skinwalkers. In 2014, he appeared in The Dependables, as Sergeant Robinson. In 2019, he played White Bull, a Ute drug lord, alongside Liam Neeson in the film Cold Pursuit. He appeared in the 2023 series Sullivan's Crossing.

He has also released several albums of country and folk music.

== Personal life ==
Jackson now resides in Port Hope, Ontario with his family.

== Philanthropy ==
A well-known philanthropist, Jackson created an annual series of Christmas concerts called the Huron Carole. Featuring Jackson and numerous other Canadian singers and performers, the Huron Carole troupe travels across the country each year, raising money for the Canadian Association of Food Banks. An album of Christmas songs recorded to tie-in with the tour is an annual best seller in Canada. After 17 years, Jackson retired the Huron Carole and in its place launched Singing for Supper, a cross-Canada tour that plays smaller community venues raising money and gifts of food, during the 2005 Christmas season.

After North of 60 cast member Mervin Good Eagle died by suicide in October 1996, Tom started the Dreamcatcher Tour.

In the spring of 1997 Jackson's home town was bracing for "the flood of the century" that had already put towns south of the US/Canada border under water. Jackson was instrumental in organizing flood relief concerts across the nation (Calgary, Winnipeg).

== Honours and decorations ==
Jackson has been honoured several times for his life's work. Most notably, in 2000, he was made an Officer of the Order of Canada and is a former member of the Order of Canada Advisory Council. He has been nominated for Juno Awards and Gemini Awards. He has also received honours from several Canadian universities, including honorary degrees from the University of Calgary, Trent University, the University of Lethbridge and Carleton University. He also received the Humanitarian Award at the 2007 Juno Awards due to his charitable efforts. In May 2014, Jackson received a Governor General's Performing Arts Award (GGPAA) for his lifetime contributions to Canadian broadcasting. At the Gala honouring GGPAA recipients on 10 May, Jackson took to the National Arts Centre stage to perform one of his songs.

On 14 April 2009, Jackson was announced as the tenth chancellor for Trent University. Jackson held this position until 2013.

Canadian medals, orders, and decorations	Ribbon Bar	Year bestowed
Order of Canada (CC)		Officer 2000; Companion 2020
125th Anniversary of the Confederation of Canada Medal		1992
Queen Elizabeth II Golden Jubilee Medal		2002
Queen Elizabeth II Diamond Jubilee Medal		2012
Saskatchewan Centennial Medal		2005
Alberta Centennial Medal		2005

== Filmography ==
Year	Title	Role	Notes
1985	Spirit Bay	Will	TV series (1 Episode)
1986	Loyalties	Eddy	Nominated–Genie Award for Best Performance by an Actor in a Supporting Role
1988	Martha, Ruth and Edie		
1988	Street Legal	Geordie Roberts	TV series (1 Episode)
1989–1990	The Campbells	Five Claws	TV series (2 Episodes)
1991–1995	Shining Time Station	William "Billy" Twofeathers	Main role; TV Series
1991	Clearcut	Tom Starblanket	
1992–1997	North of 60	Peter Kenidi	Main role; TV Series; Nominated–Gemini Award for Best Actor in a Continuing Leading Dramatic Role (1995, 1996, 1998)
1993	Spirit Rider	Albert St. Clair	TV movie
1993	Medicine River	Harlen Bigbear	TV movie
1993	The Diviners	Jules	TV movie Nominated–Gemini Award for Best Performance by an Actor in a Leading Role in a Dramatic Program or Mini-Series
1994	Street Legal	David Cormier	TV series (2 Episodes)
1994	Star Trek: The Next Generation	Lakanta	TV series (1 Episode)
1995	Great Canadian Ghost Stories	Host	
1995	500 Nations	voice	TV Miniseries
1996	The Adventures of Shirley Holmes	Mac	TV series (1 Episode)
1999	Grizzly Falls	Joshua McTavish	
2000	Trial by Fire	Peter Kenidi	TV movie
2000	The Longhouse Tales	Hector Longhouse	Main Role; TV Series
2001	Dream Storm	Peter Kenidi	TV movie
2002	Tom Stone	Ray Swiftwater	TV series (1 Episode)
2002	Relic Hunter	Bobby Green	TV series (1 Episode)
2005	Mee-Shee: The Water Giant	Custer	
2005	Distant Drumming: A North of 60 Mystery	Peter Kenidi	TV movie
2006	Skinwalkers	Will	
2006	Law & Order: Criminal Intent	Chief Johnson	TV series (1 Episode)
2007	Little Mosque on the Prairie	Professor Crakle	TV series (1 Episode)
2011	Befriend and Betray	Guy Poirier	TV movie
2012	Deadfall	Old Native American Hunter	
2014	The Dependables	Sgt. Robinson	
2014	The Best Laid Plans	George	TV series (2 Episodes)
2018	Cardinal	Lloyd Kreeger	TV series (4 Episodes)
2019	Cold Pursuit	White Bull	
2019; 2022	Outlander	Tehwahsehkwe	TV series (3 Episodes)
2021	Supergirl	Warden Wyatt Kote	TV series (1 episode)
2023	Sullivan's Crossing	Frank Cranebear	Series regular

== Discography ==
=== Albums ===
Year	Album
1990	Sally Ann
1990	Love, Lust and Longing
1994	No Regrets
1997	Home This Christmas
1997	That Side of the Window
2001	I Will Bring You Near
2006	Singing for Supper on Tour
2011	'Twas in the Moon of Wintertime
2015	Ballads Not Bullets
2018	The Essential

=== Singles ===
Year	Single	CAN Country	Album
1993	"No Regrets"	43	No Regrets
1995	"Few and Far Between"	47	No Regrets
1995	"Humble Me"		No Regrets
1997	"Dance with the Devil"		That Side of the Window
1998	"Before the Owl Calls My Name"		That Side of the Window
1998	"That Side of the Window"		That Side of the Window
2002	"Love Don't Live Here Anymore"		I Will Bring You Near
2011	"The Gift"		'Twas in the Moon of Wintertime
2015	"Blue Water"		Ballads Not Bullets

== See also ==
- Indigenous Canadian personalities

Academic offices
Preceded by Roberta Bondar	Chancellor of Trent University; 2009-2013	Succeeded by Don Tapscott
