= Melvin Ormond Hammond =

Canadian photographer, journalist (1876-1934)

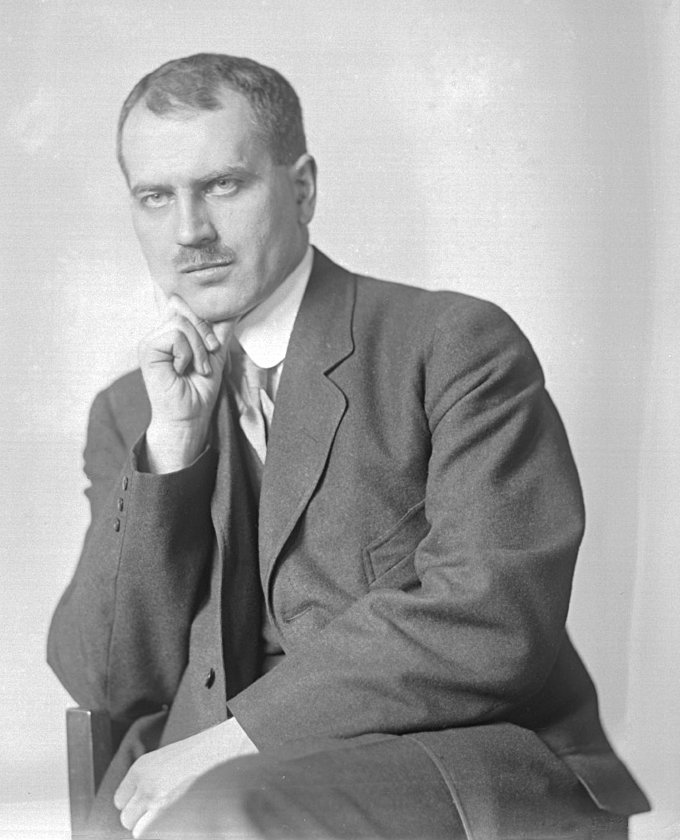
- Born: July 17, 1876; Clarkson, Ontario
- Died: October 11, 1934 (aged 58); Toronto, Ontario
- Other name: M. O. Hammond
- Occupations: journalist, photographer

Melvin Ormond Hammond (17 July 1876 – 11 October 1934), known professionally as M. O. Hammond, was a Canadian journalist, photographer, and author.

== Life ==
M. O. Hammond was born in Clarkson, Ontario (now part of Mississauga) the only son of Alvin and Catharine (Nauman) Hammond. His parents were farmers, and young Melvin had to help out with the daily chores besides going to school, first in Clarkson, then in Oakville, Ontario. He first ventured into journalism at the age of 14, when he became a correspondent for the Oakville Star. Three years later, he moved to Toronto, where he got a position with the Toronto Globe. He started out as the secretary of the managing editor but soon became a general reporter, and shortly afterwards was posted as a political reporter at Queen's Park, the seat of the government of Ontario.

In 1900, he married Clara Williams, a Methodist minister's daughter; together, they had a son, Harold James (b. 1901) and a daughter, Helen Isabel (b. 1909). From 1903 to 1906, Hammond was sent to Ottawa, reporting for the Globe from Parliament Hill. After his return to Toronto, he worked in various editorial positions at the Globe until his death in the autumn of 1934.

== Work ==
Besides his interests in politics, his different positions at the Globe permitted him to also satisfy his interests in Canadian history and culture. As arts editor of the Globe, he wrote on, promoted, and came to know many Canadian artists and writers of his time.

Although Hammond was a successful journalist, his work as a photographer has proved of more lasting value. He recognized the value of photography early on, and documented his travels extensively. As a member of the Toronto Camera Club, he had been exhibiting his photographic works regularly at various exhibitions, including the Canadian National Exhibition. Hammond illustrated many of his newspaper articles with his own photographs. Over the years, he acquired a reputation as a skilled portrait photographer, and through his memberships in the Toronto Camera Club and the Arts and Letters Club of Toronto also had the opportunity to photograph many famous artists of his time.

Beyond journalism and photography, Hammond also wrote three books:

- Confederation and Its Leaders, Toronto, McClelland, Goodchild and Stewart, 1917; a book containing political biographies
- Canadian Footprints: A Study in Foregrounds and Backgrounds, Toronto, MacMillan, 1926; documents some of the most important historic sides across Canada
- Painting and Sculpture in Canada, Toronto, The Ryerson Press, 1931

== See also ==
- Newton MacTavish, another journalist and photographer from Toronto
- Centennial of the City of Toronto, 1934, of which Hammond was on the Pictures Committee.
- A photo gallery of images taken by M. O. Hammond.
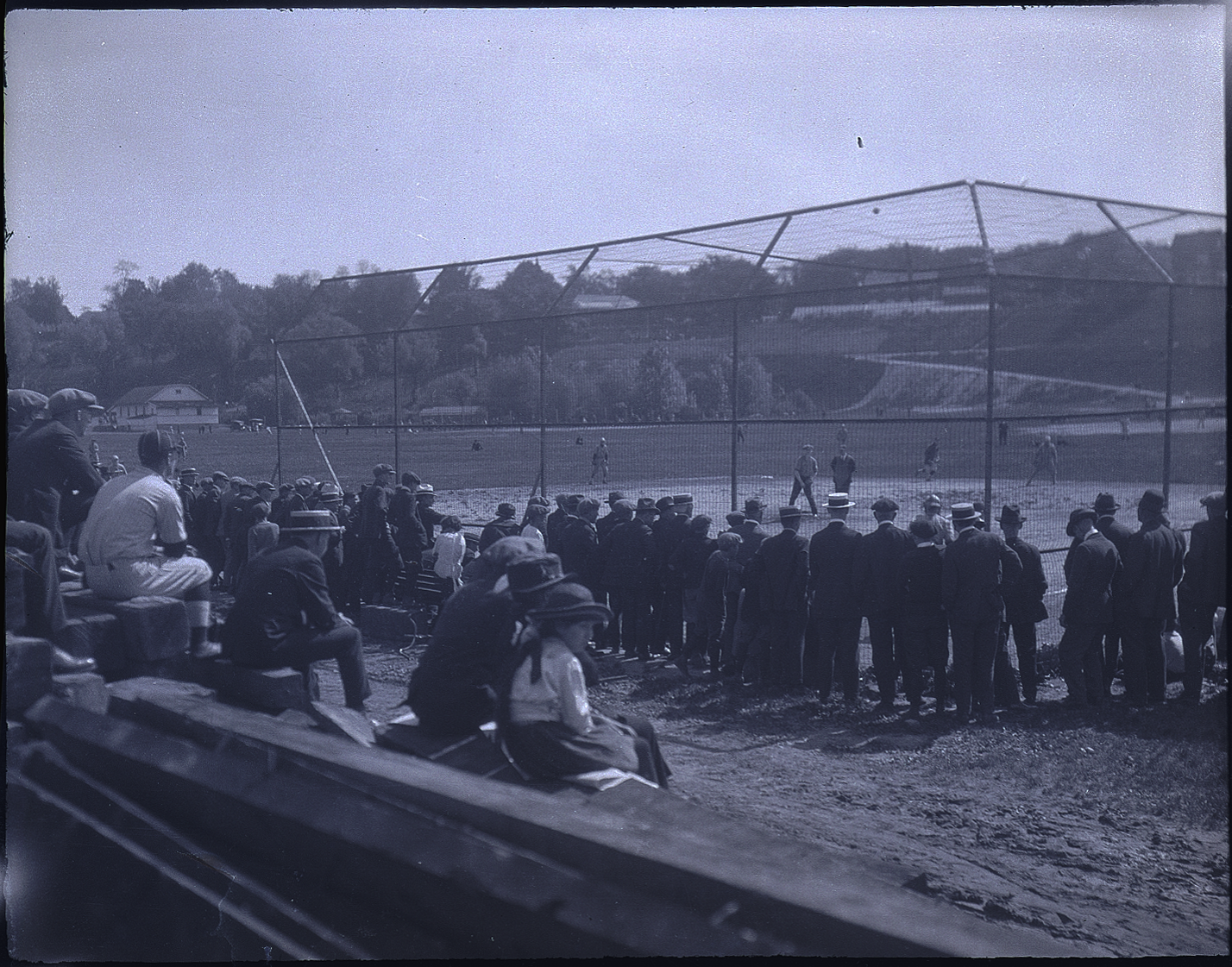
Baseball game, Don Valley, Toronto, 1923

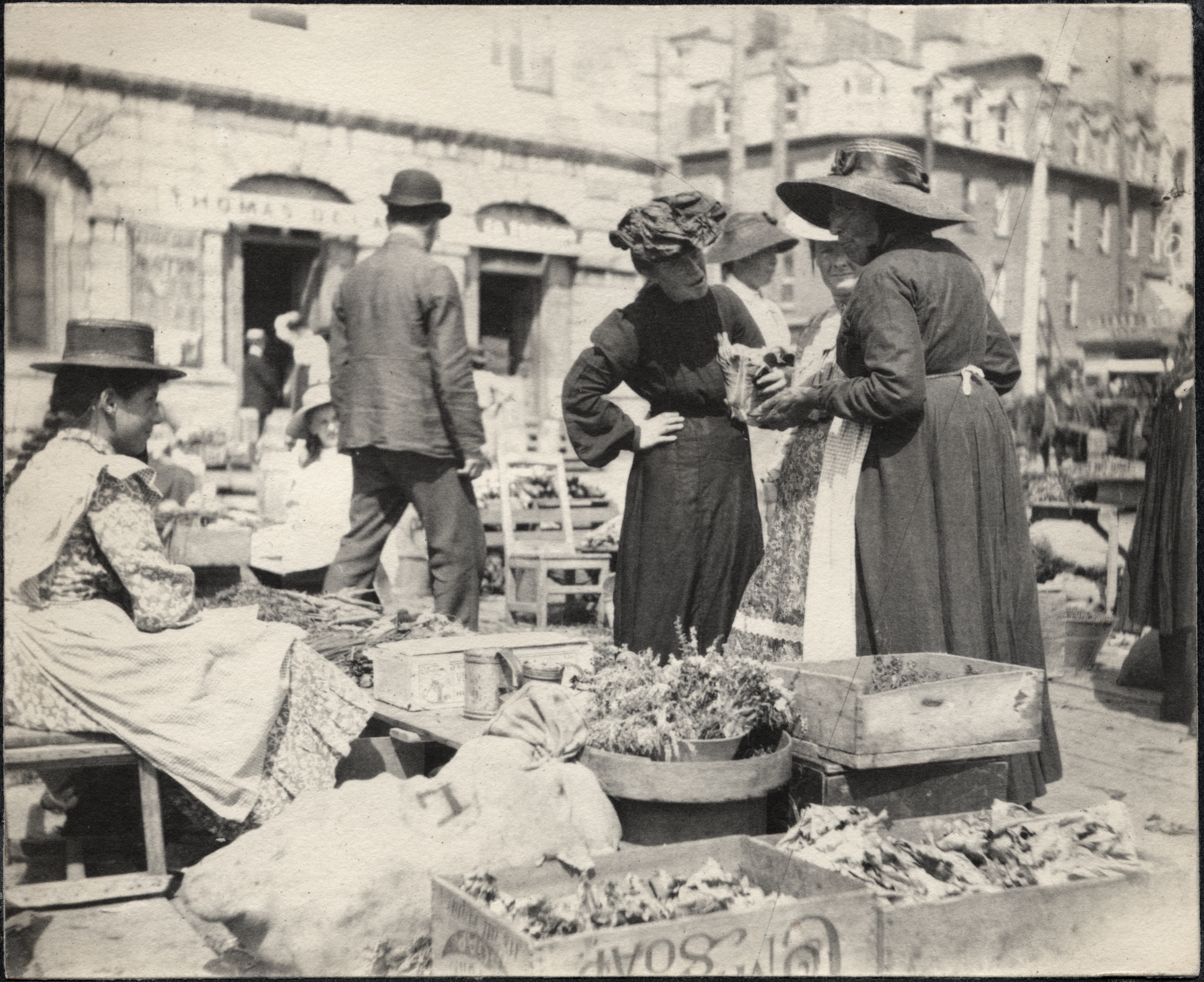
Champlain Market, [ca. 1905]

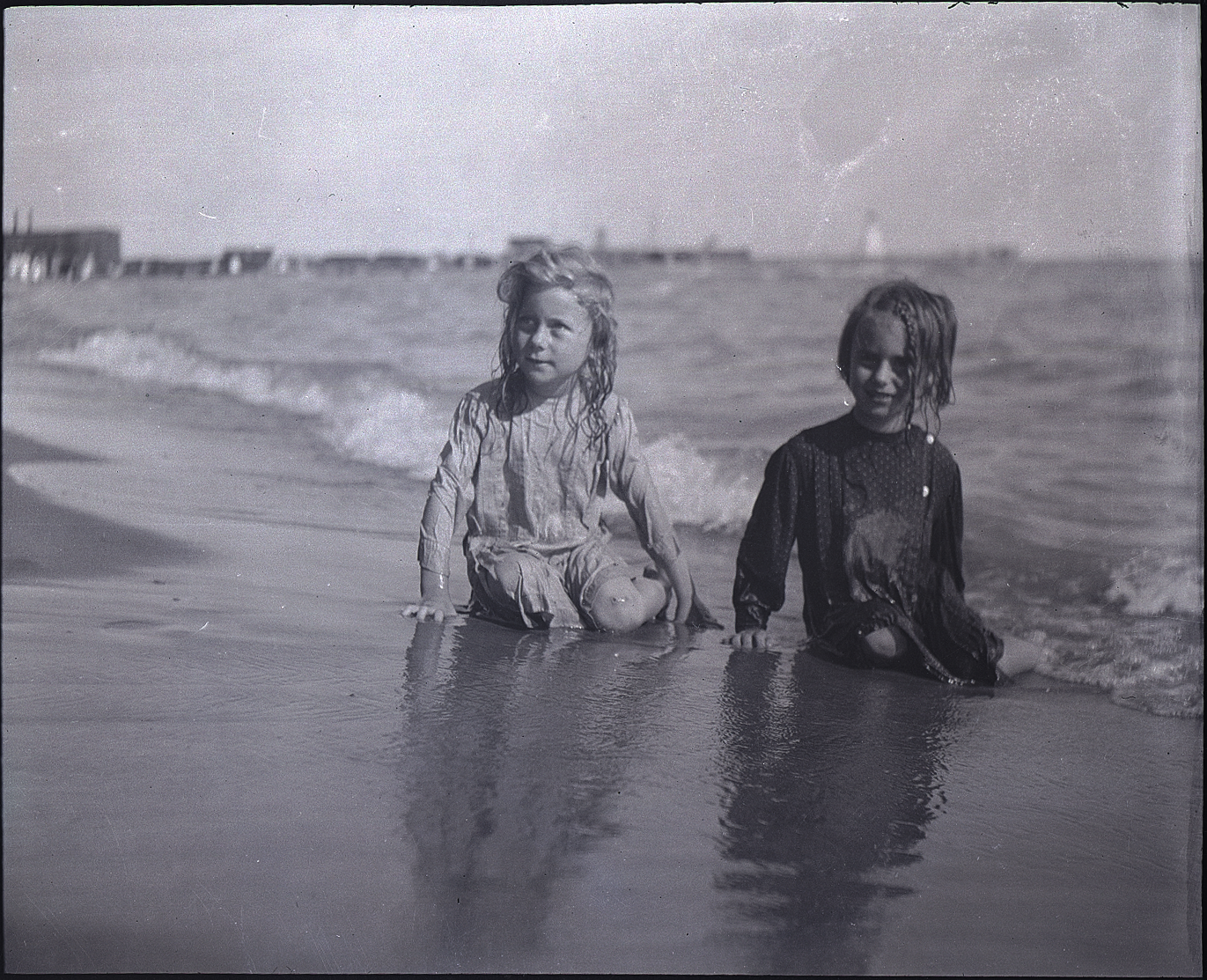
Children on the beach, Port Dover, 1910

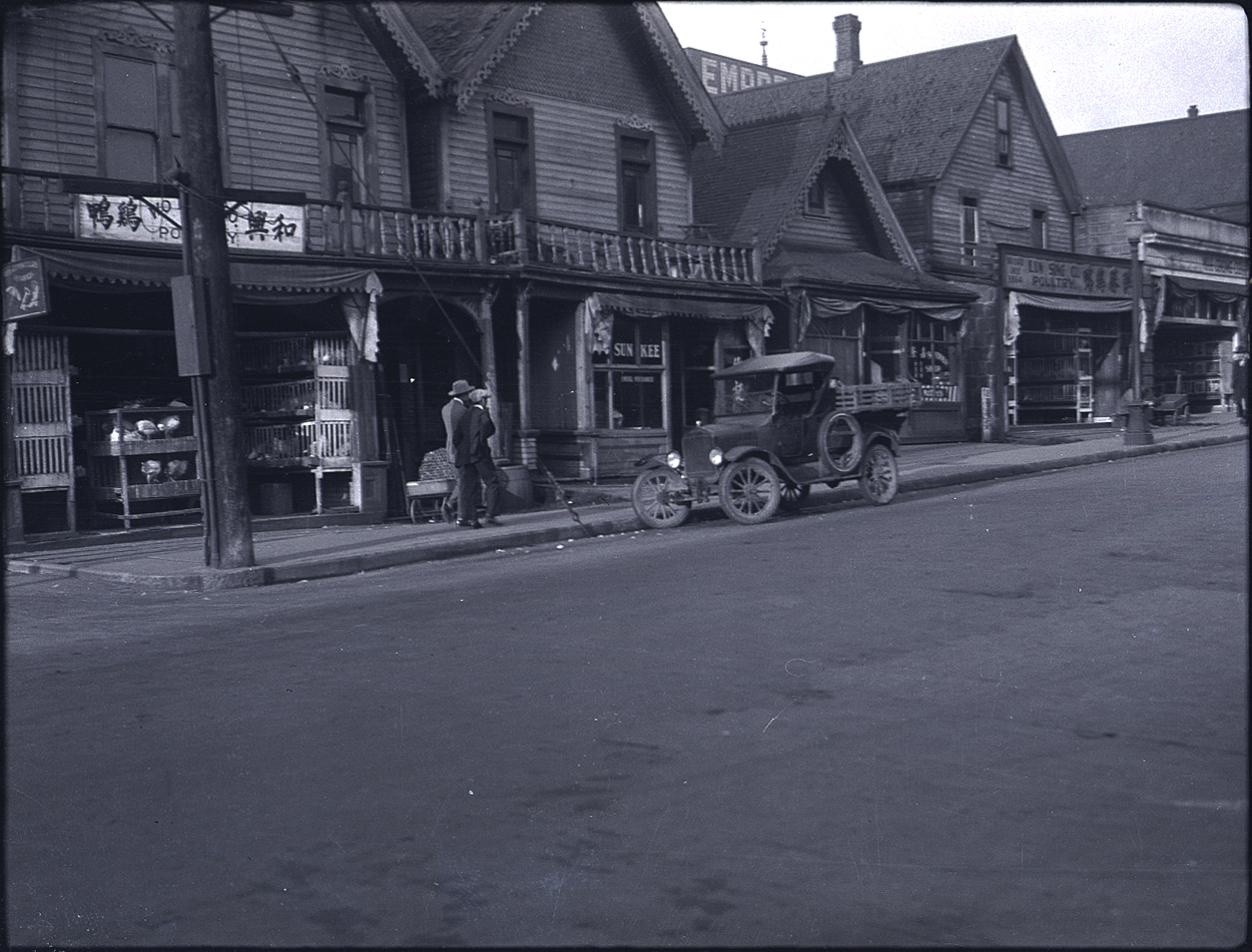
Chinatown, Vancouver, British Columbia, 1927

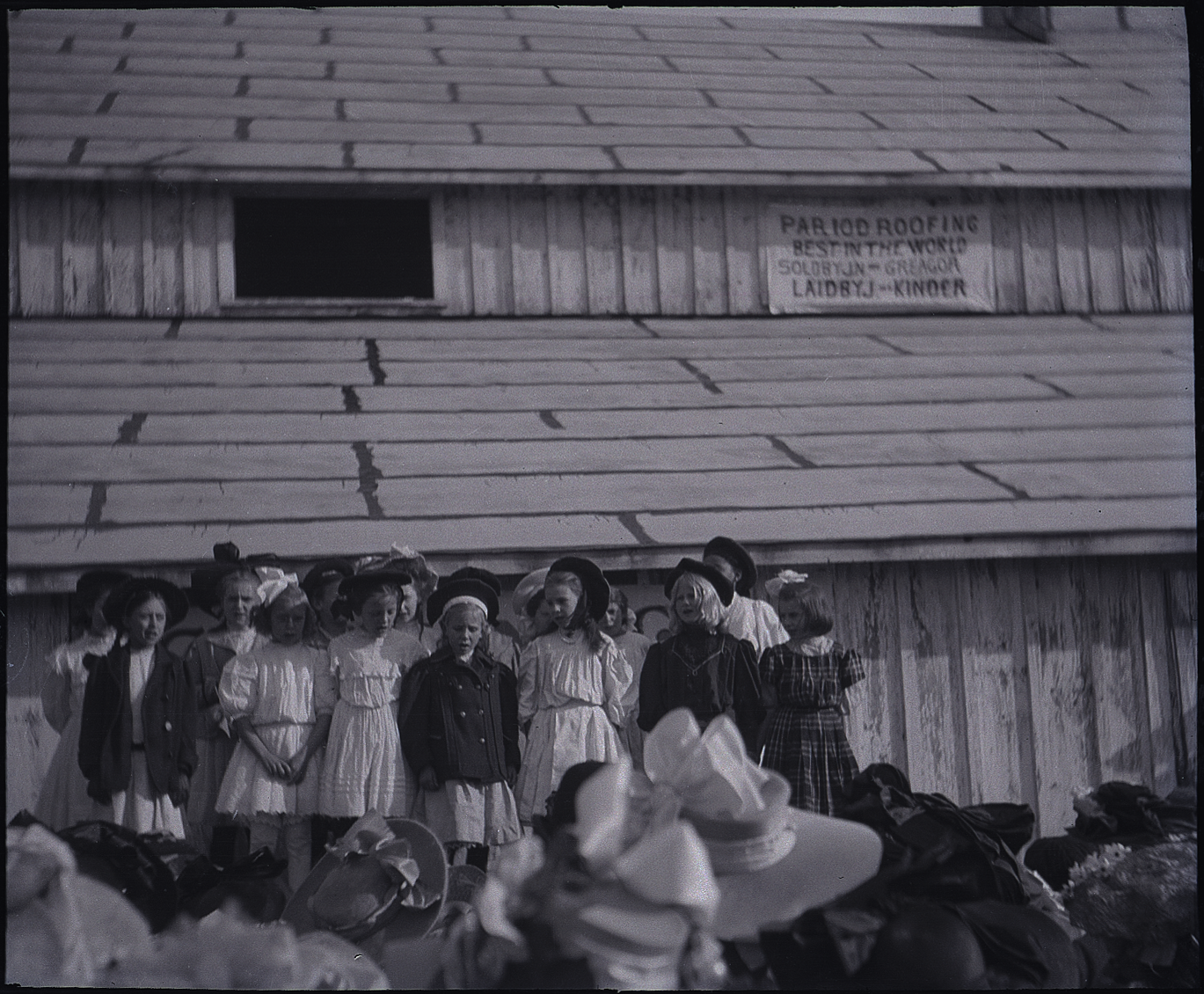
Group of girts, Oakville Fair, October, 1908

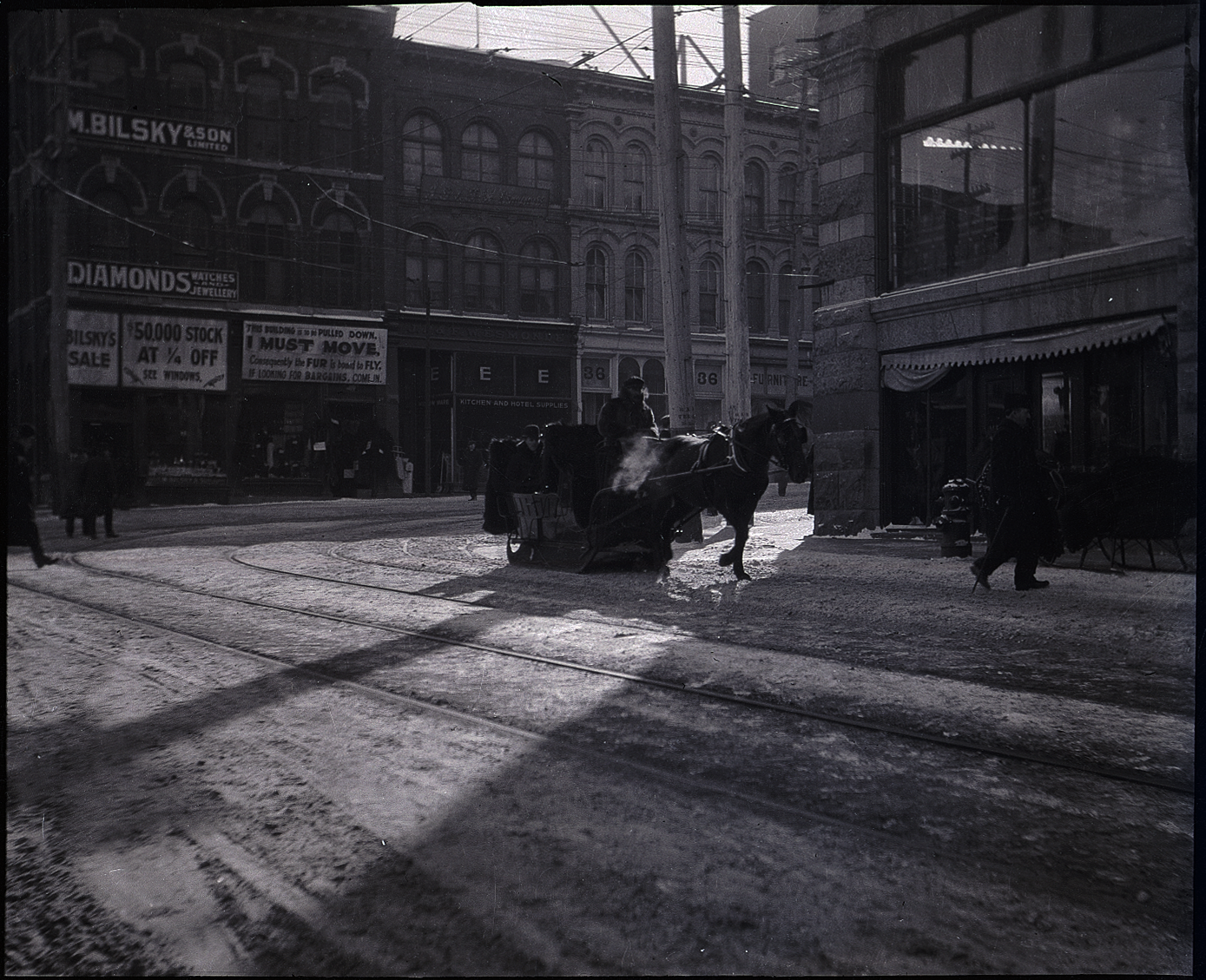
Horsedrawn sleigh on Rideau Street, Ottawa, in front of M. Bilsky and Son store, February 5, 1910

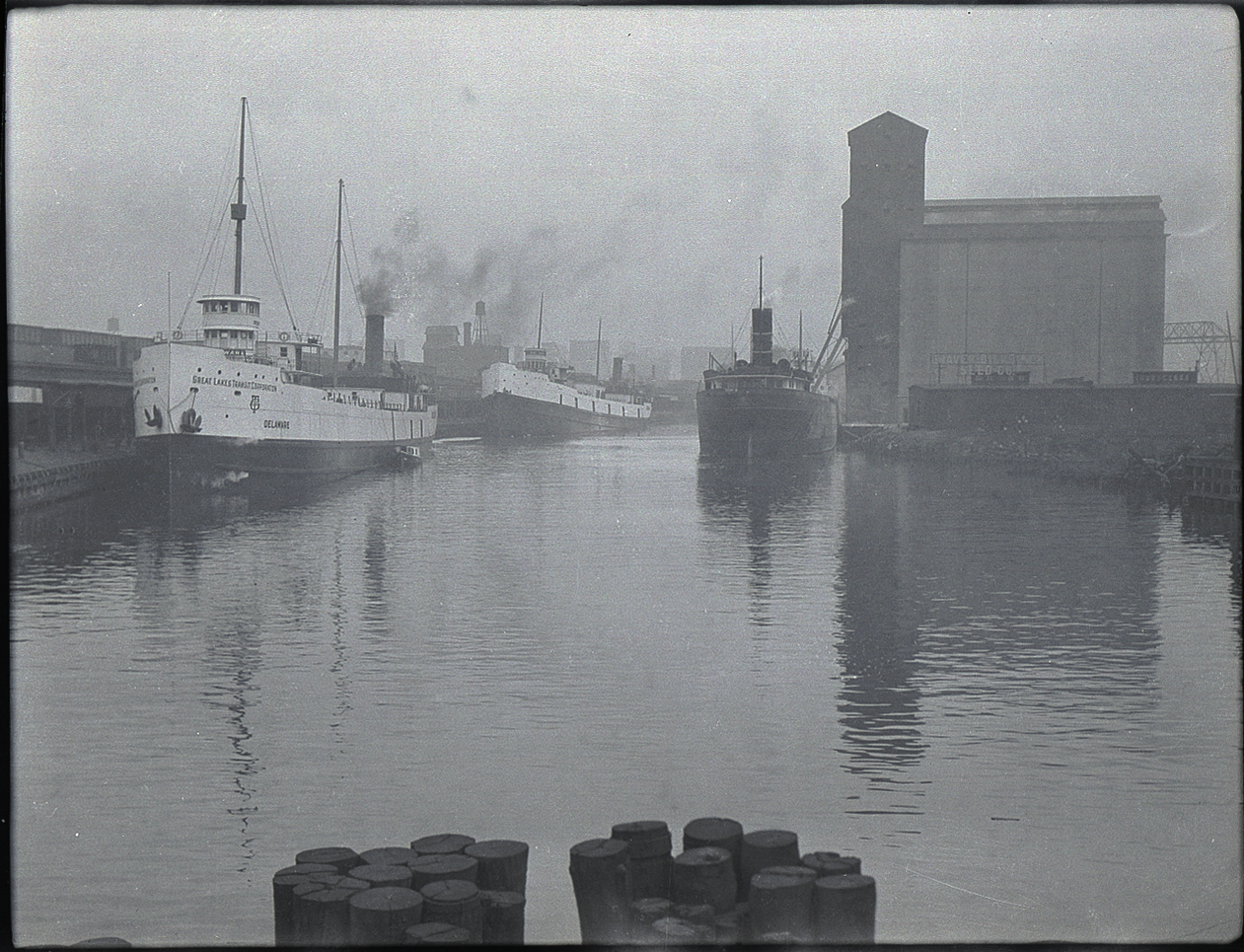
S.S. Delaware, Buffalo harbour, Buffalo, N.Y., 1927
