= Rex Benson (songwriter) =

American songwriter and musician

Rex Benson is an American songwriter and music publisher most associated with Country music.

Benson's career began when he wrote his first songs in 1972 and grew with his first co-publishing agreements in 1979. He has since established the REX BENSON MUSIC GROUP which includes publishing companies for the 3 U.S. performing rights organizations Broadcast Music, Inc. (BMI), the American Society of Composers, Authors and Publishers (ASCAP), and the Society of European Stage Authors and Composers (SESAC). Of the hundreds of songs Benson represents, dozens have been recorded by major-label recording artists and/or placed within programming on major television networks.

== Songwriting ==
Benson has written or co-written songs for recording artists Kenny Rogers, Garth Brooks, Tammy Wynette, Don Williams, Joe Diffie, The Oak Ridge Boys, Mel Tillis, Bobby Vinton, Chesapeake (band), Linda Ronstadt, Rich McCready, Scott Joss, Shirley Myers and others. He also wrote original songs for the Disney Channel TV show Dumbo's Circus.

Benson's songwriting credits include "Unto You This Night" (recorded by Garth Brooks); "Glass Houses" (recorded by Tammy Wynette with Joe Diffie); "Bed of Roses" (recorded by Chesapeake with Linda Ronstadt, by Kenny Rogers with Linda Davis, by Mel Tillis, by Bobby Vinton); "Healing Hands" (recorded by Don Williams); and "What That Means" (recorded by Kenny Rogers with Brad Paisley).

=== Songwriting collaborations ===
Benson developed a writing partnership and worked closely with Steve Gillette for over 15 years; the songs "Unto You This Night", "Glass Houses", "Bed of Roses" and "Healing Hands" were all written in collaboration with Gillette. Other writers with whom Rex has written include Edgar Struble, Earl Clark, Tony Stephens, Fran Holliday, Scott Wray, Buddy Cannon, Lee Bogan, Tim Veazey, Chris Cummings, Scott Eversoll, and Randy Bachman.

== Publishing ==
Benson entered into a Co-Publishing Agreement with Famous Music Corp (now Sony Music) in 1979, opening JESSE ERIN MUSIC and REX TO RICHES MUSIC. He moved full-time into music publishing in 1995 after establishing the REX BENSON MUSIC GROUP, which includes REX BENSON MUSIC (BMI), CHECKS TO REX MUSIC (ASCAP), and REX ROCKS (SESAC).

Benson shared a portion of all publishing rights on songs he had written with Famous Music Corp until 1985, after which he retains all publishing rights on all songs he has written. Benson's publishing credits for songs he has not written include "Buy Me a Rose" (recorded by Kenny Rogers with Alison Krauss and Billy Dean, also recorded by Luther Vandross); "Something In The Air" (recorded by Tracy Lawrence); "What I'm Up Against" (recorded by Chris LeDoux); and "Second Chance" (recorded by Burns and Poe).

=== "Buy Me a Rose" ===
A significant highlight of Benson's publishing career was the signing and placing of the Kenny Rogers #1 single "Buy Me a Rose" in 1999 and then the subsequent Luther Vandross Adult contemporary music hit single version of the same song in 2003, with the latter appearing on the Grammy Award-winning Dance With My Father album. "Buy Me a Rose", written by Jim Funk and Erik Hickenlooper, originally appeared on Rogers' album She Rides Wild Horses in 1999. "Buy Me a Rose" was released as a single and entered the Billboard Hot Country Singles & Tracks chart (now Hot Country Songs) at number 62 on the chart dated October 30, 1999, reaching Number One in May 2000, and spending a total of thirty-seven weeks on the charts. The song was Rogers' first Number One single since 1987. It is also the only Number One single for Billy Dean and Alison Krauss, both of whom received chart credit for their backing vocals. R&B singer Luther Vandross’ cover of "Buy Me a Rose" peaked at #13 on the U.S. Billboard Hot Adult Contemporary Tracks charts in 2004.

=== Film/TV placement and administration ===
Benson aligned himself for administration and film/TV placement in 1998 with PEN Music Group Inc. based in Los Angeles and has placed songs with NBC, CBS, the USA Network, the Disney Channel, FOX, and The WB Television Network.
