= Father Sebastiaan =

American member of the vampire subculture

- Born: January 23, 1975 (age 51); San Diego, California
- Citizenship: USA, French
- Occupations: Fangsmith, Author, Impresario
- Writing career
- Pen name: Father Sebastiaan van Houten, Father Sebastian Todd, Sabretooth
- Genres: Esoterica, erotica
- Subjects: Occult, chaos magic, left-hand path, paranormal, spirituality, vampires
- Notable works: Sanguinomicon, Vampyre Magick, Vampyre Virtues, Vampyre Mysteries, Vampyre Almanac, Strigoi Vii, Mysteries of Paris
- Website: www.fathersebastiaan.com

Father Sebastiaan is an American fangsmith, published author and impresario. He is a former dental assistant working as a "fangsmith," crafting custom made fangs for consumers. He is the founder of the Sabretooth Clan, a fangmaking business, cult, and social network for the vampire subculture, and has worked as an author and co-author of several books on the occult and the vampire subculture.

== Biography ==
Van Houten is an impresario club promoter, creating The New York Vampire Ball in 1996 and The Endless Night Festival in New Orleans in 1998, one of the "largest vampire gatherings in the world". He is noted with writing the first "Black Veils" based on the code of conduct of a club night he managed entitled "Long Black Veil."

== Media ==
Father Sebastiaan is best known for appearances on Travel Channel's Ghost Adventures. He also is a host of the largest Vampire Subculture event the Endless Night Vampire Balls.

== Bibliography ==
=== Books ===
- The Vampyre Almanac 2000 (TheSanguinarium.com Press, 2000)
- Vampyre Sanguinomicon: The Lexicon of the Living Vampire (Weiser, 2010)
- Vampyre Virtues: The Red Veils (TheSanguinarium.com Press, 2011)
- Vampyre Magick: The Grimoire of the Living Vampire (Weiser, 2012)
- The Vampyre Almanac 2012 (TheSanguinarium.com Press, 2012)
- Vampyre Virtues; The Purple Veils (TheSanguinarium.com Press 2013)
- Mysteries of Paris; Darkside of the City of Lights (Bast Books 2014)
- Black Veils; The Vampire Lexicon (Bast Books 2018)
- Black Veils; Master Vampyre Edition (Bast Books 2020)
- Black Veils; Vampyre Tarot (Bast Books 2020)
- In the Words of the Father, Memoirs of the Vampyre Sebastiaan Part 1 the 1990s (Bast Books 2021)

=== Co-authored books ===
- The Vampyre Almanac (Sanguinarium Press, 2000) with Katherine Ramsland and Michelle Belanger.
- V: The Book of the Strigoi VII (Aangel Publishing, 2003) with Layil Umbralux, Madame X.

== Filmography ==
- The Secret Life of Vampires (A&E, 2005)
- Vampire Secrets (History Channel, 2006)
- Vampyres (Avalanche Productions, 2007) documentary based on the book Vampyres: When Reality Goes Beyond Fiction by Laurent Courau
- Ghost Adventures (Travel Channel, 2017)
