= Winter's Majesty =

Studio album by Nox Arcana
- Released: December 12, 2012
- Genre: Christmas music, Neo-medieval, Neoclassical dark wave
- Label: Monolith Graphics
- Producer: Joseph Vargo

Nox Arcana chronology
The Dark Tower (2011)	Winter's Majesty (2012)	Legion of Shadows (2013)

Winter's Majesty is the seventeenth album by Nox Arcana, concluding their winter-themed trilogy, which also includes Winter's Knight (2005) and Winter's Eve (2009).

The music on this album features original and traditional holiday songs, including an instrumental version of "We Three Kings" and a new rendition of "Scarborough Fair" which is presented as a ghost-story with original lyrics and musical arrangements by Joseph Vargo and vocals performed by Jeff Endemann. The overall tone of Winter's Majesty is summarized by one reviewer as "a return to the dark feel of Winter's Knight, while still retaining the lighter elements of Winter's Eve."

== Track listing ==
All music composed and performed by Joseph Vargo

1. "Aquilon's Wish" – 3:52
2. "Tranquility" – 2:49
3. "White Woodlands" – 3:13
4. "Secret Sanctuary" – 3:03
5. "Summon the Wind" – 1:43
6. "Snow in the Shire" – 3:06
7. "Crystal Kingdom" – 3:45
8. "Solstice Spirits" – 3:07
9. "Shelter from the Cold" – 3:51
10. "Angels in the Snow" – 2:47
11. "Scarborough Fair" – 5:47
12. "Ivory Steeds" – 2:33
13. "Winter Haven" – 3:00
14. "Forest Lullaby" – 2:34
15. "Days of Olde" – 2:54
16. "Saturnalia" – 3:28
17. "The Coming of the King" – 3:53
18. "Winter's Majesty" – 3:49
19. "We Three Kings" – 3:17
20. "Polaris" – 2:26
21. "Final Peace" – 3:48
- The song "Final Peace" ends at 2:15. An untitled hidden track begins at 2:40.
