= Darklore Manor =

Studio album by Nox Arcana
- Released: December 15, 2003
- Genres: Gothic, Halloween music, Neoclassical dark wave
- Label: Monolith Graphics

Nox Arcana chronology
Darklore Manor (2003)	Necronomicon (2004)

Professional ratings
Review scores
Source	Rating
Chain D.L.K.	5/5 stars
Fangoria	5/5 stars
Flames Rising	5/5 stars

Darklore Manor is the debut album by neoclassical darkwave musical duo Nox Arcana. It released on December 15, 2003 on the Monolith Graphics label. It features a style of music that bears a similarity to Joseph Vargo's earlier work on the album Born of the Night with Midnight Syndicate, a group that he helped to establish in 1998 prior to his founding of Nox Arcana.

== Musical style & story ==
The music on Darklore Manor consists of piano, violin, pipe organ, harpsichord, with vocal choirs and brief ghostly narrations that invite the listener to "embark on a musical journey throughout the haunted halls of a Victorian mansion". The accompanying booklet features a history about the Darklore family and their "stark and grim abode" of which its "former splendor was lost to the ravages of time" and where "spirits of the dead do not rest easy."

The album was inspired by a real-life haunted house located near Salem, Massachusetts, an old Victorian mansion built in 1889. According to local legend, a curse befell the Darklore family, resulting in many mysterious deaths. Then in 1941, the last of the bloodline, Damon Darklore, his wife Elizabeth, and their daughter Belladonna disappeared without any explanation.

Over the years, the abandoned Darklore Manor became a local haunt, something to scare kids on Halloween and a place for daring teenagers to hang out. In 1968, three teens disappeared after holding a seance there on Halloween. The old manor finally burned to the ground in 1971.

Darklore Manor has inspired others to create haunted houses using the music and storyline as the basis for their Halloween attractions, including the Busch Gardens "Howl-O-Scream" theme park in Tampa, Florida, which features a haunted wedding with Darklore Manor as the setting and atmosphere.

Expanding upon the haunted house story created for the album's liner notes, Joseph Vargo later wrote a novella entitled "The Legend of Darklore Manor." It appears among 12 other short horror stories in the book The Legend of Darklore Manor and Other Tales of Terror.

== Track listing ==
1. "Legend" — 1:49
2. "Darklore Manor" — 2:27
3. "Threshold of the Dead" — 1:18
4. "Trespassers" — 2:52
5. "Veil of Darkness" — 1:55
6. "Sanctuary of Shadows" — 3:12
7. "The Grande Hall" — 1:55
8. "Remnants" — 2:06
9. "Phantom Procession" — 1:46
10. "Belladonna" — 2:41
11. "Nursery Rhyme" — 0:40
12. "Music Box" — 2:08
13. "The Forgotten" — 2:44
14. "Nightmare" — 1:56
15. "No Rest for the Wicked" — 3:12
16. "Omen" — 0:43
17. "Seance" — 2:56
18. "Beyond Midnight" — 3:04
19. "Darkness Immortal" — 3:39
20. "Incantation" — 1:55
21. "Resurrected" — 7:12 (including untitled hidden track at 4:25)

== Copyright complaints ==
In 2008, Nox Arcana announced they had filed suit against German rapper Bushido for copying their music on his album Von der Skyline zum Bordstein zurück (2006) without permission. The album, which ranked Platinum on the German charts contained three musical works from Nox Arcana: "Beyond Midnight" and "No Rest for the Wicked" from Darklore Manor and the song "Cthulhu Rising" from Necronomicon. Von der Skyline zum Bordstein zurück was pulled from major retailers like iTunes and Amazon worldwide.
