= Grimm Tales (album) =

Studio album by Nox Arcana
- Released: April 30, 2008
- Genre: Gothic, Halloween music, neoclassical dark wave, new-age
- Label: Monolith Graphics

Nox Arcana chronology
Shadow of the Raven (2007)	Grimm Tales (2008)	Phantoms of the High Seas (2008)

Professional ratings
Review scores
Source	Rating
Fangoria	5/5 stars
Metal Sound	10/10 stars

Grimm Tales is the ninth studio album by Nox Arcana. Like several of their other albums, this music is also inspired by classic literature. In this case, the folktales of the Brothers Grimm. Instrumentation includes piano, violin, cello, acoustic guitar, glockenspiel, and various wind and percussive instruments, which serve to establish the intended theme. In keeping with the dark fairy tale theme, ominous narrations from a "Witch Queen" and the deep, resonant voice of her male counterpart are featured on several tracks, as well as the raspy voice of an aging Crone as she invokes a magical spell. The release date for this album coincides with Walpurgis Night.

Artist and composer Joseph Vargo also wrote an original fable for this cd. Expressed in poetic verse, it tells of a wicked Witch Queen, Sinestra, who has cast a spell upon the land of Faerie, condemning its inhabitants to a never-ending darkness, and two children who fall asleep one night to awaken in the dark realm. The wayward children set out upon a quest to find a magical "Crystal Key" which is rumored to open a gateway between the "Realm of Fable" and their home. Upon returning home, the children shatter the Crystal Key, breaking the Witch Queen's spell.

Universal Studios' "Halloween Horror Nights" in Orlando, Florida based their 2008 haunted attraction design, "Scary Tales: Once Upon A Nightmare", on the realm of fable explored in Nox Arcana's Grimm Tales album.

== Tracks ==
Music composed and performed by Joseph Vargo and William Piotrowski.

1. "Fable" — 2:03
2. "Twilight" — 2:56
3. "Once Upon a Nightmare" — 3:58
4. "Shadow Forest" — 3:49
5. "Eyes in the Dark" — 2:58
6. "The Hollow" — 1:11
7. "Sylvan Spirits" — 2:45
8. "Wicked Heart" — 2:50
9. "Conjuration" — 1:49
10. "Night Wraiths" — 2:30
11. "Deep in the Woods" — 2:21
12. "The Forgotten Path" — 5:05
13. "Fairy Tale" — 2:09
14. "Crone’s Caverns" — 2:42
15. "Rise to Destiny" — 3:16
16. "Labyrinth of Dreams" — 2:53
17. "Castle of Nightmares" — 4:01
18. "Hall of the Witch Queen" — 3:21
19. "Ave Sinistra" — 4:27
20. "Black Spires" — 2:52
21. "Darkly Everafter" — 3:28

A hidden track features a short dialogue between the evil Witch Queen and her magic mirror.
