= Necronomicon (Nox Arcana album) =

Studio album by Nox Arcana
- Released: October 10, 2004
- Genre: Halloween music, Neoclassical dark wave, Gothic
- Label: Monolith Graphics

Nox Arcana chronology
Darklore Manor (2003)	Necronomicon (2004)	Winter's Knight (2005)

Professional ratings
Review scores
Source	Rating
Fangoria	5/5 stars
Flames Rising	5/5 stars
Temple of Dagon	5/5 stars

Necronomicon is the second album by Neoclassical darkwave/dark ambient musical duo Nox Arcana published by Monolith Graphics on October 10, 2004. The music is inspired by the stories of horror writer H. P. Lovecraft and is a tribute to the Cthulhu Mythos.

== Theme ==
Orchestra, string instruments, drums, pipes, guitars and choirs are accented by ominous chanting, strange sound effects and brief narratives that combine to tell the story of an alchemist who dares to raise an ancient race of otherworldly beings.

The "language of the Old Ones" developed by Lovecraft as a literary plot element but considered by many to be unpronounceable, is effectively spoken aloud by Joseph Vargo on several of the tracks. Vargo, who is a huge fan of Lovecraft's work, also illustrated the CD packaging to appear as he imagined the famed fictional book to be from Lovecraft's descriptions. A hidden track on the CD also contains the phrase "Klaatu barada nikto", a well-known quote from the film The Day the Earth Stood Still and Army of Darkness, which in turn borrowed thematic elements from Lovecraft.

Some of the songs titles are also titles of Lovecraft stories, such as "The Nameless City" and "The Haunter of the Dark", while other song titles such as Azathoth, Dagon, Nyarlathotep, Cthulhu and the Great Old Ones are the names of gods, demons or other supernatural entities from Lovecraft's fiction (the first three are also titles of short stories). A chapter in the book, The Strange Sound of Cthulhu: Music Inspired by the Writings of H. P. Lovecraft was devoted to this album. Nox Arcana's Necronomicon along with their later tribute to the Cthulhu mythos Blackthorn Asylum received mention in Gordon Kerr's book Cthulhu: Dark Fantasy, Horror & Supernatural Movies.

== Track listing ==
1. "Mythos" — 1:58
2. "The Nameless City" — 3:38
3. "Alhazred’s Vision" — 2:55
4. "Necronomicon" — 2:03
5. "Ancient Shadows" — 2:28
6. "Azathoth" — :28
7. "The Black Throne" — 2:01
8. "Nyarlathotep" — :40
9. "Temple of the Black Pharaoh 3:50
10. "Eldritch Rites" — 1:33
11. "The Haunter of the Dark" — 2:38
12. "The Awakening" — 2:59
13. "Yog-sothoth" — 1:00
14. "Guardian of the Gate" — 3:26
15. "Lords of Darkness" — 2:08
16. "Dagon" — :35
17. "The Stars Align" — 1:57
18. "Cthulhu" — :55
19. "Ritual of Summoning" — 1:21
20. "Cthulhu Rising" — 2:38
21. "The Great Old Ones" — 8:54 (includes untitled hidden track)

== Copyright complaints ==
In 2008, Nox Arcana announced they had filed suit against German rapper Bushido for copying their music on his album Von der Skyline zum Bordstein zurück (2006) without permission. The album, which ranked Platinum on the German charts contained three musical works from Nox Arcana: "Beyond Midnight" and "No Rest for the Wicked" from Darklore Manor and the song "Cthulhu Rising" from Necronomicon. Von der Skyline zum Bordstein zurück was pulled from major retailers like iTunes and Amazon worldwide.
