= Von der Skyline zum Bordstein zurück =

Studio album by Bushido
- Released: 4 September 2006
- Recorded: Highlight Productions / Kingsize
- Genre: German hip hop
- Length: 74:55
- Label: ersguterjunge/Universal
- Producers: Bushido & Kingsize

Bushido chronology
Staatsfeind Nr. 1 (2005)	Von der Skyline zum Bordstein zurück (2006)	7 (2007)

Premium edition cover

Singles from Von der Skyline zum Bordstein zurück
- 1. "Von der Skyline zum Bordstein zurück" Released: 18 August 2006; 2. "Sonnenbank Flavour" Released: 27 October 2006; 3. "Janine" Released: 9 February 2007

Professional ratings
Review scores
Source	Rating
AllMusic	4/5 stars
laut.de	4/5 stars

Von der Skyline zum Bordstein zurück ("From the Skyline Back to the Curb") is the fourth solo album by German rapper Bushido. The title alludes to his first solo album, Vom Bordstein bis zur Skyline (2003). It was released as both a standard and "platinum" edition.

== Information ==
The album contains no features and was entirely produced by Bushido himself, except for two tracks. It spawned three singles: "Von der Skyline zum Bordstein zurück", "Sonnenbank Flavour" and "Janine".

In an interview, Bushido said that it would be his last album, however, he went on to release a new one in 2007. The album received platinum status in Germany for more than 200,000 units sold and gold in Austria for more than 10,000 units sold.

== Legal issues ==
American band Nox Arcana accused Bushido of sampling three songs off them without permission. The songs appear on their albums Darklore Manor (2003) and Necronomicon (2004).

French band Dark Sanctuary also sued the rapper for sampling eight of their tracks without consent. On 23 March 2010, he was convicted by German courts to a condemnation and was obliged to stop the sales of the concerned albums, singles and samplers, including Von der Skyline zum Bordstein zurück. In addition to that, he was bound to recall and destroy all unsold copies.

== Track listing ==
Tracks 1–7 and 9–23 are produced by Bushido. Tracks 8 and 9 are produced by Kingsize.

No.	Title	Translation	Length
1.	"Intro"		2:08
2.	"Universal Soldier"		3:43
3.	"Weißt du?"	You know?	3:39
4.	"Goldrapper"		3:54
5.	"Sonnenbank Flavour"	Sunbed flavour	3:40
6.	"Kurt Cobain"		3:28
7.	"Wenn ein Gangster weint"	When a gangster cries	3:32
8.	"Ich schlafe ein"	I fall asleep	3:16
9.	"Hast du was, bist du was"	If you've got it, you are it	4:08
10.	"Alphatier"	Alpha male	3:43
11.	"Bloodsport"		4:01
12.	"Sex in the City"		4:02
13.	"Dealer vom Block"	Dealer from the block	3:48
14.	"Bravo Cover"		3:10
15.	"Ich regele das"	I'll fix it	3:44
16.	"Kickboxer"		3:26
17.	"Blaues Licht"	Blue light	3:59
18.	"Janine"		3:56
19.	"Kein Fenster"	No window	3:46
20.	"Von der Skyline zum Bordstein zurück"	From the skyline back to the curb	4:03
21.	"Outro"		1:37

Limited edition bonus tracks
No.	Title	Translation	Length
22.	"Wieder von der Skyline zum Bordstein zurück"	From the skyline back to the curb again	3:53
23.	"Knight Rider"		3:48

Platinum edition
No.	Title	Producer(s)	Length
1.	"Electrofaust" (Electro fist)	DJ Ilan	2:12
2.	"Bushido" (featuring Billy13)	Bushido	4:49
3.	"Bei Nacht" (At night)	Bushido	3:23
4.	"Berlin"	Bushido	3:13
5.	"Vaterland" (Fatherland) (featuring Fler)	Bushido	3:23
6.	"Pitch Bitch"	Bushido & DJ Ilan	0:42
7.	"Mein Revier" (My territory)	Bushido & DJ Ilan	4:43
8.	"Renn" (Run) (featuring A.i.d.S.)	Sido	4:37
9.	"Gemein wie 10" (Mean like 10)	Bushido & DJ Ilan	3:50
10.	"Streetwars"	Bushido	0:34
11.	"Asphalt" (featuring Fler)	Bushido	4:04
12.	"Stupid White Man" (featuring Sahira)	Bushido	4:42
13.	"Zukunft" (Future) (featuring Fler)	Bushido	3:44
14.	"Vom Bordstein bis zur Skyline" (From the curb to the skyline) (featuring Fler)	Bushido	3:44
15.	"Outro" (featuring Sahira)	Bushido & DJ Ilan	3:02
16.	"Berlin" (remix featuring Kay One & Chakuza)	Bushido	2:13
17.	"Bei Nacht" (remix featuring Nyze & Kay One)	Bushido	3:28
18.	"Sonnenbank Flavour (Faible Remix)"	Faible	3:58
19.	"Es ist OK" (It's OK) (featuring Nyze)		3:44

Notes

- The platinum edition contains two discs: The first features the actual track listing (without the limited edition) and the second disc features songs from the album Vom Bordstein bis zur Skyline (2003), censored and some songs missing as the original album was banned in Germany. Additionally, it features three remixes and the song "Es ist OK", from Nyze's album Geben & Nehmen (2007).

== Samples ==
A list of uncredit song samples are availed here.

- "Intro"
  - Excerpt from Layer Cake
- "Universal Soldier"
  - "Charis" by Elend
- "Weißt du?"
  - Beyond Midnight" by Nox Arcana
- "Sonnenbank Flavour"
  - "Epitaph" by Antimatter
- "Kurt Cobain"
  - "No Rest for the Wicked" by Nox Arcana
- "Ich schlafe ein"
  - "L'Instant Funebre" by Dark Sanctuary
- "Hast du was, bist du was"
  - "Les Larmes Du Meprise" by Dark Sanctuary
- "Bloodsport"
  - "Reve Mortuaire" by Dark Sanctuary
- "Sex in the City"
  - "L'autre Monde" by Dark Sanctuary
- "Dealer vom Block"
  - "L'Arrogance" by Dark Sanctuary
  - "Berlin" by Bushido
- "Bravo Cover"
  - "Valley of the Pain" by Dark Sanctuary
- "Kickboxer"
  - Excerpt from Kickboxer
- "Blaues Licht"
  - "Cthulhu Rising" by Nox Arcana
  - Excerpt from Rambo III
- "Janine"
  - "Les Mémoires Blessées" by Dark Sanctuary
- "Kein Fenster"
  - "Loin Des Mortels" by Dark Sanctuary
- "Von der Skyline zum Bordstein zurück"
  - "Terminal" by Antimatter
- "Wieder von der Skyline zum Bordstein zurück"
  - "The Champ" by The Mohawks
  - "Vie Ephémère" by Dark Sanctuary

== Personnel ==
Credits for Von der Skyline zum Bordstein zurück adapted from Discogs:

- Artwork – Ben Baumgarten
- Mastered by – Dirk Niemeier
- Photography by – Kasskara
- Recorded by, mixed by – Kingsize

== Year-end charts ==
Year	Country	Chart	Rank
2006	Germany	IFPI	#46
2007	Germany	IFPI	#81
