= Shadow of the Raven =

Studio album by Nox Arcana
- Released: August 20, 2007
- Genre: Gothic, Halloween music, Neoclassical
- Label: Monolith Graphics

Nox Arcana chronology
Blood of the Dragon (2006)	Shadow of the Raven (2007)	Grimm Tales (2008)

Professional ratings
Review scores
Source	Rating
Fangoria	5/5 stars
Flames Rising	5/5 stars
Gothic Beauty	5/5 stars

Shadow of the Raven is the eighth album by gothic duo Nox Arcana. This time the composers Joseph Vargo and William Piotrowski honor Edgar Allan Poe, the author of "The Masque of the Red Death", "The Murders in the Rue Morgue", "The Fall of the House of Usher, "The Tell-Tale Heart" and other tales of suspense and horror, as well as the famous poem "The Raven". Nox Arcana's Shadow of the Raven was cited in the academic book Handbook of Intermediality: Literature - Image - Sound - Music in reference to the vast legacy of Poe's works in music.

The classical, symphonic instrumental music is primarily made up of piano, violin, pipe organ, harpsichord and some music box melodies that have been described as suspenseful and melancholy. The album is introduced with a brief narrative. Subtle yet effective sound effects are peppered throughout the music, providing accompaniment to several of Poe's most famous literary works.

Select songs from Shadow of the Raven have been featured in several plays based on Edgar Allan Poe's works "The Fall of the House of Usher" and "The Cask of Amontillado" performed in the US and Canada. Nox Arcana's composition "The Pit and the Pendulum" was performed in period costume by a 14-piece orchestra. The album was used as background music for From Out That Shadow: The Life and Legacy of Edgar Allan Poe, a museum exhibition commemorating the bicentennial of Poe's birth, hosted by the Harry Ransom Center and the University of Virginia.

== Track listing ==
Music composed and performed by Joseph Vargo and William Piotrowski.

1. ”Darkest Hour" — 1:41
2. "Melancholia" — 3:01
3. "Descent Into Madness" — 3:25
4. "The House of Usher" — 2:04
5. "Madeline’s Lament" — 2:14
6. "Haunted Memories" — 4:17
7. "Annabel Lee" — 3:09
8. "Legacy of Sorrow" — 2:34
9. "The Black Cat" — 0:55
10. "The Cask of Amontillado" — 3:15
11. "Mysteries of the Night" — 4:03
12. "Midnight Dreary" — 1:09
13. "The Raven" — 3:20
14. "Morbid Reminiscence" — 3:13
15. "Lenore" — 3:24
16. "A Dream Within A Dream" — 2:59
17. "The Tell-Tale Heart" — 1:20
18. "Murders in the Rue Morgue" — 2:47
19. "The Pit and the Pendulum" — 3:16
20. "Masque of the Red Death" — 4:43
21. "Nevermore" — 6:16
- The song "Nevermore" ends at 3:30, but it is followed by two hidden tracks: the first hidden track starts at 4:00 and ends at 4:35; the second hidden track starts at 5:05 and ends at 6:16. These hidden tracks consist of sounds of digging and muffled screams as of someone being buried alive. This seems to reference a few of Poe's stories, The Cask of Amontillado, The Fall of the House of Usher, The Black Cat, in which the victim was either buried or entombed alive.
