= Seattle-Tacoma-Everett Girl Love =

American website

- Website type: Blog
- Available in: English
- Headquarters: {{{location_country}}}
- Creator: Jack McLellan
- Current status: Defunct

Seattle-Tacoma-Everett Girl Love was a website founded by American blogger Jack McClellan.

== History ==
Seattle-Tacoma-Everett Girl Love was created by Washington-based blogger Jack McClellan. The website stated that its primary purpose was "to promote association, friendship; and legal, nonsexual, consensual touch (hugging, cuddling, etc) between men and girls". It featured non-sexual images of adolescent and little girls, the latter of which McClellan would abbreviate to "LGs". McClellan stated that he had created the website as a form of therapy and had no intentions of doing anything illegal.

In March 2007, a civilian group filed a lawsuit in order to shut the website down. The lawsuit was ultimately unsuccessful, with the court finding that the contents of the website was protected by the First Amendment of the U.S. Constitution. The website was later shut down by McClellan's internet service provider (ISP) Network Solutions on March 28 and then brought back under the domain stegl, hosted by Montreal ISP Epifora. In May, McClellan emigrated from the state of Washington to Oregon, and from there to California, amid what he described as a "media hysteria" regarding his website. Upon reaching California, he renamed the website to Los Angeles Girl Love.

In early August, a California judge imposed an injunction that prohibited McClellan from being within 10 yards (9.1 meters) of any person under the age of 18 in the state or any place where they might congregate, which later that month resulted in McClellan spending 10 days in jail for having been near a childcare center in Los Angeles. The ruling, which went beyond what was requested by the attorneys who filed the case, was criticized by civil libertarians as being too broad and effectively banning McClellan from being anywhere in the state. The same injunction was later determined to be invalid due to the fact that the judge had failed to give McClellan proper notice of the hearing where the merits of the injunction would be argued. The judge later revised the order while citing concerns about its constitutionality.

Later that month, the injunction became permanent and further extended the restraining order to three years. In late August, McClellan stated that he had to leave the state of California because of the ruling. As a car dweller, he told the Crime Library that the order made it impossible for him to perform everyday activities such as eating at restaurants. As of September 12, McClellan had already flown out of the state.

=== After 2007 ===
McClellan was never convicted of any sexual crime. As a result of the controversy, California's state legislature passed a law in 2008 that made it illegal to publish certain types of information about a child on the internet with the intent that another person imminently use such information to commit a crime against the child. As of 2009, the stegl domain was down. In 2013, he told a local news organization that he had stopped his activities with online websites.
