= Transylvania (Nox Arcana album) =

Studio album by Nox Arcana
- Released: October 21, 2005
- Genre: Halloween music, Gothic, Dark ambient, Dark wave
- Label: Monolith Graphics

Nox Arcana chronology
Winter's Knight (2005)	Transylvania (2005)	Carnival of Lost Souls (2006)

Professional ratings
Review scores
Source	Rating
Chain D.L.K.	5/5 stars
Fangoria	5/5 stars
Metal Invader	5/5 stars
Metal Sound	7.5/10 stars

Transylvania is the fourth album by gothic duo Nox Arcana. This album is a musical tribute to Bram Stoker's Dracula. The duo employs their musical storytelling concept to take their listeners through chapters of the novel—beginning with Jonathan Harker's voyage into the Carpathian Mountains, a ride in Dracula's ominous black coach, arriving at Castle Dracula, a rendezvous with Dracula's brides, and a foray into a gypsy encampment, and finally into the lair of the vampire.

As with previous CDs, the booklet artwork is supplied by Joseph Vargo, with illustrations and quotes from Harker and Van Helsing. The duo's website also offers some historical background for the inspiration of their album.

Nox Arcana took their subject matter very seriously when composing the music for Transylvania. The album was also used to score a televised edition of the 1922 silent film Nosferatu.

In 2012, "Night of the Wolf" from the Transylvania album was broadcast on the FOX TV show So You Think You Can Dance.

In 2013, a young Corsican filmmaker Ariakina Ettori won first place in the L'Institut Régional du Cinéma et de l'Audiovisuel (IRCA) with her modern version of "Little Red Riding Hood" inspired by Nox Arcana's song "Night of the Wolf." The film school credits Joseph Vargo and Nox Arcana for their unconditional support.

Several songs from Transylvania are used during live performances and featured on a videotron at Six Flags theme parks. A theme attraction in Mexico created their castle of vampires based on the Transylvania album.

In 2016, Nox Arcana's musical composition "Night of the Wolf" was performed by a live orchestra as the centerpiece for Cirque des Voix, a show that combines orchestral and choral music with contemporary circus acts.

== Track listing ==
1. "Transylvania Overture" – 2:01
2. "The Voyage" – 2:54
3. "Gossamer Mist" – 2:39
4. "The Black Coach" – 2:35
5. "Sentinels of Stone" – 0:44
6. "Into the Shadows" – 2:59
7. "Castle Dracula" – 2:56
8. "Visitors in the Night" – 0:57
9. "Brides to Darkness" – 2:34
10. "Grande Masquerade" – 4:14
11. "Memento Mori" – 2:28
12. "The Howling" – 1:20
13. "Nocturne" – 2:55
14. "Bats in the Belfry" – 0:35
15. "Gothic Sanctum" – 2:43
16. "Gypsy Caravan" – 4:13
17. "From Dusk Till Dawn – 0:53
18. "Night of the Wolf" – 3:59
19. "Echoes from the Crypt" – 2:37
20. "Shadow Hunters" – 2:51
21. "Lair of the Vampire" – 6:29 (includes hidden track)
