= Phantoms of the High Seas =

Studio album by Nox Arcana
- Released: October 13, 2008
- Genre: Gothic, neoclassical dark wave, Halloween music, new age
- Label: Monolith Graphics

Nox Arcana chronology
Grimm Tales (2008)	Phantoms of the High Seas (2008)	Blackthorn Asylum (2009)

Professional ratings
Review scores
Source	Rating
Fangoria	5/5 stars
Metal Sound	8/10 stars
Spawn of Metal	9.4/10 stars

Phantoms of the High Seas is the tenth album by Nox Arcana. The theme of the album is pirate lore and stories of ghost ships.

== Tracks ==
- Music composed and performed by Joseph Vargo and William Piotrowski. Lyrics by Joseph Vargo.
1. "Dead Men Tell No Tales" — 2:26
2. "The High Seas" — 2:56
3. "Edge of the World" — 4:21
4. "Pirates" — 5:10
5. "The Gallows Jig" — 1:50
6. "Crossfire" — 3:00
7. "Oblivion" — 3:00
8. "Racing the Wind" — 4:15
9. "Siren’s Call" — 2:33
10. "Trove Island" — 3:23
11. "Against the Storm" — 3:21
12. "Lords of the Deep" — 2:27
13. "Maelstrom" — 1:22
14. "Out of the Mist" — 3:02
15. "Still Waters" — 2:22
16. "Black Sails" — 3:01
17. "Fate of the Tempest" — 4:11
18. "The Fog Rolls In" — 1:32
19. "Widow’s Harbor" — 2:56
20. "Ghost Ship" — 2:47
21. "Skull and Crossbones" — 3:11 (+hidden track)

Notes

- Vocals on "Fate of the Tempest" were performed by Ty Cook.
