= Blackthorn Asylum =

Studio album by Nox Arcana
- Released: June 21, 2009
- Genre: Gothic, Halloween music, Dark wave
- Label: Monolith Graphics

Nox Arcana chronology
Phantoms of the High Seas (2008)	Blackthorn Asylum (2009)	Zombie Influx (2009)

Professional ratings
Review scores
Source	Rating
Fangoria	5/5 stars
Flames Rising	5/5 stars
Metal Sound	8/10 stars

Blackthorn Asylum is the eleventh album by dark ambient duo Nox Arcana. The musical theme is described as being "set in an abandoned sanitarium for the criminally insane where the doctors conducted horrible experiments on the inmates." Instrumentation features classical piano and dark atmospheric tonal effects.

This is also the last Nox Arcana album to be released with William Piotrowski as an official member; he left the same year for his career as a film score composer, with Vargo continuing the project as a solo act. Despite this, Piotrowski remains with the project as an additional instrumentalist and studio engineer, and remains credited on all future Nox Arcana albums in such roles.

Nox Arcana once again pays homage to H.P. Lovecraft as they did with their second album Necronomicon, stating "We set Blackthorn Asylum in the 1930s and revisit the dark domain of H.P. Lovecraft. The plot builds upon Lovecraft’s short story "From Beyond" and adds some creepy new twists." And, as with almost every other album this band has released, this album conceals a puzzle, along with a storyline that expounds upon Lovecraft's story.

"Alice!" a play based on Alice's Adventures in Wonderland and Through the Looking Glass by Lewis Carroll, performed by The Chaotic Theatre Company, Austin, TX, was set in Nox Arcana's Blackthorn Asylum. A theme park in Mexico created their "Demencia" Halloween attraction entirely based the Blackthorn Asylum album.

== Track listing ==
1. "Legacy of Darkness" — 2:09
2. "Blackthorn Asylum" — 3:12
3. "Sanitarium Gates" — 3:06
4. "Abandoned" — 2:54
5. "Threshold of Madness" — 3:41
6. "Tapestry of Decay" — 3:06
7. "Hidden Horrors" — 2:32
8. "When Darkness Falls" — 3:24
9. "Shock Treatment" — :55
10. "Fractured Memories" — 2:27
11. "Phantasmagoria" — 3:27
12. "Creeper" — 2:12
13. "Sanity Slipping" — 3:03
14. "Dementia 13" — 3:23
15. "Solitary Confinement" — 3:24
16. "Frenzy" — 2:45
17. "The Condemned" — 3:04
18. "Spiders in the Attic" — 4:24
19. "From Beyond" — :47
20. "Essence of Evil" — 2:55
21. "Fade to Black" — 3:45
