= Vampire Secrets =

- Written by: Josh Rosen; Katherine Ramsland
- Directed by: Diana Zaslaw
- Narrated by: Corey Burton
- Country of origin: United States
- Original language: English

Production
- Producer: Diana Zaslaw
- Cinematography: Yoram Astrakhan
- Running time: 100 minutes

Original release
- Network: History Channel
- Release: 2006

Vampire Secrets is a 2006 docudrama about the mythology and lifestyle of vampires, produced by Indigo Films for the History Channel, and narrated by Corey Burton.

The documentary features the history of vampires from Indian (Hindu goddess Kali), Greek, and Chinese origins, and references to the Bible and ancient Mesopotamia.

== Content ==
Other topics include:

- Bram Stoker's 1897 novel, Dracula
- James Spalding, a Scotsman, 1632
- Elizabeth Báthory
- Haidamaque, Hungary, 1715
- Blood ritual
- Anne Rice's vampire novels
- Vampire: The Masquerade: Rod Ferrell (VTM role-player from Murray, Kentucky who thought he was a real vampire), killed two people in Eustis, Florida, USA, and was sentenced to death (but reduced to life imprisonment)
- Sex appeal: Nosferatu (1922 film), 1931 film with Béla Lugosi (The Master of Horror), Vampirella, Demonlover; and others.
- Vampire underground and gothic subculture: Susan Walsh (researcher for The Village Voice) who falls for a purported "living vampire" (Christian) and disappears in January 1996
- Psychic vampire (Rasputin, aura photography, Joe H. Slate), Sanguine vampire lifestylers

The documentary also features commentaries by authors Katherine Ramsland, and J. Gordon Melton, parapsychologist Loyd Auerbach, psychic vampire author and spokesperson Michelle Belanger, Father Sebastiaan, forensic biologist Mark Benecke, professor Thomas Garza, and others.

== Cast ==
- Deborah Rombaut as Demon Woman
- Adrian Balbontin as Gaspard Robilette
- Elise Angell as Maid
- Lyndsey Nelson as Susan Walsh
- Scott Updegrave as Richard Wendorf
- Christa Bella as Elizabeth Bathory
- Jack Sale as Rod Ferrell
- Thais Harris as Katherine Ramsland
- Dan Higgins as James Spalding
- George Mauro as Bram Stoker
- Kari Wishingrad as Bathory Chambermaid
- Jeffery Davis as Vampire
- Justin Rodgers Hall as Vampire
- Peter Stack as Ficzk

== Reception ==
The film received rather poor critical reception, DVD Talk finding it "redundant".
