= Vampyre Sanguinomicon: The Lexicon of the Living Vampire =

2010 book by Father Sebastiaan

- Author: Father Sebastiaan
- Language: English
- Published: 2010 (Weiser)
- Publication place: United States
- ISBN: 978-1578634804

Vampyre Sanguinomicon: The Lexicon of the Living Vampire is an occult book by Father Sebastiaan that explores the vampire subculture. The book was published in 2010 by Weiser and contains a foreword written by the occult writer Konstantinos.

== Synopsis ==
The book discussed the traditions, movement, and philosophies of the vampire lifestyle and subculture.

The book also emphasises "five principles" that vampires (Strigoi Vii) should follow:

1. Law; Strigoi Vii are not criminals.
2. Responsibility; all Strigoi Vii are adults.
3. Blood; the Strigoi Vii see blood as a metaphor for something far more subtle.
4. Quest; the Strigoi Vii have a unified cause—the current and the quest
5. Secrecy; the Strigoi Vii are an open secret, hidden in plain sight.

== Reception ==
Library Journal stated that "Teens and Goths may find this an interesting but slow read, and New Age practitioners may also be intrigued. Some patrons will recognize Father Sebastiaan's name from his television appearances. A novel choice only for large public libraries looking to expand their paranormal collections."

Katherine Ramsland stated that "Vampire fads come and go, emerging each decade in some new form, but for those for whom the vampiric mystique is a calling, the choices inspired become a life path. Vampyre Sanguinomicon offers a compelling and elegant presentation of the history, rituals, and customs of a specific spiritual movement. It has the quality of permanence, and it will likely make an enduring contribution to sanguinary lore".

Facing North stated that "If you are interested in Vampyre spirituality this book is definitely for you; Father Sebastiaan takes you on a journey learning about the lifestyle and spirituality of the Vampyre including meditations, oaths, morals and behavior guidelines. Definitely worth a read if this is your interest!"

CBS (WFOR-TV) also discussed the book, praising it as a lifestyle guide and the five principles for vampires.
