= House of Nightmares =

Studio album by Buzz-Works & Nox Arcana
- Released: October 1, 2010
- Genre: Dark ambient, Neoclassical dark wave, Halloween music
- Label: Monolith Graphics

Buzz-Works & Nox Arcana chronology
Theater of Illusion (2010)	House of Nightmares (2010)	The Dark Tower (2011)

Professional ratings
Review scores
Source	Rating
Gravedigger's Local 16	5/5 stars
Malefick Music	5/5 stars

House of Nightmares is a collaboration album by Joseph Vargo of Nox Arcana and Jeff Hartz of Buzz-Works. It is the fifteenth release from Nox Arcana. The theme of the album is that of an old manor house next to a cemetery haunted by the spirits of the dead whose presence is most evident on October 30, the Devil's Night, and Halloween night.

Written and performed by Jeff Hartz and Joseph Vargo. Produced by Joseph Vargo. Engineered by William Piotrowski.

== Track listing ==
1. House of Nightmares - 2:44
2. Night Closes In - 3:08
3. Book of the Dead - 1:12
4. Darkness Rising - 1:29
5. Dead Time - 3:10
6. The Ruins - 2:23
7. The Forgotten Crypt - 1:46
8. Well of Souls - 2:57
9. The Descent - 1:48
10. The Summoning - 1:49
11. Ancient Evil - 2:49
12. The Black Abyss - 1:22
13. Shadow Dwellers - 3:36
14. Bridge Between Worlds - 2:44
15. On the Prowl - 2:41
16. Devil's Night - 2:50
17. The Nether Realm - 1:22
18. Hallow's Eve - 2:12
19. Unleashed - 2:29
