= Gothic (Nox Arcana album) =

Studio album by Nox Arcana
- Released: October 20, 2015
- Genre: Gothic rock, dark ambient, dark wave
- Label: Monolith Graphics
- Producer: Joseph Vargo

Nox Arcana chronology
Ebonshire 2 (2014)	Gothic (2015)	Ebonshire 3 (2015)

Gothic is the 22nd concept album by Nox Arcana. The album opens with an introductory narration, describing terms of an inheritance of an old gothic mansion called Grimstone Manor. The story described in narrative form and in the liner notes contains elements of danger and romance like that of a 19th-century Gothic novel. Musically, the album features Nox Arcana's brand of dark ambient music, with the use of pipe organ, violins, harpsichord, piano, choirs, and other instrumentation, representing a musical journey through the haunted mansion.

== Story ==
A gothic mansion standing in a vast graveyard and its owner, Victor Grimstone, was subject to rumors. With Victor Grimstone dying under mysterious circumstances, his property, which included the house, graveyard, and their secrets are bequeathed to an unidentified heir on one condition: the heir must be locked in the mansion from dusk till dawn.

The nameless heir proceeds to the mansion on a specified date and notices all that Grimstone has left. Exploring every room, the heir visits a nursery where a stack of toy blocks form a message and riddle to decipher. It is here where a spirit warns the heir of caution when exploring the residence's crypt, as the house' former inhabitants, who are buried there, become active during the late hours of night and will kill anyone who visited the place, but will not harm those who learn of the secret.

Continuing the exploration, the heir heads to the portrait gallery where he/she sees portraits of his/her ancestors. A flash of lightning makes the paintings seem to be brought to life, with ghostly forms emerging from the portrait, their skeletal hands trying to reach the heir.

In the foyer of the manor where the heir entered, a curtained doorway beneath the grand staircase hides a wrought iron gate that leads to another hall. Entering it, the heir discovers another curtained doorway concealing a second gate to second hall that contains a stone staircase that leads down to the basement. The basement itself contains a passageway to the Grimstone burial crypt in the far depths of the mansion. Upon exploration, the heir discovers the burial crypt, seeing the names of the ancestors carved into the markers. The spirits of the ancestors appear and block the heir's escape, trying to take his/her soul.

However, with the heir solving the puzzle and deciphering the message, the spirits could not harm him/her and fade into oblivion. The heir returns to the main floor to discover the foyer doors unlocked and the sun rising, and has finally survived the ordeal of the manor.

=== Video game ===
During Halloween 2020, Joseph Vargo released another game on YouTube entitled "The Mystery of Grimstone Manor". While it contains the same elements from the album and some other challenges, it also revealed that Victor Grimstone was the heir's uncle who was involved with the occult, which makes him and the heir's family estranged from one another. The date of visiting the mansion is revealed to be a stormy October 31 night.

== Track listing ==
1. Testament — 2:07
2. Grimstone Manor — 2:53
3. Ashes To Ashes — 2:30
4. Forgotten By Time — 2:53
5. The Portrait Gallery — 2:48
6. Into The Darkness — 3:14
7. Familiar Haunts — 3:50
8. The House Beyond The Graveyard — 1:01
9. Unhallowed Halls — 3:02
10. The Doll House — 2:31
11. Melancholy Memories — 2:51
12. Stir Of Shadows — 2:07
13. Dark Realms — 2:30
14. Beyond The Forbidden Gate — 3:07
15. In The Blood — 3:05
16. The Beast Within — 3:03
17. The Black Crypt — 1:55
18. Wake The Dead — 2:46
19. The Others — 2:54
20. Rise Of The Ancestors — 3:14
21. Dark Surrender — 5:36
- The song "Dark Surrender" ends at 3:15. An untitled hidden track begins at 3:35.
