= Blood of the Dragon (album) =

Studio album by Nox Arcana
- Released: November 27, 2006
- Genres: Dungeon synth, Neoclassical dark wave, New-age, Gothic, Celtic rock
- Label: Monolith Graphics

Nox Arcana chronology
| Blood of Angels (2006) | Blood of the Dragon (2006) | Shadow of the Raven (2007) |

Professional ratings
Review scores
| Source | Rating |
|---|---|
| Paizo Games | 5/5 stars |
| Prognaut | 5/5 stars |
| Side-line | 5/5 stars |
| Metal Sound | 8.5/10 stars |

Blood of the Dragon is the seventh album by Nox Arcana, incorporating an interactive puzzle. The music is mainly instrumental, with a classical, symphonic, and at times tribal Celtic sound. The music is interspersed with brief narrations and sound effects that relate a tale of high fantasy.

The overall theme is laden with elements popularized in sword and sorcery stories and games, such as wizards, warriors, dragons, elves, witches, dwarves, and trolls. These and other dark fantasy archetypes are represented visually in the artwork that accompanies the disc, and are also strongly suggested by the musical compositions.

The instrumentation includes heavy-sounding drums, gong, bagpipe, harp, acoustic guitar and fiddle, and features appropriate sound effects such as war horns, deeply reverberating chants, swords clashing, chainmail clanking and the war cries and stamping feet of what sounds like thousands of men heading into battle. The album begins and ends with some brief narration in the manner of furthering the story.

Nox Arcana took their concepts of musical storytelling even further with Blood of the Dragon by incorporating an actual quest into their music and CD packaging. The booklet features artwork and puzzle designs by Joseph Vargo. The songs provide hints to set the listener/player upon their quest.

The consensus from reviewers and fans of the Dungeons & Dragons games is that Blood of the Dragon is "one of the best Dungeons & Dragons style soundtracks" and exceeds the listener's expectations. The music has been recommended as an alternative or complementary soundtrack for movies like Conan The Barbarian, The 13th Warrior, and The Lord of the Rings.

== Track listing ==
Music composed and performed by Joseph Vargo and William Piotrowski.

1. "Ancient Legacy" — 1:34
2. "The Quest Begins — 3:29
3. "Citadel of Secrets" — 3:05
4. "Sorcerer" — 2:38
5. "Treasure of the Four Crowns" — 3:11
6. "Highland Storm" — 3:52
7. "Mist Loch" — 2:57
8. "Underworld" — 3:31
9. "The Mystic’s Keep" — 4:01
10. "Stygian Depths" — 1:15
11. "Legions of Darkness" — 2:46
12. "Steeds of Thunder" — 3:28
13. "Rogue’s Hollow" — 1:15
14. "Warrior’s Dawn" — 4:13
15. "The Siege" — 3:51
16. "Dragon Riders" — 3:08
17. "Flame Tongue" — :57
18. "Defenders of the Realm" — 4:28
19. "Chamber of the Immortals" — 1:39
20. "Blood of the Dragon" — 3:11
21. "Eternal Champions" — 7:33
- The song "Eternal Champions" ends at 4:20, but there are two untitled hidden tracks: The first hidden track starts at 4:45 and ends at 5:40; the second hidden track starts at 5:55 and ends at 7:33.
