= Nox Arcana =

American neoclassical dark wave musical project

- Origin: Cleveland, Ohio, U.S.
- Genres: Gothic; neoclassical dark wave; dark ambient; dark cabaret; dungeon synth; ethereal wave; classical crossover; Halloween music; Christmas music; rock music
- Years active: 2003–present
- Label: Monolith Graphics
- Members: Joseph Vargo
- Past members: William Piotrowski
- Website: noxarcana.com

Nox Arcana is an American neoclassical dark wave musical project founded in 2003 by Joseph Vargo. Initially Nox Arcana was formed as a duo with William Piotrowski, who left in 2008 to pursue a career in film score composing but still acts as its studio engineer. Vargo has since continued on as the sole composer and musician performing as Nox Arcana. The name is derived from two Latin words that roughly translate to "mysteries of the night."

All of Nox Arcana's music is released independently on the Monolith Graphics label, a publishing company owned by Vargo. With their third album Winter's Knight, Nox Arcana became a Billboard charting artist.

Nox Arcana's music is often used to provide atmosphere for films, plays and ballet performances, role-playing games and during Halloween at theme parks, several of which have based haunted attractions on Nox Arcana's original theme albums.

Nox Arcana releases on average two to three albums per year, each with 21 tracks, with a few exceptions. Joseph Vargo and William Piotrowski co-wrote the music for the albums Darklore Manor, Necronomicon, Winter's Knight, Transylvania, Carnival of Lost Souls, Blood of Angels (with Michelle Belanger), Blood of the Dragon, Shadow of the Raven, Grimm Tales, and Phantoms of the High Seas.

Since 2009, Joseph Vargo performed as Nox Arcana in a solo capacity, and released the albums Blackthorn Asylum, followed by Winter's Eve, Theater of Illusion, The Dark Tower, an album based on his book series,, and Winter's Majesty.

In 2013, Legion of Shadows was released as a dedication to fans, marking Nox Arcana's 10-year anniversary. Simultaneously, William Piotrowski released his first solo album Crimson Winter (Original Motion Picture Soundtrack), a score for the vampire film Crimson Winter.

For the next decade Joseph Vargo performed as Nox Arcana on Gothic, The Haunted Symphony, Season of the Witch, and Ebonshire, a collection of songs from 5 earlier volumes in a series of winter holiday EPs inspired by Nox Arcana's holiday music trilogy: Winter's Knight (2005), Winter's Eve (2009), and Winter's Majesty (2012), which are each set in a fantasy realm called "Ebonshire". The five volumes culminated in 2018 with the Ebonshire CD release, which included four new tracks.

During 2025, Nox Arcana released three full-length albums, an EP, and several singles: Pandora's Box, a theme based on the ancient Greek myth of Pandora; Darkfall, Vol. 4, a follow-up to the earlier Billboard charting releases in the Darkfall music series; Doctor Arcana Official Gaming Soundtrack, a collection of all the songs from both game soundtracks onto one CD; and delved into the rock genre with Hard Nox, which features vocals on the majority of tracks, several performed by Joseph Vargo, along with electric guitars and bass drums. In December, three more songs were released for the winter holidays season, a tradition begun in 2019 and continuing each year thereafter.

== Concept ==
Nox Arcana specializes in concept albums based on original stories, as well as gothic fiction and classic horror literature Some of their albums also make reference to medieval themes and ancient mythology.

In addition to the storytelling aspect of each album, hidden puzzles and interactive quests are incorporated into the album artwork and into the music itself. Beginning with the Blood of the Dragon CD in 2006, Vargo began a tradition of incorporating a quest or adventure within the album artwork and sometimes leaving clues in his narratives. He later went back and did the same for some of the earlier CDs. Now more than half of Nox Arcana's CDs contain some sort of hidden puzzle, which is left to the listener to discover.

In an interview for Ideology of Madness Joseph Vargo is asked why all Nox Arcana albums contain 21 tracks. He jokingly replies, "We are contractually bound to put 21 tracks on all of our CDs. It's part of our pact with the Devil..." then continues to explain a more mundane reason, "Seriously though... It enables us to divide the album into three parts, each with seven songs to convey the introduction, middle and finale... Also, since our tracks aren't that long, it allows us to put over an hour of music on each CD. We just started doing it with our first album and we never broke tradition."

== Video games & game soundtracks ==
In 2018, Joseph Vargo's lifelong love of puzzles was the impetus for creating the adventure-puzzle video game and soundtrack The Cabinets of Doctor Arcana. Based on the magic theme he initially explored with Theater of Illusion, the challenge of the game was to resolve a maze of riddles and perplexing puzzles in order to avoid spending eternity locked inside an inescapable mansion. Both game and soundtrack were received with very positive reviews.

A sequel to the video game accompanied by a new soundtrack entitled Doctor Arcana and The Secret of Shadowspire was released in 2024.

== Musical style ==
Nox Arcana's music is melodic and moody, focusing on a dominant melody line. Instrumentation varies with each album as appropriate to the theme or time period of the album concept, and typically includes piano, bells, violin, pipe organ, harpsichord, timpani drums and other percussion. Some albums also include cymbals, lutes, acoustic guitars, bagpipes and glockenspiel, depending on the theme of a given album.

Their music is generally classified as dark neoclassical or dark ambient, sometimes sandwiched into the gothic music genre and aptly labeled "atmospheric gothic." The moods associated with Nox Arcana music describe it as ominous, romantic, lush, epic, otherworldly, menacing, spooky and eerie, Nox Arcana's music covers a broad range of subgenres within the rock and alternative music categories.

Joseph Vargo explains Nox Arcana's style to a writer for Gnostic.com, "Our music is mainly classically based instrumental, although we do incorporate chanting choirs and spoken narratives for dramatic effect to achieve a blend of darkly haunting melodies that encompass the complete gothic spectrum the romantic, the mysterious, and the horrific. We utilize a variety of instruments such as piano, pipe organ, violin, acoustic guitar, drums and tolling bells to achieve symphonic orchestrations. Our concept has always been to create moody and melody-driven gothic soundscapes that take the listener on a musical journey through various dark realms of fantasy."

Carnival of Lost Souls though primarily a dark cabaret-style album, also contains a heavy metal song, while the music on the Blood of Angels album blends industrial dance and tribal rhythms with ethereal-style vocals. In an interview with Metal Sound Magazine, when asked to define Nox Arcana's genre, Vargo said, "Because we have a variety of styles, it's difficult to classify the entire spectrum of our sound with one label. I think it falls between several genres, but if I had a gun to my head, I would classify it as Gothic instrumental, or dark neoclassical. Most of our music is very melody-driven, unlike most ambient music, and some of our music has a heavy edge with powerful orchestrations. We also use sound effects and narratives to help us relay our theme, in addition to having occasional guest vocalists and rock musicians."

Vocals and narratives are also used sparingly to help relate a story or serve as introduction to a musical piece, for example, the voice of "Jonathan Harker" and whispered female voices of "Dracula's brides" that beckon to the listener, with a variety of low Gregorian-style chanting and choirs on Transylvania; the use of calliope music and a carnival barker with the indistinct sounds of a circus audience in the distance on Carnival of Lost Souls,, the gravelly voice of a "witch" casting a spell on Grimm Tales; low tribal chants and heavy pounding drums on Blood of the Dragon. Enforcing the theme and the narrative are the use of sound effects, such as a door creaking, a pendulum swinging, and the muffled voice of a man calling out from the grave after being prematurely buried on the Poe-inspired Shadow of the Raven; and the creaking of a wooden ship and the splashing of waves among traditional pirate-inspired songs on Phantoms of the High Seas.

Nox Arcana's trilogy of winter holiday-themed albums features a range of ethereal-style choirs, Gregorian-style chanting, classical music, and Celtic new-age instrumentation giving a darker overtone to music for the Christmas and Yuletide holidays.

== Billboard charts ==
Nox Arcana's Christmas album Winter's Knight peaked at No. 8 on the Billboard Top Holiday Albums chart in 2006 and again in 2007.

In 2022, Nox Arcana's Halloween-themed EP Darkfall debuted at No. 13 on Billboard's Classical Crossover chart. It was followed in 2023 with Darkfall, Volume 2 which also debuted on the Classical Crossover chart at No. 9.

== Influences ==
Nox Arcana is influenced by new-age, classical, ambient music, rock music, and film soundtracks, citing other composers such as John Carpenter, Danny Elfman, AC/DC, Wojciech Kilar, Enya, Loreena McKennitt, Beethoven, Jerry Goldsmith, and Hans Zimmer. Their literary references include H. P. Lovecraft, Bram Stoker, The Brothers Grimm, Ray Bradbury, and Edgar Allan Poe.

== Stage and screen ==
Nox Arcana support a wide variety of independent productions like radio dramas and student films to which they lend their music. A number of professional performances of gothic plays, such as Frankenstein, The Legend of Sleepy Hollow, Alice's Adventures in Wonderland, Dracula and Richard III have featured music by Nox Arcana.

In 2005, William Piotrowski wrote the score for a local production entitled Ghosts of Ohio, a video documentary about Mary Ann Winkowski, a real-life medium who inspired the CBS television show Ghost Whisperer.

Nox Arcana's music is used by theme parks such as Busch Gardens, Six Flags, Knott's Scary Farm, Kennywood Park and Universal Studios during Halloween and have designed haunted attractions based upon Nox Arcana's album themes, including Darklore Manor, Transylvania, Carnival of Lost Souls, Grimm Tales, and Blackthorn Asylum.

Nox Arcana's music is featured exclusively on the TV show America Haunts for the Travel Channel, which has aired throughout the Halloween weekend each year since 2009. Music from Nox Arcana's Transylvania album was featured on the FOX TV show So You Think You Can Dance.

In 2013, a young Corsican filmmaker Ariakina Ettori won first place in the L'Institut Régional du Cinéma et de l'Audiovisuel (IRCA) with her modern version of "Little Red Riding Hood" inspired by Nox Arcana's song "Night of the Wolf." The film school credits Joseph Vargo and Nox Arcana for their unconditional support.

In 2016, Nox Arcana's musical composition "Night of the Wolf" from their Transylvania album was the centerpiece of a live performance for Cirque des Voix, a show that combines orchestral and choral music with contemporary circus acts.

== Work with other music acts ==
Three albums, Blood of Angels, Zombie Influx, and House of Nightmares were recorded as side-projects with other artists or vocalists.

Nox Arcana's sound has been used by other performing artists to introduce their albums or live shows. Joseph Vargo recorded the vocal Intro for the 2008 album Witchtanic Hellucinations by Acid Witch. He also provided the intro music and vocals for Legion of the Damned albums Cult of the Dead (2008) and Decent Into Chaos (2011). LOTD also opened their 2010 "Slaughtering" tour with Nox Arcana's song "Circus Diabolique" from their album Carnival of Lost Souls. In 2013, Blood on the Dance Floor opened their Bad Blood tour with "Essence of Evil" from Nox Arcana's Blackthorn Asylum album.

== Monolith Graphics and related works ==
Monolith Graphics publishes and distributes Nox Arcana music worldwide. The publishing company is owned by Joseph Vargo, who became world-renowned as a gothic-fantasy artist in the early 1990s with work ranging from album covers and books to posters and other products. Before forming Nox Arcana in 2003, Joseph Vargo produced two albums for Midnight Syndicate but left the band in 2000 to co-write Tales from the Dark Tower, a book that follows the exploits of a vampire during the First Crusade. Over the next 8 years, he published Dark Realms magazine, released a best-selling card deck, The Gothic Tarot, and wrote a book based on his original story for Nox Arcana's debut album, Darklore Manor. In 2011, Vargo released, Beyond the Dark Tower, a sequel to Tales from the Dark Tower along with The Dark Tower album based on his book series.

Joseph Vargo's cover art for Nox Arcana's Transylvania album was featured as a full page in LIFE magazine's October 2021 issue, Vampires: Their Undying Appeal.

== Discography ==
Year	Albums released by Monolith Graphics	Release date	Billboard peak (US)
2003	Darklore Manor	December 15, 2003	
2004	Necronomicon	October 10, 2004	
2005	Winter's Knight	July 10, 2005	8
2005	Transylvania	October 21, 2005	
2006	Carnival of Lost Souls	June 6, 2006	
2006	Blood of Angels (with Michelle Belanger)	October 13, 2006	
2006	Blood of the Dragon	November 27, 2006	
2007	Shadow of the Raven	July 20, 2007	
2008	Grimm Tales	April 30, 2008	
2008	Phantoms of the High Seas	October 13, 2008	
2009	Blackthorn Asylum	June 21, 2009	
2009	Zombie Influx (with Jeff Hartz of Buzz-Works)	September 15, 2009	
2009	Winter's Eve	November 27, 2009	
2010	Theater of Illusion	July 15, 2010	
2010	House of Nightmares (with Jeff Hartz of Buzz-Works)	October 1, 2010	
2011	The Dark Tower	September 30, 2011	
2012	Winter's Majesty	December 12, 2012	
2013	Legion of Shadows	October 31, 2013	
2013	Crimson Winter: Original Motion Picture Soundtrack (solo album by William Piotrowski)	October 31, 2013	
2013	Ebonshire - Volume 1 (EP)	December 7, 2013	
2014	Ebonshire - Volume 2 (EP)	December 1, 2014	
2015	Gothic	October 9, 2015	
2015	Ebonshire - Volume 3 (EP)	December 1, 2015	
2016	Ebonshire - Volume 4 (EP)	December 1, 2016	
2017	Season of the Witch	October 1, 2017	
2017	Ebonshire - Volume 5 (EP)	December 12, 2017	
2018	Ebonshire (Compilation)	December 7, 2018	
2019	The Cabinets of Doctor Arcana	February 14, 2019	
2019	The Haunted Symphony	August 20, 2019	
2019	Snow Globe, Nightshade (Non-album singles)	December 5, 2019	
2020	Evergreen, Hidden Hollow (Non-album singles)	December 5, 2020	
2020	Excelsior	December 21, 2020	
2021	Dark Of Winter, Days Gone By, Sapphire Moon (Non-album singles)	December 5, 2021	
2022	Darkfall (EP)	October 13, 2022	13
2022	Guiding Light, Santa Selena, Winter Vale (Non-album singles)	December 5, 2022	
2023	Darkfall, Volume 2 (EP)	October 13, 2023	9
2024	Doctor Arcana and The Secret of Shadowspire (Game Soundtrack)	October 1, 2024	
2024	Darkfall, Volume 3 (EP)	October 15, 2024	
2024	Dawn of Winter, Snow and Stardust, The Path Less Taken (Non-album singles)	December 6, 2024	
2025	Doctor Arcana Official Gaming Soundtrack	February 20, 2025	
2025	Pandora's Box	June 13, 2025	
2025	Darkfall, Volume 4 (EP)	October 3, 2025	
2025	Hard Nox	October 24, 2025	
2025	Whitewood Crossing, Morrigan's Night, Ravensong (Non-album singles)	December 6, 2025	
2026	Darkfall, Volume 5 (EP)	October 2, 2026	
