= The Dark Tower (album) =

Studio album by Nox Arcana
- Released: September 30, 2011
- Genre: Gothic, Dark ambient, Neoclassical
- Label: Monolith Graphics
- Producer: Joseph Vargo

Nox Arcana chronology
House of Nightmares (2010)	The Dark Tower (2011)	Winter's Majesty (2012)

Professional ratings
Review scores
Source	Rating
Music Street Journal	5/5 stars
Gravediggers Local 16	5/5 stars
Malefick Music	5/5 stars

The Dark Tower is the sixteenth concept album by Nox Arcana, released as the soundtrack for The Dark Tower book series by Joseph Vargo.

Narratives at the beginning and end of the album provide the storyline of an ancient castle inhabited by a vampire and haunted by ghosts and living gargoyles. The story is set during the time of the First Crusade. The music is predominantly instrumental with piano and pipe organ melodies accented by choirs, chanting, tolling bells and sound effects. Like other Halloween-themed albums by Nox Arcana, this one also contains a secret interactive puzzle that relates to the characters from the books.

The Dark Tower CD ranked at No. 1 on the Amazon Halloween music category for 28 weeks.

== Track listing ==
All music composed and performed by Joseph Vargo

1. "Darkness Rising" – 1:47
2. "Born of the Night" – 3:29
3. "Crimson Thirst" – 2:47
4. "Vasaria" – 2:55
5. "Vesper Tolls" – 3:25
6. "Path of Shadows " – 3:49
7. "Banshee" – 1:32
8. "Ghost at the Gate" – 2:45
9. "Nightwatcher" – 1:56
10. "The Dark Tower" – 4:31
11. "Haunted" – 3:01
12. "Vampire's Kiss" – 3:04
13. "Undying Love" – 2:35
14. "Masque of Sorrow" – 3:01
15. "King of Fools" – 3:07
16. "Something Wicked" – 0:44
17. "Sinister Forces" – 3:45
18. "Immortal Fire" – 3:31
19. "Sorrow's End" – 3:19
20. "Dark Desire" – 3:37
21. "Noctem Aeternus" – 7:11
- The song "Noctem Aeternus" ends at 3:30, but there are two untitled hidden tracks: the first hidden track starts at 4:00 and ends at 4:35; the second hidden track starts at 5:05 and ends at 7:11.
