= Janine (Bushido song) =

Single by Bushido

from the album Von der Skyline zum Bordstein zurück
- Released: 9 February 2007
- Genre: German hip hop
- Label: ersguterjunge
- Songwriter: Bushido

Bushido singles chronology
"Vendetta" (2006)	"Janine" (2007)	"Eure Kinder" (2007)

"Janine" is a song by German rapper Bushido and the final single from the album Von der Skyline zum Bordstein zurück. The song contains a sample of "Les Mémoires Blessées" by French band Dark Sanctuary, used without permission. The band sued the rapper for using illegal sampling of eight of their songs, on his album.

A remix produced by Screwaholic was released on the song's single and the best-of complication Das Beste (2007). The remix is also used for the video on Bushido's official YouTube channel.

== Contents ==
In the song itself, Bushido sings about a 14-year-old girl who was raped by her stepfather repeatedly, and eventually became impregnated by him. Forced to not only give birth to the baby in her own mother's basement, but also give it up almost immediately after; Janine, wrought with guilt, ends her own life by jumping from a bridge.

== Music video ==
In the video, however, the plot revolves around an older Janine looking back on when she was raped as a teenager, impregnated and abandoning her infant at the base of a church. Plagued by these painful memories as she goes about her daily routines, Janine drowns herself in alcohol and drugs at a rave-type-setting; but in the end, only becomes so immersed in her shame that she has an emotional breakdown right in the middle of the dance floor. At the end of the video, Janine is seen contemplating suicide on a bridge lingering over a highway, but then she leaves.
