= Blood of Angels =

2006 album by Michelle Belanger and Nox Arcana

Studio album by Michelle Belanger & Nox Arcana
- Released: October 13, 2006
- Genre: Gothic, Dark cabaret, Dark ambient, Neoclassical dark wave
- Label: Monolith Graphics
- Producer: Joseph Vargo

Michelle Belanger & Nox Arcana chronology
Carnival of Lost Souls (2006)	Blood of Angels (2006)	Blood of the Dragon (2007)

Professional ratings
Review scores
Source	Rating
Music Extreme	5/5 stars
Flames Rising	5/5 stars
Side-line	5/5 stars

Blood of Angels is a musical collaboration by Michelle Belanger and Neoclassical dark wave musical duo Nox Arcana. It released over label Monolith Graphics on October 13, 2006. This album is also the sixth release by Nox Arcana and also their second release in 2006.

The album was recorded in just five days, while Nox Arcana were simultaneously working on their seventh album, Blood of the Dragon, which released the following month.

== Music ==
Unlike Nox Arcana's other releases, which are primarily instrumental with minimal narratives, these songs feature both lyrical and musical content on every track. Joseph Vargo and William Piotrowski wrote and performed the music. Michelle Belanger wrote and performed the lyrics, which draw upon ancient Enochian myths to tell a story about mythical Watcher Angels, who "abandoned Heaven for a taste of mortal love." According to the Enochian legend, the Watchers (also called Grigori or "Fallen Angels") are celestial beings who were condemned to the earthly realm after uniting with mortals and sharing with them their mystical secrets. The theme of this album was the topic of the "Blood of Angels" discussion panel at Dragoncon in 2009.

The title track features a chant consisting of several angelic and demonic names from Christian mythology, as well as names from Jewish mythology and The Book of Enoch: Azazel, Sariel, Koshbiel, and Shamsiel, Ananel, Sethiel, Raziel, and Zaquiel.

== Track listing ==
1. "Ligeia's Lament" – 3:32
2. "Children of Heaven" – 5:27
3. "Bitter Ashes" – 3:48
4. "Ella Sheena" – 4:46
5. "Angels Are Weeping" – 6:07
6. "Widow's Walk" – 3:10
7. "Forlorn" – 4:08
8. "Blood of Angels" – 3:49
9. "Children of Heaven (Club Mix)" – 5:43
