= Theater of Illusion =

Studio album by Nox Arcana
- Released: July 15, 2010
- Genres: Gothic, Dark cabaret, Dark ambient, Neoclassical dark wave, New-age
- Label: Monolith Graphics

Nox Arcana chronology
Winter's Eve (2009)	Theater of Illusion (2010)	House of Nightmares (2010)

Professional ratings
Review scores
Source	Rating
Fangoria	5/5 stars
Metal Maven	5/5 stars
Metal Sound	8/10 stars

Theater of Illusion is the fourteenth album by musical duo Nox Arcana's. Its theme is that of an old theater haunted by a masked magician. The album is a popular source of music for professional illusionists. Generally, the music is described as intricate with a dark sense of mystery. A few tracks have female choirs amidst dramatic arrangements, another is described as energetic and powerful with Eastern elements.

== Story ==
The world-famous and mysterious masked magician named Doctor Arcana captured global attention with his astounding illusions and spectacular, death-defying escapes. However, at the peak of his career, the magician vanished without a trace under mysterious circumstances. Several rumors began circulating, concerning his whereabouts and fate, but the truth remains a mystery to the present day.

A Gothic mansion at a secluded country estate once served as Doctor Arcana's home, thus christening it as Arcana Manor. Since the magician's disappearance, there have been reports of strange sounds and shadows from within the sprawling mansion, but no living soul has been able to gain entry to investigate the matter, and Arcana Manor has stood abandoned and undisturbed for more than two decades. Unknown to many, a hidden theater lies within the dark manor. This venue, hidden from the outside world, is where master magicians gather to display their talents every Halloween night.

=== Video game & soundtrack inspiration ===
Being a lifelong fan of magic, Joseph Vargo set out to create something specifically for professional illusionists. Vargo later expanded this storyline with the release of The Cabinets of Doctor Arcana video game and soundtrack in 2018, followed in 2024 by the game sequel and soundtrack Doctor Arcana and The Secret of Shadowspire.

== Track listing ==
1. "Abracadabra" — 1:40
2. "Cobwebs" — 2:40
3. "Nostalgia" — 2:24
4. "Forgotten Dreams" — 4:17
5. "Edge of Darkness" — 3:09
6. "Phantom Theater" — 3:03
7. "Hypnos" — 1:05
8. "The Curtain Rises" — 0:56
9. "The Crimson Hourglass" — 3:03
10. "Sinister Cabaret" — 2:57
11. "Necromancer" — 3:46
12. "The Mask of Arcana" — 3:41
13. "Shadow Play" — 3:54
14. "Voodoo" — 3:52
15. "Mysterium" — 4:01
16. "Swords of Kali" — 3:57
17. "Smoke and Mirrors" — 3:19
18. "The Prestige" — 2:52
19. "Black Fire" — 3:04
20. "Dark Destiny" — 3:16
21. "Lord of Illusions" — 6:51
- The song "Lord of Illusions" ends at 3:45, but there are two untitled hidden tracks: the first hidden track starts at 4:15 and ends at 5:20; the second hidden track starts at 5:30 and ends at 6:51.
