= Dark Sanctuary =

French band

- Origin: Paris, France
- Genre: Neoclassical darkwave
- Years active: 1996–present
- Labels: Ancestral Craft; Projekt; Wounded Love
- Members: Dame Pandora; Arkdae; Marguerite; Hylgaryss; Eliane; Sombre Cÿr
- Past members: Marquise Ermia
- Website: dark-sanctuary.com

Dark Sanctuary is a French neoclassical darkwave band that was formed in Paris in 1996.

== History ==
The band's first official release was a 20-minute single-track music CD, Funeral Cry, released in 1997. At that time, the band consisted of only two members, Arkdae on keyboards and Marquise Ermia on vocals.

In 1998, the band added additional members to their line-up: Hylgaryss (keyboards), Sombre Cÿr (percussion/bass) and Eliane (violins). Together, they recorded their debut album, Royaume Mélancolique. They also held their first concert in September 1998 near Paris.

In November 1999, they signed with Wounded Love Records, and after Marguerite (violins) joined, recorded their 2nd album, De Lumière Et d'Obscurité, which was released in November 2000.

Right after the recording sessions, Marquise Ermia left the band to continue her studies, and a new singer, Dame Pandora, joined.

Their third album, L'Être Las - L'envers Du Miroir was released at the beginning of 2003, a few months after the release of a two-track single.

After few concerts in France, the band returned to Germany to record their fourth album, Les Mémoires Blessées. This album, which was released in early 2004, confirmed Dark Sanctuary's own style while providing a deeper maturity, as well as new musical horizons.

In 2005, their first compilation album Thoughts: 9 Years in the Sanctuary was released.

Subsequently, they released two albums called Exaudi Vocem Meam – Part 1 and Exaudi Vocem Meam – Part 2, in 2005 and 2006, respectively.

As of 2009, they will be on an indefinite hiatus. They finished recording, and released a collaborative effort with Victoria Francés entitled Dark Sanctuary that year.

In 2017, Avantgarde Music released Metal Works, a compilation of Dark Sanctuary’s own reinterpretation of a few tracks in a gothic-doom metal style, recorded here and there during the previous recordings in Germany.

In 2023, a new album is announced. Following the EP "Iterum" released in 2022, this album named "Cernunnos" is the first for 14 years, thus marking the return of the band.

== Victims of illegal copying ==
German rapper Bushido has been charged with copying 16 songs from Dark Sanctuary. The song "Les Mémoires Blessées" was sampled by Bushido on his single "Janine" (2007) off his 6th and top-selling album Von der Skyline zum Bordstein zurück (2006). On that album Bushido sampled eight musical works of Dark Sanctuary without permission, including the songs "Les Larmes du méprisé" (used on "Hast du was bist du was"), and "L'autre Monde" (used on "Sex in the City").

On 23 March 2010, Bushido was convicted by the German courts, and was obliged to stop sales of the particular albums, singles and samples, including Von der Skyline zum Bordstein zurück. In addition to that, he was bound to recall and destroy all unsold copies.

A video was leaked to the internet, by Marzel Becker and Stephan Heller, two German music reviewers. In the video they compared Dark Sanctuary's songs to Bushido's songs.

== Line-up ==
Current members

- Dame Pandora – vocals
- Arkdae – keyboards/guitars
- Hylgaryss – keyboards/guitars
- Sombre Cÿr – bass/percussion
- Alexis – percussion

Former members

- Eliane – violins
- Marguerite – violins
- Marquise Ermia – vocals

== Discography ==
=== Albums ===
- Royaume Mélancolique (1999)
- De Lumière et d'Obscurité (2000)
- L'être las – L'envers du miroir (2003)
- Les Mémoires Blessées (2004)
- Exaudi Vocem Meam – Part 1 (2005)
- Exaudi Vocem Meam – Part 2 (2006)
- Dark Sanctuary (2009)
- Cernunnos (2023)

=== Singles and EPs ===
- Funeral Cry (1998)
- Vie Éphémère (2002)
- La Clameur du Silence (promo) (2004)
- Iterum (2021)

=== Compilations ===
- Thoughts: 9 Years in the Sanctuary (2005)
- Metal Works (2017)
