= Victoria Francés =

Spanish illustrator

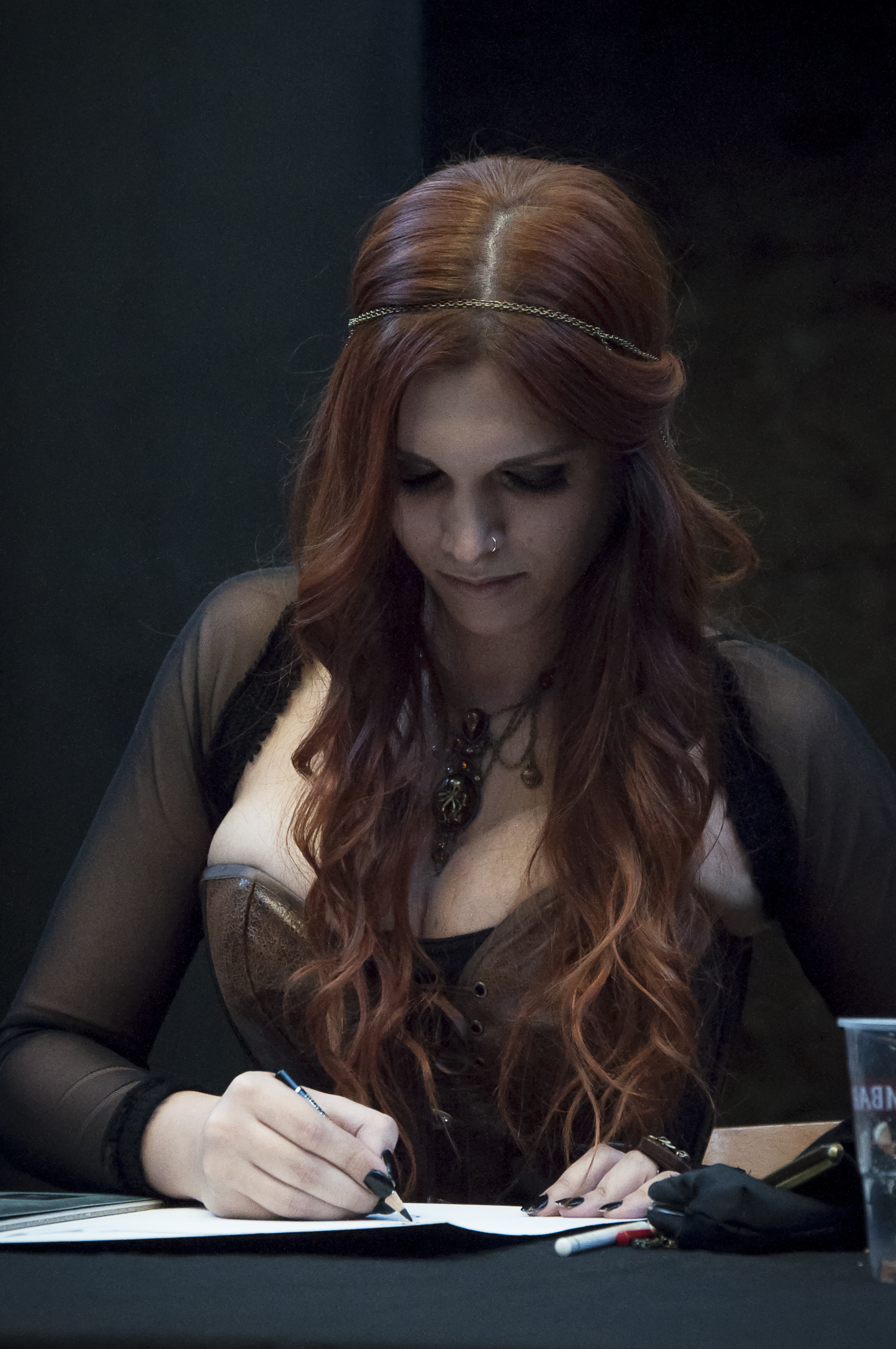
Victoria Francés – Expocómic Madrid 2012

Victoria Francés (born October 25, 1982) is a Spanish illustrator.

== Life ==
Victoria Francés was born in Valencia, Spain on October 25, 1982. She spent part of her childhood in Galicia before returning to her hometown to earn her degree from the San Carlos School of Fine Arts, at the Polytechnic University of Valencia.

The first volume of the Favole trilogy became her first illustrated work to be published. Throughout the Favole trilogy (2004–07) are themes of Dark Romanticism, which are highly influenced by both the Pre-Raphaelite Brotherhood and well-known works of Gothic art. Her work has received a number of awards.

Dark Horse became interested in Francés work, allowing it to be published in North America. She made her first public appearance at the XXII Barcelona Comic Convention. At the convention were calendars featuring her artwork, as well as other promotional merchandise, such as posters, puzzles, and tarot cards. In 2007, the course of her career took another direction with the publication of Arlene's Heart (El Corazón de Arlene) by Planeta DeAgostini.

In 2009, she published the first volume in her Misty Circus series (Norma Editorial) based on the world of the travelling circus, but written for a younger audience. In the same year, Dark Sanctuary was published (Astiberri Ediciones), written in collaboration with Dark Sanctuary, a "Dark Atmospheric" band from France.

The second volume in the Misty Circus series is entitled The Night of the Witches (La Noche de las Brujas), published in 2010.

In 2011, the Favole trilogy was re-edited to create one single volume entitled Integral Favole (Norma Editorial), a compilation of the three books in addition to unpublished sketches and illustrations. In 2012, Ocean's Lament (El Lamento del Océano) was published, in which the author features a listless, spectral mermaid as the main protagonist.

Francés makes images for her merchandise, undertaking commissioned work and collaborating with other artists on works, including the illustration "Hekate" for the album "Luna" for the German Pagan Folk band, Faun, and the artwork for a project entitled "Naked Harp," which was made by the Pagan Folk band, Omnia.

At the end of 2014, Francés presented a new project named MandrakMoors in collaboration with the South Korean bjd doll company, FairyLand. For this project, the author decided to combine both the work of new character design, specifically of characters related to the world of witchcraft and pagan traditions, with the subsequent creation of bjd dolls, in partnership with FairyLand.

== Style ==
Francés and her style are inspired by the Gothic movement, and her work contains characters such as ghostly women wearing long dresses with vampirical attributes. Her illustrations tend to depict solitary characters, young women, or couples in a romantic or melancholic atmosphere. She is influenced by a number of writers, including Edgar Allan Poe, Anne Rice, Goethe, Baudelaire, Bram Stoker, as well as illustrators such as Brian Froud, Arthur Rackham, Edmund Dulac or Luis Royo and bands like Dark Sanctuary, whom she worked with in 2009.

== Bibliography ==
Favole Trilogy:

- (ISBN 84-8431-985-7) Stone Tears (2004) Norma Editorial
- (ISBN 84-9814-127-3) Set Me Free (2005) Norma Editorial
- (ISBN 84-9814-621-6) Frozen Light (2006) Norma Editorial
- (ISBN 84-9814-307-1) Angel Wings (2005) Norma Editorial
- (ISBN 978-84-679-0620-2) Integral Favole (2011) Norma Editorial

Other Published Work:

- (ISBN 84-674-4267-0) Arlene's Heart (2007) Planeta DeAgostini
- (ISBN 978-84-9847-941-6) Misty Circus 1. Sasha, the Little Pierrot (2009) Norma Editorial
- (ISBN 978-84-92769-25-4) Dark Sanctuary Book + CD Dark Sanctuary (2009) Astiberri Ediciones
- (ISBN 978-84-679-0188-7) Misty Circus 2. The Night of the Witches (2010) Norma Editorial
- (ISBN 978-84-679-1058-2) Ocean Lament (2012) Norma Editorial
