= Michelle Belanger =

American author and singer (born 1973)

- Born: January 11, 1973 (age 53); Ravenna, Ohio, United States
- Writing career
- Genres: Dark fantasy, supernatural fiction, gothic fiction, spirituality, Sexuality
- Subjects: Occult, paranormal, vampires
- Notable works: The Dictionary of Demons, The Psychic Vampire Codex, Psychic Energy Codex
- Website: michellebelanger.com

Michelle Belanger is an American author who has authored over two dozen nonfiction books on paranormal and occult topics, has appeared in television documentaries about magic and modern occultism. She has performed as a vocalist and worked as a writer with Nox Arcana.

== Biography ==
Belanger is the founder of the magical group House Kheperu. Belanger has appeared as a psychic on A&E's Paranormal State and Osbourne Media's Portals to Hell. She has consulted for numerous documentaries, books, and courses. Belanger was a National Merit Scholar. Belanger has also contributed to Marvel AR, HBO's True Blood, CNN Headline News, CSI and Nox Arcana.

Belanger is intersex and identifies as male but is comfortable with either male, female, or androgynous pronouns.

== Media ==
She also gives talks on the student campus network, and has appeared in a number of television shows and films about vampires in myth, history, and the modern day. Belanger has appeared on the radio show, Coast to Coast AM.

=== Filmography ===
- Night Bites: Women and Their Vampires (TV Movie 28 May 2003)
- The Secret Life of Vampires (A&E, 2005)
- Vampire Secrets (History Channel, 2006)
- Vampyres (Documentary, 30 August 2007 (Canada))
- Hannity's America: "Night Neighbors" (Fox News, 2011)
- Paranormal State (A&E)
- True Blood-Lines: A New Type (TV Short documentary, 2008)
- MonsterQuest: Vampires in America (Episode aired 6 August 2008; Season 2, Episode 11)
- Paranormal Lockdown: Monroe House (TLC, 2016)
- Jack Osbourne and Katrina Weidman's Portals to Hell (Travel Channel, 2019, 2020, 2021)

=== Music ===
Belanger has performed with Nox Arcana. She was a guest vocalist on Nox Arcana's album Winter's Knight (2005) which ranked #8 on the Billboard chart for Top Holiday Albums. Belanger also wrote the songs for the Nox Arcana's album, Blood of Angels (2006).

=== Literature ===
Michelle Belanger has authored over two dozen books on the occult and paranormal experiences. Some of Belanger's written work include:

== Bibliography ==
=== Nonfiction ===
- The Psychic Vampire Codex (July 2004, Weiser Books, ISBN 1578633214)
- Sacred Hunger (October 2005, Dark Moon Press, ISBN 1411654218)
- Soul Songs from Distant Shores (October 2005, Emerald Tablet Designs, ISBN 1411653076)
- Psychic Dreamwalking (October 2006, Weiser Books, ISBN 1578633869)
- The Psychic Energy Codex (July 2007, Weiser Books, ISBN 9781578633852)
- Vampires in Their Own Words: An Anthology of Vampire Voices (September 2007, Llewellyn Publications, ISBN 978-0738712208)
- The Vampire Ritual Book (October 2007, self published, ISBN 9781442118089)
- This Ritual of Me (December 2007, Emerald Tablet Productions)
- Walking the Twilight Path (October 2008, Llewellyn Publications, ISBN 9780738713236)
- The Ghost Hunter's Survival Guide (October 2009, Llewellyn Publications, ISBN 9780738718705)
- Haunting Experiences (April 2009, Llewellyn Publications)
- Chasing Infinity (July 2010, Emerald Tablet Press, ISBN 9781453722336)
- The Dictionary of Demons: Names of the Damned (October 2010, Llewellyn Publications, ISBN 9780738723068)
- D is for Demon (December 2010, self published, ISBN 978-1456447922)
- House Kheperu Archives: The Outer Teachings of House Kheperu (February 2011, Emerald Tablet Press, ISBN 9781456475307)
- The Watcher Angel Tarot Guidebook (October 2011, Emerald Tablet Press, ISBN 9780983816911)
- Sumerian Exorcism: Magick, Demons, and the Lost Art of Marduk (February 2013, Dark Moon Press, ISBN 9781482521733)
- The Ghost Hunter's Guide to the Occult (July 2013, Dark Moon Press, ISBN 9781490567495)
- Summoning Spirits: The Heptameron of Peter de Abano (February 2016, Dark Moon Press, ISBN 9781523944804)
- Wide World of Weird (December 2019, Inspiration Press, ISBN 9781653925544)
- A Winding Path of Words (January 2020, Emerald Tablet Press, ISBN 9781658166294)

=== Fiction ===
- Wicked Kisses (2008, self published, ISBN 9781453725368)
- This Heart of Flame (November 2009, StoneGarden.net, ISBN 9781600761515)
- When Millie Comes Back (February 2015, Emerald Tablet Productions, ISBN 978-1507655481)
- These Haunted Dreams (collection) (March 2015, Dark Moon Press, ISBN 9781508797920)
- One For The Ferryman (February 2016, Dark Moon Press, ISBN 9781523829446)
- Fairy Tales for the Disenchanted (January 2020, e-book only)

==== The Shadowside ====
1. Conspiracy of Angels (October 2015, Titan Books, ISBN 9781783297337)
2. Harsh Gods (August 2016, Titan Books, ISBN 9781783299546)
3. The Resurrection Game (November 2017, Titan Books, ISBN 9781783299560)

In addition to the main series novels, the following novella was released in ebook only:

- Mortal Sins (October 2016, Titan Books)
