= Carnival of Lost Souls =

Studio album by Nox Arcana
- Released: June 6, 2006
- Genres: Gothic, Dark cabaret, Dark ambient, Dark wave
- Label: Monolith Graphics

Nox Arcana chronology
Transylvania (2005)	Carnival of Lost Souls (2006)	Blood of Angels (2006)

Professional ratings
Review scores
Source	Rating
Arising Realm	10/10 stars
Fangoria	5/5 stars
Metal Sound	7/10 stars
Morbid Outlook	5/5 stars

Carnival of Lost Souls is the fifth album by Dark ambient musical duo Nox Arcana, loosely based on the novel Something Wicked This Way Comes by Ray Bradbury. On this album, Nox Arcana performs a style of music that is indicative of a late 19th-early 20th century circus or Vaudeville act, albeit with a darker, more sinister tone and effect.

In 2017, Carnival Of Lost Souls was ranked by Pretty Famous on MSN at #101 for Best Album of All Time. Nox Arcana made the list with other influential musical artists including The Beatles, Led Zeppelin, The Rolling Stones, and The Ramones.

== Music ==
Their "Calliope" song, for example, is a pipe organ melody that is performed more like a dirge than something festive, and the song "Madame Endora" is a narrative piece featuring the gravely voice of a fortune-teller who warns the listener that "a storm is coming" and to "beware." Other tracks are accented with sound effects of things that one might hear in the encampment of a traveling circus: the tormented, bitter screams of the freaks in the sideshow, the sound of the ringmaster or carnival barker, the cracking of a whip, the distant roaring of animals and rattling of chains. The track "Snake Charmer" combines an exotic drumbeat with wind pipes and finger cymbals, along with the sound of a rattlesnake.

The song "Spellbound" is the only song on the album with full lyrics and male vocals. It was recorded twice on the CD; once as a scratchy-crackly-sounding record, like something played on an old Victrola machine, then as a goth/metal version on a hidden track at the end of the CD.

Nox Arcana hosted a CD release party that coincided with the album release date of 6-6-06 and played up the superstitions surrounding that date with a horror-carnival atmosphere. The rock version of "Spellbound" was performed live.

Carnival of Lost Souls is one of three albums Nox Arcana recorded during a one-year span. Prior to this they released two full-length albums each year.

Music from Carnival of Lost Souls is regularly featured at the Knott's Scary Farm haunted attraction, "Carnevil".

== Track listing ==
1. "Ghosts of the Midway" – 1:48
2. "After Hours" – 2:16
3. "Harlequin’s Lament" – 3:39
4. "Calliope" – 2:46
5. "Madame Endora" – 1:03
6. "Nightmare Parade" – 2:38
7. "Shadows Fall" – 2:18
8. "Hall of Mirrors" – 1:32
9. "Spellbound" – 1:04
10. "Cries in the Night" – 1:21
11. "Soul Stealer" – 2:28
12. "Haunted Carousel" – 3:12
13. "Theatre of Sorrows" – 2:35
14. "Living Dolls" – 2:52
15. "Lost in the Darkness" – 4:15
16. "Snake Charmer" – 4:26
17. "Freaks" – 1:24
18. "Circus Diabolique" – 3:24
19. "Pandora’s Music Box" – 3:08
20. "The Devil’s Daggers" – 3:17
21. "Storm" – 11:36
- The song "Storm" ends at 2:40, but there are three untitled hidden tracks: the first hidden track starts at 3:20 and ends at 4:25; the second hidden track starts at 4:55 and ends at 5:50; the third hidden track starts at 6:05 and ends at 11:36. This third hidden track is a heavy metal version of the song "Spellbound". Lyrics and music by Joseph Vargo, vocals performed by Jim Hamar, lead guitar performed by Jeff Endemann. In the song, Vargo recites the phrase "By the pricking of my thumb, something wicked this way comes..."
