= Crime Library =

Defunct true crime website

- Website type: Online database, Law enforcement
- Available in: English
- Owner: truTV
- Creator: Marilyn J. Bardsley
- Commercial: Yes
- Launched: 1998; 28 years ago
- Current status: Defunct

Crime Library was a website documenting major crimes, criminals, trials, forensics, and criminal profiling from books. It was founded in 1998 and was most recently owned by truTV, a cable TV network that is part of Time Warner's Turner Broadcasting System. By August 2014, Crime Library was no longer being updated.

== Content ==
Crime Library contains an extensive collection of crime related articles, which were separated into categories: Serial Killers, Notorious Murders, Criminal Mind, Terrorists & Spies and Gangsters & Outlaws. Each category was then broken down into further subcategories. For example, within Serial Killers were the subcategories Most Notorious, Sexual Predators, Truly Weird & Shocking, Unsolved Cases, Partners in Crime and Killers from History. Crime Library also featured photo galleries. These may have had anywhere from 10 to upwards of 100 slides. Some photo galleries were focused on a specific case, while others were lists of crimes linked by a theme (e.g., "Baby for Sale," cases where a person was arrested for allegedly attempting to sell their child), or collections of unusual booking photos.

High-profile crimes in the United States were prominent on Crime Library, but the site also contained information about historically notorious characters from various countries, including United Kingdom, Australia and France.

All articles on Crime Library were written exclusively for Crime Library by dozens of commissioned writers, many of them true-crime authors, including Chuck Hustmyre, Katherine Ramsland, Gary C. King and Anthony Bruno.

Crime Library maintained social media features where readers could interact and discuss criminal cases, including a Facebook page, a Twitter account and message boards.

== History ==
Crime Library was founded by Marilyn J. Bardsley in January 1998. Court TV, later truTV, purchased Crime Library in 2001, the same year The Smoking Gun was acquired by Court TV. Originally "The Crime Library," the name of the site was shortened to Crime Library in 2003 to accompany a redesign that changed the site's color scheme and layout.

Crime Library was managed by editor-in-chief Andy Brooks and managing editors Nastacia Leshchinskaya and Cora Van Olson.

As of August 2014, Crime Library was no longer providing updates on their website. As of 2015, the site is no longer accessible, but its content can be read at the Wayback archive of the site.
