= Winter's Eve =

Studio album by Nox Arcana
- Released: November 27, 2009
- Genres: Christmas music, Celtic new-age, Gothic, New Age, Neoclassical
- Label: Monolith Graphics

Nox Arcana chronology
Zombie Influx (2009)	Winter's Eve (2009)	Theater of Illusion (2010)

Professional ratings
Review scores
Source	Rating
Christmas Reviews	5/5 stars
Gravedigger's Local 16	5/5 stars
Metal Sound	9/10 stars

Winter's Eve is the thirteenth studio album and second Christmas-themed album by Nox Arcana. It was released in 2009 on Monolith Graphics. Apart from traditional music for the Christmas season, the theme of this album evokes a medieval or pagan Yuletide celebration typical of the winter solstice. The album tells the story of a white queen of winter who casts a spell of slumber on a forest, and she watches over those who sleep as their dreams form in the snow.

With William Piotrowski leaving in 2008 to focus on film scoring, this is the first Nox Arcana album released as a solo project under Joseph Vargo; Piotrowski remains credited as an additional instrumentalist and studio engineer on all of the project's future releases.

== Track listing ==
All music composed and performed by Joseph Vargo. "Greensleeves" (traditional) arranged by Joseph Vargo.

1. "The Messenger" — 1:18
2. "Frozen Memories" — 2:45
3. "Magic and Moonlight" — 3:25
4. "The Rose of Winter" — 2:24
5. "Enchanted Realm" — 2:35
6. "The Ides of December" — 4:21
7. "Gifts of the Magi" — 3:01
8. "Season of Wonder" — 2:44
9. "Solstice Dance" — 2:30
10. "The White Queen" — 2:53
11. "Winter's Eve" — 4:19
12. "Starlight Serenade" — 3:31
13. "Greensleeves" — 4:09
14. "The Longest Night" — 4:02
15. "Pax Terra" — 3:01
16. "Winds of Change" — 3:39
17. "Fading Embers" — 2:07
18. "Crystal Chimes" — 2:08
19. "Serenity" — 2:41
20. "Winter Rhapsody" — 3:28
21. "Time Slips Away" — 5:35
- The song "Time Slips Away ends at 4:00. An untitled hidden track starts at 4:25.
