= Winter's Knight =

Studio album by Nox Arcana
- Released: July 10, 2005
- Genre: Christmas music, Neoclassical dark wave, New-age, Dark ambient, Celtic new-age, Gothic
- Label: Monolith Graphics

Nox Arcana chronology
Necronomicon (2004)	Winter's Knight (2005)	Transylvania (2005)

Professional ratings
Review scores
Source	Rating
Christmas Reviews	5/5 stars
Morbid Outlook	5/5 stars
Fangoria	5/5 stars

Winter's Knight is the third album by gothic duo Nox Arcana. The album peaked at #8 on Billboard Magazine's Music Charts for Top Holiday Albums of 2006 and 2007.

The soundtrack is predominantly instrumental with a few traditional holiday songs performed with a darker medieval flair. The music is accented with Gregorian chanting, pipe organs, violins, and acoustic guitar. Some of the tracks contain vocals, such as the minstrel's rendition of "Past Time With Good Company". Other songs feature narration describing a tale of a ghostly knight who wanders the ruins of a haunted cathedral at wintertime. The story is set in the mythical Ebonshire forest. The booklet is decorated to look like an Illuminated manuscript and features the artwork of Joseph Vargo.

Nox Arcana, already popular in the gothic music genre, wanted to carry the gothic mood into the Christmas season, along the lines of Dickens' classic ghost story, A Christmas Carol.

== Track listing ==
1. "Vigil" — 1:41
2. "Ghosts of Christmas Past" — 3:40
3. "Ebonshire" — 2:53
4. "Solitude" — 2:51
5. "Crystal Forest" — 3:17
6. "First Snow" — 4:36
7. "Evening Star" — 3:21
8. "Reflections of Long Ago" — 2:25
9. "December Winds" — 2:49
10. "Phantom Toccata" — 1:12
11. "Hallowed Ruins" — 2:28
12. "Gregorian Hymn" — 1:16
13. "Spirit of the Season" — 3:13
14. "Coventry Carol" — 3:23
15. "Lullaby" — 2:06
16. "Winter's Knight" — 3:53
17. "Past Time With Good Company" — 3:33
18. "God Rest Ye Merry, Gentlemen" — 3:02
19. "Veni, Veni, Emmanuel" — 3:01
20. "Redemption" — 3:44
21. "Carol of the Bells" — 5:20 (includes untitled hidden track at 4:15)
