= Katherine Ramsland =

American writer and academic (born 1953)

- Born: Katherine Johnston; January 2, 1953 (age 73); Ann Arbor, Michigan, U.S.
- Occupations: Crime writer, professor
- Writing career
- Genre: Non-fiction
- Subjects: True crime, supernatural
- Notable works: Confession of a Serial Killer; The Human Predator; The Mind of a Murderer; The Serial Killer's Apprentice

Katherine Ramsland (born January 2, 1953) is an American non-fiction author and professor of forensic psychology. Ramsland writes in the genres of crime, forensic science, and the supernatural. She is also the Assistant Provost as well as a Professor Emerita of Forensic Psychology and Criminal Justice at DeSales University.

== Early life and education ==
Ramsland was born in Ann Arbor, Michigan, and grew up in the neighboring town of Saline. She is the daughter of Barbara and Henry Johnston, and has three siblings. She earned a bachelor's degree in psychology and philosophy from Northern Arizona University in 1978, a master's in clinical psychology from Duquesne University in 1979, a Ph.D. in philosophy from Rutgers University in 1984, a master's degree in forensic psychology from the John Jay College of Criminal Justice in 2000, a master's in criminal justice from DeSales University in 2012, and a Master of Fine Arts from DeSales University in 2021.

Her career has also led her to appear on many investigative television shows as a forensic psychologist, including 20/20, Snapped: Notorious, Surviving a Serial Killer. She has appeared on more than 200 crime documentaries, as well as serving as an executive producer for Murder House Flip, and consultant for CSI, Bones, and The Alienist.

== Career ==
Ramsland has written on the subjects of serial killers, crime scene investigation, vampires, forensic science, mass murder, sex offenders and ghosts, and was a regular contributor to Crime Library.

Ramsland has more recently been recognized as the former instructor of Bryan Kohberger, the convicted mass murderer responsible for the 2022 University of Idaho murders. Ramsland met him in 2018, as he was a psychology major on the forensics track that made her his advisor. She says he was "eager to be in the classroom, polite, respectful, intense, and curious." Ramsland remains curious as to how he was able to trick her, and wishes to understand. Ramsland taught Kohberger in four classes, and stated that "there wasn't anything that 'stood out' to her and she didn't observe any 'red flags'. She acknowledged the risk of the forensic psychology field attracting "somebody who wants to do something terrible", and briefly questioned her teaching methods. Ramsland has also expressed interest in studying Kohberger, remarking, "if he wanted to do that, I would."

Ramsland has also interviewed notable serial killers, such as Dennis Rader, and served as a co-executive producer on a four-part documentary surrounding his crimes.

== Awards ==
- 2023 DeSales University Provost's Faculty Excellence Award
- 2025 Anthony Award for Best Critical/Nonfiction Work: Ramsland, Katherine M.; Ullman, Tracy (2024). The Serial Killer's Apprenctice: The True Story of How Houston's Deadliest Murder Turned a Kid Into a Killing Machine. New York Crime Inc. ISBN 978-1-61316-495-2.

== Bibliography ==
- Dormann, Paige (5 July 2023). "Katherine Ramsland Earns Provost's Faculty Excellence and New Title." DeSales University. https://www.desales.edu/news/2023/07/katherine-ramsland-earns-provosts-faculty-excellence-award-and-new-title
- Hall, Dave; Burkey, Tym; Ramsland, Katherine M. (2008). Into the Devil's Den: How an FBI Informant Got Inside the Aryan Nations and a Special Agent Got Him Out Alive. New York: Ballantine Books. ISBN 978-0-345-49694-2, named New Mexico Book of the Year in 2008.
- Rahman, K. (2025, July 3). Serial killer expert reveals how Bryan Kohberger "completely" fooled her. Newsweek. https://www.newsweek.com/serial-killer-expert-bryan-kohberger-fooled-her-2093526
- Ramsland, Katherine M. (2002). The Criminal Mind: A Writer's Guide to Forensic Psychology. Cincinnati, OH: Writer's Digest. ISBN 978-1-58297-079-0.
- Ramsland, Katherine M. (2005). Inside the Minds of Mass Murderers: Why They Kill. Westport, CT: Praeger Publishers. ISBN 978-0-275-98475-5.
- Ramsland, Katherine M. (2010). The Forensic Psychology of Criminal Minds. New York: Berkley Boulevard. ISBN 978-0-425-23226-2.
- Ramsland, Katherine M.; McGrain, Patrick Norman (2010). Inside the Minds of Sexual Predators. Santa Barbara, Calif.: Praeger. ISBN 978-0-313-37960-4.
- Ramsland, Katherine M. (2011). The Mind of a Murderer: Privileged Access to the Demons That Drive Extreme Violence. Santa Barbara, Calif.: Praeger. ISBN 978-0-313-38672-5.
- Ramsland, Katherine M. (2013). The Devil's Dozen: How Cutting-Edge Forensics Took Down 12 Notorious Serial Killers. New York: Berkley Books. ISBN 978-0-425-27077-6.
- Ramsland, Katherine M. (2013). The Human Predator: A Historical Chronicle of Serial Murder and Forensic Investigation. New York: Berkley Books. ISBN 978-0-425-26553-6.
- Ramsland, Katherine M. (2016). Confession of a Serial Killer: The Untold Story of Dennis Rader, the BTK Killer. Hanover: ForeEdge. ISBN 978-1-61168-841-2.
- Ramsland, Katherine M. (2020). How to Catch a Killer: Hunting and Capturing the World's Most Notorious Serial Killers. New York: Sterling. ISBN 978-1-4549-3937-5.
- Ramsland, Katherine M.; Ullman, Tracy (2024). The Serial Killer's Apprentice: The True Story of How Houston's Deadliest Murderer Turned a Kid Into a Killing Machine. New York: Crime Ink. ISBN 978-1-61316-495-2.
