= Halloween music =

Music associated with the holiday of Halloween

- Toccata and Fugue in D minor, BWV 565 has been described as "the perfect piece of Halloween music"
- Stylistic origins: Blues
- Cultural origins: Halloween
- Typical instruments: Theremin; ondes Martenot; Church Organ; Clavi; Harpsichord; Fiddle; Xylophone; Synthesizer; Waterphone; Apprehension Engine

Halloween music is a music genre defined by themes of horror and popularity in association with the holiday of Halloween.

== Definition ==
Halloween music is vaguely defined and ambiguous, but is most commonly considered to include any song that increases in popularity seasonally around two weeks before Halloween. These songs typically include themes of the supernatural, fright, and folklore, and may be intended to arouse fear in listeners. Halloween music has also been associated with goth music.

== History ==
Halloween music's precursor is blues music, which was nicknamed "the devil's music" by detractors. The genre featured secular, and often sexual, lyrics, as well as themes relating to racial oppression. For these reasons, detractors associated it with unholiness. Blues music is defined in part by the blues scale, which can be used to create dissonant and "spooky" sounds. Blues music influenced Halloween songs such as "I Put a Spell on You".

In the 1950s and 1960s, various doo-wop groups, groups influenced by blues music, began to release novelty Halloween-themed songs. "Monster Mash" is an example of such a novelty doo-wop Halloween song. Despite its Halloween themes, doo-wop Halloween music from this era is largely indistinguishable from non-Halloween themed doo-wop music in terms of musical characteristics.

Following the 1960s, Halloween music began to split into various other genres aside from the blues and doo-wop. Classic and hard rock music also included sinister themes, and as such have been associated with Halloween. Songs such as "Highway to Hell" and "Sympathy for the Devil", which are both often considered to be Halloween music, feature blues notes and blues-inspired chord progressions.

In the 1970s and 1980s, horror films grew in popularity, and horror film scores also began to be associated with the holiday. The soundtracks of The Exorcist, The Shining, and Halloween are all considered Halloween music.

== Musical techniques ==
A royalty-free Halloween song that uses ostinato to create suspense

Halloween music, while diverse, often features certain musical techniques used to unnerve listeners. Techniques used include dissonance between notes and the use of tritones, as well as irregular time signatures. Ostinato is used to create suspense in Halloween music, with a famous example being the repeated notes in the theme song of Jaws. Halloween music often features certain instruments as well, such as the theremin and ondes Martenot, which were both in part popularized by horror film soundtracks.

== Popularity ==
Halloween music in the United States increases in popularity around two weeks before October 31, at which point there is a spike in the amount of Halloween music listened to on services such as Spotify. Halloween music is most popular in the American state of Utah, and the largest demographic of people that listens to Halloween music is white women in their 30s and 40s. The most popular Halloween song in the United States is "Thriller" by Michael Jackson (1983).

== See also ==
- Christmas music
- Horror punk
- Horrorcore
- Thrill the World
