= List of number-one singles and albums in Sweden =

This is a list of number-one singles in Sweden at "Kvällstoppen" (Evening top list) 1962–1975, "Topplistan" (The top list) 1975–1997, "Hitlistan" (The hit list) 1998–2007, "Sverigetopplistan" (The Swedish top list) 2007 and forward.

== Swedish number-one singles and albums ==
=== 1962–1975 ===
(note that Kvällstoppen was a combined singles and album chart, with singles dominating a large portion of the 1960s. The first album to reach number one was Abbey Road by the Beatles in 1969, and the first Swedish-language album was Cornelis sjunger Taube by Cornelis Vreeswijk that same year)

Date	Song / album title	Performer
10 July 1962 (5w)	"I Can't Stop Loving You"	Ray Charles
14 August 1962 (1w)	"Gimme a Little Kiss"	Michael Landon
21 August 1962 (3w)	"Speedy Gonzales"	Pat Boone
11 September 1962 (4w)	"Dear One"	Larry Finnegan
9 October 1962 (1w)	"Twistin' Patricia"	Jerry Williams
16 October 1962 (1w)	"The Loco-Motion"	Little Eva
24 October 1962 (4w)	"Surfin' Safari"	The Beach Boys
20 November 1962 (6w)	"Let's Dance"	Chris Montez
1 January 1963 (1w)	"Bobby's Girl"	Marcie Blane
8 January 1963 (3w)	"Return to Sender"	Elvis Presley
29 January 1963 (4w)	"Stand Up"	Michael Cox
26 February 1963 (4w)	"I Saw Linda Yesterday"	Dickey Lee
26 March 1963 (4w)	"Hey Paula"	Paul & Paula
23 April 1963 (2w)	"Blame It on the Bossa Nova"	Eydie Gormé
7 May 1963 (5w)	"How Do You Do It?"	Gerry and the Pacemakers
11 June 1963 (7w)	"Lucky Lips"	Cliff Richard and the Shadows
30 July 1963 (8w)	"(You're the) Devil in Disguise"	Elvis Presley
24 September 1963 (4w)	"Just Like Eddie"	Heinz
22 October 1963 (3w)	"If I Had a Hammer"	Trini Lopez
12 November 1963 (2w)	"Detroit City"	Bobby Bare
26 November 1963 (2w)	"She Loves You"	The Beatles
10 December 1963 (1w)	"Detroit City"	Trini Lopez
17 December 1963 (4w)	"She Loves You"	The Beatles
21 January 1964 (4w)	"I Want to Hold Your Hand"	The Beatles
18 February 1964 (2w)	"Hippy Hippy Shake"	The Swinging Blue Jeans
3 March 1964 (4w)	"All My Loving"	The Beatles
31 March 1964 (6w)	"Can't Buy Me Love"	The Beatles
12 May 1964 (1w)	"I Love You Because	Jim Reeves
19 May 1964 (2w)	"Suspicion"	Terry Stafford
2 June 1964 (3w)	"My Boy Lollipop"	Millie Small
23 June 1964 (4w)	"Tennessee Waltz"	Alma Cogan
21 July 1964 (1w)	"Long Tall Sally"	The Beatles
28 July 1964 (1w)	"Tennessee Waltz"	Alma Cogan
4 August 1964 (1w)	"Long Tall Sally"	The Beatles
13 August 1964 (4w)	"A Hard Day's Night"	The Beatles
8 September 1964 (4w)	"Do Wah Diddy Diddy"	Manfred Mann
6 October 1964 (1w)	"Have I the Right?"	The Honeycombs
13 October 1964 (4w)	"Oh, Pretty Woman"	Roy Orbison
10 November 1964 (4w)	"I Should Have Known Better"	The Beatles
8 December 1964 (1w)	"Fröken Fräken"	Sven-Ingvars
15 December 1964 (1w)	"I Feel Fine"	The Beatles
22 December 1964 (2w)	"Fröken Fräken"	Sven-Ingvars
5 January 1965 (2w)	"I Feel Fine"	The Beatles
19 January 1965 (2w)	"Tell Me"	The Rolling Stones
2 February 1965 (1w)	"Little Honda"	The Beach Boys
9 February 1965 (3w)	"That's The Way"	The Honeycombs
2 March 1965 (7w)	"Rock And Roll Music"	The Beatles
20 April 1965 (1w)	"The Last Time"	The Rolling Stones
27 April 1965 (3w)	"Ticket to Ride"	The Beatles
18 May 1965 (1w)	"Cadillac"	The Hep Stars
25 May 1965 (4w)	"Farmer John"	The Hep Stars
22 June 1965 (3w)	"Bring It On Home to Me"	The Animals
13 July 1965 (3w)	"The Birds and the Bees"	Alma Cogan
3 August 1965 (2w)	"Bald Headed Woman"	The Hep Stars
17 August 1965 (4w)	"Help!"	The Beatles
14 September 1965 (4w)	"(I Can't Get No) Satisfaction"	The Rolling Stones
12 October 1965 (4w)	"Eve of Destruction"	Barry McGuire
9 November 1965 (6w)	"Yesterday"	The Beatles
21 December 1965 (3w)	"Yesterday Man"	Chris Andrews
11 January 1966 (5w)	"We Can Work It Out" / "Day Tripper"	The Beatles
15 February 1966 (5w)	"Michelle"	The Beatles
22 March 1966 (3w)	"These Boots Are Made for Walkin'"	Nancy Sinatra
12 April 1966 (5w)	"Sunny Girl"	The Hep Stars
17 May 1966 (2w)	"Daydream"	The Lovin' Spoonful
31 May 1966 (4w)	"Wedding"	The Hep Stars
28 June 1966 (3w)	"Paperback Writer"	The Beatles
19 July 1966 (1w)	"Bald Headed Lena"	The Lovin' Spoonful
26 July 1966 (2w)	"Bus Stop"	The Hollies
9 August 1966 (3w)	"In My Dreams"	Tages
30 August 1966 (3w)	"Yellow Submarine" (Note: Although issued as a Double A-side together with "Eleanor Rigby", only "Yellow Submarine" reached number one whereas "Eleanor Rigby" failed to chart completely)	The Beatles
20 September 1966 (3w)	"Just Like a Woman"	Manfred Mann
11 October 1966 (4w)	"Little Man"	Sonny & Cher
8 November 1966 (9w)	"Consolation" / "Don't" (Note: Although issued as only the B-Side, "Don't was noted together with the A-side as having reached number one.)	The Hep Stars
10 January 1967 (1w)	"Alex Is the Man"	Ola & the Janglers
17 January 1967 (1w)	"Consolation" / "Don't" (Note: Both "Consolation" by the Hep Stars and "Miss Mac Baren by Tages were registered as number ones on 17 January 1967)	The Hep Stars
17 January 1967 (2w)	"Miss Mac Baren" (Note: Both "Consolation" by the Hep Stars and "Miss Mac Baren by Tages were registered as number ones on 17 January 1967)	Tages
31 January 1967 (4w)	"I'm a Believer"	The Monkees
28 February 1967 (1w)	"Bucket 'T'"	The Who
7 March 1967 (6w)	"Penny Lane" / "Strawberry Fields Forever"	The Beatles
18 April 1967 (2w)	"A Little Bit Me, a Little Bit You" / "The Girl I Knew Somewhere" (Note: Although issued only as a B-Side, "The Girl I Knew Somewhere" was registered at number one together with the A-side "A Little Bit Me, a Little Bit You")	The Monkees
2 May 1967 (2w)	"Puppet on a String"	Sandie Shaw
16 May 1967 (5w)	"Malaika"	The Hep Stars
20 June 1967 (4w)	"The Lion Sleeps Tonight"	The Hounds
18 July 1967 (2w)	"Maria, min vän"	Larry Finnegan
1 August 1967 (4w)	"All You Need Is Love"	The Beatles
29 August 1967 (5w)	"San Francisco (Be Sure to Wear Flowers in Your Hair)"	Scott McKenzie
1 October 1967 (3w)	"Somebody's Taken Maria Away"	Tom & Mick & Maniacs
24 October 1967 (3w)	"Mot okänt land"	The Hep Stars
14 November 1967 (4w)	"Massachusetts"	The Bee Gees
12 December 1967 (5w)	"Hello, Goodbye"	The Beatles
16 January 1968 (6w)	"Lyckliga gatan"	Anna-Lena Löfgren
27 February 1968 (1w)	"Jag var så kär"	Agnetha Fältskog
5 March 1968 (3w)	"Mighty Quinn"	Manfred Mann
26 March 1968 (1w)	"Cinderella Rockefella"	Esther & Abi Ofarim
2 April 1968 (2w)	"Lady Madonna"	The Beatles
16 April 1968 (2w)	"Det börjar verka kärlek, banne mig"	Claes-Göran Hederström
30 April 1968 (6w)	"Congratulations"	Cliff Richard
11 June 1968 (1w)	"Simon Says"	1910 Fruitgum Company
18 June 1968 (2w)	"Young Girl"	Gary Puckett & The Union Gap
2 July 1968 (8w)	Things"	Nancy Sinatra & Dean Martin
27 August 1968 (3w)	"Happy Birthday Sweet Sixteen"	Flamingokvintetten
17 September 1968 (5w)	"Hey Jude"	The Beatles
22 October 1968 (5w)	"Those Were the Days"	Mary Hopkin
26 November 1968 (1w)	"Romeo och Julia"	Inger-Lise Andersen
3 December 1968 (1w)	"Let's Dance"	Ola & The Janglers
10 December 1968 (6w)	"Arrivederci Frans"	Ann-Louise Hanson
21 January 1969 (4w)	"Ob-La-Di, Ob-La-Da"	The Marmalade
18 February 1969 (2w)	"Gunga gunga"	Lasse Berghagen
4 March 1969 (3w)	"One Way Ticket"	Eleanor Bodel
25 March 1969 (3w)	"Judy, Min Vän"	Tommy Körberg
15 April 1969 (2w)	"Where Do You Go To (My Lovely)?"	Peter Sarstedt
29 April 1969 (1w)	"Du skänker mening åt mitt liv"	Ola Håkansson
6 May 1969 (4w)	"Get Back"	The Beatles & Billy Preston
3 June 1969 (2w)	"Man ska leva för varandra"	Trio me' Bumba
17 June 1969 (3w)	"Bunta ihop dom"	Lars Ekborg
8 July 1969 (7w)	"In the Ghetto"	Elvis Presley
26 August 1969 (3w)	"In the Year 2525"	Zager and Evans
16 September 1969 (3w)	"Je t'aime... moi non plus"	Jane Birkin & Serge Gainsbourg
7 October 1969 (1w)	Abbey Road	The Beatles
14 October 1969 (5w)	"Je t'aime... moi non plus"	Jane Birkin & Serge Gainsbourg
18 November 1969 (2w)	Cornelis sjunger Taube	Cornelis Vreeswijk
2 December 1969 (5w)	"Rosen"	Arne Quick
6 January 1970 (1w)	"Sugar, Sugar"	The Archies
13 January 1970 (3w)	"En man i byrån"	Lill Lindfors
3 February 1970 (1w)	"Venus"	Shocking Blue
10 February 1970 (6w)	"Monia"	Peter Holm
24 March 1970 (2w)	"Uppblåsbara Barbara"	Robert Broberg
7 April 1970 (3w)	Bridge over Troubled Water	Simon & Garfunkel
28 April 1970 (3w)	"Love Grows (Where My Rosemary Goes)"	Edison Lighthouse
19 May 1970 (1w)	Bridge over Troubled Water	Simon & Garfunkel
26 May 1970 (7w)	"Pretty Belinda"	Chris Andrews
14 July 1970 (7w)	"In the Summertime"	Mungo Jerry
1 September 1970 (5w)	"Mitt sommarlov"	Anita Hegerland
6 October 1970 (3w)	Bridge over Troubled Water	Simon & Garfunkel
27 October 1970 (5w)	Led Zeppelin III	Led Zeppelin
1 December 1970 (1w)	Abraxas	Santana
8 December 1970 (8w)	"Cracklin' Rosie"	Neil Diamond
19 January 1971 (3w)	"Candida"	Dawn
9 February 1971 (6w)	"My Sweet Lord"	George Harrison
23 March 1971 (6w)	"Rose Garden"	Lynn Anderson
4 May 1971 (3w)	"Chirpy Chirpy Cheep Cheep"	Middle of the Road
25 May 1971 (1w)	"Un banc, un arbre, une rue"	Séverine
1 June 1971 (2w)	"Goin' Back to Indiana"	The Jackson 5
15 June 1971 (2w)	"Funny Funny"	The Sweet
29 June 1971 (5w)	"Butterfly"	Danyel Gérard
3 August 1971 (7w)	"Indian Reservation (The Lament of the Cherokee Reservation Indian)"	The Raiders
21 September 1971 (3w)	Fireball	Deep Purple
12 October 1971 (5w)	"Anna och Mej"	Lalla Hansson
16 November 1971 (1w)	Santana III	Santana
23 November 1971 (6w)	"Mamy Blue"	Pop-Tops
4 January 1972 (5w)	"Soley Soley"	Middle of the Road
8 February 1972 (3w)	Jesus Christ Superstar	Various Artists
29 February 1972 (8w)	Paul Simon	Paul Simon
25 April 1972 (2w)	"Son of My Father"	Chicory Tip
9 May 1972 (4w)	Himself	Gilbert O'Sullivan
6 June 1972 (4w)	"En sång om frihet"	Sven-Bertil Taube
4 July 1972 (10w)	Undringar	Ted Gärdestad
12 September 1972 (4w)	"Sister Jane"	New World
10 October 1972 (1w)	"Popcorn"	Hot Butter
17 October 1972 (3w)	Himself	Gilbert O'Sullivan
24 October 1972 (1w)	"Hello-a"	Mouth & MacNeal
7 November 1972 (13w)	Back to Front	Gilbert O'Sullivan
6 February 1973 (2w)	"Crocodile Rock"	Elton John
20 February 1973 (4w)	Who Do We Think We Are	Deep Purple
20 March 1973 (6w)	"Ring ring (Bara du slog en signal)"	ABBA
1 May 1973 (5w)	"Power to All Our Friends"	Cliff Richard
5 June 1973 (9w)	There Goes Rhymin' Simon	Paul Simon
7 August 1973 (6w)	Janne Schaffer	Janne Schaffer
18 September 1973 (5w)	Killing Me Softly	Roberta Flack
23 October 1973 (4w)	I'm a Writer, Not a Fighter	Gilbert O'Sullivan
20 November 1973 (1w)	Pin Ups	David Bowie
27 November 1973 (4w)	På väg	Hoola Bandoola Band
25 December 1973 (1w)	Flamingokvintetten 4	Flamingokvintetten
1 January 1974 (3w)	Ringo	Ringo Starr
22 January 1974 (6w)	Flamingokvintetten 4	Flamingokvintetten
5 March 1974 (2w)	Burn	Deep Purple
19 March 1974 (12w)	Waterloo (Album)	ABBA
11 June 1974 (7w)	The Sting	Marvin Hamlisch
30 July 1974 (4w)	Upptåg	Ted Gärdestad
27 August 1974 (20w)	Forever and Ever	Demis Roussos
14 January 1975 (5w)	Flamingokvintetten 5	Flamingokvintetten
11 February 1975 (1w)	"I Can Help"	Billy Swan
18 February 1975 (3w)	On the Level	Status Quo
25 February 1975 (3w)	I Can Help	Billy Swan
18 March 1975 (6w)	"Michelangelo"	Björn Skifs
29 April 1975 (16w)	ABBA	ABBA
19 August 1975 (1w)	Greatest Hits	Cat Stevens

== Swedish number-one singles ==
=== 1975–2006 ===
Date	Song title	Performer
14 November 1975 (10w)	"Paloma Blanca"	George Baker Selection
19 January 1976 (4w)	"I'm on Fire"	5000 Volts
16 February 1976 (6w)	"Moviestar"	Harpo
29 March 1976 (8w)	"Vi åk bättre da för da"	Swedish Alpine Ski Team
25 May 1976 (8w)	"Baretta's Theme"	Sammy Davis, Jr.
10 August 1976 (2w)	"Moviestar"	Harpo
24 August 1976 (14w)	"Dancing Queen"	ABBA
30 November 1976 (12w)	"Daddy Cool"	Boney M.
25 February 1977 (10w)	"Shenandoah"	Jan Lindblad
6 May 1977 (10w)	"Ain't That Just the Way"	Barbi Benton
15 July 1977 (6w)	"Ma Baker"	Boney M.
12 August 1977 (22w)	"Yes Sir, I Can Boogie"	Baccara
13 January 1978 (2w)	"I Remember Elvis Presley"	Danny Mirror
27 January 1978 (4w)	"2-4-6-8 Motorway"	Tom Robinson Band
24 February 1978 (2w)	"Ti amo"	Umberto Tozzi
10 March 1978 (10w)	"It's a Heartache"	Bonnie Tyler
14 July 1978 (10w)	"Rivers of Babylon"	Boney M.
22 September 1978 (2w)	"Skateboard" ("LA Run")	Magnum Bonum
6 October 1978 (2w)	"Summer Night City"	ABBA
20 October 1978 (12w)	"You're the One That I Want"	John Travolta & Olivia Newton-John
12 January 1979 (2w)	"Mary's Boy Child"	Boney M.
26 January 1979 (2w)	"Too Much Heaven"	Bee Gees
9 February 1979 (12w)	"Y.M.C.A."	Village People
4 May 1979 (10w)	"Hallelujah"	Milk and Honey
13 July 1979 (2w)	"Pop Muzik"	M
27 July 1979 (6w)	"Born to Be Alive"	Patrick Hernandez
7 September 1979 (6w)	"Bobby Brown"	Frank Zappa
9 October 1979 (14w)	"Oh! Susie"	Secret Service
25 January 1980 (2w)	"No More Tears (Enough Is Enough)"	Donna Summer & Barbra Streisand
8 February 1980 (2w)	"Video Killed the Radio Star"	The Buggles
22 February 1980 (4w)	"Himmel no. 7 / Flickorna på TV2"	Gyllene Tider
21 March 1980 (2w)	"Another Brick In The Wall Part II"	Pink Floyd
4 April 1980 (3w)	"Brass in Pocket"	The Pretenders
16 May 1980 (2w)	"Just nu!"	Tomas Ledin
30 May 1980 (6w)	"What's Another Year"	Johnny Logan
11 July 1980 (12w)	"One More Reggae for the Road"	Bill Lovelady
3 October 1980 (6w)	"Upside Down"	Diana Ross
14 November 1980 (2w)	"Master Blaster (Jammin')"	Stevie Wonder
28 November 1980 (2w)	"Woman in Love"	Barbra Streisand
12 December 1980 (16w)	"När vi två blir en"	Gyllene Tider
10 April 1981 (4w)	"In The Air Tonight"	Phil Collins
8 May 1981 (6w)	"Köppäbävisan"	Bengt Pegefelt
19 June 1981 (4w)	"Hubba hubba zoot-zoot"	Caramba
14 August 1981 (10w)	"Vill ha dej"	Freestyle
24 October 1981 (2w)	"Japanese Boy"	Aneka
6 November 1981 (2w)	"Två av oss"	X-Models
20 November 1981 (8w)	"Ooa hela natten"	Attack
26 January 1982 (4w)	"Cambodia"	Kim Wilde
23 February 1982 (2w)	"Die Fogel-Song"	Kvack Kvack
9 March 1982 (10w)	"Oh Julie"	Shakin' Stevens
18 May 1982 (8w)	"Ein bißchen Frieden"	Nicole
3 August 1982 (4w)	"I Love Rock 'n' Roll"	Joan Jett & The Blackhearts
31 August 1982 (2w)	"Cat People (Putting Out Fire)"	David Bowie
14 September 1982 (2w)	"Abracadabra"	Steve Miller Band
28 September 1982 (2w)	"Cat People (Putting Out Fire)"	David Bowie
12 October 1982 (2w)	"Abracadabra"	Steve Miller Band
26 October 1982 (8w)	"Puttin' On The Ritz"	Taco
21 December 1982 (2w)	"Heartbreaker"	Dionne Warwick
11 January 1983 (4w)	"Do You Really Want to Hurt Me"	Culture Club
8 February 1983 (4w)	"Our House"	Madness
8 March 1983 (2w)	"Words"	F.R. David
22 March 1983 (2w)	"Young Guns (Go for It)"	Wham!
5 April 1983 (10w)	"Let's Dance"	David Bowie
14 June 1983 (4w)	"The Heat Is On"	Agnetha Fältskog
9 August 1983 (6w)	"Flashdance... What a Feeling"	Irene Cara
20 September 1983 (8w)	"Moonlight Shadow"	Mike Oldfield
15 November 1983 (6w)	"Karma Chameleon"	Culture Club
10 January 1984 (2w)	"Say, Say, Say"	Paul McCartney & Michael Jackson
24 January 1984 (6w)	"My Oh My"	Slade
6 March 1984 (4w)	"Radio Ga Ga"	Queen
3 April 1984 (6w)	"99 Luftballons"	Nena
15 May 1984 (2w)	"Street Dance"	Break Machine
29 May 1984 (6w)	"Big in Japan"	Alphaville
3 August 1984 (2w)	"Self Control"	Laura Branigan
17 August 1984 (2w)	"Wake Me Up Before You Go-Go"	Wham!
31 August 1984 (2w)	"Sounds Like A Melody"	Alphaville
14 September 1984 (10w)	"I Just Called to Say I Love You"	Stevie Wonder
23 November 1984 (4w)	"The Never Ending Story"	Limahl
21 December 1984 (2w)	"Forever Young"	Alphaville
11 January 1985 (2w)	"Do They Know It's Christmas?"	Band Aid
25 January 1985 (10w)	"I Want To Know What Love Is"	Foreigner
5 April 1985 (8w)	"We Are the World"	USA For Africa
31 May 1985 (4w)	"Live Is Life"	Opus
26 August 1985 (4w)	"19"	Paul Hardcastle
9 August 1985 (2w)	"A View to a Kill"	Duran Duran
23 August 1985 (8w)	"(I'll Never Be) Maria Magdalena"	Sandra
18 October 1985 (6w)	"Rock Me Amadeus"	Falco
29 November 1985 (4w)	"Take On Me"	a-ha
8 January 1986 (8w)	"Say You, Say Me"	Lionel Richie
5 March 1986 (6w)	"Brother Louie"	Modern Talking
16 April 1986 (6w)	"Dover-Calais"	Style
28 May 1986 (6w)	"The Final Countdown"	Europe
9 July 1986 (8w)	"Touch Me (I Want Your Body)"	Samantha Fox
27 August 1986 (2w)	"Do Ya Do Ya (Wanna Please Me)"	Samantha Fox
10 September 1986 (2w)	"Glory of Love"	Peter Cetera
24 September 1985 (8w)	"Joey Killer"	Magnus Uggla
19 November 1986 (8w)	"The Way You Are"	Agnetha Fältskog & Ola Håkansson
14 January 1987 (4w)	"One Love to Give"	Stéphanie
11 February 1987 (8w)	"Caravan of Love"	The Housemartins
8 April 1987 (8w)	"You're the Voice"	John Farnham
3 June 1987 (6w)	"I Wanna Dance With Somebody (Who Loves Me)"	Whitney Houston
29 July 1987 (8w)	"It's a Sin"	Pet Shop Boys
30 September 1987 (8w)	"Never Gonna Give You Up"	Rick Astley
25 November 1987 (2w)	"Oh Mama"	Lili & Susie
9 December 1987 (4w)	"Whenever You Need Somebody"	Rick Astley
26 January 1988 (2w)	"Tänd ett ljus"	Triad
20 January 1988 (2w)	"Always on My Mind"	Pet Shop Boys
3 February 1988 (2w)	"Heaven is a Place on Earth"	Belinda Carlisle
17 February 1988 (10w)	"Allt som jag känner"	Tone Norum & Tommy Nilsson
27 April 1988 (4w)	"Maybe We're About To Fall in Love"	Tommy Nilsson
25 May 1988 (6w)	"Only One Woman"	Alien
6 July 1988 (2w)	"Den jeg elsker"	Sanne Salomonsen
10 August 1988 (6w)	"Superstitious"	Europe
21 September 1988 (2w)	"The Only Way Is Up"	Yazz and the Plastic Population
5 October 1988 (6w)	"Hand in Hand"	Koreana
16 November 1988 (6w)	"Sarah"	Mauro Scocco
28 December 1988 (4w)	"Vingar"	Mikael Rickfors
25 January 1989 (2w)	"Bring Me Edelweiss"	Edelweiss
8 February 1989 (2w)	"Buffalo Stance"	Neneh Cherry
22 February 1989 (6w)	"Did I Tell You"	Jerry Williams
5 April 1989 (8w)	"Like A Prayer"	Madonna
31 May 1989 (6w)	"Eternal Flame"	Bangles
26 July 1989 (8w)	"Licence to Kill"	Gladys Knight
20 September 1989 (4w)	"Jag mår illa"	Magnus Uggla
18 October 1989 (10w)	"Lambada"	Kaoma
27 December 1989 (6w)	"Another Day in Paradise"	Phil Collins
7 February 1990 (2w)	"Jimmy Dean"	Troll
21 February 1990 (8w)	"Nothing Compares 2 U"	Sinéad O'Connor
25 April 1990 (4w)	"Vogue"	Madonna
23 May 1990 (4w)	"Black Velvet"	Alannah Myles
20 June 1990 (2w)	"Om"	Niklas Strömstedt
4 July 1990 (6w)	"I Promised Myself"	Nick Kamen
29 August 1990 (6w)	"U Can't Touch This"	MC Hammer
10 October 1990 (6w)	"I've Been Thinking About You"	Londonbeat
21 November 1990 (4w)	"No Coke"	Dr. Alban
19 December 1990 (2w)	"Lassie"	Ainbusk
16 January 1991 (4w)	"Sadeness Part I"	Enigma
13 February 1991 (4w)	"Crazy"	Seal
13 March 1991 (8w)	"Joyride"	Roxette
8 May 1991 (4w)	"Wind of Change"	Scorpions
19 June 1991 (6w)	"Senza una donna"	Zucchero feat. Paul Young
14 August 1991 (12w)	"(Everything I Do) I Do It for You"	Bryan Adams
6 November 1991 (2w)	"Good Vibrations"	Marky Mark and the Funky Bunch
20 November 1991 (10w)	"Black or White"	Michael Jackson
5 February 1992 (4w)	"Justified and Ancient"	The KLF
4 March 1992 (2w)	"You"	Ten Sharp
18 March 1992 (2w)	"Stockholm"	Orup
1 April 1992 (6w)	"To Be with You"	Mr. Big
15 May 1992 (2w)	"Stay"	Shakespears Sister
27 May 1992 (4w)	"It's My Life"	Dr. Alban
24 June 1992 (12w)	"Abba-esque"	Erasure
30 September 1992 (2w)	"This Used to Be My Playground"	Madonna
14 October 1992 (2w)	"Om du var min"	Mauro Scocco
28 October 1992 (4w)	"Just Another Day"	Jon Secada
25 November 1992 (6w)	"House of Love"	East 17
13 January 1993 (6w)	"I Will Always Love You"	Whitney Houston
24 February 1993 (8w)	"No Limit"	2 Unlimited
21 April 1993 (6w)	"Informer"	Snow
2 June 1993 (2w)	"Two Princes"	Spin Doctors
16 June 1993 (2w)	"Somebody Dance with Me"	DJ Bobo
30 June 1993 (4w)	"(I Can't Help) Falling in Love With You"	UB40
11 August 1993 (5w)	"What's Up?"	4 Non Blondes
22 September 1993 (1w)	"Life"	Haddaway
29 September 1993 (5w)	"Living on My Own"	Freddie Mercury
3 November 1993 (5w)	"I'd Do Anything for Love (But I Won't Do That)"	Meat Loaf
8 December 1993 (1w)	"In Command"	Rob'n'Raz
15 December 1993 (1w)	"I'd Do Anything for Love (But I Won't Do That)"	Meat Loaf
22 December 1993 (10w)	"All for Love	Bryan Adams, Rod Stewart & Sting
11 March 1994 (1w)	"Return to Innocence"	Enigma
18 March 1994 (3w)	"Sleeping in My Car"	Roxette
8 April 1994 (8w)	"Without You"	Mariah Carey
3 June 1994 (3w)	"Mmm Mmm Mmm Mmm"	Crash Test Dummies
24 June 1994 (3w)	"Baby, I Love Your Way"	Big Mountain
15 July 1994 (1w)	"I Swear"	All-4-One
22 July 1994 (1w)	"När vi gräver guld i USA"	GES
29 July 1994 (1w)	"I Swear"	All-4-One
5 August 1994 (4w)	"Love Is All Around"	Wet Wet Wet
2 September 1994 (8w)	"Cotton Eye Joe"	Rednex
28 October 1994 (4w)	"This Is The Way"	E-type
25 November 1994 (6w)	"Old Pop in an Oak"	Rednex
6 January 1995 (5w)	"Stay Another Day"	East 17
10 February 1995 (2w)	"Tears Don't Lie"	Mark 'Oh
24 February 1995 (4w)	"Self Esteem"	The Offspring
24 March 1995 (4w)	"Think Twice"	Céline Dion
21 April 1995 (5w)	"Se på mej"	Jan Johansen
26 May 1995 (1w)	"Be My Lover"	La Bouche
2 June 1995 (1w)	"'74–'75"	The Connells
9 June 1995 (4w)	"Se på mej"	Jan Johansen
7 July 1995 (3w)	"Vill du bli min fru"	Drängarna
28 July 1995 (1w)	"Shy Guy"	Diana King
4 August 1995 (7w)	"Det vackraste"	Cecilia Vennersten
22 September 1995 (3w)	"Fiskarna i haven"	Idde Schultz
13 October 1995 (1w)	"Lucky Love"	Ace of Base
20 October 1995 (1w)	"Boombastic"	Shaggy
27 October 1995 (12w)	"Gangsta's Paradise"	Coolio feat. L.V.
26 January 1996 (8w)	"Spaceman"	Babylon Zoo
22 March 1996 (1w)	"One of Us"	Joan Osborne
29 March 1996 (2w)	"California Love"	2Pac feat. Dr. Dre
12 April 1996 (7w)	"Children"	Robert Miles
31 May 1996 (2w)	"Until It Sleeps"	Metallica
14 June 1996 (1w)	"Lemon Tree"	Fool's Garden
21 June 1996 (5w)	"Killing Me Softly"	Fugees
26 July 1996 (5w)	"e.p."	Gyllene Tider
30 August 1996 (3w)	"Wannabe"	Spice Girls
20 September 1996 (5w)	"Coco Jamboo"	Mr. President
25 October 1996 (3w)	"Free Like a Flying Demon"	E-type
15 November 1996 (1w)	"Ain't That Just the Way"	Lutricia McNeal
22 November 1996 (3w)	"Breathe"	The Prodigy
13 December 1996 (1w)	"Don't Speak"	No Doubt
20 December 1996 (1w)	"Un-Break My Heart"	Toni Braxton
27 December 1996 (3w)	"Breathe"	The Prodigy
17 January 1997 (4w)	"Un-Break My Heart"	Toni Braxton
14 February 1997 (1w)	"Barrel of a Gun"	Depeche Mode
21 February 1997 (1w)	"Un-Break My Heart"	Toni Braxton
28 February 1997 (6w)	"Vänner"	Together
11 April 1997 (1w)	"It's No Good"	Depeche Mode
18 April 1997 (1w)	"Do You Wanna Be My Baby?"	Per Gessle
25 April 1997 (6w)	"Bailando"	Paradisio
6 June 1997 (1w)	"MMMBop"	Hanson
13 June 1997 (4w)	"Bailando"	Paradisio
11 July 1997 (8w)	"I'll Be Missing You"	Puff Daddy & Faith Evans feat. 112
18 August 1997 (3w)	"Barbie Girl"	Aqua
26 September 1997 (7w)	"Something About the Way You Look Tonight" / "Candle in the Wind 1997"	Elton John
14 November 1997 (4w)	"Burnin'"	Cue
12 December 1997 (4w)	"I Will Come to You"	Hanson
16 January 1998 (5w)	"Torn"	Natalie Imbruglia
20 February 1998 (1w)	"It's Like That"	Run DMC vs. Jason Nevins
27 February 1998 (11w)	"My Heart Will Go On	Céline Dion
15 May 1998 (1w)	"This Is How We Party"	S.O.A.P.
22 May 1998 (4w)	"Vill ha dig"	Drömhus
19 August 1998 (6w)	"La copa de la vida"	Ricky Martin
31 July 1998 (9w)	"Calcutta (Taxi Taxi Taxi)"	Dr. Bombay
1 October 1998 (7w)	"Big Big World"	Emilia
19 November 1998 (2w)	"Here I Go Again"	E-type
3 December 1998 (5w)	"Believe"	Cher
14 January 1999 (5w)	"Pretty Fly (For a White Guy)"	The Offspring
18 February 1999 (4w)	"Vi drar till fjällen"	Markoolio
18 March 1999 (3w)	"...Baby One More Time"	Britney Spears
8 April 1999 (2w)	"(Du är så) Yeah Yeah Wow Wow"	Martin
22 April 1999 (4w)	"Boom, Boom, Boom, Boom!!"	Vengaboys
20 May 1999 (8w)	"Mamma Mia"	A-Teens
15 July 1999 (7w)	"Mambo No. 5 (A Little Bit of...)"	Lou Bega
2 September 1999 (8w)	"Blue (Da Ba Dee)"	Eiffel 65
28 October 1999 (5w)	"The Bad Touch"	Bloodhound Gang
2 December 1999 (6w)	"Millennium 2"	Markoolio
13 January 2000 (10w)	"Freestyler"	Bomfunk MC's
23 March 2000 (1w)	"American Pie"	Madonna
30 March 2000 (3w)	"Never Be The Same Again"	Melanie C feat. Lisa "Left Eye" Lopes
20 April 2000 (2w)	"Maria Maria"	Santana feat. The Product G&B
4 May 2000 (2w)	"Oops!... I Did It Again"	Britney Spears
18 May 2000 (2w)	"Mera mål!"	Markoolio featuring Arne Hegerfors
1 June 2000 (1w)	"Fly on the Wings of Love"	Olsen Brothers
8 June 2000 (7w)	"Mera mål!"	Markoolio feat. Arne Hegerfors
27 July 2000 (3w)	"Hiphopper"	Thomas Rusiak featuring Teddybears STHLM
17 August 2000 (3w)	"I Turn to You"	Melanie C
7 September 2000 (1w)	"Lucky"	Britney Spears
14 September 2000 (1w)	"Nitar och läder"	Magnus Uggla
21 September 2000 (1w)	"Lucky"	Britney Spears
28 September 2000 (3w)	"Nitar och läder"	Magnus Uggla
19 October 2000 (2w)	"De tio budorden"	Feven
2 November 2000 (1w)	"Shape of My Heart"	Backstreet Boys
9 November 2000 (1w)	"My Love"	Westlife
16 November 2000 (1w)	"She Bangs"	Ricky Martin
23 November 2000 (1w)	"My Love"	Westlife
30 November 2000 (5w)	"911"	Wyclef Jean feat. Mary J. Blige
4 January 2001 (3w)	"Can't Fight the Moonlight"	LeAnn Rimes
25 January 2001 (2w)	"Ms. Jackson"	OutKast
8 February 2001 (7w)	"Romeo"	Shebang
29 March 2001 (4w)	"The Centre of the Heart"	Roxette
26 April 2001 (5w)	"Need To Know (Eenie Meenie Miny Moe)"	Excellence
31 May 2001 (1w)	"Daddy DJ"	Daddy DJ
7 June 2001 (4w)	"Angel"	Shaggy feat. Rayvon
5 July 2001 (1w)	"Daddy DJ"	Daddy DJ
12 July 2001 (3w)	"Lady Marmalade"	Christina Aguilera, Mýa, Lil' Kim, Pink
2 August 2001 (5w)	"There You'll Be"	Faith Hill
7 September 2001 (5w)	"Follow Me"	Uncle Kracker
12 October 2001 (3w)	"Can't Get You Out of My Head"	Kylie Minogue
2 November 2001 (3w)	"Rocka på"	Markoolio vs. The Boppers
23 November 2001 (1w)	"Life"	E-type
30 November 2001 (1w)	"Rocka på"	Markoolio vs. The Boppers
7 December 2001 (1w)	"Life"	E-type
14 December 2001 (3w)	"Rocka på"	Markoolio vs. The Boppers
14 January 2002 (3w)	"Life"	E-type
25 January 2002 (1w)	"Whenever, Wherever"	Shakira
1 February 2002 (2w)	"Luften bor i mina steg"	Håkan Hellström
15 February 2002 (5w)	"Whenever, Wherever"	Shakira
22 March 2002 (1w)	"Never Let It Go"	Afro-Dite
29 March 2002 (4w)	"Dom andra"	Kent
26 April 2002 (5w)	"Supernatural"	Supernatural
30 May 2002 (1w)	"Without Me"	Eminem
6 June 2002 (3w)	"Vi ska till VM!"	Magnus Uggla
27 June 2002 (2w)	"S:t Monica"	Ulf Lundell
11 July 2002 (9w)	"A Little Less Conversation"	Elvis Presley vs. JXL
12 September 2002 (17w)	"The Ketchup Song"	Las Ketchup
9 January 2003 (2w)	"Tu es foutu"	In-Grid
23 January 2003 (8w)	"Lose Yourself"	Eminem
20 March 2003 (1w)	"I Drove All Night"	Céline Dion
27 March 2003 (2w)	"Give Me Your Love"	Fame
10 April 2003 (1w)	"Not a Sinner Nor a Saint"	Alcazar
17 April 2003 (1w)	"Den andra kvinnan"	Glenmark, Eriksson, Strömstedt
24 April 2003 (1w)	"Anyone of Us"	Gareth Gates
1 May 2003 (1w)	"Give Me Your Love"	Fame
8 May 2003 (5w)	"Alive"	Da Buzz
12 June 2003 (1w)	"Without You"	Anders Johansson
18 June 2003 (3w)	"Every Way That I Can"	Sertab
11 July 2003 (8w)	"Här kommer alla känslorna (på en och samma gång)"	Per Gessle
5 September 2003 (1w)	"Where Is the Love?"	The Black Eyed Peas
12 September 2003 (2w)	"Aicha"	Outlandish
26 September 2003 (1w)	"When We Were Winning"	Broder Daniel
3 October 2003 (3w)	"Aicha"	Outlandish
24 October 2003 (1w)	"Om du stannar hos mig"	Nina & Kim
31 October 2003 (4w)	"Vilse i skogen"	Markoolio
28 November 2003 (1w)	"Starkare"	Sara Löfgren
5 December 2003 (1w)	"Vilse i skogen"	Markoolio
12 December 2003 (1w)	"Starkare"	Sara Löfgren
19 December 2003 (2w)	"Vilse i skogen"	Markoolio
2 January 2004 (1w)	"Hey Ya!"	OutKast
9 January 2004 (1w)	"Starkare"	Sara Löfgren
16 January 2004 (3w)	"Shut Up"	The Black Eyed Peas
6 February 2004 (1w)	"Behind Blue Eyes"	Limp Bizkit
13 February 2004 (1w)	"Kom hem hel igen"	Sandra Dahlberg
20 February 2004 (3w)	"Ding Dong Song"	Günther & The Sunshine Girls
12 March 2004 (2w)	"Fuck It (I Don't Want You Back)"	Eamon
26 March 2004 (7w)	"Det gör ont"	Lena Philipsson
14 May 2004 (1w)	"Teeny Weeny String Bikini"	Günther & The Sunshine Girls
21 May 2004 (1w)	"In med bollen"	Markoolio
28 May 2004 (3w)	"Tuffa tider (för en drömmare) / En sten vid en sjö i en skog"	Gyllene Tider
18 June 2004 (3w)	"Hej hej Monika"	Nic & the Family
9 July 2004 (1w)	"Ingen vill veta var du köpt din tröja"	Raymond & Maria
16 July 2004 (1w)	"Hej hej Monika"	Nic & The Family
23 July 2004 (4w)	"Ingen vill veta var du köpt din tröja"	Raymond & Maria
20 August 2004 (5w)	"Dragostea Din Tei"	Haiducii
24 September 2004 (1w)	"Elegi"	Lars Winnerbäck
1 October 2004 (1w)	"Boro Boro"	Arash
8 October 2004 (1w)	"Bigtime"	The Soundtrack of Our Lives
15 October 2004 (1w)	"Boro Boro"	Arash
22 October 2004 (3w)	"I Won't Cry"	Elin Lanto
11 November 2004 (1w)	"Call on Me"	Eric Prydz
18 November 2004 (1w)	"I Won't Cry"	Elin Lanto
25 November 2004 (1w)	"Touch Me"	Günther feat. Samantha Fox
2 December 2004 (1w)	"Call on Me"	Eric Prydz
9 December 2004 (7w)	"Coming True"	Daniel Lindström
27 January 2005 (1w)	"En midsommarnattsdröm"	Håkan Hellström
3 February 2005 (2w)	"Money for Nothing"	Darin
17 February 2005 (1w)	"Max 500"	Kent
24 February 2005 (2w)	"Money For Nothing"	Darin
10 March 2005 (1w)	"Alcastar"	Alcazar
17 March 2005 (1w)	"Vi kan gunga"	Jimmy Jansson
24 March 2005 (1w)	"Las Vegas"	Martin Stenmarck
31 March 2005 (1w)	"Håll om mig"	Nanne Grönvall
7 April 2005 (3w)	"What's in It for Me"	Amy Diamond
28 April 2005 (1w)	"Håll om mig"	Nanne Grönvall
5 May 2005 (1w)	"Schnappi, das kleine Krokodil"	Schnappi
12 May 2005 (1w)	"Palace & Main"	Kent
19 May 2005 (2w)	"Schnappi, das kleine Krokodil"	Schnappi
2 June 2005 (4w)	"My Number One"	Helena Paparizou
30 June 2005 (3w)	"Stort liv"	Lars Winnerbäck & Hovet
21 July 2005 (7w)	"Axel F"	Crazy Frog
8 September 2005 (1w)	"You're Beautiful"	James Blunt
15 September 2005 (1w)	"Step Up"	Darin
22 September 2005 (3w)	"You're Beautiful"	James Blunt
1 October 2005 (6w)	"Live Tomorrow"	Laleh
13 October 2005 (1w)	"Precious"	Depeche Mode
20 October 2005 (1w)	"Step Up"	Darin
27 October 2005 (1w)	"You're Beautiful"	James Blunt
3 November 2005 (1w)	"Fanfanfan"	Thåström
10 November 2005 (1w)	"The hjärta & smärta EP"	Kent
17 November 2005 (4w)	"Hung Up"	Madonna
15 December 2005 (5w)	"Right Here, Right Now (My Heart Belongs To You)"	Agnes
19 January 2006 (1w)	"Hung Up"	Madonna
26 January 2006 (1w)	"Right Here, Right Now (My Heart Belongs To You)"	Agnes
2 February 2006 (1w)	"Goodbye My Lover"	James Blunt
9 February 2006 (4w)	"Do What You're Told"	Sebastian
9 March 2006 (1w)	"Last Goodbye"	Da Buzz
16 March 2006 (1w)	"Lev livet!"	Magnus Carlsson
23 March 2006 (2w)	"Evighet" (in English "Invincible")	Carola
6 April 2006 (1w)	"Temple of Love"	BWO
13 April 2006 (1w)	"Evighet" (in English "Invincible")	Carola
20 April 2006 (1w)	"Temple of Love"	BWO
27 April 2006 (3w)	"Rain"	Ola
18 May 2006 (1w)	"Lovegun / Nightfever"	Andreas Lundstedt
25 May 2006 (10w)	"Who's da Man"	Elias feat. Frans
3 August 2006 (1w)	"Boten Anna"	Basshunter
10 August 2006 (1w)	"Heroes"	Helena Paparizou
17 August 2006 (1w)	"Boten Anna"	Basshunter
24 August 2006 (2w)	"The Reincarnation of Benjamin Breeg"	Iron Maiden
27 September 2006 (1w)	"Everytime We Touch"	Cascada
14 September 2006 (3w)	"Sjumilakliv"	Martin Stenmarck
5 October 2006 (1w)	"Oh Father"	Linda Sundblad
12 October 2006 (7w)	"Sjumilakliv"	Martin Stenmarck
30 November 2006 (1w)	"I Don't Feel Like Dancin'"	Scissor Sisters
7 December 2006 (7w)	"Everything Changes"	Markus Fagervall

== Swedish number-one singles and albums ==
=== 2007 ===
Date	Song title	Performer	Album title	Performer
4 January 2007	"Everything Changes"	Markus Fagervall	Echo Heart	Markus Fagervall
11 January 2007	"Everything Changes"	Markus Fagervall	40 ljuva år!	Lasse Stefanz
18 January 2007	"Everything Changes"	Markus Fagervall	40 ljuva år!	Lasse Stefanz
25 January 2007	"Don't You Know"	United DJ's vs. Pandora	40 ljuva år!	Lasse Stefanz
1 February 2007	"I Can't Say I'm Sorry"	Erik Segerstedt	This Is Who I Am	Salem Al Fakir
8 February 2007	"Värsta schlagern"	Markoolio & Linda Bengtzing	Not Too Late	Norah Jones
15 February 2007	"Värsta schlagern"	Markoolio & Linda Bengtzing	Not Too Late	Norah Jones
22 February 2007	"Tokyo"	Danny Saucedo	Not Too Late	Norah Jones
1 March 2007	"Tokyo"	Danny Saucedo	Oberoendeframkallande	Timbuktu
8 March 2007	"Girlfriend"	Avril Lavigne	Saxpartyfavoriter	Ingmar Nordströms
15 March 2007	"The Worrying Kind"	The Ark	Saxpartyfavoriter	Ingmar Nordströms
22 March 2007	"The Worrying Kind"	The Ark	The Very Best of Dolly Parton	Dolly Parton
29 March 2007	"The Worrying Kind"	The Ark	Trying to Recall	Marie Lindberg
5 April 2007 (4w)	"Cara Mia"	Måns Zelmerlöw	Sällskapet	Sällskapet
12 April 2007	"Cara Mia"	Måns Zelmerlöw	Svart blogg	Eldkvarn
19 April 2007	"Cara Mia"	Måns Zelmerlöw	Prayer for the Weekend	The Ark
26 April 2007	"Cara Mia"	Måns Zelmerlöw	Prayer for the Weekend	The Ark
3 May 2007	"The Worrying Kind"	The Ark	Prayer for the Weekend	The Ark
10 May 2007	"Dunka mig gul & blå"	Frida Murenius	Prayer for the Weekend	The Ark
17 May 2007	"Ingen sommar utan reggae"	Markoolio	Minutes to Midnight	Linkin Park
24 May 2007	"True Believer"	E-type	Bury the Lies	Takida
31 May 2007	"En händig man"	Per Gessle	Stand By For...	Måns Zelmerlöw
7 June 2007	"Play It for the Girls"	Danny Saucedo	Heart Beats	Danny Saucedo
14 June 2007	"Ingen sommar utan reggae"	Markoolio	Scream	Tokio Hotel
21 June 2007	"Ingen sommar utan reggae"	Markoolio	En händig man	Per Gessle
28 June 2007	"Natalie"	Ola Svensson	En händig man	Per Gessle
5 July 2007	"Natalie"	Ola Svensson	En händig man	Per Gessle
12 July 2007	"Ingen sommar utan reggae"	Markoolio	Vagabond	Lasse Stefanz
19 July 2007	"Ingen sommar utan reggae"	Markoolio	Vagabond	Lasse Stefanz
26 July 2007	"Natalie"	Ola Svensson	Vagabond	Lasse Stefanz
2 August 2007	"Natalie"	Ola Svensson	En blekt blondins ballader – 1980–2005	Eva Dahlgren
9 August 2007	"I'm Gay"	6 AM featuring Cissi Ramsby	En blekt blondins ballader – 1980–2005	Eva Dahlgren
16 August 2007	"Natalie"	Ola Svensson	The Essential Elvis Presley	Elvis Presley
23 August 2007	"Natalie"	Ola Svensson	The Essential Elvis Presley	Elvis Presley
30 August 2007 (3w)	"Om du lämnade mig nu"	Lars Winnerbäck ft. Miss Li	Mount Pleasure	Moneybrother
6 September 2007	"Om du lämnade mig nu"	Lars Winnerbäck ft. Miss Li	Mount Pleasure	Moneybrother
13 September 2007	"Om du lämnade mig nu"	Lars Winnerbäck ft. Miss Li	Night Falls Over Kortedala	Jens Lekman
20 September 2007	"100 år från nu (blundar)"	Martin Stenmarck	One Chance	Paul Potts
27 September 2007	"100 år från nu (blundar)"	Martin Stenmarck	One Chance	Paul Potts
4 October 2007	"100 år från nu (blundar)"	Martin Stenmarck	Daugava	Lars Winnerbäck
11 October 2007	"Pärlor åt svin"	Magnus Uggla	Magic	Bruce Springsteen
18 October 2007	"Pärlor åt svin"	Magnus Uggla	Tillbaka till samtiden	Kent
25 October 2007	"Pärlor åt svin"	Magnus Uggla	Tillbaka till samtiden	Kent
1 November 2007	"Västerbron & Vampires EP"	Laakso	Tillbaka till samtiden	Kent
8 November 2007	"Apologize"	Timbaland ft. OneRepublic	Tillbaka till samtiden	Kent
15 November 2007	"Apologize"	Timbaland ft. OneRepublic	One Chance	Paul Potts
22 November 2007	"S.O.S."	Ola Svensson	I denna natt blir världen ny	Carola
29 November 2007	"Apologize"	Timbaland ft. OneRepublic	I denna natt blir världen ny	Carola
6 December 2007	"Apologize"	Timbaland ft. OneRepublic	One Chance	Paul Potts
13 December 2007	"This Moment"	Marie Picasso	I denna natt blir världen ny	Carola
20 December 2007	"This Moment"	Marie Picasso	One Chance	Paul Potts
27 December 2007	"All for Love"	E.M.D.	The Secret	Marie Picasso

=== 2008 ===
Date	Song title	Performer	Album title	Performer
3 January 2008	"All for Love"	E.M.D.	The Secret	Marie Picasso
10 January 2008	"All for Love"	E.M.D.	The Secret	Marie Picasso
17 January 2008	"All for Love"	E.M.D.	Daugava	Lars Winnerbäck
24 January 2008	"All for Love"	E.M.D.	Still on Top - The Greatest Hits	Van Morrison
31 January 2008	"All for Love"	E.M.D.	Daugava	Lars Winnerbäck
7 February 2008	"Do You Love Me?"	Amanda Jenssen	The Irish Connection	Johnny Logan and Friends
14 February 2008	"Do You Love Me?"	Amanda Jenssen	e²	Eros Ramazzotti
21 February 2008	"Do You Love Me?"	Amanda Jenssen	e²	Eros Ramazzotti
28 February 2008	"Do You Love Me?"	Amanda Jenssen	e²	Eros Ramazzotti
7 March 2008	"Do You Love Me?"	Amanda Jenssen	e²	Eros Ramazzotti
14 March 2008	"Hero"	Charlotte Perrelli	e²	Eros Ramazzotti
21 March 2008	"Hero"	Charlotte Perrelli	e²	Eros Ramazzotti
28 March 2008	"Hero"	Charlotte Perrelli	e²	Eros Ramazzotti
3 April 2008	"Hero"	Charlotte Perrelli	För sent för edelweiss	Håkan Hellström
10 April 2008	"Hero"	Charlotte Perrelli	A Sense of Purpose	In Flames
17 April 2008	"Jennie Let Me Love You"	E.M.D.	Rockferry	Duffy
24 April 2008	"Jennie Let Me Love You"	E.M.D.	Stronger	Sanna Nielsen
1 May 2008	"Jennie Let Me Love You"	E.M.D.	Hard Candy	Madonna
8 May 2008	"Jennie Let Me Love You"	E.M.D.	Rockferry	Duffy
15 May 2008	"Jennie Let Me Love You"	E.M.D.	Killing My Darlings	Amanda Jenssen
22 May 2008	"Jennie Let Me Love You"	E.M.D.	A State of Mind	E.M.D.
29 May 2008	"Fotbollsfest"	Frans feat. Elias	Rockferry	Duffy
5 June 2008	"Cliffs of Gallipoli"	Sabaton	Rallarsväng	Lasse Stefanz
12 June 2008	"Sverige, det bästa på vår jord"	Markoolio	Rockferry	Duffy
19 June 2008	"I'm Yours"	Jason Mraz	Viva la Vida or Death and All His Friends	Coldplay
26 June 2008	"Football is Our Religion"	Rednex	Viva la Vida or Death and All His Friends	Coldplay
3 July 2008	"I'm yours"	Jason Mraz	Viva la Vida or Death and All His Friends	Coldplay
10 July 2008	"I'm yours"	Jason Mraz	Rockferry	Duffy
17 July 2008	"I'm yours"	Jason Mraz	Rockferry	Duffy
24 July 2008	"Curly Sue"	Takida	Rockferry	Duffy
31 July 2008	"Pick Me Up	Emilia de Poret	Rockferry	Duffy
7 August 2008	"I Kissed a Girl"	Katy Perry	Rockferry	Duffy
14 August 2008	"Raise the Banner"	The Poodles	Vi var där blixten hittade ner – Live hösten 2007	Lars Winnerbäck
21 August 2008	"Raise the Banner"	The Poodles	Backyard Babies	Backyard Babies
28 August 2008	"Där du andas"	Marie Fredriksson	Vi var där blixten hittade ner – Live hösten 2007	Lars Winnerbäck
4 September 2008	"I Kissed a Girl"	Katy Perry	All Hope Is Gone	Slipknot
11 September 2008	"I Kissed a Girl"	Katy Perry	The Ocean and Me	Sophie Zelmani
18 September 2008	"I Kissed a Girl"	Katy Perry	Death Magnetic	Metallica
25 September 2008	"Nu när du gått"	Lena + Orup	Death Magnetic	Metallica
2 October 2008	"Alone"	E.M.D.	Death Magnetic	Metallica
9 October 2008	"Nu när du gått"	Lena + Orup	Death Magnetic	Metallica
16 October 2008	"Womanizer"	Britney Spears	Förälskade	Thorleifs
23 October 2008	"A Million Candles Burning"	Martin Stenmarck	Black Ice	AC/DC
30 October 2008	"Silly Really"	Per Gessle	Black Ice	AC/DC
6 November 2008	"If I Were a Boy"	Beyoncé	Kent Box 1991–2008	Kent
13 November 2008	"If I Were a Boy"	Beyoncé	Black Ice	AC/DC
20 November 2008	"If I Were a Boy"	Beyoncé	Leaving on a Mayday	Anna Ternheim
27 November 2008	"If I Were a Boy"	Beyoncé	Omaha	Ulf Lundell
4 December 2008	"Radio"	Danny Saucedo	Our Christmas	Sanna, Shirley, Sonja
11 December 2008	"Radio"	Danny Saucedo	Our Christmas	Sanna, Shirley, Sonja
18 December 2008	"With Every Bit of Me"	Kevin Borg	Our Christmas	Sanna, Shirley, Sonja
25 December 2008	"With Every Bit of Me"	Kevin Borg	The Promise	Il Divo

=== 2009 ===
Date	Song title	Performer	Album title	Performer
2 January 2009	"With Every Bit of Me"	Kevin Borg	På vårt sätt	Scotts
9 January 2009	"With Every Bit of Me"	Kevin Borg	På vårt sätt	Scotts
16 January 2009	"Poker Face"	Lady Gaga	På vårt sätt	Scotts
23 January 2009	"With Every Bit of Me"	Kevin Borg	På vårt sätt	Scotts
30 January 2009	"Poker Face"	Lady Gaga	Working on a Dream	Bruce Springsteen
6 February 2009	"Carina"	Larz-Kristerz	Working on a Dream	Bruce Springsteen
13 February 2009	"3 Floors Down"	Kim Fransson	Working on a Dream	Bruce Springsteen
20 February 2009	"Poker Face"	Lady Gaga	Working on a Dream	Bruce Springsteen
27 February 2009	"Poker Face"	Lady Gaga	Hem till dig	Larz-Kristerz
6 March 2009	"Med hjärtat fyllt av ljus"	Shirley Clamp	Hem till dig	Larz-Kristerz
13 March 2009	"Baby Goodbye"	E.M.D.	Hem till dig	Larz-Kristerz
20 March 2009	"Baby Goodbye"	E.M.D.	Kärlek är för dom	Thåström
27 March 2009	"Tingaliin"	P-Bros feat. DJ Trexx & Olga Pratilova	Så gör jag det igen	Caroline af Ugglas
3 April 2009	"Tingaliin"	P-Bros feat. DJ Trexx & Olga Pratilova	Så gör jag det igen	Caroline af Ugglas
10 April 2009	"Tingaliin"	P-Bros feat. DJ Trexx & Olga Pratilova	Kent Box 1991–2008	Kent
17 April 2009	"Tingaliin"	P-Bros feat. DJ Trexx & Olga Pratilova	Så gör jag det igen	Caroline af Ugglas
24 April 2009	"Emma-Lee"	Johan Palm	Sounds of the Universe	Depeche Mode
1 May 2009	"Losing You"	Dead by April	Sounds of the Universe	Depeche Mode
8 May 2009	"Losing You"	Dead by April	Together Through Life	Bob Dylan
15 May 2009	"Svennebanan"	Promoe	Together Through Life	Bob Dylan
22 May 2009	"Fairytale"	Alexander Rybak	21st Century Breakdown	Green Day
29 May 2009	"Fairytale"	Alexander Rybak	MZW	Måns Zelmerlöw
5 June 2009	"Fairytale"	Alexander Rybak	A Band's Gotta Do; What A Band's Gotta Do	The Refreshments
12 June 2009	"Fairytale"	Alexander Rybak	Truck Stop	Lasse Stefanz
19 June 2009	"Fairytale"	Alexander Rybak	Greatest Hits	Bruce Springsteen & The E Street Band
26 June 2009	"Ayo Technology"	Milow	Greatest Hits	Bruce Springsteen & The E Street Band
3 July 2009	"Rap das Armas"	Cidinho e Doca	Masser af succes – Greatest Hits & Greatest Live	Gasolin'
10 July 2009	"Sky's the Limit"	Ola	La Voix du Nord	Malena Ernman
17 July 2009	"Handful of Keys"	Robert Wells	Masser af succes – Greatest Hits & Greatest Live	Gasolin'
24 July 2009	"Rap das Armas"	Cidinho e Doca	Masser af succes – Greatest Hits & Greatest Live	Gasolin'
31 July 2009	"Rap das Armas"	Cidinho e Doca	Masser af succes – Greatest Hits & Greatest Live	Gasolin'
7 August 2009	"Rap das Armas"	Cidinho e Doca	Längtan	Scotts
14 August 2009	"Celebration"	Madonna	Masser af succes – Greatest Hits & Greatest Live	Gasolin'
21 August 2009	"Celebration"	Madonna	Masser af succes – Greatest Hits & Greatest Live	Gasolin'
28 August 2009	"Jag får liksom ingen ordning"	Lars Winnerbäck	Masser af succes – Greatest Hits & Greatest Live	Gasolin'
4 September 2009	"Jag får liksom ingen ordning"	Lars Winnerbäck	Moving On	Sarah Dawn Finer
11 September 2009	"I Gotta Feeling"	The Black Eyed Peas	The Darker Instinct	Takida
18 September 2009	"I Gotta Feeling"	The Black Eyed Peas	Last Look at Eden	Europe
25 September 2009	"I Gotta Feeling"	The Black Eyed Peas	Tänk om jag ångrar mig och sen ångrar mig igen	Lars Winnerbäck
2 October 2009	"1000 nålar"	Martin Stenmarck	Tänk om jag ångrar mig och sen ångrar mig igen	Lars Winnerbäck
9 October 2009	"I Gotta Feeling"	The Black Eyed Peas	Om du vill	Larz-Kristerz
16 October 2009	"Töntarna"	Kent	My One and Only Thrill	Melody Gardot
23 October 2009	"Töntarna"	Kent	My One and Only Thrill	Melody Gardot
30 October 2009	"Viva la Vida"	Darin	My One and Only Thrill	Melody Gardot
6 November 2009	"Viva la Vida"	Darin	This Is It Soundtrack	Michael Jackson Soundtrack
13 November 2009	"2000"	Kent	Röd	Kent
20 November 2009	"Bad Romance"	Lady Gaga	Röd	Kent
27 November 2009	"Bad Romance"	Lady Gaga	Röd	Kent
4 December 2009	"Bad Romance"	Lady Gaga	Be-bop-a-lula hela jävla dan (1989–2009)	Thåström
11 December 2009	"Bad Romance"	Lady Gaga	My One and Only Thrill	Melody Gardot
18 December 2009	"Higher"	Erik Grönwall	Harmony	The Priests
25 December 2009	"Higher"	Erik Grönwall	Erik Grönwall	Erik Grönwall

=== 2010 ===
Week	Date	Song title	Performer	Album title	Performer
	1 January 2010	"Higher"	Erik Grönwall	Erik Grönwall	Erik Grönwall
1	8 January 2010	"Higher"	Erik Grönwall	Erik Grönwall	Erik Grönwall
2	15 January 2010	"Higher"	Erik Grönwall	Erik Grönwall	Erik Grönwall
3	22 January 2010	"Bad Romance"	Lady Gaga	Strike!	The Baseballs
4	29 January 2010	"Higher"	Erik Grönwall	Strike!	The Baseballs
5	5 February 2010	"Bad Romance"	Lady Gaga	Strike!	The Baseballs
6	12 February 2010	"Fireflies"	Owl City	Rock'n Roll Dance Party	The Playtons
7	19 February 2010	"Ambitions"	Donkeyboy	Soldier of Love	Sade
8	26 February 2010	"Famous"	Play	Rock'n Roll Dance Party	The Playtones
9	5 March 2010	"This Is My Life"	Anna Bergendahl	Rock'n Roll Dance Party	The Playtones
10	12 March 2010	"This Is My Life"	Anna Bergendahl	Rock'n Roll Dance Party	The Playtones
11	19 March 2010	"This Is My Life"	Anna Bergendahl	Ignore This	Salem Al Fakir
12	26 March 2010	"This Is My Life"	Anna Bergendahl	Ignore This	Salem Al Fakir
13	2 April 2010	"Unstoppable (The Return of Natalie)"	Ola Svensson	Jajamen	Rolandz
14	9 April 2010	"Manboy"	Eric Saade	Jajamen	Rolandz
15	16 April 2010	"Stereo Love"	Edward Maya & Vika Jigulina	Slash	Slash
16	23 April 2010	"Stereo Love"	Edward Maya & Vika Jigulina	Yours Sincerely	Anna Bergendahl
17	30 April 2010	"Manboy"	Eric Saade	Iron Man 2 Soundtrack	AC/DC Soundtrack
18	7 May 2010	"Hurricane"	Rebound!	Längtan	Timoteij
19	14 May 2010	"Stereo Love"	Edward Maya & Vika Jigulina	Iron Man 2 Soundtrack	AC/DC Soundtrack
20	21 May 2010	"Stereo Love"	Edward Maya & Vika Jigulina	Iron Man 2 Soundtrack	AC/DC Soundtrack
21	28 May 2010	"Manboy"	Eric Saade	Exile on Main St.	The Rolling Stones
22	4 June 2010	"Satellite"	Lena	Texas	Lasse Stefanz
23	11 June 2010	"Satellite"	Lena	Texas	Lasse Stefanz
24	18 June 2010	"Satellite"	Lena	Texas	Lasse Stefanz
25	25 June 2010	"Gamla Ullevi"	Kent	Body Talk Pt. 1	Robyn
26	2 July 2010	"When You Tell the World You're Mine"	Agnes & Björn	En plats i solen	Kent
27	9 July 2010	"We No Speak Americano"	Yolanda Be Cool & DCUP	En plats i solen	Kent
28	16 July 2010	"We No Speak Americano"	Yolanda Be Cool & DCUP	En plats i solen	Kent
29	23 July 2010	"Overdrive"	Ola	En plats i solen	Kent
30	30 July 2010	"Dancing on My Own"	Robyn	En plats i solen	Kent
31	6 August 2010	"Dancing on My Own"	Robyn	Shakin' Stevens – The Collection	Shakin' Stevens
32	13 August 2010	"Waka Waka (This Time for Africa)"	Shakira feat. Freshlyground	En plats i solen	Kent
33	20 August 2010	"Love the Way You Lie"	Eminem feat. Rihanna	The Final Frontier	Iron Maiden
34	27 August 2010	"Love the Way You Lie"	Eminem feat. Rihanna	The Final Frontier	Iron Maiden
35	3 September 2010	"Love the Way You Lie"	Eminem feat. Rihanna	Lovekiller	Darin
36	10 September 2010	"Love the Way You Lie"	Eminem feat. Rihanna	The Final Frontier	Iron Maiden
37	17 September 2010	"Waka Waka (This Time for Africa)"	Shakira feat. Freshlyground	Body Talk Pt. 2	Robyn
38	24 September 2010	"Love the Way You Lie"	Eminem feat. Rihanna	Beyond Hell/Above Heaven	Volbeat
39	1 October 2010	"Black Fender"	Hans Edler	Beyond Hell/Above Heaven	Volbeat
40	8 October 2010	"Black Fender"	Hans Edler	Små ord av guld	Larz-Kristerz
41	15 October 2010	"Waka Waka (This Time for Africa)"	Shakira feat. Freshlyground	Små ord av guld	Larz-Kristerz
42	22 October 2010	"Från och med du"	Oskar Linnros	Steg från paradise	Håkan Hellström
43	29 October 2010	"Gubben i lådan"	Daniel Adams-Ray	Steg från paradise	Håkan Hellström
44	5 November 2010	"Gubben i lådan"	Daniel Adams-Ray	New Orleans	Bo Kaspers Orkester
45	12 November 2010	"Gubben i lådan"	Daniel Adams-Ray	Greatest Hits	Bon Jovi
46	19 November 2010	"Gubben i lådan"	Daniel Adams-Ray	The Promise	Bruce Springsteen
47	26 November 2010	"Mikrofonkåt"	September	The Promise	Bruce Springsteen
48	3 December 2010	"Mikrofonkåt"	September	The Promise	Bruce Springsteen
49	10 December 2010	"Mikrofonkåt"	September	The Promise	Bruce Springsteen
50	17 December 2010	"Mikrofonkåt"	September	Michael	Michael Jackson
51	24 December 2010	"Mikrofonkåt"	September	Jay Smith	Jay Smith
52	31 December 2010	"Mikrofonkåt"	September	Jay Smith	Jay Smith

=== 2011 ===
Week	Date	Song title	Performer	Album title	Performer
1	7 January 2011	"Mikrofonkåt"	September	Jay Smith	Jay Smith
2	14 January 2011	"Mikrofonkåt"	September	Jay Smith	Jay Smith
3	21 January 2011	"Mikrofonkåt"	September	Jay Smith	Jay Smith
4	28 January 2011	"Mikrofonkåt"	September	Jay Smith	Jay Smith
5	4 February 2011	"Mikrofonkåt"	September	Stans Bästa Band: 1971–2011 – De Första 40 Åren	Eldkvarn
6	11 February 2011	"Grenade"	Bruno Mars	Stans Bästa Band: 1971–2011 – De Första 40 Åren	Eldkvarn
7	18 February 2011	"Grenade"	Bruno Mars	Det här är bara början	Elisa's
8	25 February 2011	"Born This Way"	Lady Gaga	Love CPR	September
9	4 March 2011	"Grenade"	Bruno Mars	Love CPR	September
10	11 March 2011	"Popular"	Eric Saade	Love CPR	September
11	18 March 2011	"Popular"	Eric Saade	Rock'N Roll Is King	The Playtones
12	25 March 2011	"Popular"	Eric Saade	Rock'N Roll Is King	The Playtones
13	1 April 2011	"Popular"	Eric Saade	Hisingen Blues	Graveyard
14	8 April 2011	"On the Floor"	Jennifer Lopez feat. Pitbull	Euphoric Heartbreak	Glasvegas
15	15 April 2011	"Popular"	Eric Saade	Wasting Light	Foo Fighters
16	22 April 2011	"On the Floor"	Jennifer Lopez feat. Pitbull	Elvis, Barbra & jag	Carola
17	29 April 2011	"On the Floor"	Jennifer Lopez feat. Pitbull	Performocracy	The Poodles
18	6 May 2011	"Jag kommer"	Veronica Maggio	Satan i gatan	Veronica Maggio
19	13 May 2011	"Jag kommer"	Veronica Maggio	Satan i gatan	Veronica Maggio
20	20 May 2011	"Om sanningen ska fram"	Eric Amarillo	Satan i gatan	Veronica Maggio
21	27 May 2011	"Om sanningen ska fram"	Eric Amarillo	Born This Way	Lady Gaga
22	3 June 2011	"Om sanningen ska fram"	Eric Amarillo	Musik før nyskilda	Mauro Scocco
23	10 June 2011	"Om sanningen ska fram"	Eric Amarillo	Ridin' Along With the Refreshments	The Refreshments
24	17 June 2011	"Om sanningen ska fram"	Eric Amarillo	Cuba Libre	Lasse Stefanz
25	24 June 2011	"Om sanningen ska fram"	Eric Amarillo	Cuba Libre	Lasse Stefanz
26	1 July 2011	"What Are Words"	Chris Medina	Cuba Libre	Lasse Stefanz
27	8 July 2011	"What Are Words"	Chris Medina	Saade Vol. 1	Eric Saade
28	15 July 2011	"What Are Words"	Chris Medina	Saade Vol. 1	Eric Saade
29	22 July 2011	"What Are Words"	Chris Medina	Saade Vol. 1	Eric Saade
30	29 July 2011	"What Are Words"	Chris Medina	O klang och jubeltid	Benny Anderssons Orkester
31	5 August 2011	"What Are Words"	Chris Medina	O klang och jubeltid	Benny Anderssons Orkester
32	12 August 2011	"What Are Words"	Chris Medina	The Burning Heart	Takida
33	19 August 2011	"What Are Words"	Chris Medina	Saade Vol. 1	Eric Saade
34	26 August 2011	"Vem Dançar Kuduro"	Lucenzo feat. Big Ali	Saade Vol. 1	Eric Saade
35	2 September 2011	"Vart jag mig i världen vänder"	Den Svenska Björnstammen	Ulrik Munther	Ulrik Munther
36	9 September 2011	"Vart jag mig i världen vänder"	Den Svenska Björnstammen	I'm With You	Red Hot Chili Peppers
37	16 September 2011	"Vart jag mig i världen vänder"	Den Svenska Björnstammen	It All Starts with One	Ane Brun
38	23 September 2011	"Moves Like Jagger"	Maroon 5 feat. Christina Aguilera	Innan jag kände dig	Melissa Horn
39	30 September 2011	"Vart jag mig i världen vänder"	Den Svenska Björnstammen	Innan jag kände dig	Melissa Horn
40	7 October 2011	"Vart jag mig i världen vänder"	Den Svenska Björnstammen	Flirting with Disaster	Jill Johnson
41	14 October 2011	"Vart jag mig i världen vänder"	Den Svenska Björnstammen	21	Adele
42	21 October 2011	"We Found Love"	Rihanna feat. Calvin Harris	21	Adele
43	28 October 2011	"We Found Love"	Rihanna feat. Calvin Harris	Mylo Xyloto	Coldplay
44	4 November 2011	"We Found Love"	Rihanna feat. Calvin Harris	Mylo Xyloto	Coldplay
45	11 November 2011	"We Found Love"	Rihanna feat. Calvin Harris	Innan filmen tagit slut...	Magnus Uggla
46	18 November 2011	"We Found Love"	Rihanna feat. Calvin Harris	Frän Älvdalen till Nashville	Larz-Kristerz
47	25 November 2011	"Levels"	Avicii	Break the Spell	Björn Skifs
48	2 December 2011	"Levels"	Avicii	Up All Night	One Direction
49	9 December 2011	"Levels"	Avicii	Saade Vol. 2	Eric Saade
50	16 December 2011	"Levels"	Avicii	Christmas	Michael Bublé
51	23 December 2011	"All This Way"	Amanda Fondell	Christmas	Michael Bublé
52	30 December 2011	"Levels"	Avicii	All This Way	Amanda Fondell

=== 2012 ===
Week	Date	Song title	Performer	Album title	Performer
1	6 January 2012	"Levels"	Avicii	All This Way	Amanda Fondell
2	13 January 2012	"Levels"	Avicii	My Versions	Robin Stjernberg
3	20 January 2012	"Levels"	Avicii	Made in Germany 1995–2011	Rammstein
4	27 January 2012	"Levels"	Avicii	The Lion's Roar	First Aid Kit
5	3 February 2012	"Äckligt"	Ansiktet	Sjung	Laleh
6	10 February 2012	"Äckligt"	Ansiktet	Sjung	Laleh
7	17 February 2012	"Äckligt"	Ansiktet	Sjung	Laleh
8	24 February 2012	"Ai Se Eu Te Pego!"	Michel Teló	Beväpna dig med vingar	Thåström
9	2 March 2012	"Ai Se Eu Te Pego!"	Michel Teló	Beväpna dig med vingar	Thåström
10	9 March 2012	"Euphoria"	Loreen	Wrecking Ball	Bruce Springsteen
11	16 March 2012	"Euphoria"	Loreen	Wrecking Ball	Bruce Springsteen
12	23 March 2012	"Euphoria"	Loreen	Wrecking Ball	Bruce Springsteen
13	30 March 2012	"Euphoria"	Loreen	MDNA	Madonna
14	6 April 2012	"Euphoria"	Loreen	Mänsklig värme	Markus Krunegård
15	13 April 2012	"Euphoria"	Loreen	Wrecking Ball	Bruce Springsteen
16	20 April 2012	"Somebody That I Used to Know"	Gotye feat. Kimbra	Sjung	Laleh
17	27 April 2012	"Somebody That I Used to Know"	Gotye feat. Kimbra	Throw It to the Universe	The Soundtrack of Our Lives
18	4 May 2012	"Somebody That I Used to Know"	Gotye feat. Kimbra	Jag är inte rädd för mörkret	Kent
19	11 May 2012	"Dansa pausa"	Panetoz	Jag är inte rädd för mörkret	Kent
20	18 May 2012	"Dansa pausa"	Panetoz	Jag är inte rädd för mörkret	Kent
21	25 May 2012	"Dansa pausa"	Panetoz	Get Started	David Lindgren
22	1 June 2012	"Whistle"	Flo Rida	Rocky Mountains	Lasse Stefanz
23	8 June 2012	"Whistle"	Flo Rida	Rocky Mountains	Lasse Stefanz
24	15 June 2012	"Whistle"	Flo Rida	Rocky Mountains	Lasse Stefanz
25	22 June 2012	"Whistle"	Flo Rida	Believe	Justin Bieber
26	29 June 2012	"Whistle"	Flo Rida	Believe	Justin Bieber
27	6 July 2012	"Whistle"	Flo Rida	40/40: 40 År 40 Hits – Ett Samlingsalbum 1972–2012	Tomas Ledin
28	13 July 2012	"Flytta på dej!"	Alina Devecerski	40/40: 40 År 40 Hits – Ett Samlingsalbum 1972–2012	Tomas Ledin
29	20 July 2012	"Flytta på dej!"	Alina Devecerski	40/40: 40 År 40 Hits – Ett Samlingsalbum 1972–2012	Tomas Ledin
30	27 July 2012	"Whistle"	Flo Rida	40/40: 40 År 40 Hits – Ett Samlingsalbum 1972–2012	Tomas Ledin
31	3 August 2012	"Whistle"	Flo Rida	40/40: 40 År 40 Hits – Ett Samlingsalbum 1972–2012	Tomas Ledin
32	10 August 2012	"Vart jag än går"	Stiftelsen	Unchained	Molly Sandén
33	17 August 2012	"Vart jag än går"	Stiftelsen	40/40: 40 År 40 Hits – Ett Samlingsalbum 1972–2012	Tomas Ledin
34	24 August 2012	"Vart jag än går"	Stiftelsen	40/40: 40 År 40 Hits – Ett Samlingsalbum 1972–2012	Tomas Ledin
35	31 August 2012	"Vart jag än går"	Stiftelsen	40/40: 40 År 40 Hits – Ett Samlingsalbum 1972–2012	Tomas Ledin
36	7 September 2012	"Vart jag än går"	Stiftelsen	40/40: 40 År 40 Hits – Ett Samlingsalbum 1972–2012	Tomas Ledin
37	14 September 2012	"Vart jag än går"	Stiftelsen	Tempest	Bob Dylan
38	21 September 2012	"Hungry Hearts"	Nause	Tempest	Bob Dylan
39	28 September 2012	"Don't You Worry Child"	Swedish House Mafia feat. John Martin	The Truth About Love	Pink
40	5 October 2012	"Don't You Worry Child"	Swedish House Mafia feat. John Martin	Svag doft av skymning	Peter LeMarc
41	12 October 2012	"Don't You Worry Child"	Swedish House Mafia feat. John Martin	Rent förbannat	Ulf Lundell
42	19 October 2012	"Don't You Worry Child"	Swedish House Mafia feat. John Martin	Rent förbannat	Ulf Lundell
43	26 October 2012	"Don't You Worry Child"	Swedish House Mafia feat. John Martin	Inferno	Petra Marklund
44	2 November 2012	"Don't You Worry Child"	Swedish House Mafia feat. John Martin	Heal	Loreen
45	9 November 2012	"Don't You Worry Child"	Swedish House Mafia feat. John Martin	Infruset	Mando Diao
46	16 November 2012	"Don't You Worry Child"	Swedish House Mafia feat. John Martin	Take Me Home	One Direction
47	23 November 2012	"Don't You Worry Child"	Swedish House Mafia feat. John Martin	Infruset	Mando Diao
48	30 November 2012	"Don't You Worry Child"	Swedish House Mafia feat. John Martin	Infruset	Mando Diao
49	7 December 2012	"Don't You Worry Child"	Swedish House Mafia feat. John Martin	Infruset	Mando Diao
50	14 December 2012	"Don't You Worry Child"	Swedish House Mafia feat. John Martin	Infruset	Mando Diao
51	21 December 2012	"Don't You Worry Child"	Swedish House Mafia feat. John Martin	Infruset	Mando Diao
52	28 December 2012	"Radioactive"	Imagine Dragons	Infruset	Mando Diao

=== 2013 ===
Week	Date	Song title	Performer	Album title	Performer
1	4 January 2013	"En apa som liknar dig"	Darin	Infruset	Mando Diao
2	11 January 2013	"När solen går ner"	Aki feat. Kapten Röd	Infruset	Mando Diao
3	18 January 2013	"När solen går ner"	Aki feat. Kapten Röd	Infruset	Mando Diao
4	25 January 2013	"När solen går ner"	Aki feat. Kapten Röd	Infruset	Mando Diao
5	1 February 2013	"Let Her Go"	Passenger	Infruset	Mando Diao
6	8 February 2013	"Let Her Go"	Passenger	Exit	Darin
7	15 February 2013	"Let Her Go"	Passenger	Infruset	Mando Diao
8	22 February 2013	"Uncover"	Zara Larsson	Infruset	Mando Diao
9	1 March 2013	"Uncover"	Zara Larsson	Infruset	Mando Diao
10	8 March 2013	"Let Her Go"	Passenger	Smashing to the Ground	Top Cats
11	15 March 2013	"You"	Robin Stjernberg	The Next Day	David Bowie
12	22 March 2013	"You"	Robin Stjernberg	What About Now	Bon Jovi
13	29 March 2013	"You"	Robin Stjernberg	Delta Machine	Depeche Mode
14	5 April 2013	"You"	Robin Stjernberg	Break the Border	Yohio
15	12 April 2013	"You"	Robin Stjernberg	Break the Border	Yohio
16	19 April 2013	"Just Give Me a Reason"	Pink feat. Nate Ruess	Infestissumam	Ghost
17	26 April 2013	"Just Give Me a Reason"	Pink feat. Nate Ruess	Det kommer aldrig va över för mig	Håkan Hellström
18	3 May 2013	"Just Give Me a Reason"	Pink feat. Nate Ruess	Dags att tänka på refrängen	Gyllene Tider
19	10 May 2013	"Can't Hold Us"	Macklemore and Ryan Lewis feat. Ray Dalton	Dags att tänka på refrängen	Gyllene Tider
20	17 May 2013	"Can't Hold Us"	Macklemore and Ryan Lewis feat. Ray Dalton	Dags att tänka på refrängen	Gyllene Tider
21	24 May 2013	"Can't Hold Us"	Macklemore and Ryan Lewis feat. Ray Dalton	Dags att tänka på refrängen	Gyllene Tider
22	31 May 2013	"Can't Hold Us"	Macklemore and Ryan Lewis feat. Ray Dalton	Dags att tänka på refrängen	Gyllene Tider
23	7 June 2013	"Can't Hold Us"	Macklemore and Ryan Lewis feat. Ray Dalton	Dags att tänka på refrängen	Gyllene Tider
24	14 June 2013	"Can't Hold Us"	Macklemore and Ryan Lewis feat. Ray Dalton	Dags att tänka på refrängen	Gyllene Tider
25	21 June 2013	"Can't Hold Us"	Macklemore and Ryan Lewis feat. Ray Dalton	13	Black Sabbath
26	28 June 2013	"Wake Me Up!"	Avicii	Trouble Boys	Lasse Stefanz
27	5 July 2013	"Wake Me Up!"	Avicii	Trouble Boys	Lasse Stefanz
28	12 July 2013	"Wake Me Up!"	Avicii	Dags att tänka på refrängen	Gyllene Tider
29	19 July 2013	"Wake Me Up!"	Avicii	Trouble Boys	Lasse Stefanz
30	26 July 2013	"Wake Me Up!"	Avicii	Trouble Boys	Lasse Stefanz
31	2 August 2013	"Wake Me Up!"	Avicii	Trouble Boys	Lasse Stefanz
32	9 August 2013	"Wake Me Up!"	Avicii	Trouble Boys	Lasse Stefanz
33	16 August 2013	"Wake Me Up!"	Avicii	Trouble Boys	Lasse Stefanz
34	23 August 2013	"Wake Me Up!"	Avicii	The Wild Hunt	Watain
35	30 August 2013	"Wake Me Up!"	Avicii	Another Self Portrait (1969–1971)	Bob Dylan
36	6 September 2013	"Wake Me Up!"	Avicii	Forgive Me	Eric Saade
37	13 September 2013	"Wake Me Up!"	Avicii	Searching for Sugar Man	Rodriguez
38	20 September 2013	"You Make Me"	Avicii	True	Avicii
39	27 September 2013	"Hey Brother"	Avicii	Hosianna	Lars Winnerbäck
40	4 October 2013	"Hey Brother"	Avicii	True	Avicii
41	11 October 2013	"Hey Brother"	Avicii	Handen i fickan fast jag bryr mig	Veronica Maggio
42	18 October 2013	"Hey Brother"	Avicii	Handen i fickan fast jag bryr mig	Veronica Maggio
43	25 October 2013	"Hey Brother"	Avicii	Handen i fickan fast jag bryr mig	Veronica Maggio
44	1 November 2013	"Hey Brother"	Avicii	Höga kusten	Tomas Ledin
45	8 November 2013	"Hey Brother"	Avicii	Dopet	Stiftelsen
46	15 November 2013	"The Monster"	Eminem feat. Rihanna	True	Avicii
47	22 November 2013	"The Monster"	Eminem feat. Rihanna	True	Avicii
48	29 November 2013	"The Monster"	Eminem feat. Rihanna	Midnight Memories	One Direction
49	6 December 2013	"Timber"	Pitbull feat. Ke$ha	Trunk	Ulf Lundell
50	13 December 2013	"Timber"	Pitbull feat. Ke$ha	Lasse Stefanz stora julparty	Lasse Stefanz
51	20 December 2013	"Timber"	Pitbull feat. Ke$ha	Lasse Stefanz stora julparty	Lasse Stefanz
52	27 December 2013	"Timber"	Pitbull feat. Ke$ha	Lasse Stefanz stora julparty	Lasse Stefanz

=== 2014 ===
Week	Date	Song title	Performer	Album title	Performer
1	3 January 2014	"Timber"	Pitbull feat. Ke$ha	True	Avicii
2	10 January 2014	"Timber"	Pitbull feat. Ke$ha	True	Avicii
3	17 January 2014	"I See Fire"	Ed Sheeran	High Hopes	Bruce Springsteen
4	24 January 2014	"I See Fire"	Ed Sheeran	High Hopes	Bruce Springsteen
5	31 January 2014	"I See Fire"	Ed Sheeran	True	Avicii
6	7 February 2014	"I See Fire"	Ed Sheeran	Christer Sjögren sjunger Sinatra	Christer Sjögren
7	14 February 2014	"I See Fire"	Ed Sheeran	Christer Sjögren sjunger Sinatra	Christer Sjögren
8	21 February 2014	"I See Fire"	Ed Sheeran	True	Avicii
9	28 February 2014	"I See Fire"	Ed Sheeran	True	Avicii
10	7 March 2014	"Busy Doin' Nothin'"	Ace Wilder	True	Avicii
11	14 March 2014	"Busy Doin' Nothin'"	Ace Wilder	True	Avicii
12	21 March 2014	"Busy Doin' Nothin'"	Ace Wilder	All Turns Red	Takida
13	28 March 2014	"Busy Doin' Nothin'"	Ace Wilder	Together We Stand Alone	Yohio
14	4 April 2014	"Rather Be"	Clean Bandit featuring Jess Glynne	True	Avicii
15	11 April 2014	"Waves (Robin Schulz Remix)"	Mr. Probz	Of the Grid	The Fooo
16	18 April 2014	"Waves (Robin Schulz Remix)"	Mr. Probz	Livemusiken från Jills veranda Nashville	Jill Johnson
17	25 April 2014	"Waves (Robin Schulz Remix)"	Mr. Probz	Livemusiken från Jills veranda Nashville	Jill Johnson
18	2 May 2014	"All of Me"	John Legend	Aelita	Mando Diao
19	9 May 2014	"All of Me"	John Legend	Tigerdrottningen	Kent
20	16 May 2014	"All of Me"	John Legend	Tigerdrottningen	Kent
21	22 May 2014	"All of Me"	John Legend	Heroes	Sabaton
22	29 May 2014	"All of Me"	John Legend	Ghost Stories	Coldplay
23	5 June 2014	"All of Me"	John Legend	Going Down to the River	Doug Seegers
24	12 June 2014	"All of Me"	John Legend	Stay Gold	First Aid Kit
25	19 June 2014	"All of Me"	John Legend	Stay Gold	First Aid Kit
26	26 June 2014	"All of Me"	John Legend	Honky Tonk Rebels	Lasse Stefanz
27	3 July 2014	"Din soldat"	Albin feat. Kristin Amparo	Honky Tonk Rebels	Lasse Stefanz
28	10 July 2014	"Din soldat"	Albin feat. Kristin Amparo	7	Sanna Nielsen
29	17 July 2014	"Din soldat"	Albin feat. Kristin Amparo	Honky Tonk Rebels	Lasse Stefanz
30	24 July 2014	"Din soldat"	Albin feat. Kristin Amparo	Honky Tonk Rebels	Lasse Stefanz
31	31 July 2014	"Prayer in C (Robin Schulz Remix)"	Lilly Wood & The Prick and Robin Schulz	X	Ed Sheeran
32	7 August 2014	"Prayer in C (Robin Schulz Remix)"	Lilly Wood & The Prick and Robin Schulz	Honky Tonk Rebels	Lasse Stefanz
33	14 August 2014	"Prayer in C (Robin Schulz Remix)"	Lilly Wood & The Prick and Robin Schulz	Going Down to the River	Doug Seegers
34	21 August 2014	"Prayer in C (Robin Schulz Remix)"	Lilly Wood & The Prick and Robin Schulz	In the Lonely Hour	Sam Smith
35	28 August 2014	"Prayer in C (Robin Schulz Remix)"	Lilly Wood & The Prick and Robin Schulz	Stay Gold	First Aid Kit
36	4 September 2014	"I'm an Albatraoz"	AronChupa	(r)Evolution	HammerFall
37	11 September 2014	"I'm an Albatraoz"	AronChupa	Siren Charms	In Flames
38	18 September 2014	"I'm an Albatraoz"	AronChupa	In the Lonely Hour	Sam Smith
39	25 September 2014	"Blame"	Calvin Harris feat. John Newman	World on Fire	Slash
40	2 October 2014	"Blame"	Calvin Harris feat. John Newman	Going Down to the River	Doug Seegers
41	9 October 2014	"Blame"	Calvin Harris feat. John Newman	1	Zara Larsson
42	16 October 2014	"The Days"	Avicii	X	Ed Sheeran
43	23 October 2014	"The Days"	Avicii	X	Ed Sheeran
44	30 October 2014	"The Days"	Avicii	Songs for Daddy	Jill Johnson
45	6 November 2014	"Cheerleader (Felix Jaehn Remix Radio Edit)"	OMI	Songs for Daddy	Jill Johnson
46	13 November 2014	"Cheerleader (Felix Jaehn Remix Radio Edit)"	OMI	Songs for Daddy	Jill Johnson
47	20 November 2014	"Cheerleader (Felix Jaehn Remix Radio Edit)"	OMI	The Endless River	Pink Floyd
48	27 November 2014	"Cheerleader (Felix Jaehn Remix Radio Edit)"	OMI	Four	One Direction
49	4 December 2014	"Cheerleader (Felix Jaehn Remix Radio Edit)"	OMI	Rock or Bust	AC/DC
50	11 December 2014	"Cheerleader (Felix Jaehn Remix Radio Edit)"	OMI	Håkan boma ye!	Håkan Hellström
51	18 December 2014	"Cheerleader (Felix Jaehn Remix Radio Edit)"	OMI	Rock or Bust	AC/DC
52	25 December 2014	"Cheerleader (Felix Jaehn Remix Radio Edit)"	OMI	Hommage	Sven-Bertil Taube

=== 2015 ===
Week	Date	Song title	Performer	Album title	Performer
1	1 January 2015	"Cheerleader (Felix Jaehn Remix Radio Edit)"	OMI	Rock or Bust	AC/DC
2	8 January 2015	"Take Me to Church"	Hozier	X	Ed Sheeran
3	15 January 2015	"Take Me to Church"	Hozier	X	Ed Sheeran
4	22 January 2015	"Take Me to Church"	Hozier	X	Ed Sheeran
5	29 January 2015	"Love Me Like You Do"	Ellie Goulding	X	Ed Sheeran
6	5 February 2015	"Love Me Like You Do"	Ellie Goulding	Shadows in the Night	Bob Dylan
7	12 February 2015	"Love Me Like You Do"	Ellie Goulding	Shadows in the Night	Bob Dylan
8	19 February 2015	"Love Me Like You Do"	Ellie Goulding	Den morronen	Thåström
9	26 February 2015	"Love Me Like You Do"	Ellie Goulding	In the Lonely Hour	Sam Smith
10	5 March 2015	"FourFiveSeconds"	Rihanna, Kanye West and Paul McCartney	In the Lonely Hour	Sam Smith
11	12 March 2015	"FourFiveSeconds"	Rihanna, Kanye West and Paul McCartney	In the Lonely Hour	Sam Smith
12	19 March 2015	"Heroes"	Måns Zelmerlöw	Goeksegh – Jag är fri	Jon Henrik Fjällgren
13	26 March 2015	"Heroes"	Måns Zelmerlöw	In the Lonely Hour	Sam Smith
14	2 April 2015	"Stole the Show"	Kygo feat. Parson James	In Tandem	Jill Johnson and Doug Seegers
15	9 April 2015	"Stole the Show"	Kygo feat. Parson James	In Tandem	Jill Johnson and Doug Seegers
16	16 April 2015	"See You Again"	Wiz Khalifa feat. Charlie Puth	In Tandem	Jill Johnson and Doug Seegers
17	23 April 2015	"See You Again"	Wiz Khalifa feat. Charlie Puth	Guld och gröna skogar	Hasse Andersson
18	30 April 2015	"See You Again"	Wiz Khalifa feat. Charlie Puth	Guld och gröna skogar	Hasse Andersson
19	7 May 2015	"See You Again"	Wiz Khalifa feat. Charlie Puth	Idag	Streaplers
20	18 May 2015	"See You Again"	Wiz Khalifa feat. Charlie Puth	In the Lonely Hour	Sam Smith
21	21 May 2015	"Are You with Me"	Lost Frequencies	X	Ed Sheeran
22	28 May 2015	"Det draaar"	Axel Wikner	På mitt sätt	Lasse Sigfridsson
23	8 June 2015	"Waiting for Love"	Avicii	Utekväll	Elisa's
24	11 June 2015	"Waiting for Love"	Avicii	Perfectly Damaged	Måns Zelmerlöw
25	18 June 2015	"Waiting for Love"	Avicii	Våra bästa!	Larz-Kristerz
26	25 June 2015	"Sun Is Shining"	Axwell Λ Ingrosso	Whiskey Barrel	Lasse Stefanz
27	2 July 2015	"Sun Is Shining"	Axwell Λ Ingrosso	Whiskey Barrel	Lasse Stefanz
28	13 July 2015	"Sun Is Shining"	Axwell Λ Ingrosso	Whiskey Barrel	Lasse Stefanz
29	17 July 2015	"Sun Is Shining"	Axwell Λ Ingrosso	Whiskey Barrel	Lasse Stefanz
30	24 July 2015	"Lush Life"	Zara Larsson	Whiskey Barrel	Lasse Stefanz
31	31 July 2015	"Lush Life"	Zara Larsson	Whiskey Barrel	Lasse Stefanz
32	7 August 2015	"Lush Life"	Zara Larsson	X	Ed Sheeran
33	14 August 2015	"Lush Life"	Zara Larsson	Whiskey Barrel	Lasse Stefanz
34	21 August 2015	"Lush Life"	Zara Larsson	Whiskey Barrel	Lasse Stefanz
35	28 August 2015	"Johnny G (The Guidetti Song)"	Badpojken	Meliora	Ghost
36	4 September 2015	"What Do You Mean?"	Justin Bieber	Meliora	Ghost
37	11 September 2015	"What Do You Mean?"	Justin Bieber	The Book of Souls	Iron Maiden
38	18 September 2015	"What Do You Mean?"	Justin Bieber	Beauty Behind the Madness	The Weeknd
39	25 September 2015	"Never Forget You"	Zara Larsson & MNEK	Rattle That Lock	David Gilmour
40	2 October 2015	"What Do You Mean?"	Justin Bieber	Fjärilar i magen	Darin
41	9 October 2015	"What Do You Mean?"	Justin Bieber	Stories	Avicii
42	16 October 2015	"7 Years"	Lukas Graham	Stories	Avicii
43	23 October 2015	"7 Years"	Lukas Graham	Stories	Avicii
44	30 October 2015	"Sorry"	Justin Bieber	Redo att gå sönder	Bo Kaspers Orkester
45	6 November 2015	"Hello"	Adele	Stories	Avicii
46	13 November 2015	"Hello"	Adele	Stories	Avicii
47	20 November 2015	"Love Yourself"	Justin Bieber	Purpose	Justin Bieber
48	27 November 2015	"Love Yourself"	Justin Bieber	25	Adele
49	4 December 2015	"Love Yourself"	Justin Bieber	25	Adele
50	11 December 2015	"Love Yourself"	Justin Bieber	25	Adele
51	18 December 2015	"Love Yourself"	Justin Bieber	25	Adele
52	25 December 2015	"Faded"	Alan Walker	25	Adele

=== 2016 ===
Week	Date	Song title	Performer	Album title	Performer
53	1 January 2016	"Faded"	Alan Walker	Purpose	Justin Bieber
1	8 January 2016	"Faded"	Alan Walker	Purpose	Justin Bieber
2	15 January 2016	"Faded"	Alan Walker	Blackstar	David Bowie
3	22 January 2016	"Faded"	Alan Walker	Purpose	Justin Bieber
4	29 January 2016	"Faded"	Alan Walker	Blackstar	David Bowie
5	5 February 2016	"Faded"	Alan Walker	Purpose	Justin Bieber
6	12 February 2016	"Pillowtalk"	Zayn	Purpose	Justin Bieber
7	19 February 2016	"Bada nakna"	Samir & Viktor	Purpose	Justin Bieber
8	26 February 2016	"Faded"	Alan Walker	Purpose	Justin Bieber
9	4 March 2016	"If I Were Sorry"	Frans	Purpose	Justin Bieber
10	11 March 2016	"If I Were Sorry"	Frans	Purpose	Justin Bieber
11	18 March 2016	"If I Were Sorry"	Frans	Tomorrow Became Today	Weeping Willows
12	25 March 2016	"If I Were Sorry"	Frans	Purpose	Justin Bieber
13	1 April 2016	"If I Were Sorry"	Frans	Mind of Mine	Zayn
14	8 April 2016	"Cheap Thrills"	Sia featuring Sean Paul	Purpose	Justin Bieber
15	15 April 2016	"Cheap Thrills"	Sia featuring Sean Paul	Purpose	Justin Bieber
16	22 April 2016	"Cheap Thrills"	Sia featuring Sean Paul	Purpose	Justin Bieber
17	29 April 2016	"One Dance"	Drake featuring Wizkid and Kyla	A Perfect World	Takida
18	6 May 2016	"One Dance"	Drake featuring Wizkid and Kyla	Lemonade	Beyoncé
19	13 May 2016	"One Dance"	Drake featuring Wizkid and Kyla	Den första är alltid gratis	Veronica Maggio
20	20 May 2016	"Can't Stop the Feeling!"	Justin Timberlake	Den första är alltid gratis	Veronica Maggio
21	27 May 2016	"Can't Stop the Feeling!"	Justin Timberlake	Då som nu för alltid	Kent
22	3 June 2016	"Can't Stop the Feeling!"	Justin Timberlake	Då som nu för alltid	Kent
23	10 June 2016	"Can't Stop the Feeling!"	Justin Timberlake	Seal the Deal & Let's Boogie	Volbeat
24	17 June 2016	"The Ocean"	Mike Perry featuring Shy Martin	Då som nu för alltid	Kent
25	24 June 2016	"The Ocean"	Mike Perry featuring Shy Martin	Granit och morän	Lars Winnerbäck
26	1 July 2016	"The Ocean"	Mike Perry featuring Shy Martin	Road Trip	Lasse Stefanz
27	8 July 2016	"The Ocean"	Mike Perry featuring Shy Martin	Road Trip	Lasse Stefanz
28	15 July 2016	"The Ocean"	Mike Perry featuring Shy Martin	Road Trip	Lasse Stefanz
29	22 July 2016	"The Ocean"	Mike Perry featuring Shy Martin	Road Trip	Lasse Stefanz
30	29 July 2016	"Cold Water"	Major Lazer featuring Justin Bieber and MØ	Road Trip	Lasse Stefanz
31	5 August 2016	"Cold Water"	Major Lazer featuring Justin Bieber and MØ	Road Trip	Lasse Stefanz
32	12 August 2016	"Cold Water"	Major Lazer featuring Justin Bieber and MØ	Road Trip	Lasse Stefanz
33	19 August 2016	"Cold Water"	Major Lazer featuring Justin Bieber and MØ	Road Trip	Lasse Stefanz
34	26 August 2016	"Cold Water"	Major Lazer featuring Justin Bieber and MØ	The Last Stand	Sabaton
35	2 September 2016	"Cold Water"	Major Lazer featuring Justin Bieber and MØ	Du gamla du fria	Håkan Hellström
36	9 September 2016	"Ain't My Fault"	Zara Larsson	Du gamla du fria	Håkan Hellström
37	16 September 2016	"Closer"	The Chainsmokers featuring Halsey	Du gamla du fria	Håkan Hellström
38	23 September 2016	"Closer"	The Chainsmokers featuring Halsey	Best Of	Kent
39	30 September 2016	"Closer"	The Chainsmokers featuring Halsey	Illuminate	Shawn Mendes
40	7 October 2016	"Starboy"	The Weeknd featuring Daft Punk	Rätt å slätt	Larz-Kristerz
41	14 October 2016	"Starboy"	The Weeknd featuring Daft Punk	Illuminate	Shawn Mendes
42	21 October 2016	"Starboy"	The Weeknd featuring Daft Punk	Illuminate	Shawn Mendes
43	28 October 2016	"Say You Won't Let Go"	James Arthur	You Want It Darker	Leonard Cohen
44	4 November 2016	"Say You Won't Let Go"	James Arthur	Lady Wood	Tove Lo
45	11 November 2016	"Say You Won't Let Go"	James Arthur	Together	Marcus & Martinus
46	18 November 2016	"Say You Won't Let Go"	James Arthur	You Want It Darker	Leonard Cohen
47	25 November 2016	"Call on Me"	Starley	Hardwired... to Self-Destruct	Metallica
48	2 December 2016	"Call on Me"	Starley	Starboy	The Weeknd
49	9 December 2016	"Call on Me"	Starley	Blue & Lonesome	The Rolling Stones
50	16 December 2016	"Call on Me"	Starley	Starboy	The Weeknd
51	23 December 2016	"Rockabye"	Clean Bandit featuring Sean Paul and Anne-Marie	Blue & Lonesome	The Rolling Stones
52	30 December 2016	"I Don't Wanna Live Forever"	Zayn and Taylor Swift	Blue & Lonesome	The Rolling Stones

=== 2017 ===
Week	Date	Song title	Performer	Album title	Performer
1	9 January 2017	"Rockabye"	Clean Bandit featuring Sean Paul and Anne-Marie	Tolkningarna – Så mycket bättre säsong 7	Danny Saucedo
2	13 January 2017	"Shape of You"	Ed Sheeran	50th Anniversary (1967–2017)	Lasse Stefanz
3	20 January 2017	"Shape of You"	Ed Sheeran	50th Anniversary (1967–2017)	Lasse Stefanz
4	27 January 2017	"Shape of You"	Ed Sheeran	Allting låter som Slipknot	Stiftelsen
5	3 February 2017	"Shape of You"	Ed Sheeran	Starboy	The Weeknd
6	10 February 2017	"Shape of You"	Ed Sheeran	Den långa vägen hem	Magnus Carlson
7	17 February 2017	"Shape of You"	Ed Sheeran	Den långa vägen hem	Magnus Carlson
8	24 February 2017	"All I Need"	Joakim Lundell featuring Arrhult	Starboy	The Weeknd
9	3 March 2017	"Shape of You"	Ed Sheeran	Starboy	The Weeknd
10	10 March 2017	"Shape of You"	Ed Sheeran	÷	Ed Sheeran
11	17 March 2017	"Shape of You"	Ed Sheeran	÷	Ed Sheeran
12	24 March 2017	"Shape of You"	Ed Sheeran	So Good	Zara Larsson
13	31 March 2017	"Symphony"	Clean Bandit featuring Zara Larsson	÷	Ed Sheeran
14	7 April 2017	"Shape of You"	Ed Sheeran	÷	Ed Sheeran
15	14 April 2017	"Shape of You"	Ed Sheeran	÷	Ed Sheeran
16	21 April 2017	"Shape of You"	Ed Sheeran	÷	Ed Sheeran
17	28 April 2017	"Despacito" (Remix)	Luis Fonsi and Daddy Yankee featuring Justin Bieber	÷	Ed Sheeran
18	5 May 2017	"Despacito" (Remix)	Luis Fonsi and Daddy Yankee featuring Justin Bieber	En vacker natt	Per Gessle
19	12 May 2017	"Despacito" (Remix)	Luis Fonsi and Daddy Yankee featuring Justin Bieber	Hov1	Hov1
20	19 May 2017	"Despacito" (Remix)	Luis Fonsi and Daddy Yankee featuring Justin Bieber	Hov1	Hov1
21	26 May 2017	"Despacito" (Remix)	Luis Fonsi and Daddy Yankee featuring Justin Bieber	Hov1	Hov1
22	2 June 2017	"Despacito" (Remix)	Luis Fonsi and Daddy Yankee featuring Justin Bieber	Hov1	Hov1
23	9 June 2017	"Despacito" (Remix)	Luis Fonsi and Daddy Yankee featuring Justin Bieber	Hov1	Hov1
24	16 June 2017	"Despacito" (Remix)	Luis Fonsi and Daddy Yankee featuring Justin Bieber	Vi var där	Lars Winnerbäck
25	23 June 2017	"Despacito" (Remix)	Luis Fonsi and Daddy Yankee featuring Justin Bieber	Hov1	Hov1
26	30 June 2017	"Despacito" (Remix)	Luis Fonsi and Daddy Yankee featuring Justin Bieber	Wind Me Up	Lasse Stefanz
27	7 July 2017	"Despacito" (Remix)	Luis Fonsi and Daddy Yankee featuring Justin Bieber	Wind Me Up	Lasse Stefanz
28	14 July 2017	"Despacito" (Remix)	Luis Fonsi and Daddy Yankee featuring Justin Bieber	Wind Me Up	Lasse Stefanz
29	21 July 2017	"Despacito" (Remix)	Luis Fonsi and Daddy Yankee featuring Justin Bieber	Wind Me Up	Lasse Stefanz
30	28 July 2017	"Despacito" (Remix)	Luis Fonsi and Daddy Yankee featuring Justin Bieber	Lust for Life	Lana Del Rey
31	4 August 2017	"Despacito" (Remix)	Luis Fonsi and Daddy Yankee featuring Justin Bieber	Hov1	Hov1
32	11 August 2017	"Despacito" (Remix)	Luis Fonsi and Daddy Yankee featuring Justin Bieber	Hov1	Hov1
33	18 August 2017	"Without You"	Avicii featuring Sandro Cavazza	Avīci (01)	Avicii
34	25 August 2017	"Without You"	Avicii featuring Sandro Cavazza	Avīci (01)	Avicii
35	1 September 2017	"Without You"	Avicii featuring Sandro Cavazza	Avīci (01)	Avicii
36	8 September 2017	"Without You"	Avicii featuring Sandro Cavazza	Avīci (01)	Avicii
37	15 September 2017	"Without You"	Avicii featuring Sandro Cavazza	Avīci (01)	Avicii
38	22 September 2017	"Rockstar"	Post Malone featuring 21 Savage	Avīci (01)	Avicii
39	29 September 2017	"Rockstar"	Post Malone featuring 21 Savage	Avīci (01)	Avicii
40	6 October 2017	"Rockstar"	Post Malone featuring 21 Savage	Centralmassivet	Thåström
41	13 October 2017	"Rockstar"	Post Malone featuring 21 Savage	Avīci (01)	Avicii
42	20 October 2017	"Rockstar"	Post Malone featuring 21 Savage	Piano	Benny Andersson
43	27 October 2017	"Rockstar"	Post Malone featuring 21 Savage	Avīci (01)	Avicii
44	3 November 2017	"Rockstar"	Post Malone featuring 21 Savage	Piano	Benny Andersson
45	10 November 2017	"Pari"	Hov1 featuring Jireel	The Thrill of It All	Sam Smith
46	17 November 2017	"Pari"	Hov1 featuring Jireel	The Thrill of It All	Sam Smith
47	24 November 2017	"Rockstar"	Post Malone featuring 21 Savage	Moments	Marcus & Martinus
48	1 December 2017	"Rockstar"	Post Malone featuring 21 Savage	Tvillingen	Darin
49	8 December 2017	"Perfect Duet"	Ed Sheeran and Beyoncé	Country Winter Party	Lasse Stefanz
50	15 December 2017	"Perfect Duet"	Ed Sheeran and Beyoncé	Piano	Benny Andersson
51	22 December 2017	"River"	Eminem featuring Ed Sheeran	Piano	Benny Andersson
52	29 December 2017	"Last Christmas"	Wham!	Country Winter Party	Lasse Stefanz

=== 2018 ===
Week	Date	Song title	Performer	Album title	Performer
1	5 January 2018	"Perfect Duet"	Ed Sheeran and Beyoncé	÷	Ed Sheeran
2	12 January 2018	"Perfect Duet"	Ed Sheeran and Beyoncé	÷	Ed Sheeran
3	19 January 2018	"Perfect Duet"	Ed Sheeran and Beyoncé	÷	Ed Sheeran
4	26 January 2018	"Perfect Duet"	Ed Sheeran and Beyoncé	Ruins	First Aid Kit
5	2 February 2018	"God's Plan"	Drake	Ruins	First Aid Kit
6	9 February 2018	"God's Plan"	Drake	Ruins	First Aid Kit
7	16 February 2018	"God's Plan"	Drake	Love in the Milky Way	Sarah Klang
8	23 February 2018	"God's Plan"	Drake	Love in the Milky Way	Sarah Klang
9	2 March 2018	"Psycho"	Post Malone featuring Ty Dolla Sign	÷	Ed Sheeran
10	9 March 2018	"Every Single Day"	Felix Sandman	Min penna blöder	Z.E
11	16 March 2018	"Every Single Day"	Felix Sandman	Firepower	Judas Priest
12	23 March 2018	"Every Single Day"	Felix Sandman	?	XXXTentacion
13	29 March 2018	"Every Single Day"	Felix Sandman	?	XXXTentacion
14	6 April 2018	"Hon dansar vidare i livet"	Hov1	My Dear Melancholy,	The Weeknd
15	13 April 2018	"Hon dansar vidare i livet"	Hov1	Gudarna på Västerbron	Hov1
16	20 April 2018	"Hon dansar vidare i livet"	Hov1	Gudarna på Västerbron	Hov1
17	27 April 2018	"Without You"	Avicii featuring Sandro Cavazza	Avīci (01)	Avicii
18	4 May 2018	"Without You"	Avicii featuring Sandro Cavazza	Beerbongs & Bentleys	Post Malone
19	11 May 2018	"Better Now"	Post Malone	Beerbongs & Bentleys	Post Malone
20	18 May 2018	"Better Now"	Post Malone	Beerbongs & Bentleys	Post Malone
21	25 May 2018	"Mer för varandra"	Norlie & KKV and Estrad	Beerbongs & Bentleys	Post Malone
22	1 June 2018	"Mer för varandra"	Norlie & KKV and Estrad	Peace	Graveyard
23	8 June 2018	"Mer för varandra"	Norlie & KKV and Estrad	Prequelle	Ghost
24	15 June 2018	"Mer för varandra"	Norlie & KKV and Estrad	Gudarna på Västerbron	Hov1
25	21 June 2018	"Mer för varandra"	Norlie & KKV and Estrad	Gudarna på Västerbron	Hov1
26	29 June 2018	"Mer för varandra"	Norlie & KKV and Estrad	?	XXXTentacion
27	6 July 2018	"Don't Matter to Me"	Drake featuring Michael Jackson	Forever	Lasse Stefanz
28	13 July 2018	"Don't Matter to Me"	Drake featuring Michael Jackson	Forever	Lasse Stefanz
29	20 July 2018	"In My Feelings"	Drake	Scorpion	Drake
30	27 July 2018	"Still" (Recorded at Spotify Studios)	Hov1	Gudarna på Västerbron	Hov1
31	3 August 2018	"In My Feelings"	Drake	Gudarna på Västerbron	Hov1
32	10 August 2018	"In My Mind"	Dynoro and Gigi D'Agostino	Astroworld	Travis Scott
33	17 August 2018	"In My Mind"	Dynoro and Gigi D'Agostino	Gudarna på Västerbron	Hov1
34	24 August 2018	"In My Mind"	Dynoro and Gigi D'Agostino	Sweetener	Ariana Grande
35	31 August 2018	"Auf wiedersehen"	Hov1	Gudarna på Västerbron	Hov1
36	7 September 2018	"In My Mind"	Dynoro and Gigi D'Agostino	Kamikaze	Eminem
37	14 September 2018	"In My Mind"	Dynoro and Gigi D'Agostino	Kamikaze	Eminem
38	21 September 2018	"I Love It"	Kanye West and Lil Pump	Kamikaze	Eminem
39	28 September 2018	"Falling Down"	Lil Peep and XXXTentacion	Kamikaze	Eminem
40	5 October 2018	"Sweet but Psycho"	Ava Max	Identification	Benjamin Ingrosso
41	12 October 2018	"Sweet but Psycho"	Ava Max	Identification	Benjamin Ingrosso
42	19 October 2018	"Sweet but Psycho"	Ava Max	Identification	Benjamin Ingrosso
43	26 October 2018	"Sweet but Psycho"	Ava Max	Gudarna på Västerbron	Hov1
44	2 November 2018	"Shallow"	Lady Gaga and Bradley Cooper	Honey	Robyn
45	9 November 2018	"Shallow"	Lady Gaga and Bradley Cooper	Honey	Robyn
46	16 November 2018	"Shallow"	Lady Gaga and Bradley Cooper	The Beatles	The Beatles
47	23 November 2018	"Shallow"	Lady Gaga and Bradley Cooper	Delta	Mumford & Sons
48	30 November 2018	"Shallow"	Lady Gaga and Bradley Cooper	Sverige vet	Z.E
49	7 December 2018	"All I Want for Christmas Is You"	Mariah Carey	Sverige vet	Z.E
50	14 December 2018	"All I Want for Christmas Is You"	Mariah Carey	Skins	XXXTentacion
51	21 December 2018	"All I Want for Christmas Is You"	Mariah Carey	Illusioner	Håkan Hellström
52	28 December 2018	"Last Christmas"	Wham!	Christmas	Michael Bublé

=== 2019 ===
Week	Date	Song title	Performer	Album title	Performer
1	4 January 2019	"Shallow"	Lady Gaga and Bradley Cooper	Sverige vet	Z.E
2	11 January 2019	"Shallow"	Lady Gaga and Bradley Cooper	Wow	Ant Wan
3	18 January 2019	"Shallow"	Lady Gaga and Bradley Cooper	Wow	Ant Wan
4	25 January 2019	"7 Rings"	Ariana Grande	Wow	Ant Wan
5	1 February 2019	"7 Rings"	Ariana Grande	Wow	Ant Wan
6	8 February 2019	"Bury a Friend"	Billie Eilish	Wow	Ant Wan
7	15 February 2019	"Katten i trakten"	Einár	Thank U, Next	Ariana Grande
8	22 February 2019	"Katten i trakten"	Einár	Thank U, Next	Ariana Grande
9	1 March 2019	"Katten i trakten"	Einár	Thank U, Next	Ariana Grande
10	8 March 2019	"Too Late for Love"	John Lundvik	I, the Mask	In Flames
11	15 March 2019	"Too Late for Love"	John Lundvik	Thank U, Next	Ariana Grande
12	22 March 2019	"Too Late for Love"	John Lundvik	Sunnanvind	Mares
13	29 March 2019	"Too Late for Love"	John Lundvik	After Us	Weeping Willows
14	5 April 2019	"Vindar på Mars"	Hov1	When We All Fall Asleep, Where Do We Go?	Billie Eilish
15	12 April 2019	"SOS"	Avicii featuring Aloe Blacc	When We All Fall Asleep, Where Do We Go?	Billie Eilish
16	19 April 2019	"SOS"	Avicii featuring Aloe Blacc	When We All Fall Asleep, Where Do We Go?	Billie Eilish
17	26 April 2019	"SOS"	Avicii featuring Aloe Blacc	When We All Fall Asleep, Where Do We Go?	Billie Eilish
18	3 May 2019	"SOS"	Avicii featuring Aloe Blacc	When We All Fall Asleep, Where Do We Go?	Billie Eilish
19	10 May 2019	"SOS"	Avicii featuring Aloe Blacc	When We All Fall Asleep, Where Do We Go?	Billie Eilish
20	17 May 2019	"I Don't Care"	Ed Sheeran and Justin Bieber	When We All Fall Asleep, Where Do We Go?	Billie Eilish
21	24 May 2019	"Hornstullsstrand"	Hov1 and Veronica Maggio	Vindar på Mars	Hov1
22	31 May 2019	"I Don't Care"	Ed Sheeran and Justin Bieber	Vindar på Mars	Hov1
23	7 June 2019	"I Don't Care"	Ed Sheeran and Justin Bieber	Vindar på Mars	Hov1
24	14 June 2019	"Första klass"	Einár	Tim	Avicii
25	21 June 2019	"Första klass"	Einár	Första klass	Einár
26	28 June 2019	"I Don't Care"	Ed Sheeran and Justin Bieber	Första klass	Einár
27	5 July 2019	"Señorita"	Shawn Mendes and Camila Cabello	Första klass	Einár
28	12 July 2019	"Señorita"	Shawn Mendes and Camila Cabello	Night Flight	Lasse Stefanz
29	19 July 2019	"Señorita"	Shawn Mendes and Camila Cabello	No.6 Collaborations Project	Ed Sheeran
30	26 July 2019	"Señorita"	Shawn Mendes and Camila Cabello	The Great War	Sabaton
31	2 August 2019	"Señorita"	Shawn Mendes and Camila Cabello	Vindar på Mars	Hov1
32	9 August 2019	"Dance Monkey"	Tones and I	Första klass	Einár
33	16 August 2019	"Dance Monkey"	Tones and I	Tim	Avicii
34	23 August 2019	"Dance Monkey"	Tones and I	Första klass	Einár
35	30 August 2019	"Nu vi skiner"	Einár	Lover	Taylor Swift
36	6 September 2019	"Dance Monkey"	Tones and I	Flawless	Dree Low
37	13 September 2019	"Pippi"	Dree Low	Nummer 1	Einár
38	20 September 2019	"Pippi"	Dree Low	Nummer 1	Einár
39	27 September 2019	"Pippi"	Dree Low	Flawless	Dree Low
40	4 October 2019	"Pippi"	Dree Low	Eldtuppen	Lars Winnerbäck
41	11 October 2019	"Pippi"	Dree Low	Flawless	Dree Low
42	18 October 2019	"Dance Monkey"	Tones and I	Prequelle Exalted	Ghost
43	25 October 2019	"Dance Monkey"	Tones and I	Flawless	Dree Low
44	1 November 2019	"Dance Monkey"	Tones and I	Fiender är tråkigt	Veronica Maggio
45	8 November 2019	"Dance Monkey"	Tones and I	Flawless	Dree Low
46	15 November 2019	"Lev nu dö sen"	Miss Li	Flawless	Dree Low
47	22 November 2019	"Lev nu dö sen"	Miss Li	Flawless	Dree Low
48	29 November 2019	"Lev nu dö sen"	Miss Li	Kapitel 21	Ant Wan
49	6 December 2019	"Lev nu dö sen"	Miss Li	1 år	1.Cuz
50	13 December 2019	"Dance Monkey"	Tones and I	Flawless	Dree Low
51	20 December 2019	"XO"	Yasin and Dree Low	Fine Line	Harry Styles
52	27 December 2019	"Last Christmas"	Wham!	Christmas	Michael Bublé

=== 2020 ===
Week	Date	Song title	Performer	Album title	Performer
1	3 January 2020	"XO"	Yasin and Dree Low	Handen under Mona Lisas kjol (Pt:1)	Yasin
2	10 January 2020	"Blinding Lights"	The Weeknd	Handen under Mona Lisas kjol (Pt:1)	Yasin
3	17 January 2020	"Mitten av september"	Hov1	Montague	Hov1
4	24 January 2020	"Svag"	Victor Leksell	Montague	Hov1
5	31 January 2020	"Svag"	Victor Leksell	Montague	Hov1
6	7 February 2020	"Svag"	Victor Leksell	Montague	Hov1
7	14 February 2020	"Svag"	Victor Leksell	Montague	Hov1
8	21 February 2020	"Svag"	Victor Leksell	Changes	Justin Bieber
9	28 February 2020	"Svag"	Victor Leksell	Ordinary Man	Ozzy Osbourne
10	6 March 2020	"Svag"	Victor Leksell	BLodigt	Asme
11	13 March 2020	"Move"	The Mamas	Flawless 2	Dree Low
12	20 March 2020	"Svag"	Victor Leksell	Flawless 2	Dree Low
13	27 March 2020	"Blinding Lights"	The Weeknd	After Hours	The Weeknd
14	3 April 2020	"Blinding Lights"	The Weeknd	After Hours	The Weeknd
15	10 April 2020	"Blinding Lights"	The Weeknd	After Hours	The Weeknd
16	17 April 2020	"Blinding Lights"	The Weeknd	After Hours	The Weeknd
17	24 April 2020	"Blinding Lights"	The Weeknd	After Hours	The Weeknd
18	1 May 2020	"Blinding Lights"	The Weeknd	After Hours	The Weeknd
19	8 May 2020	"Svag"	Victor Leksell	After Hours	The Weeknd
20	15 May 2020	"Blinding Lights"	The Weeknd	After Hours	The Weeknd
21	22 May 2020	"Blinding Lights"	The Weeknd	Rampljus Vol. 1	Håkan Hellström
22	29 May 2020	"Blinding Lights"	The Weeknd	98.01.11	Yasin
23	5 June 2020	"Svag"	Victor Leksell	98.01.11	Yasin
24	12 June 2020	"Svag"	Victor Leksell	98.01.11	Yasin
25	18 June 2020	"Svag"	Victor Leksell	98.01.11	Yasin
26	26 June 2020	"Svag"	Victor Leksell	Fånga mig när jag faller	Victor Leksell
27	3 July 2020	"Savage Love (Laxed – Siren Beat)"	Jawsh 685 and Jason Derulo	Fånga mig när jag faller	Victor Leksell
28	10 July 2020	"Savage Love (Laxed – Siren Beat)"	Jawsh 685 and Jason Derulo	Fånga mig när jag faller	Victor Leksell
29	17 July 2020	"Savage Love (Laxed – Siren Beat)"	Jawsh 685 and Jason Derulo	Fånga mig när jag faller	Victor Leksell
30	24 July 2020	"Savage Love (Laxed – Siren Beat)"	Jawsh 685 and Jason Derulo	Fånga mig när jag faller	Victor Leksell
31	31 July 2020	"Savage Love (Laxed – Siren Beat)"	Jawsh 685 and Jason Derulo	Fånga mig när jag faller	Victor Leksell
32	7 August 2020	"Savage Love (Laxed – Siren Beat)"	Jawsh 685 and Jason Derulo	Fånga mig när jag faller	Victor Leksell
33	14 August 2020	"Savage Love (Laxed – Siren Beat)"	Jawsh 685 and Jason Derulo	Fånga mig när jag faller	Victor Leksell
34	21 August 2020	"Savage Love (Laxed – Siren Beat)"	Jawsh 685 and Jason Derulo	Fånga mig när jag faller	Victor Leksell
35	28 August 2020	"Svag"	Victor Leksell	Fånga mig när jag faller	Victor Leksell
36	4 September 2020	"Mood"	24kGoldn featuring Iann Dior	Fånga mig när jag faller	Victor Leksell
37	11 September 2020	"Mood"	24kGoldn featuring Iann Dior	Fånga mig när jag faller	Victor Leksell
38	18 September 2020	"Mood"	24kGoldn featuring Iann Dior	Fånga mig när jag faller	Victor Leksell
39	25 September 2020	"Mood"	24kGoldn featuring Iann Dior	Fånga mig när jag faller	Victor Leksell
40	2 October 2020	"Mood"	24kGoldn featuring Iann Dior	Fånga mig när jag faller	Victor Leksell
41	9 October 2020	"Mood"	24kGoldn featuring Iann Dior	Unge med extra energi	Einár
42	16 October 2020	"Mood"	24kGoldn featuring Iann Dior	More to Life	Yasin
43	23 October 2020	"Mood"	24kGoldn featuring Iann Dior	Fånga mig när jag faller	Victor Leksell
44	30 October 2020	"Mood"	24kGoldn featuring Iann Dior	Letter to You	Bruce Springsteen
45	6 November 2020	"Långsamt farväl"	Benjamin Ingrosso	Fånga mig när jag faller	Victor Leksell
46	13 November 2020	"Mood"	24kGoldn featuring Iann Dior	Gammal kärlek rostar aldrig	Per Gessle
47	20 November 2020	"Ge upp igen"	Miriam Bryant and Yasin	Power Up	AC/DC
48	27 November 2020	"Ge upp igen"	Miriam Bryant and Yasin	Fånga mig när jag faller	Victor Leksell
49	4 December 2020	"Ge upp igen"	Miriam Bryant and Yasin	Telegram	Ulf Lundell
50	11 December 2020	"Ge upp igen"	Miriam Bryant and Yasin	Fånga mig när jag faller	Victor Leksell
51	18 December 2020	"Du måste finnas"	Newkid	Fånga mig när jag faller	Victor Leksell
52	25 December 2020	"All I Want for Christmas Is You"	Mariah Carey	Christmas	Michael Bublé
53	1 January 2021	"Du måste finnas"	Newkid	Fånga mig när jag faller	Victor Leksell

=== 2021 ===
Week	Date	Song title	Performer	Album title	Performer
1	8 January 2021	"Du måste finnas"	Newkid	Fånga mig när jag faller	Victor Leksell
2	15 January 2021	"Du måste finnas"	Newkid	Äntligen borta	Jakob Hellman
3	22 January 2021	"Drivers License"	Olivia Rodrigo	En gång i tiden	Benjamin Ingrosso
4	29 January 2021	"Drivers License"	Olivia Rodrigo	Fånga mig när jag faller	Victor Leksell
5	5 February 2021	"Barn av vår tid"	Hov1	Fånga mig när jag faller	Victor Leksell
6	12 February 2021	"Barn av vår tid"	Hov1	Fånga mig när jag faller	Victor Leksell
7	19 February 2021	"Tystnar i luren"	Miriam Bryant and Victor Leksell	Fånga mig när jag faller	Victor Leksell
8	26 February 2021	"Tystnar i luren"	Miriam Bryant and Victor Leksell	Fånga mig när jag faller	Victor Leksell
9	5 March 2021	"Tystnar i luren"	Miriam Bryant and Victor Leksell	Leylas World	Ant Wan
10	12 March 2021	"Gamora"	Hov1 featuring Einár	Leylas World	Ant Wan
11	19 March 2021	"Voices"	Tusse	Leylas World	Ant Wan
12	26 March 2021	"Voices"	Tusse	Justice	Justin Bieber
13	2 April 2021	"Gamora"	Hov1 featuring Einár	Priceless	Dree Low
14	9 April 2021	"Gamora"	Hov1 featuring Einár	Priceless	Dree Low
15	16 April 2021	"Gamora"	Hov1 featuring Einár	Alla dar i veckan	Donnez
16	23 April 2021	"Gamora"	Hov1 featuring Einár	En gång i tiden (del 2)	Benjamin Ingrosso
17	30 April 2021	"Gamora"	Hov1 featuring Einár	En gång i tiden (del 2)	Benjamin Ingrosso
18	7 May 2021	"Tystnar i luren"	Miriam Bryant and Victor Leksell	Tusen flows	Asme
19	14 May 2021	"Tokken"	Hov1 featuring Dree Low	Dom ska veta	Molly Sandén
20	21 May 2021	"Tokken"	Hov1 featuring Dree Low	Dom ska veta	Molly Sandén
21	28 May 2021	"Zitti e buoni"	Måneskin	Sour	Olivia Rodrigo
22	4 June 2021	"Samma gamla vanliga"	A36	Sour	Olivia Rodrigo
23	11 June 2021	"Samma gamla vanliga"	A36	Sour	Olivia Rodrigo
24	18 June 2021	"Samma gamla vanliga"	A36	Sour	Olivia Rodrigo
25	25 June 2021	"Samma gamla vanliga"	A36	Teatro d'ira: Vol. I	Måneskin
26	2 July 2021	"Samma gamla vanliga"	A36	Sour	Olivia Rodrigo
27	9 July 2021	"Samma gamla vanliga"	A36	Sour	Olivia Rodrigo
28	16 July 2021	"Stay"	The Kid Laroi and Justin Bieber	Sour	Olivia Rodrigo
29	23 July 2021	"Flickorna i Båstad"	Hov1	Sour	Olivia Rodrigo
30	30 July 2021	"Stay"	The Kid Laroi and Justin Bieber	Sour	Olivia Rodrigo
31	6 August 2021	"Stay"	The Kid Laroi and Justin Bieber	Happier Than Ever	Billie Eilish
32	13 August 2021	"Stay"	The Kid Laroi and Justin Bieber	Sour	Olivia Rodrigo
33	20 August 2021	"Stay"	The Kid Laroi and Justin Bieber	Sour	Olivia Rodrigo
34	27 August 2021	"Stay"	The Kid Laroi and Justin Bieber	Sour	Olivia Rodrigo
35	3 September 2021	"Stay"	The Kid Laroi and Justin Bieber	Donda	Kanye West
36	10 September 2021	"Don't Shut Me Down"	ABBA	Senjutsu	Iron Maiden
37	17 September 2021	"Stay"	The Kid Laroi and Justin Bieber	Certified Lover Boy	Drake
38	24 September 2021	"Stay"	The Kid Laroi and Justin Bieber	Montero	Lil Nas X
39	1 October 2021	"Stay"	The Kid Laroi and Justin Bieber	Underbart i all misär	Miss Li
40	8 October 2021	"Räkna dagar"	Hov1	Barn av vår tid	Hov1
41	15 October 2021	"Shivers"	Ed Sheeran	Barn av vår tid	Hov1
42	22 October 2021	"Easy on Me"	Adele	Wow 2	Ant Wan
43	29 October 2021	"Dansa"	Einár and Adaam	Unge med extra energi	Einár
44	5 November 2021	"Easy on Me"	Adele	=	Ed Sheeran
45	12 November 2021	"Easy on Me"	Adele	Voyage	ABBA
46	19 November 2021	"Easy on Me"	Adele	Voyage	ABBA
47	26 November 2021	"Easy on Me"	Adele	30	Adele
48	3 December 2021	"All I Want for Christmas Is You"	Mariah Carey	Voyage	ABBA
49	10 December 2021	"All I Want for Christmas Is You"	Mariah Carey	Voyage	ABBA
50	17 December 2021	"All I Want for Christmas Is You"	Mariah Carey	Voyage	ABBA
51	24 December 2021	"Last Christmas"	Wham!	Voyage	ABBA
52	31 December 2021	"Last Christmas"	Wham!	Voyage	ABBA

=== 2022 ===
Week	Date	Song title	Performer	Album title	Performer
1	7 January 2022	"ABCDEFU"	Gayle	30	Adele
2	14 January 2022	"Som dom"	Sarettii	Dawn FM	The Weeknd
3	21 January 2022	"Som dom"	Sarettii	30	Adele
4	28 January 2022	"30 personer"	Hov1 and Elias Hurtig	Vi	Newkid
5	4 February 2022	"Länge leve vi"	23	Vi	Newkid
6	11 February 2022	"Länge leve vi"	23	Myror i brallan	Adaam
7	18 February 2022	"Länge leve vi"	23	Vi	Newkid
8	25 February 2022	"Mano"	Jireel	Vi	Newkid
9	4 March 2022	"Mano"	Jireel	Musik eller metall	Owen
10	11 March 2022	"Run to the Hills"	Klara Hammarström	The War to End All Wars	Sabaton
11	18 March 2022	"Hold Me Closer"	Cornelia Jakobs	Impera	Ghost
12	25 March 2022	"Hold Me Closer"	Cornelia Jakobs	Impera	Ghost
13	1 April 2022	"Hold Me Closer"	Cornelia Jakobs	Vatten	Laleh
14	8 April 2022	"As It Was"	Harry Styles	Eyes of Oblivion	The Hellacopters
15	15 April 2022	"Ut med allt"	Björn Holmgren	Eyes of Oblivion	The Hellacopters
16	22 April 2022	"Fakka ur"	Loam and Adaam	Satan i gatan	Veronica Maggio
17	29 April 2022	"Fakka ur"	Loam and Adaam	Satan i gatan	Veronica Maggio
18	6 May 2022	"Fakka ur"	Loam and Adaam	Zeit	Rammstein
19	13 May 2022	"Matador"	Sarettii	X	Loam
20	20 May 2022	"2step"	Ed Sheeran featuring 1.Cuz	Mr. Morale & the Big Steppers	Kendrick Lamar
21	27 May 2022	"Komplicerat"	Ant Wan	Harry's House	Harry Styles
22	3 June 2022	"2step"	Ed Sheeran featuring 1.Cuz	Jag fortsätter glömma	Joakim Berg
23	10 June 2022	"Running Up That Hill (A Deal with God)"	Kate Bush	Harry's House	Harry Styles
24	17 June 2022	"Lilla Nisse"	Einár	Inloggad 2	Haval and Manny Flaco
25	24 June 2022	"Missförstått"	Bell	Inloggad 2	Haval and Manny Flaco
26	1 July 2022	"Kan inte gå"	Bolaget	Evergreen	Lasse Stefanz
27	8 July 2022	"Kan inte gå"	Bolaget	Evergreen	Lasse Stefanz
28	15 July 2022	"Kan inte gå"	Bolaget	Vapen & ammunition (20 år)	Kent
29	22 July 2022	"Kan inte gå"	Bolaget	Harry's House	Harry Styles
30	29 July 2022	"Din låt"	Victor Leksell and Einár	X	Loam
31	5 August 2022	"Din låt"	Victor Leksell and Einár	Renaissance	Beyoncé
32	12 August 2022	"Din låt"	Victor Leksell and Einár	X	Loam
33	19 August 2022	"Din låt"	Victor Leksell and Einár	Days of the Lost	The Halo Effect
34	26 August 2022	"Din låt"	Victor Leksell and Einár	Selfmade	23
35	3 September 2022	"Din låt"	Victor Leksell and Einár	Welcome My Last Chapter	Vinterland
36	9 September 2022	"Din låt"	Victor Leksell and Einár	The Only Wan	Ant Wan
37	16 September 2022	"Din låt"	Victor Leksell and Einár	The Only Wan	Ant Wan
38	23 September 2022	"Sevilla"	Thrife	The Only Wan	Ant Wan
39	30 September 2022	"I'm Good (Blue)"	David Guetta and Bebe Rexha	The Only Wan	Ant Wan
40	7 October 2022	"I'm Good (Blue)"	David Guetta and Bebe Rexha	The Only Wan	Ant Wan
41	14 October 2022	"I'm Good (Blue)"	David Guetta and Bebe Rexha	The Only Wan	Ant Wan
42	21 October 2022	"Dum"	Ant Wan	The Only Wan (Deluxe)	Ant Wan
43	28 October 2022	"I'm Good (Blue)"	David Guetta and Bebe Rexha	Midnights	Taylor Swift
44	4 November 2022	"Ingen annan rör mig som du"	Molly Hammar	Midnights	Taylor Swift
45	11 November 2022	"Ingen annan rör mig som du"	Molly Hammar	Midnights	Taylor Swift
46	18 November 2022	"Ingen annan rör mig som du"	Molly Hammar	Only the Strong Survive	Bruce Springsteen
47	25 November 2022	"Ingen annan rör mig som du"	Molly Hammar	Midnights	Taylor Swift
48	2 December 2022	"All I Want for Christmas Is You"	Mariah Carey	Midnights	Taylor Swift
49	9 December 2022	"All I Want for Christmas Is You"	Mariah Carey	Klart det ska bli jul	Arvingarna
50	16 December 2022	"All I Want for Christmas Is You"	Mariah Carey	Klart det ska bli jul	Arvingarna
51	23 December 2022	"Last Christmas"	Wham!	Så mycket bättre: Säsong 13	Various artists
52	30 December 2022	"Last Christmas"	Wham!	Klart det ska bli jul	Arvingarna

=== 2023 ===
Week	Date	Song title	Performer	Album title	Performer
1	6 January 2023	"Rid mig som en dalahäst"	Rasmus Gozzi and Fröken Snusk	Somna med Humlan Djojj	Humlan Djojj and Josefine Götestam
2	13 January 2023	"Nätterna i Göteborg"	Victor Leksell	M.O.B	23 and C.Gambino
3	20 January 2023	"Flowers"	Miley Cyrus	M.O.B	23 and C.Gambino
4	27 January 2023	"Flowers"	Miley Cyrus	M.O.B	23 and C.Gambino
5	3 February 2023	"Du & jag"	Einár	M.O.B	23 and C.Gambino
6	10 February 2023	"Du & jag"	Einár	Somna med Humlan Djojj	Humlan Djojj and Josefine Götestam
7	17 February 2023	"Flowers"	Miley Cyrus	Foregone	In Flames
8	24 February 2023	"Flowers"	Miley Cyrus	Somna med Humlan Djojj	Humlan Djojj and Josefine Götestam
9	3 March 2023	"Tattoo"	Loreen	Pistoler poesi och sex	Yasin
10	10 March 2023	"Tattoo"	Loreen	Pistoler poesi och sex	Yasin
11	17 March 2023	"Tattoo"	Loreen	Pistoler poesi och sex	Yasin
12	24 March 2023	"Tattoo"	Loreen	Pistoler poesi och sex	Yasin
13	31 March 2023	"Lilla B"	Hov1	Memento Mori	Depeche Mode
14	7 April 2023	"Lilla B"	Hov1	Pistoler poesi och sex	Yasin
15	14 April 2023	"Lilla B"	Hov1	Pistoler poesi och sex	Yasin
16	21 April 2023	"Ikväll igen"	Bolaget	72 Seasons	Metallica
17	28 April 2023	"Ikväll igen"	Bolaget	Pistoler poesi och sex	Yasin
18	5 May 2023	"Ikväll igen"	Bolaget	Poetiska försök	Håkan Hellström
19	12 May 2023	"Ikväll igen"	Bolaget	−	Ed Sheeran
20	19 May 2023	"Cha Cha Cha"	Käärijä	Pistoler poesi och sex	Yasin
21	26 May 2023	"Grät"	Hov1	Phantomime	Ghost
22	2 June 2023	"Grät"	Hov1	Pistoler poesi och sex	Yasin
23	9 June 2023	"Ikväll igen"	Bolaget	Satan i gatan	Veronica Maggio
24	16 June 2023	"Vill va med dig"	Einár	Satan i gatan	Veronica Maggio
25	23 June 2023	"Ikväll igen"	Bolaget	Satan i gatan	Veronica Maggio
26	30 June 2023	"Ikväll igen"	Bolaget	Satan i gatan	Veronica Maggio
27	7 July 2023	"Ikväll igen"	Bolaget	Hux Flux	Gyllene Tider
28	14 July 2023	"Ikväll igen"	Bolaget	Speak Now (Taylor's Version)	Taylor Swift
29	21 July 2023	"Ikväll igen"	Bolaget	Speak Now (Taylor's Version)	Taylor Swift
30	28 July 2023	"Ikväll igen"	Bolaget	Trapen till radion	Adaam
31	4 August 2023	"Ikväll igen"	Bolaget	Utopia	Travis Scott
32	11 August 2023	"Ikväll igen"	Bolaget	Somna med Humlan Djojj	Humlan Djojj and Josefine Götestam
33	18 August 2023	"Ikväll igen"	Bolaget	The Death of Randy Fitzsimmons	The Hives
34	25 August 2023	"Soldat"	VC Barre, Pablo Paz and Takenoelz	Somna med Humlan Djojj	Humlan Djojj and Josefine Götestam
35	1 September 2023	"Prada"	Cassö, Raye and D-Block Europe	Somna med Humlan Djojj	Humlan Djojj and Josefine Götestam
36	8 September 2023	"Prada"	Cassö, Raye and D-Block Europe	Somna med Humlan Djojj	Humlan Djojj and Josefine Götestam
37	15 September 2023	"Saudade"	Hov1 and Håkan Hellström	Guts	Olivia Rodrigo
38	22 September 2023	"Farväl"	Bolaget	En annan jag	Darin
39	29 September 2023	"Dans från dig"	Einár, Sara Kurt and Le Winter	Neutronstjärnan	Lars Winnerbäck
40	6 October 2023	"Go"	Ant Wan	Neutronstjärnan	Lars Winnerbäck
41	13 October 2023	"Automatic"	C.Gambino	Neutronstjärnan	Lars Winnerbäck
42	20 October 2023	"Automatic"	C.Gambino	Superlativ 97	Thomas Stenström
43	27 October 2023	"Det kommer aldrig va över för mig"	Veronica Maggio	Hackney Diamonds	The Rolling Stones
44	3 November 2023	"Det kommer aldrig va över för mig"	Veronica Maggio	1989 (Taylor's Version)	Taylor Swift
45	10 November 2023	"Si No Estás"	Iñigo Quintero	Spår av blod	Asme
46	17 November 2023	"Hjärta"	B.Baby	Somna med Humlan Djojj	Humlan Djojj and Josefine Götestam
47	24 November 2023	"Bättre nu (The Wedding)"	Peg Parnevik	Somna med Humlan Djojj	Humlan Djojj and Josefine Götestam
48	1 December 2023	"Last Christmas"	Wham!	Somna med Humlan Djojj	Humlan Djojj and Josefine Götestam
49	8 December 2023	"Last Christmas"	Wham!	Honor the Light	Zara Larsson
50	15 December 2023	"Last Christmas"	Wham!	Honor the Light	Zara Larsson
51	22 December 2023	"Last Christmas"	Wham!	Honor the Light	Zara Larsson
52	29 December 2023	"Last Christmas"	Wham!	Christmas	Michael Bublé

=== 2024 ===
Week	Date	Song title	Performer	Album title	Performer
1	5 January 2024	"Låt mig va"	Bolaget and Victor Leksell	Somna med Humlan Djojj	Humlan Djojj and Josefine Götestam
2	12 January 2024	"Svar"	C.Gambino	In Memory of Some Stand Up Guys	C.Gambino
3	19 January 2024	"Svar"	C.Gambino	In Memory of Some Stand Up Guys	C.Gambino
4	26 January 2024	"Lean and Sprite"	Owen and Asme	Tid & tro	Victor Leksell
5	2 February 2024	"Kite"	Benjamin Ingrosso	In Memory of Some Stand Up Guys	C.Gambino
6	9 February 2024	"Lean and Sprite"	Owen and Asme	Tid & tro	Victor Leksell
7	16 February 2024	"Lean and Sprite"	Owen and Asme	For Those Who Believed	Ant Wan
8	23 February 2024	"Unga & fria"	Fröken Snusk	For Those Who Believed	Ant Wan
9	1 March 2024	"Unga & fria"	Fröken Snusk	Somna med Humlan Djojj	Humlan Djojj and Josefine Götestam
10	8 March 2024	"Unga & fria"	Fröken Snusk	The Mandrake Project	Bruce Dickinson
11	15 March 2024	"Unforgettable"	Marcus & Martinus	Invincible Shield	Judas Priest
12	22 March 2024	"Que Sera"	Medina	Somna med Humlan Djojj	Humlan Djojj and Josefine Götestam
13	29 March 2024	"Vem fan e du?"	Hooja and Miriam Bryant	In Memory of Some Stand Up Guys (Private Collection)	C.Gambino
14	5 April 2024	"Vem fan e du?"	Hooja and Miriam Bryant	Cowboy Carter	Beyoncé
15	12 April 2024	"Vem fan e du?"	Hooja and Miriam Bryant	Somna med Humlan Djojj	Humlan Djojj and Josefine Götestam
16	19 April 2024	"Vem fan e du?"	Hooja and Miriam Bryant	Somna med Humlan Djojj	Humlan Djojj and Josefine Götestam
17	26 April 2024	"I Like the Way You Kiss Me"	Artemas	The Tortured Poets Department	Taylor Swift
18	3 May 2024	"A Bar Song (Tipsy)"	Shaboozey	The Tortured Poets Department	Taylor Swift
19	10 May 2024	"A Bar Song (Tipsy)"	Shaboozey	The Tortured Poets Department	Taylor Swift
20	17 May 2024	"A Bar Song (Tipsy)"	Shaboozey	Jag önskar jag brydde mig mer	Hov1
21	24 May 2024	"A Bar Song (Tipsy)"	Shaboozey	Hit Me Hard and Soft	Billie Eilish
22	31 May 2024	"A Bar Song (Tipsy)"	Shaboozey	Hit Me Hard and Soft	Billie Eilish
23	7 June 2024	"A Bar Song (Tipsy)"	Shaboozey	Hit Me Hard and Soft	Billie Eilish
24	14 June 2024	"Sista gång"	C.Gambino	In Memory of Some Stand Up Guys (Private Collection)	C.Gambino
25	21 June 2024	"Look Who's Laughing Now"	Benjamin Ingrosso	Hit Me Hard and Soft	Billie Eilish
26	28 June 2024	"Look Who's Laughing Now"	Benjamin Ingrosso	Hit Me Hard and Soft	Billie Eilish
27	5 July 2024	"A Bar Song (Tipsy)"	Shaboozey	Hit Me Hard and Soft	Billie Eilish
28	12 July 2024	"A Bar Song (Tipsy)"	Shaboozey	Hit Me Hard and Soft	Billie Eilish
29	19 July 2024	"A Bar Song (Tipsy)"	Shaboozey	The Death of Slim Shady (Coup de Grâce)	Eminem
30	26 July 2024	"A Bar Song (Tipsy)"	Shaboozey	=1	Deep Purple
31	2 August 2024	"A Bar Song (Tipsy)"	Shaboozey	Rite Here Rite Now	Ghost
32	9 August 2024	"A Bar Song (Tipsy)"	Shaboozey	Somna med Humlan Djojj	Humlan Djojj and Josefine Götestam
33	16 August 2024	"Regnblöta skor"	Miriam Bryant	Avenge the Fallen	HammerFall
34	23 August 2024	"Regnblöta skor"	Miriam Bryant	Somna med Humlan Djojj	Humlan Djojj and Josefine Götestam
35	30 August 2024	"Regnblöta skor"	Miriam Bryant	Wanderland	Ant Wan
36	6 September 2024	"I Might"	Sarettii	...Men det gör jag egentligen	Hov1
37	13 September 2024	"I Might"	Sarettii	...Men det gör jag egentligen	Hov1
38	20 September 2024	"I Might"	Sarettii	...Men det gör jag egentligen	Hov1
39	27 September 2024	"Lost and Found"	Molly Sandén and Victor Leksell	Somna med Humlan Djojj	Humlan Djojj and Josefine Götestam
40	4 October 2024	"Lost and Found"	Molly Sandén and Victor Leksell	Somna med Humlan Djojj	Humlan Djojj and Josefine Götestam
41	11 October 2024	"Lost and Found"	Molly Sandén and Victor Leksell	Moon Music	Coldplay
42	18 October 2024	"Cecilia Lind"	Yasin	Somna med Humlan Djojj	Humlan Djojj and Josefine Götestam
43	25 October 2024	"Cecilia Lind"	Yasin	Somliga av oss	Thåström
44	1 November 2024	"Cecilia Lind"	Yasin	Pink Velvet Theatre	Benjamin Ingrosso
45	8 November 2024	"Lost and Found"	Molly Sandén and Victor Leksell	Songs of a Lost World	The Cure
46	15 November 2024	"Lost and Found"	Molly Sandén and Victor Leksell	Somna med Humlan Djojj	Humlan Djojj and Josefine Götestam
47	22 November 2024	"Lost and Found"	Molly Sandén and Victor Leksell	Yemaya	Jireel
48	29 November 2024	"Last Christmas"	Wham!	GNX	Kendrick Lamar
49	6 December 2024	"Last Christmas"	Wham!	Somna med Humlan Djojj	Humlan Djojj and Josefine Götestam
50	13 December 2024	"Last Christmas"	Wham!	Somna med Humlan Djojj	Humlan Djojj and Josefine Götestam
51	20 December 2024	"Last Christmas"	Wham!	Somna med Humlan Djojj	Humlan Djojj and Josefine Götestam
52	27 December 2024	"Last Christmas"	Wham!	Christmas	Michael Bublé

=== 2025 ===
Week	Date	Song title	Performer	Album title	Performer
1	3 January 2025	"Längesen"	Bolaget	Somna med Humlan Djojj	Humlan Djojj and Josefine Götestam
2	10 January 2025	"Längesen"	Bolaget	Somna med Humlan Djojj	Humlan Djojj and Josefine Götestam
3	17 January 2025	"Min Bitch"	Yasin	Lost Tapes	Yasin
4	24 January 2025	"Lucky Luciano"	23	Lost Tapes	Yasin
5	31 January 2025	"Apt."	Rosé and Bruno Mars	Somna med Humlan Djojj	Humlan Djojj and Josefine Götestam
6	7 February 2025	"Apt."	Rosé and Bruno Mars	Overdriver	The Hellacopters
7	14 February 2025	"Bullerbyn är död"	Simon Superti	Somna med Humlan Djojj	Humlan Djojj and Josefine Götestam
8	21 February 2025	"On and On and On"	Klara Hammarström	Somna med Humlan Djojj	Humlan Djojj and Josefine Götestam
9	28 February 2025	"Bara bada bastu"	KAJ	Somna med Humlan Djojj	Humlan Djojj and Josefine Götestam
10	7 March 2025	"Bara bada bastu"	KAJ	Somna med Humlan Djojj	Humlan Djojj and Josefine Götestam
11	14 March 2025	"Bara bada bastu"	KAJ	Somna med Humlan Djojj	Humlan Djojj and Josefine Götestam
12	21 March 2025	"Bara bada bastu"	KAJ	Somna med Humlan Djojj	Humlan Djojj and Josefine Götestam
13	28 March 2025	"Bara bada bastu"	KAJ	Vapen & ammunition	Kent
14	4 April 2025	"Bara bada bastu"	KAJ	Innan kronan blir för tung	Magnus Uggla
15	11 April 2025	"Bara bada bastu"	KAJ	Somna med Humlan Djojj	Humlan Djojj and Josefine Götestam
16	18 April 2025	"Bara bada bastu"	KAJ	Somna med Humlan Djojj	Humlan Djojj and Josefine Götestam
17	25 April 2025	"Bara bada bastu"	KAJ	Somna med Humlan Djojj	Humlan Djojj and Josefine Götestam
18	2 May 2025	"Bara bada bastu"	KAJ	Skeletá	Ghost
19	9 May 2025	"Bara bada bastu"	KAJ	Förstår om du inte förstår	23
20	16 May 2025	"Bara bada bastu"	KAJ	Somna med Humlan Djojj	Humlan Djojj and Josefine Götestam
21	23 May 2025	"Bara bada bastu"	KAJ	Somna med Humlan Djojj	Humlan Djojj and Josefine Götestam
22	30 May 2025	"Tusen spänn"	Tjuvjakt and Fanny Avonne	Somna med Humlan Djojj	Humlan Djojj and Josefine Götestam
23	6 June 2025	"Tusen spänn"	Tjuvjakt and Fanny Avonne	Somna med Humlan Djojj	Humlan Djojj and Josefine Götestam
24	13 June 2025	"Tusen spänn"	Tjuvjakt and Fanny Avonne	Somna med Humlan Djojj	Humlan Djojj and Josefine Götestam
25	20 June 2025	"Tusen spänn"	Tjuvjakt and Fanny Avonne	Somna med Humlan Djojj	Humlan Djojj and Josefine Götestam
26	27 June 2025	"Tusen spänn"	Tjuvjakt and Fanny Avonne	Somna med Humlan Djojj	Humlan Djojj and Josefine Götestam
27	4 July 2025	"Tusen spänn"	Tjuvjakt and Fanny Avonne	Tracks II: The Lost Albums	Bruce Springsteen
28	11 July 2025	"Tusen spänn"	Tjuvjakt and Fanny Avonne	Somna med Humlan Djojj	Humlan Djojj and Josefine Götestam
29	18 July 2025	"Tusen spänn"	Tjuvjakt and Fanny Avonne	Somna med Humlan Djojj	Humlan Djojj and Josefine Götestam
30	25 July 2025	"Tusen spänn"	Tjuvjakt and Fanny Avonne	Somna med Humlan Djojj	Humlan Djojj and Josefine Götestam
31	1 August 2025	"Golden"	Huntrix	KPop Demon Hunters (Soundtrack from the Netflix Film)	Various artists
32	8 August 2025	"Golden"	Huntrix	KPop Demon Hunters (Soundtrack from the Netflix Film)	Various artists
33	15 August 2025	"Golden"	Huntrix	KPop Demon Hunters (Soundtrack from the Netflix Film)	Various artists
34	22 August 2025	"Golden"	Huntrix	KPop Demon Hunters (Soundtrack from the Netflix Film)	Various artists
35	29 August 2025	"Golden"	Huntrix	KPop Demon Hunters (Soundtrack from the Netflix Film)	Various artists
36	5 September 2025	"Golden"	Huntrix	Förr nu & forever	Hov1
37	12 September 2025	"Golden"	Huntrix	KPop Demon Hunters (Soundtrack from the Netflix Film)	Various artists
38	19 September 2025	"Golden"	Huntrix	KPop Demon Hunters (Soundtrack from the Netflix Film)	Various artists
39	26 September 2025	"Golden"	Huntrix	KPop Demon Hunters (Soundtrack from the Netflix Film)	Various artists
40	3 October 2025	"Golden"	Huntrix	Midnight Sun	Zara Larsson
41	10 October 2025	"The Fate of Ophelia"	Taylor Swift	The Life of a Showgirl	Taylor Swift
42	17 October 2025	"The Fate of Ophelia"	Taylor Swift	The Life of a Showgirl	Taylor Swift
43	24 October 2025	"Golden"	Huntrix	Svensk rost	Håkan Hellström
44	31 October 2025	"Golden"	Huntrix	The Life of a Showgirl	Taylor Swift
45	7 November 2025	"Golden"	Huntrix	Somna med Humlan Djojj	Humlan Djojj and Josefine Götestam
46	14 November 2025	"The Fate of Ophelia"	Taylor Swift	Somna med Humlan Djojj	Humlan Djojj and Josefine Götestam
47	21 November 2025	"The Fate of Ophelia"	Taylor Swift	Somna med Humlan Djojj	Humlan Djojj and Josefine Götestam
48	28 November 2025	"The Fate of Ophelia"	Taylor Swift	Somna med Humlan Djojj	Humlan Djojj and Josefine Götestam
49	5 December 2025	"Last Christmas"	Wham!	Skebokvarnsv. 209 (20-års jubileum)	Thåström
50	12 December 2025	"Last Christmas"	Wham!	Somna med Humlan Djojj	Humlan Djojj and Josefine Götestam
51	19 December 2025	"Last Christmas"	Wham!	Somna med Humlan Djojj	Humlan Djojj and Josefine Götestam
52	26 December 2025	"Last Christmas"	Wham!	Julen är här	Tommy Körberg

=== 2026 ===
Week	Date	Song title	Performer	Album title	Performer
1	2 January 2026	"The Fate of Ophelia"	Taylor Swift	Somna med Humlan Djojj	Humlan Djojj and Josefine Götestam
2	9 January 2026	"Djurens vaggvisa"	Humlan Djojj and Josefine Götestam	Somna med Humlan Djojj	Humlan Djojj and Josefine Götestam
3	16 January 2026	"End of Beginning"	Djo	Somna med Humlan Djojj	Humlan Djojj and Josefine Götestam
4	23 January 2026	"Lush Life"	Zara Larsson	Somna med Humlan Djojj	Humlan Djojj and Josefine Götestam
5	30 January 2026	"Lush Life"	Zara Larsson	Somna med Humlan Djojj	Humlan Djojj and Josefine Götestam
6	6 February 2026	"Iconic"	A-Teens	Somna med Humlan Djojj	Humlan Djojj and Josefine Götestam
7	13 February 2026	"My System"	Felicia	Somna med Humlan Djojj	Humlan Djojj and Josefine Götestam
8	20 February 2026	"My System"	Felicia	Somna med Humlan Djojj	Humlan Djojj and Josefine Götestam
9	27 February 2026	"My System"	Felicia	Somna med Humlan Djojj	Humlan Djojj and Josefine Götestam
10	6 March 2026	"My System"	Felicia	Somna med Humlan Djojj	Humlan Djojj and Josefine Götestam
11	13 March 2026	"My System"	Felicia	Kiss All the Time. Disco, Occasionally.	Harry Styles
12	20 March 2026	"My System"	Felicia	Somna med Humlan Djojj	Humlan Djojj and Josefine Götestam
13	27 March 2026	"My System"	Felicia	Somna med Humlan Djojj	Humlan Djojj and Josefine Götestam
14	3 April 2026	"My System"	Felicia	Sexistential	Robyn
15	10 April 2026	"My System"	Felicia	Somna med Humlan Djojj	Humlan Djojj and Josefine Götestam
16	17 April 2026	"My System"	Felicia	Somna med Humlan Djojj	Humlan Djojj and Josefine Götestam
17	24 April 2026	"Beauty and a Beat"	Justin Bieber featuring Nicki Minaj	Somna med Humlan Djojj	Humlan Djojj and Josefine Götestam
18	1 May 2026	"Beauty and a Beat"	Justin Bieber featuring Nicki Minaj	The Ghost of a Future Dead	At the Gates
19	8 May 2026	"Djurens vaggvisa"	Humlan Djojj and Josefine Götestam	Flytta isbergen, vattna svärmorstungan, ta med soporna ut (Live)	Thåström
20	15 May 2026	"Djurens vaggvisa"	Humlan Djojj and Josefine Götestam	Somna med Humlan Djojj	Humlan Djojj and Josefine Götestam
21	22 May 2026	"Bangaranga"	Dara	Iceman	Drake
22	29 May 2026	"Bangaranga"	Dara	Somna med Humlan Djojj	Humlan Djojj and Josefine Götestam
23	5 June 2026	"När vi gräver guld i USA"	Tjuvjakt, Simon Strömstedt and Julia Glenmark	Framtiden som aldrig blev av	Joakim Berg
24	12 June 2026	"Det ligger nåt i luften"	Bolaget	Somna med Humlan Djojj	Humlan Djojj and Josefine Götestam
25	19 June 2026	"Det ligger nåt i luften"	Bolaget	You Seem Pretty Sad for a Girl So in Love	Olivia Rodrigo
26	26 June 2026	"Det ligger nåt i luften"	Bolaget	Somna med Humlan Djojj	Humlan Djojj and Josefine Götestam
27	3 July 2026	"Det ligger nåt i luften"	Bolaget	Somna med Humlan Djojj	Humlan Djojj and Josefine Götestam
28	10 July 2026	"Dai Dai"	Shakira and Burna Boy	Somna med Humlan Djojj	Humlan Djojj and Josefine Götestam
29	17 July 2026	"Dai Dai"	Shakira and Burna Boy	Foreign Tongues	The Rolling Stones
30	24 July 2026	"Dai Dai"	Shakira and Burna Boy	Somna med Humlan Djojj	Humlan Djojj and Josefine Götestam
31	31 July 2026	"Dai Dai"	Shakira and Burna Boy	Somna med Humlan Djojj	Humlan Djojj and Josefine Götestam
32	7 August 2026	"Dai Dai"	Shakira and Burna Boy	Somna med Humlan Djojj	Humlan Djojj and Josefine Götestam
33	14 August 2026	"Tänk om"	Victor Leksell and Molly Sandén	Somna med Humlan Djojj	Humlan Djojj and Josefine Götestam
34	21 August 2026	"Dai Dai"	Shakira and Burna Boy	Somna med Humlan Djojj	Humlan Djojj and Josefine Götestam
35	28 August 2026	"Dai Dai"	Shakira and Burna Boy	Somna med Humlan Djojj	Humlan Djojj and Josefine Götestam
36	4 September 2026	"Djurens vaggvisa"	Humlan Djojj and Josefine Götestam	Somna med Humlan Djojj	Humlan Djojj and Josefine Götestam
37	11 September 2026	"Om du frågar Nooshi"	Fröken Snusk, Rasmus Gozzi and Louise Andersson Bodin	Somna med Humlan Djojj	Humlan Djojj and Josefine Götestam
38	18 September 2026	"Om du frågar Nooshi"	Fröken Snusk, Rasmus Gozzi and Louise Andersson Bodin	Somna med Humlan Djojj	Humlan Djojj and Josefine Götestam
39	25 September 2026	"Djurens vaggvisa"	Humlan Djojj and Josefine Götestam	Somna med Humlan Djojj	Humlan Djojj and Josefine Götestam
40	2 October 2026	"Djurens vaggvisa"	Humlan Djojj and Josefine Götestam	Längtan till våren	Lars Winnerbäck
41	9 October 2026	"Djurens vaggvisa"	Humlan Djojj and Josefine Götestam	Somna med Humlan Djojj	Humlan Djojj and Josefine Götestam
42	16 October 2026	"Djurens vaggvisa"	Humlan Djojj and Josefine Götestam	Somna med Humlan Djojj	Humlan Djojj and Josefine Götestam
43	23 October 2026	"Djurens vaggvisa"	Humlan Djojj and Josefine Götestam	Somna med Humlan Djojj	Humlan Djojj and Josefine Götestam
44	30 October 2026	"Housewife"	Tate McRae	Somna med Humlan Djojj	Humlan Djojj and Josefine Götestam
45	6 November 2026	"Housewife"	Tate McRae	Somna med Humlan Djojj	Humlan Djojj and Josefine Götestam
46	13 November 2026	"Mayday"	Keisha	Somna med Humlan Djojj	Humlan Djojj and Josefine Götestam
47	20 November 2026	"Mayday"	Keisha	Carnaval de Luz	U2

== Longest running number one ==
=== Most weeks at number one on the singles chart ===
Weeks	Date	Song title	Performer
22	12 August 1977	"Yes Sir, I Can Boogie"	Baccara
17	12 September 2002	"The Ketchup Song"	Las Ketchup
17	29 December 2017	"Last Christmas"	Wham!
16	12 December 1980	"När vi två blir en"	Gyllene Tider
15	28 April 2017	"Despacito (Remix)"	Luis Fonsi and Daddy Yankee featuring Justin Bieber
14	24 August 1976	"Dancing Queen"	ABBA
14	9 October 1979	"Oh! Susie"	Secret Service
14	24 January 2020	"Svag"	Victor Leksell
14	21 April 2023	"Ikväll igen"	Bolaget
13	28 September 2012	"Don't You Worry Child"	Swedish House Mafia
13	13 January 2017	"Shape of You"	Ed Sheeran
13	28 February 2025	"Bara bada bastu"	KAJ
12	30 November 1976	"Daddy Cool"	Boney M.
12	20 October 1978	"You're the One That I Want"	John Travolta & Olivia Newton-John
12	9 February 1979	"Y.M.C.A"	Village People
12	11 July 1980	"One More Reggae for the Road"	Bill Lovelady
12	14 August 1991	"(Everything I Do) I Do It For You"	Bryan Adams
12	24 June 1992	"Abba-esque"	Erasure
12	27 October 1995	"Gangsta's Paradise"	Coolio feat. LV
12	28 June 2013	"Wake Me Up!"	Avicii
12	3 May 2024	"A Bar Song (Tipsy)"	Shaboozey
12	1 August 2025	"Golden"	Huntrix
11	27 February 1998	"My Heart Will Go On"	Céline Dion
11	26 November 2010	"Mikrofonkåt"	September

=== Most weeks at number one on the albums chart ===
Weeks	Date	Album title	Performer	Language
57	6 January 2023	"Somna med Humlan Djojj"	Humlan Djojj and Josefine Götestam	Swedish
27	26 June 2020	"Fånga mig när jag faller"	Victor Leksell	Swedish
15	9 November 2012	"Infruset"	Mando Diao	Swedish
14	20 November 2015	"Purpose"	Justin Bieber	English
12	20 September 2013	"True"	Avicii	English
12	28 May 2021	"Sour"	Olivia Rodrigo	English
9	17 April 2008	"Rockferry"	Duffy	English
9	6 May 2011	"Satan i gatan"	Veronica Maggio	Swedish
9	6 July 2012	"40/40: 40 År 40 Hits - Ett Samlingsalbum 1972–2012"	Tomas Ledin	Swedish
9	13 April 2018	"Gudarna på Västerbron"	Hov1	Swedish
9	3 March 2023	"Pistoler poesi och sex"	Yasin	Swedish
8	1 July 2016	"Road Trip"	Lasse Stefanz	Swedish
8	1 August 2025	"KPop Demon Hunters (Soundtrack from the Netflix Film)"	KPop Demon Hunters Cast	English & Korean
7	14 February 2008	"e²"	Eros Ramazzotti	Italian
7	3 July 2009	"Masser af succes"	Gasolin'	Danish
7	16 December 2011	Christmas	Michael Bublé	English
7	12 November 2021	"Voyage"	ABBA	English
7	24 May 2024	"Hit Me Hard and Soft"	Billie Eilish	English

== See also ==
- List of number-one singles on Tio i Topp, a contemporary official Swedish chart compiling a list between 1961 and 1974.
