= Niklas Strömstedt discography =

Cataloging of published recordings by Niklas Strömstedt

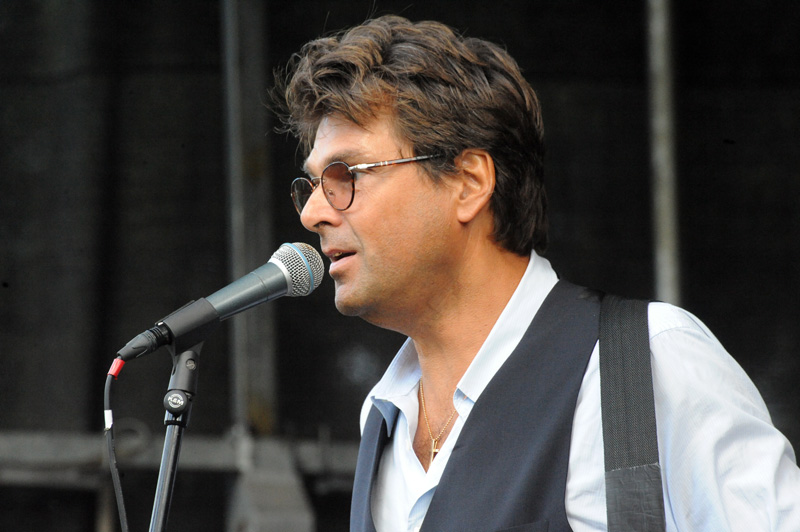
- Performing in Stockholm, Sweden in 2013
- Studio albums: 8
- Compilation albums: 5
- Singles: 29

The discography of Swedish musician Niklas Strömstedt consists of eight studio albums, five compilation albums and 29 singles.

== Albums ==
=== Studio albums ===
Title	Album details	Peak chart positions		Certifications
Title	Album details	SWE	NOR	Certifications
Skjut inte... det är bara jag!	Released: 1981; Label: EMI; Parlophone; Formats: LP	26	—	
Andra äventyr	Released: 1983; Label: EMI; Formats: LP	—	—	
En gång i livet	Released: 1989; Label: EMI; Formats: LP; CD	—	25	
Om!	Released: 1990; Label: Polar; WEA; Formats: LP; cassette; CD	1	18	SWE: Platinum
Halvvägs till framtiden	Released: 1992; Label: Metronome; Formats: LP; cassette; CD	5	—	
Långt liv i lycka	Released: 1997; Label: Metronome; Formats: Cassette; CD	1	—	SWE: Platinum
Du blir du jag blir jag	Released: 2001; Label: Metronome; Formats: CD	4	—	
Två vägar	Released: 19 March 2008; Label: Metronome; Formats: CD	38	—	
"—" denotes a title that did not chart, or was not released in that territory.

=== Compilation albums ===
Title	Album details	Peak chart positions	Certifications
Title	Album details	SWE	Certifications
Tårar i regn	Released: 1990; Label: EMI; Formats: CD	—	
Oslagbara 1989–99	Released: 1998; Label: Metronome; Formats: CD	4	SWE: Platinum
Klassiker	Released: 2005; Label: Metronome; Formats: CD	—	
30 år i kärlekens tjänst	Released: 7 December 2009; Label: WEA; Formats: CD	32	
Storhetsvansinne – Världens bästa samlingsplatta	Released: 16 October 2015; Label: Metronome; Formats: CD	38	
"—" denotes a title that did not chart, or was not released in that territory.

== Singles ==
Title	Year	Peak chart positions		Certifications	Album
Title	Year	SWE	NOR	Certifications	Album
"Jag ringer dej"	1980	—	—		Skjut inte... det är bara jag!
"Om och om igen"	1981	—	—		Skjut inte... det är bara jag!
"Gå inte än"	1981	—	—		Skjut inte... det är bara jag!
"Alarm"	1982	—	—		Andra äventyr
"En annan hand"	1983	—	—		Andra äventyr
"Jealousy"	1983	—	—		Non-album single
"Precis som ett barn"	1985	—	—		En gång i livet
"Sista morgonen"	1988	5	—	SWE: Gold	En gång i livet
"En kvinna och en man" (with Anne-Lie Rydé)	1989	—	—		En gång i livet
"Förlorad igen"	1989	—	—		En gång i livet
"Om"	1990	1	6	SWE: Gold	Om!
"Vart du än går"	1990	13	—		Om!
"Flickor talar om kärleken (Män dom gör just ingenting alls)"	1990	—	—		Om!
"Runt, runt, runt"	1991	—	—		Om!
"En väg till mitt hjärta"	1991	—	—		Om!
"Halvvägs till framtiden"	1992	17	—		Halvvägs till framtiden
"Bilderna av dej"	1992	—	—		Halvvägs till framtiden
"I hennes rum"	1993	—	—		Halvvägs till framtiden
"Oslagbara"	1993	—	—		Halvvägs till framtiden
"Sånt är livet"	1996	38	—		Långt liv i lycka
"Inga änglar gråter"	1997	—	—		Långt liv i lycka
"24 timmar"	1997	—	—		Långt liv i lycka
"Färja ut i rymden"	1997	—	—		Långt liv i lycka
"Nu har det landat en ängel"	1998	—	—		Non-album single
"Med nyförälskad hand"	2001	—	—		Du blir du jag blir jag
"Röd som blod"	2001	—	—		Du blir du jag blir jag
"Vakta min ensamhet"	2001	—	—		Du blir du jag blir jag
"Vi vet"	2007	—	—		Två vägar
"För många ord om kärlek"	2008	—	—		Två vägar
"—" denotes a title that did not chart, or was not released in that territory.

== See also ==
- Glenmark Eriksson Strömstedt discography
