= Norell Oson Bard =

Swedish songwriting and production trio

Norell Oson Bard was a Swedish songwriting and production trio made up of Tim Norell, Ola Håkansson and Alexander Bard. Their production output peaked around the year 1990, creating pop music and disco hits for Swedish artists.

Norell died from cancer on 16 December 2023 at the age of 68.

== Music by Norell Oson Bard ==
- Agnetha Fältskog & Ola Håkansson – "Fly Like the Eagle"
- Agnetha Fältskog & Ola Håkansson – "The Way You Are"
- Andreas Lundstedt – "Driver dagg faller regn"
- Andreas Lundstedt – "Hey-Ya Hey-Ya"
- Andreas Lundstedt – "Jag saknar dig, jag saknar dig"
- Andreas Lundstedt – "Tears in the Rain"
- Ankie Bagger – "Bang Bang"
- Ankie Bagger – "Coming From the Heart"
- Ankie Bagger – "Every Day Every Hour"
- Ankie Bagger – "If You're Alone Tonight"
- Ankie Bagger – "Sandy, Sandy"
- Ankie Bagger – "The Way I Dream About You"
- Ankie Bagger – "When I Call Your Name"
- Ankie Bagger – "Where Is Love?"
- Ankie Bagger – "Where Were You Last Night"
- Arvingarna – "Jeannie"
- Barbados – "Bye Bye Dreamer"
- Barbados – "California Nights"
- Barbados – "If I Do"
- Barbados – "Little Girl"
- Barbados – "When the Summer Is Gone"
- Boppers – "Gonna Find My Angel"
- Boppers – "Jeannie's Coming Back"
- Boppers – "Kissing in the Moonlight"
- Inger Lise Rypdal – "Innan gryningen är här"
- Jerry Williams – "It Started With a Love Affair"
- Jerry Williams – "Who's gonna Follow You Home"
- Jerry Williams – "When Your Heartache Is Over"
- Jerry Williams – "Lucy Wrote Me a Letter"
- Jerry Williams – "Goodbye Rolling Stone"
- Jerry Williams – "When the Summer Is gone"
- Kajsa Mellgren – "Angel Eye"
- Kayo – "So Fine"
- Lili & Sussie – "Best Years of Our Lives"
- Lili & Sussie – "Boyfriend"
- Lili & Sussie – "Can't Let You Go"
- Lili & Sussie – "Every Step You Take"
- Lili & Sussie – "Girl With a Broken Heart"
- Lili & Sussie – "Let's Have a Party"
- Lili & Sussie – "Love Makes the World Spin Around"
- Lili & Sussie – "Sending Out a Message"
- Lili & Sussie – "We Were Only Dancing"
- Lili & Sussie – "What's the Colour of Love"
- Pernilla Wahlgren – "Are You Ready"
- Pernilla Wahlgren – "Give a Little Love"
- Secret Service – "Bring Heaven Down"
- Secret Service – "Destiny of Love"
- Secret Service – "I'm So I'm So I'm So (I'm So in Love With You)"
- Secret Service – "The Sound of the Rain"
- The Sylvesters – "Happy Happy Years for Us All"
- Tommy Nilsson – "En dag" / "Some Day"
- Tommy Nilsson & Tone Norum – "Allt som jag känner"
- Tone Norum & Tommy Nilsson – "My Summer with You (English version of Allt som jag känner)
- Troll – "Jimmy Dean"
- Troll – "Can't You See What I See?"
- Troll – "Could It Be Magic?"
- Troll – "Midsummer Night"
- The Tuesdays – "What Is Love"
- West of Sunset – "Before I Trust My Heart"
- Zemya Hamilton & Tommy Nilsson – "Time"
