= Oslagbara 1989–99 =

1998 greatest hits album by Niklas Strömstedt

Greatest hits album by Niklas Strömstedt
- Released: 1998
- Recorded: 1988–1998
- Genre: Rock; pop
- Length: 1:14:48
- Label: Metronome
- Producer: Niklas Strömstedt

Niklas Strömstedt chronology
Långt liv i lycka (1997)	Oslagbara 1989–99 (1998)	Du blir du jag blir jag (2001)

Oslagbara 1989–99 is the first greatest hits album by Swedish singer-songwriter Niklas Strömstedt, released in 1998, by Metronome Records.

== Track listing ==
All tracks are written by Niklas Strömstedt

Oslagbara 1989–99 – Standard edition
No.	Title	Original album	Length
1.	"Nu har det landat en ängel"	1998 standalone single	3:55
2.	"Sista morgonen"	En gång i livet (1989)	3:19
3.	"En kvinna och en man"	En gång i livet (1989)	4:36
4.	"Förlorad igen"	En gång i livet (1989)	3:51
5.	"Om"	Om! (1990)	4:05
6.	"Vart du än går"	Om! (1990)	3:59
7.	"Flickor talar om kärleken (Män dom gör just ingenting alls)"	Om! (1990)	3:47
8.	"En väg till mitt hjärta"	Om! (1990)	3:40
9.	"December utan dej"		4:11
10.	"Halvvägs till framtiden"	Halvvägs till framtiden (1992)	4:04
11.	"I hennes rum"	Halvvägs till framtiden (1992)	4:23
12.	"Oslagbara"	Halvvägs till framtiden (1992)	3:45
13.	"Bilderna av dej"	Halvvägs till framtiden (1992)	4:38
14.	"Sånt är livet"	Långt liv i lycka (1997)	4:38
15.	"Inga änglar gråter"	Långt liv i lycka (1997)	4:45
16.	"24 timmar"	Långt liv i lycka (1997)	4:00
17.	"Färja ut i rymden"	Långt liv i lycka (1997)	4:35
18.	"Byns enda blondin"	Byns enda blondin (1994)	4:37
Total length:			1:14:48

== Chart ==
Weekly chart performance for Oslagbara 1989–99
Chart (1998–1999)	Peak position
Swedish Albums (Sverigetopplistan)	4
