= Tänd ett ljus =

1987 single by Triad

Single by Triad

from the album Triad
- Language: Swedish
- Released: 1987
- Genre: Rock; pop; Christmas; a cappella
- Length: 4:47
- Label: EMI
- Songwriters: Lasse Lindbom; Niklas Strömstedt
- Producer: Triad

Triad singles chronology
"Tänd ett ljus" (1987)	"Som en bro över floden" (1988)

Music video
- "Tänd ett ljus" on YouTube

"Tänd ett ljus" (transl. "Light a Candle") is a song written by Niklas Strömstedt and Lasse Lindbom and recorded by Swedish band Triad in 1987. The outro includes Christmas and New Year's greetings in different languages. The song is sung a cappella with finger-snapping in the background. The single topped the Swedish singles chart on 6 January 1988. The song was at Svensktoppen for eight weeks during the period 20 December 1987 through 14 February 1988.

The theme of the song is that Christmas will light a candle as a symbol of hope for a better world. It has become a Christmas classic in Sweden, and is often included in Christmas music collections.

In 1993, Shanes covered the song with musical accompaniment. In 2007, Sandelin & Ekman recorded their own cover.

== Personnel ==
Triad

- Lasse Lindbom – lead, harmony and background vocals; finger snapping
- Niklas Strömstedt – lead, harmony and background vocals; finger snapping
- Janne Bark – harmony and background vocals; finger snapping

== Charts ==
Chart (1987–1988)	Peak position
Sweden (Sverigetopplistan)	1
