= Glenmark Eriksson Strömstedt discography =

Cataloging of published recordings by Glenmark Eriksson Strömstedt

- Studio albums: 2
- Singles: 9

Swedish supergroup Glenmark Eriksson Strömstedt have released two studio albums and nine singles.

== Albums ==
=== Studio albums ===
List of studio albums, with selected chart positions
Title	Album details	Peak chart positions	
Title	Album details	NOR	SWE
Glenmark, Eriksson, Strömstedt	Released: 20 January 1995; Label: Metronome (SWE)	13	1
Den andra skivan	Released: 2003; Label: Columbia (SWE)	—	2

== Singles ==
List of singles, with selected chart positions
Title	Year	Peak chart positions	Album
Title	Year	SWE	Album
"När vi gräver guld i USA"	1994	1	Glenmark, Eriksson, Strömstedt
"En jävel på kärlek"	1994	5	Glenmark, Eriksson, Strömstedt
"Från dag till dag"	1995	—	Glenmark, Eriksson, Strömstedt
"Hon är min"	1995	—	Glenmark, Eriksson, Strömstedt
"Man gråter aldrig på en lördag"	1995	15	non-album single
"Stanna världen en stund"	1995	—	Glenmark, Eriksson, Strömstedt
"Den andra kvinnan"	2003	1	Den andra skivan
"Händerna på täcket"	2003	—	Den andra skivan
"Sångerna om sommaren"	2003	—	Den andra skivan
