= Strömstedt =

Strömstedt is a Swedish surname. Notable people with the surname include:

- Anna Karin Strömstedt (born 1981), Swedish cross-country skier and biathlete
- Jenny Strömstedt (born 1972), Swedish television host and journalist
- Lasse Strömstedt (1935–2009), Swedish writer
- Niklas Strömstedt (born 1958), Swedish singer and songwriter
- Ulla Strömstedt (1939–1986), Swedish actress
