= När vi gräver guld i USA =

1994 single by Glenmark Eriksson Strömstedt

Single by Glenmark Eriksson Strömstedt

from the album Glenmark, Eriksson, Strömstedt
- Language: Swedish
- English title: When we dug for gold in the USA
- B-side: "När vi gräver guld i USA (Matchmix)"
- Released: May 1994
- Studio: Polar (Stockholm)
- Genre: Pop rock; Europop
- Label: Metronome
- Songwriters: Anders Glenmark; Thomas Eriksson; Niklas Strömstedt
- Producer: Anders Glenmark

Glenmark Eriksson Strömstedt singles chronology
"När vi gräver guld i USA" (1994)	"En jävel på kärlek" (1994)

Music video
- "När vi gräver guld i USA" on YouTube

"När vi gräver guld i USA" ("When We Dig for Gold in the USA") was a song which was used as the fight song for the Sweden national team during the 1994 FIFA World Cup in the United States, where Sweden ended up third. During the Grammis Awards for 1994, it won the category "Song of the year 1994".

The song was written and recorded by Swedish pop trio Glenmark Eriksson Strömstedt. The words När vi gräver guld i USA (When we dig gold in the USA), which appear in the chorus, refer to both 19th century gold rushes in the USA, as well as to the gold medals awarded for the FIFA World Cup winner.

Staying at the Swedish singles chart for 40 weeks, the song later topped the chart.

The song also charted at Svensktoppen for nine weeks between 18 June and 13 August 1994, peaking at second position.

The song lyrics "Flickorna har blommor i sitt hår, där står alla pojkarna på rad, tillsammans är vi oslagbara!" contain references to three other songs from the members' solo careers. The songs are Anders Glenmark's "Hon har blommor i sitt hår", Orup's "Då står pojkarna på rad" and Niklas Strömstedt's "Oslagbara".

== Charts ==
=== Weekly charts ===
Weekly chart performance for "När vi gräver guld i USA"
Chart (1994–2022)	Peak position
Sweden (Sverigetopplistan)	1

=== Year-end charts ===
Year-end chart performance for "När vi gräver guld i USA"
Chart (1994)	Position
Sweden (Sverigetopplistan)	6

== Amanda Jenssen version ==
In October 2014, the song was performed during Så mycket bättre in season 5 of the Swedish musical series. During "Orup Dag" ("Orup Day") when the participants were to pick songs from Orup to perform, Amanda Jenssen chose "När vi gräver guld i USA" reinterpreting the English version as "When We Dig for Gold in the USA". Her interpretation was a toned down much slower version as compared to the original hectic version meant as a rally of support for the Sweden men's National Football Team.

Her interpretation became very popular with the public. The release of the new version as downloads resulted in the single reaching number 4 on the Swedish Singles Chart.

=== Charts ===
Chart (2014–2015)	Peak position
Sweden (Sverigetopplistan)	4

=== Certifications ===
Certifications for "When We Dig for Gold in the USA"
Region	Certification	Certified units/sales
Sweden (GLF)	Platinum	40,000^{‡}
^{‡} Sales+streaming figures based on certification alone.
