= Someone's Taken Maria Away =

1965 single by Adam Faith

Single by Adam Faith with the Roulettes and Chris Andrews
- B-side: "I Can't Think of Any One Else"
- Released: 11 June 1965
- Recorded: May 1965
- Studio: EMI Studios, London
- Genre: Calypso
- Length: 2:40
- Label: Parlophone
- Songwriter: Chris Andrews
- Producer: Chris Andrews

Adam Faith singles chronology
"Hand Me Down Things" (1965)	"Someone's Taken Maria Away" (1965)	"I Don't Need That Kind of Lovin'" (1965)

The Roulettes singles chronology
"I Hope He Breaks Your Heart" (1965)	"Someone's Taken Maria Away" (1965)	"The Long Cigarette" (1965)

Chris Andrews singles chronology
"Someone's Taken Maria Away" (1965)	"Yesterday Man" (1965)

Audio
- "Somebody's Taken Maria Away" on YouTube

"Someone's Taken Maria Away" is a song written by Chris Andrews, initially recorded by British singer Adam Faith and his backing group the Roulettes. It was Faith's final top-40 hit in the United Kingdom, reaching number 34 on the Record Retailer chart in June 1965. However, today it is most commonly known for the version recorded by Swedish band Tom & Mick & Maniacs under the title "Somebody's Taken Maria Away" in 1967; it reached number one on both Tio i Topp and Kvällstoppen during that autumn.

== Adam Faith version ==
During the late 1950s and early 1960s, singer Adam Faith was one of the most popular artists in the United Kingdom, scoring multiple hits on the UK Singles Chart, including the number-one singles "What Do You Want?" (1959) and "Poor Me" (1960). However, by 1965 his popularity was fading as he had not had a top-ten single since 1963's "The First Time", which had reached number five. In order to remedy this and try to once again see chart success, Faith's producer and songwriter Chris Andrews composed a song for him to record, titled "Someone's Taken Maria Away". The song was intentionally written as a pastiche of Burt Bacharach and Hal David while also being inspired by Unit 4 + 2's recent hit "Concrete and Clay".

"Someone's Taken Maria Away" was released by Parlophone Records on 11 June 1965, backed by "I Can't Think of Any One Else", which was written by guitarist John Rogan and bassist Peter Thorp of Faith's backing band the Roulettes. The song managed to enter the Record Retailer chart on 23 June 1965 at a position of number 42, before peaking at number 34 on 14 July. It exited the chart the following week at a position of number 48. The relative success temporarily put the spotlight back on Faith, though author Sharon Davis notes that this was "short-lived". Faith would not have another top-40 single on the UK singles chart following "Someone's Taken Maria Away"; his final charting single was "Cheryl's Goin' Home", which reached number 46 in October the following year.

According to writer Derek Johnson at New Musical Express, "Someone's Taken Maria Away" was a "colourful calypso" which bore similarities to Sandie Shaw's recent hit singles (Andrews also produced and wrote for Shaw). Johnson states that the song has "lilting guitar work" along with featuring "clavioline effects" on the backing vocals, that "all build up to a crescendo with staccato chanting" during the chorus of the song. In Record Mirror, Peter Jones and Norman Jopling state that the song will make Faith "hustle back into the charts", stating that it features a "rather gentle original backing". They claim that "Adam [Faith] sets the scene, then hammers away his heartbreak." Though they positively note the instrumental backing and calling it "effective", they claim that the song is slightly repetitive.

=== Charts ===
Chart (1965)	Peak position
UK Melody Maker Top 50	40
UK Record Retailer Top 50	34

== Tom & Mick & Maniacs version ==
=== Background and recording ===
"Somebody's Taken Maria Away"

Single by Tom & Mick & Maniacs
- B-side: "I Got the Feelin'"
- Released: 9 August 1967
- Recorded: 18 July 1967
- Studio: Europafilm, Stockholm
- Genre: Soul pop
- Length: 2:55
- Label: Columbia
- Songwriter: Chris Andrews
- Producer: Anders Henriksson

Tom & Mick & Maniacs singles chronology
"Never Be Anyone Else But You" (1967)	"Somebody's Taken Maria Away" (1967)	"Can I Get To Know You Better" (1967)

Audio
- "Somebody's Taken Maria Away" on YouTube

During April of 1967, Swedish group Maniacs, featuring vocalist Tommy Körberg, enjoyed success with their cover of James Brown's "Please, Please, Please", which reached number five on national charts Tio i Topp. However, during that summer, the band started undergoing a reform, on the basis of their manager Benny Englund. Their guitarist Örjan Englund quit the band and was replaced by Gunnar Kullenberg. Englund, who had ambitions on creating a Swedish equaivalent of Sam & Dave, hired Michael Johansson as a second vocalist, while also changing their name to Tom & Mick & Maniacs. For their debut single, "Someone's Taken Maria Away" was chosen on the ground that it was relatively obscure and could be transformed into a soul pop song.

"Somebody's Taken Away" was recorded by Tom & Mick on 18 July 1967 at Europafilm Studios in Bromma, a suburb of Stockholm. It was produced by Anders Henriksson, who previously had worked with bands such as the Shanes and Tages, having produced hits for them. The brass accompaniment was performed by Lasse Samuelssons orkester, Though whether the Maniacs perform on the record or not has been disputed. According to Göran Brandels, the brass gives the song a "kick it otherwise would've lacked" and claims it is a better version than that of Adam Faith, due to the change in genres. The chorus was also changed from "someone's" to "somebody's" which "rolled off the tongue more easily.

=== Release and reception ===
The song was released as "Somebody's Taken Maria Away", most likely on 9 August 1967, through Columbia Records in Sweden. The B-side was "I Got the Feelin'", a cover of a song written by Neil Diamond which he had released as a single the previous year. On Tio i Topp, "Somebody's Taken Maria Away" debuted at number-one on 9 September 1967, replacing Scott McKenzie's "San Francisco (Be Sure to Wear Flowers in Your Hair)". Despite being heavily promoted by their label, this chart success came as a relative chock for the band. "Somebody's Taken Maria Away" topped the chart for six weeks before itself was dislodged from the top on 21 October by Paul Jones' "Thinkin' Ain't For Me." That week, it was at number seven, and dropped out the following week at number 12. On sales chart Kvällstoppen, it debuted at number six on 19 September before topping the chart on 3 October, staying there for three weeks. It dropped off on 7 November at a position of 12. In neighboring Finland it reached number 21.

In Finland, the single was chosen as one out of three best international singles of the year, together with "Baby Now That I've Found You" by the Foundations and "Massachusetts" by the Bee Gees. Due to the success of the single, Körberg reportedly stated that it made him "cocky" because of how it spiralled him to stardom and opened doors to "drugs, sex and alcohol". It became the breakthrough of Körberg's career, which has spanned several decades, However, it began the break-up of the Maniacs, who were largely relegated to becoming a backing group for Tom & Mick. Nonetheless, Körberg considers "Somebody's Taken Maria Away" a highlight of his career, despite "it being one of my first".

=== Charts ===
Chart performance for "Somebody's Taken Maria Away"
Chart (1967)	Peak position
Finland (Suomen Virallinen)	21
Netherlands (Dutch Top 40)	31
Sweden (Kvällstoppen)	1
Sweden (Tio i Topp)	1
