= Till min kära =

Single by Thor Görans
- A-side: "Till min kära"
- B-side: "Varje natt och dag"; "Vill du bli min"
- Released: 1994
- Genre: dansband
- Label: Frituna
- Songwriter: Peter Grundström

"Till min kära" is a song written in 1993 by Peter Grundström of Thor Görans, recorded by Thor Görans, and released as a single in 1994. The recording was never tested for Svensktoppen.

A Streaplers recording stayed at Svensktoppen for 73 weeks beginning 16 September 1995 until 15 February 1997, which at the time was a new record. The song is also on the 1995 Streaplers album "Till min kära." The song was appointed "Svensktoppen song of the year" in 1996. During 1996 the song stayed at the Svensktoppen first place for 22 weeks.

Jørgen de Mylius wrote lyrics in Danish as "Til min kære," which was recorded by Danish dansband Kandis for the 2000 album Kandis 8.

In 2007, the Streaplers recorded the song in Norwegian for the album på norsk as "Til min kjeare."

At Dansbandskampen 2008 the song was performed by Susann Nordströms orkester, where the band singer Susann Nordström replaced the original refrain lines Vill du bli min egen kvinna? with Jag vill bli din egen kvinna.
