= Bo Strömstedt =

Swedish author and journalist (1929–2016)

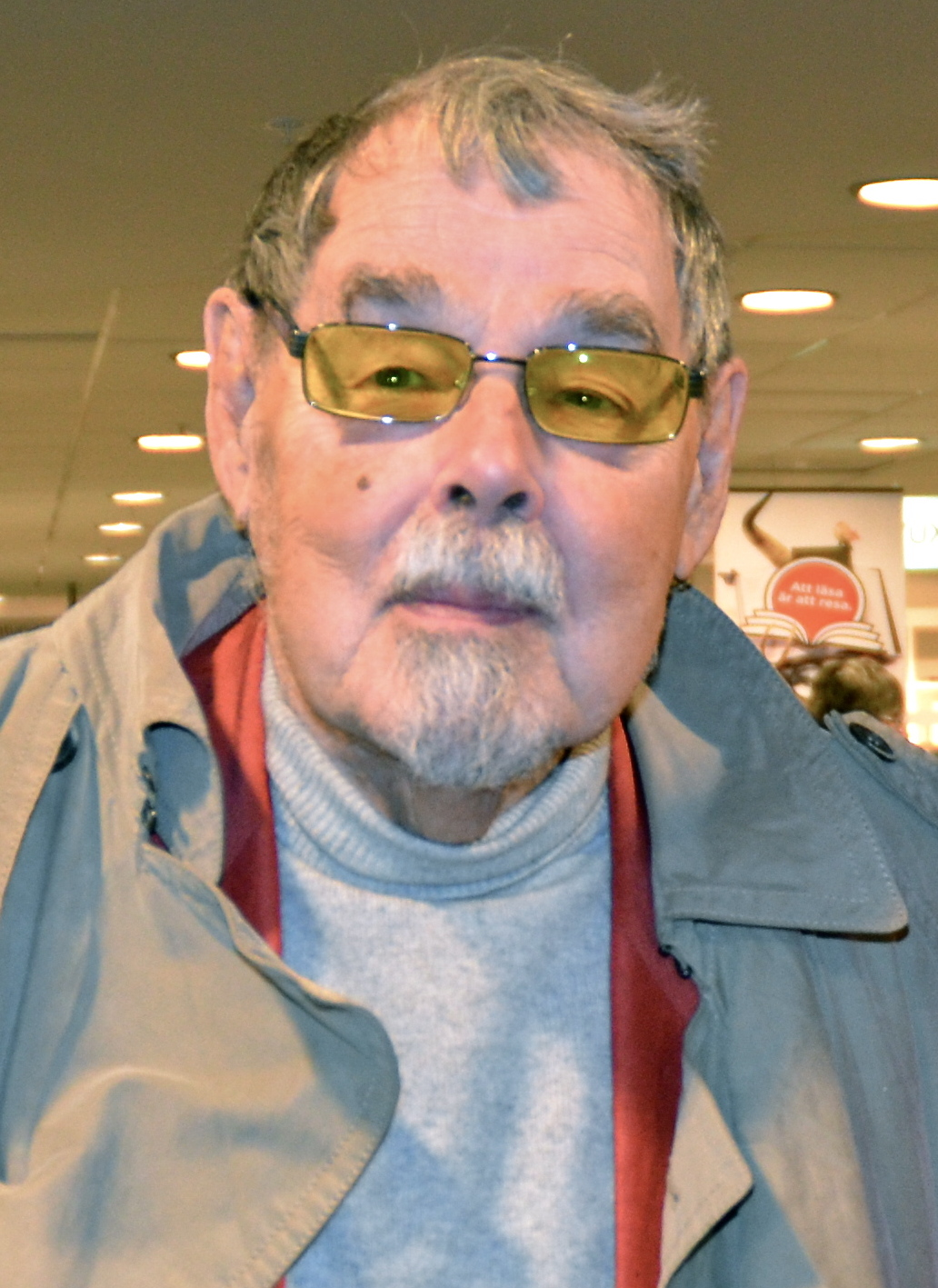
- Strömstedt in 2011
- Born: Bo Eugén Strömstedt; 4 May 1929; Vaasa, Finland
- Died: 24 June 2016 (aged 87); Stockholm, Sweden
- Occupations: Author; journalist
- Spouse: Margareta Strömstedt (m. 1953)
- Children: 2, including Niklas

Bo Eugén Strömstedt (4 May 1929 – 24 June 2016) was a Swedish author and journalist.

== Biography ==
Strömstedt was born on 4 May 1929 in Vaasa, Finland, to Harald (1899–1971) and Hildur Strömstedt (née Helin; 1898–1974). His father worked as a pastor and was educated in Vaasa. Strömstedt's mother was born in Föglö in Åland.

He attended Lund University, where he received a Bachelor of Arts in 1950. Strömstedt became a literary critic for Expressen in 1952. In 1961, he became head of the newspaper's cultural editorial office. In 1976, Strömstedt succeeded Per Wrigstad as editor-in-chief for Expressen. From 1992 until 1993, he was a professor of journalism at the University of Gothenburg. He served as a board member at Dagens Nyheter between 1977 and 1986, and at Tidnings AB Marieberg from 1986 to 1992.

== Personal life ==
Strömstedt married Margareta Strömstedt in 1953. The couple had two children: Niklas (b. 1958) and Lotten (b. 1962). He died on 24 June 2016, at the age of 87.

== Bibliography ==
- Strömstedt, Bo; Jonsson, Sune (1994). Löpsedeln och insidan: en bok om tidningen och livet (in Swedish). Stockholm: Bonnier. ISBN 9100554324.
- Strömstedt, Bo (1998). Den tjugonionde bokstaven (in Swedish). Bonnier. ISBN 9100566756.
