= Va' har du under blusen, Rut? =

Single by Lennart Witoslaw
- A-side: "Va' har du under blusen, Rut?"
- B-side: "Porriga Billy"
- Released: 1973
- Songwriter: Lennart Witoslaw

Va' har du under blusen, Rut? is a song written by Lennart Witoslaw (born 1950), and originally recorded by him releasing it as 1973 single with Porriga Billy acting as B-side. The song was also recorded by Schytts, releasing it as a 1974 single with En annan stad, en annan vän ("Another Town, Another Train") acting as B-side. and in 1974 it was also recorded by Stefan Rüdén, Tre blå, Winners and Zenits.

The song was also recorded by the Streaplers for the 1973 album Alltid på väg, also releasing it as a single 1974 and their version also charted at Svensktoppen for six weeks between 17 March-21 April 1974, peaking at fifth position.

In 1975, the song was recorded by the musician Nils Dacke on the album Nils Dacke spelar partyorgel. It was also recorded in 1975 by Lasse Green.

In 1995, the song was recorded by Flintstens med Stanley on the album Stenhårda låtar 1.

At Dansbandskampen 2008, the song was performed by Zlips.
