= Som stormen river öppet hav =

Single by Susanne Alfvengren & Mikael Rickfors
- Released: 1986
- Genre: pop
- Label: Hawk
- Songwriters: Susanne Alfvengren, Ulf Wahlberg

"Som stormen river öppet hav" is a song written by Susanne Alfvengren and Ulf Wahlberg, and recorded as a duet by Susanne Alfvengren and Mikael Rickfors. It was released as a single in 1986 for the 1987 Swedish film A Film About Love, with the song "Om kärlek" as the B-side. The single peaked at number three on the Swedish Singles Chart. It also charted at Svensktoppen for 29 weeks between 25 January to 25 October 1987.

== Other recordings ==
In 2002, the song was recorded by Jeanette Köhn and Loa Falkman on the album Det vackraste and in 2005 by Munkarna on the album 1:a kapitlet.

The song has also been recorded in other languages, a 2006 Shonentai version in Japanese was recorded for a musical.

== Charts ==
Chart (1987)	Peak position
Sweden (Sverigetopplistan)	3
