= Who's Gonna Follow You Home? =

Single by Jerry Williams

from the album Jerry Williams live på Börsen
- Language: English
- B-side: "When Your Heartache is over"
- Released: 1990
- Genre: rock
- Songwriter(s): Norell Oson Bard

Jerry Williams singles chronology
"Jerry Williams"	"Who's Gonna Follow You Home?"

"Who's Gonna Follow You Home?" is a song written by Norell Oson Bard and performed by Swedish singer Jerry Williams on the 1990 album Jerry Williams live på Börsen, released as a single in 1990.

== Cover versions ==
A Swedish-language version, with lyrics by Keith Almgren, called "Vem får följa dig hem" (eng. "Who's gonna follow you home") has been recorded by Shanes for the 1990 album "60-talsparty Let's Dance 1" as well as released as a single that year, and covered by Mats Bergmans (on the 1991 album Mats Bergmans), Grönwalls (on the 1993 album Waikiki Beach), and Matz Bladhs.

Shanes scored a Svensktoppen hit with the song, charting for 44 weeks between 28 October 1990 and 10 November 1991.

== Chart positions ==
Chart (1990)	Peak position
Sweden (Sverigetopplistan)	4
