= Max Lorenz =

Max Lorenz may refer to:

- Max Lorenz (tenor) (1901–1975), German operatic tenor
- Max Lorenz (footballer) (1939–2025), German footballer
- Max O. Lorenz (1876–1959), American economist, responsible for the Lorenz curve

== See also ==
- Max Lorentz (born 1962), Swedish musician
