= Tom & Mick =

Swedish band (1965–1968)

Tom & Mick & Maniacs
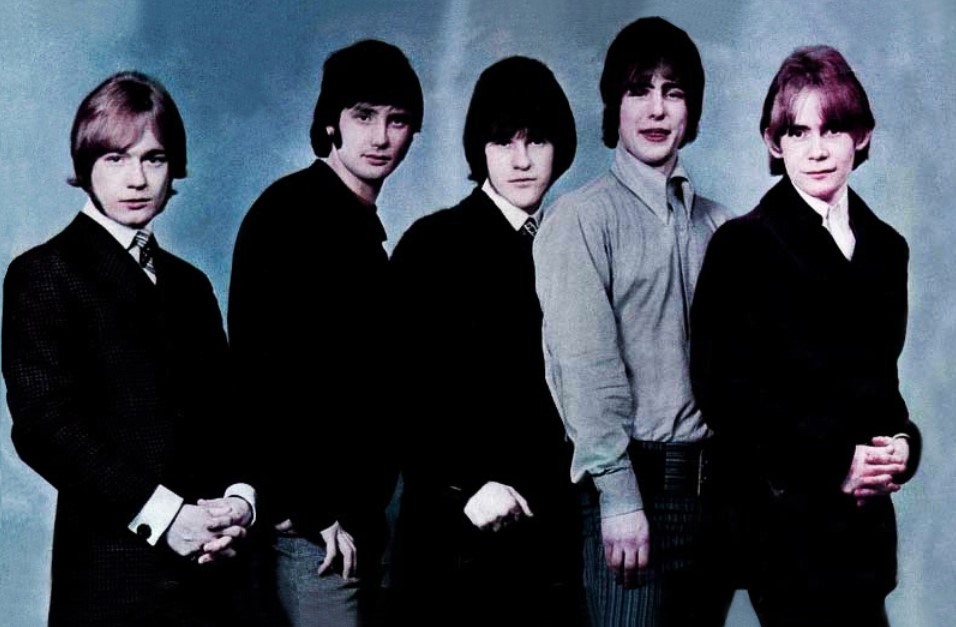
- The Maniacs in 1966, left to right: Bernt Liljegren, Christer Jarlstrand, Tommy Körberg, Leif Gyllander and Örjan Englund

Background information
- Also known as: Tom & Mick; The Maniacs; The Bootleggers
- Origin: Enköping, Sweden
- Genres: Soul pop; R&B
- Years active: 1965–1968
- Labels: Columbia; Sonet
- Past members: Tommy Körberg; Michael Johansson; Örjan Englund; Lasse Englund; Leif Gyllander; Bo Gyllander; Christer Jarlstrand; Bernt Liljegren; Gunnar Kullenberg; Ingvald Waldenström; Lars Norberg; Stephan Möller; Johnny Lundin

Tom & Mick (also known as Tom & Mick & Maniacs or simply The Maniacs) were a Swedish band formed in 1965 in Enköping, Sweden. They were only active for three years though managed to release an album and a handful of singles, of which "Please, Please, Please" became their first hit. During their last two active years, they were fronted by Tommy Körberg (Tom) and Michael Johansson (Mick), one of the first dual-vocalist pop groups in Sweden at the time Retrospectively, they are best known for their single "Somebody's Taken Maria Away" which topped the Swedish charts, and for starting the career of Körberg, who would go on to become one of the most well known musicians in Sweden.

== History ==
=== Early years (1965–66) ===
The Maniacs were initially formed in Enköping, Sweden under the name the Bootleggers by two sibling pairs, Örjan and Lasse Englund (both on guitars) along with Leif and Bo Gyllander (bass and drums respectively). The group was initially very popular, having won a contest in the town's folkpark which brought them to some level of fame in Enköping. At the same time elsewhere in the town, a young Tommy Körberg had gained attention for his voice, which was influenced by the likes of the Pretty Things, Tom Jones and Engelbert Humperdinck. At Bålstadsskolan, a school in the town, the Bootleggers and Körberg linked up for the first time, performing for four and a half hours in front of the school's students. As a result, Körberg was almost immediately asked to join the band, who were now pursuing a dream in music-full time.

Their second biggest break came in 1966, in which they participated in Sveriges Radios Popbandstävling ("Sweden Radio's Pop Group Contest") in which, a slight part due to Körbergs voice, the group ended up in second place after Slam Creepers', who were fronted by Björn Skifs, who later would work on the stage with Körberg. However, soon after the contest, guitarist Lasse Englund quit the band and was replaced by Ingvar Waldenström. With the success in the contest, Benny Englund, a producer and manager in Stockholm, took a note of their performance and as a result persuaded the band to move to Stockholm, gaining them a contract with Columbia Records; this label would release almost all of their future music. Additionally, Englund became their manager which would have an influence on their career.

In November 1966, the Maniacs recorded and released their debut single, a cover of the Beach Boys "Don't Worry Baby", backed by "Somebody To Care" Despite promising reviews of the single, it failed to chart on both Tio i Topp and sales chart Kvällstoppen. Additionally around December of that year, drummer Bo Gyllander quit the band due to the mandatory military conscription Sweden had at the time. He was replaced by Christer Jarlstrand.

=== Success and introduction of Michael Johansson (1967) ===
As the follow-up to the failure of "Don't Worry Baby", the Maniacs recorded a version of James Brown's "Please, Please, Please" in 1967, which featured a strong emphasis on Körberg's vocals, including him crying at the end of the song. Recorded in February 1967, It was released shortly after, backed by "Visions". It proved to be the Maniacs first big hit in Sweden, reaching number 5 on Tio i Topp while selling well enough to reach number 12 on Kvällstoppen in April of that year. It was shortly followed by a performance on Sveriges Television, which made Körberg into a household name in Sweden. However, adding to the instability of the group's lineup, Ingvar Waldenström was replaced by Bernt Liljegren. The follow-up to the hit was recorded on 25 April 1967 at EMI Studios in Stockholm. It was a cover of Baker Knight's "Never Be Anyone Else But You", which was released in May of that year. It flopped, failing to chart on either Tio i Topp or Kvällstoppen, prompting Örjan Englund to leave the band; he was replaced by Gunnar Kullenberg.

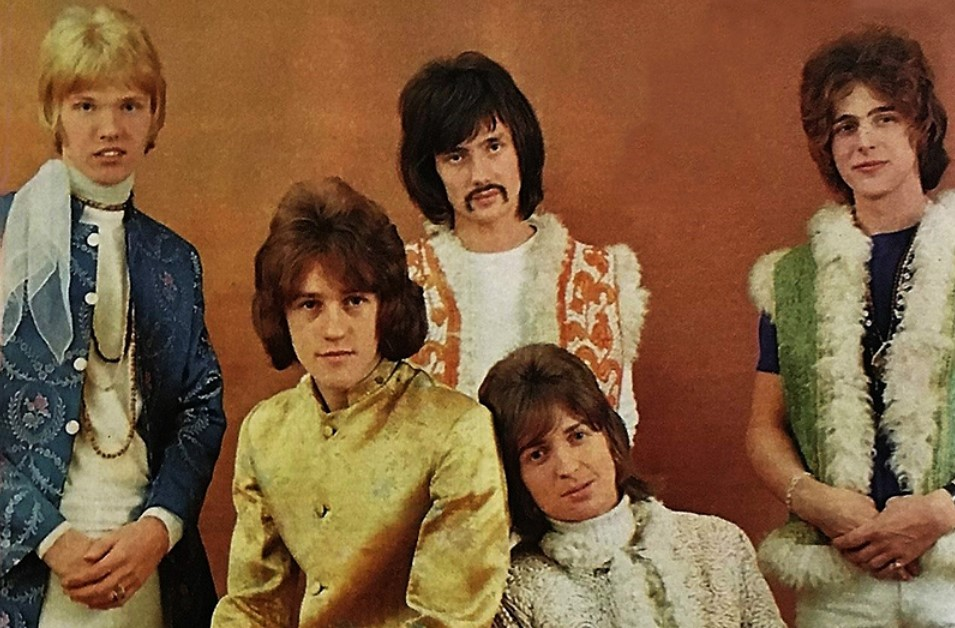
Tom & Mick & Maniacs in 1967, following the introduction of Michael Johansson

During that time, their manager Benny Englund had started taking interest in vocal soul duos, specifically Sam & Dave and the Righteous Brothers, having an ambition to create a similar act in Sweden. During that summer, singer Michael Johansson from the group Playmates auditioned to join the group; his vocal skills and talent were duly noted by the band and he was quickly adapted as the group's second lead singer. Additionally, the group re-branded themselves as Tom & Mick & Maniacs as a nod to Sam & Dave; this resulted in dismay from the rest of the Maniacs, who despite being entirely competent and professional band became a backing group for Körberg and Johansson, which resulted in some internal clashes.

On 18 July 1967, shortly after Johansson was introduced as a member of the group, they entered Europafilm Studios together with producer Anders Henriksson, who at the time was best known for his work in Swedish groups the Shanes and Tages. They recorded the single "Somebody's Taken Maria Away" along with what eventually became the B-side, "I Got The Feelin'". The recording was backed by Lasse Samuelssons orkester who would go on to back the group on most of their subsequent recordings. Released as a single in August 1967, the song managed to reach number one on Tio i Topp for six weeks straight during the autumn of that year, spiralling Johansson into the spotlight and made him a pop-star in Sweden. It was one of the most successful singles on Tio i Topp throughout that show's history.

=== Album and break-up (1967–68) ===
In December 1967, Tom & Mick & Maniacs would release their only album, Tom & Mick Maniacs, which met commercial and critical acclaim by critics. It was largely made up of soul and pop covers, including the Isaac Hayes and David Porter composition "You Don't Know Like I Know", one of the earliest covers of Neil Diamond's "Red Red Wine" along with Del Shannon's "I Never Loved A Girl". at the time, the album was one of the most financially expensive musical projects undertaken in Sweden at the time, which also caused some controversy in the group as producer Anders Henriksson opted for using session musicians for the songs rather than the Maniacs. This led to several conflicts in which all the group's musicians left the band or were fired; instead Lars Norberg (bass), Stephan Möller (drums) and Johnny Lundin (guitar) joined as the group's backing musicians. "I Who Have Nothing", which had appeared on the album, was extracted as a single in February 1968; backed by the original composition "Pandemonium", it reached number 8 on Tio i Topp, proving to be their final hit on the chart.

By this time, the band had removed the Maniacs-suffix, simply becoming Tom & Mick. This was largely due to the fact that most of the group's fans came to see the front figures Körberg and Johansson, leaving the Maniacs out of the spotlight. At the same time, their contract with Columbia expired, prompting Englund to sign them with Sonet Records that spring; on this label, the group recorded one single, "24 Hours from Tulsa", which was released in April of that year, but failed to reach Tio i Topp or Kvällstoppen. It was their first chart failure following almost a year straight of hit singles, prompting the Johansson and Körberg to end up in conflict. Shortly after the release of the single, the Maniacs were dropped entirely from the band, with the band instead opting for a big band backing; this proved to be a failure, not lasting long. During a concert that summer together with Lasse Samuelssons orkester, the band broke-up due to the instabilities in its line-up.

Concurrently with Tom & Mick, former members, disgruntled after leaving or being fired from the band became the Nashmen who broke up in 1969. Following his tenure with Tom & Mick, Körberg opted for a solo career, which would go on to become one of the most successful in Swedish history. Johansson on the other hand, joined the band Michael Salt & Peppar, who toured the United Kingdom, the United States and Mexico, but did not see any major success with this group. In the mid-1970s, fed up with being a pop-star, Johansson moved to Valbo and became a music teacher at a local school. Founder Örjan Englund also saw a relatively successful career following his tenure with the Maniacs, running his own record label and worked with several groups during the 1970s. Guitarist Bernt Liljegren would play with a reformed incarnation of the Hep Stars.

== Discography ==
=== Album ===
Title	Details
Tom & Mick Maniacs	Released: December 1967; Label: Columbia (SSX 1029); Split album with the Sunspots

=== Compilations ===
Title	Details
Somebody's Taken Maria Away	Released: 1970; Label: Sonet (GP-9968)
Tom Mick & Maniacs	Released: 2013; Label: Riverside (RRCD 149)

=== Singles ===
Title	Year	Peak chart positions	
Title	Year	Tio i Topp	Kvällstoppen
As the Maniacs
"Don't Worry Baby" / "Someone to Care"	1966	—	—
"Please, Please, Please" / "Visions"	1967	5	12
"Never Be Anyone Else But You" / "That's Why I'm Crying"	1967	—	—
As Tom & Mick & Maniacs
"Somebody's Taken Maria Away" / "I Got the Feelin'"	1967	1	1
"Can I Get To Know You Better" / "Free"	1967	15	—
"I Who Have Nothing" / "Pandemonium"	1968	8	—
As Tom & Mick
"24 Hours from Tulsa" / "Koko Joe"	1968	—	—
"—" denotes releases that did not chart.
