= Did I Tell You =

Did I Tell You may refer to:

- "Did I Tell You" (The Jerry Williams song), 1989
- "Did I Tell You" (The Spinto Band song), 2005
