= Triad (band) =

Swedish pop band (1987–1988)

- Origin: Sweden
- Genres: Rock; pop
- Years active: 1987–1988
- Labels: EMI
- Past members: Lasse Lindbom; Niklas Strömstedt; Janne Bark

Triad was a Swedish rock band that comprised Lasse Lindbom, Niklas Strömstedt and Janne Bark. Triad is most famous for their 1987-1988 Swedish number-one single hit "Tänd ett ljus" ("Light a Candle"), one of the Swedish classic songs for the Advent season, just prior to Christmas. The outro includes Christmas and New Year's greetings in different languages. The single topped the Swedish singles chart on 6 January 1988. The song charted at Svensktoppen for eight weeks during the period 20 December 1987 – 14 February 1988. It has been subject to many cover versions.

The band was formed by three music friends. Janne Bark played the guitar, Lasse Lindbom of the Lasse Lindbom Band was bassist and producer, and guitarist Janne Bark and Niklas Strömstedt played the piano. All three were vocalists.

The only album of the band, the self-titled Triad, didn't prove successful, reaching only number 44 in the Swedish Albums Chart in May 1988. Soon after Triad disbanded. Niklas Strömstedt went on to have a successful solo music career for many years.

Triad reunited for a gig for Sveriges Television (SVT)'s sing-along show Allsång på Skansen on 16 August 2011.

== Discography ==
- Triad (1988)
