= Svensktoppen =

Swedish music chart

- Genre: Record chart
- Country of origin: Sweden
- Language: Swedish
- Home station: SR P4
- Original release: 13 October 1962

Svensktoppen (Swedish: [ˈsvɛ̂nːskˌtɔpːɛn]) is a weekly record chart airing on Sveriges Radio. Until January 2003, the songs had to be in the Swedish language. Svensktoppen has aired since 1962, except for the years 1982–1985. In the years leading up to the January 2003 change, the programme was strongly dominated by dansband music.

The first number-one hit song was "Midnattstango" performed by Swedish crooner Lars Lönndahl.

New rules on 17 January 2016 restricted the maximum length for a song to chart to one year.

== Presenters ==
Years	Name
1962 – 1963	Barbro Lindström
1963	Carl-Uno Sjöblom
1963	Magnus Banck
1964 – 1965	Torbjörn Johnsson
1965	Gert Landin
1965	Bengteric Nordell
1966	Jörgen Cederberg
1966 – 1973	Ulf Elfving
1973 – 1975	Kent Finell
1975 – 1976	Kersti Adams-Ray
1976	Pekka Langer
1976	Alicia Lundberg
1977	Sven Lindahl
1977	Pekka Langer
1977	Gert Landin
1978	Arne Weise
1978	Pekka Langer
1978	Åke Strömmer
1979	Pekka Langer
1979	Gert Landin
1979 – 1980	Kent Finell
1980	Kersti Adams-Ray
1980 – 1981	Lasse Lönndahl
1981	Janne Önnerud
1981	Östen Warnerbring
1982 – 13 June 1982	Eddie Bruhner
20 June 1982 – 6 October 1985	No shows
13 October 1985 – 1986	Jan-Erik Lundén
1986 – 1987	Janne Önnerud
1987 – 2002	Kent Finell
2003 – 19 August 2007	Annika Jankell
26 August 2007 – present	Carolina Norén

== Winners ==
Year	Song	Artist
1962	"Regniga natt"	Anna–Lena Löfgren
1963	"Spel-Olles gånglåt"	Trio me´Bumba
1964	"Trettifyran" (Swedish version of "This Ole House")	Per Myrberg
1965	"Mest av allt" (I Love You Because)	Gunnar Wiklund
1966	"En sommardröm"	Östen Warnerbring
1967	"En sång en gång för längesen" ("Green, Green Grass of Home")	Jan Malmsjö
1968	"Vi ska gå hand i hand"	Gunnar Wiklund
1969	"Man ska leva för varandra"	Trio me´Bumba
1970	"En enkel sång om frihet"	Lasse Berghagen
1971	"Är det konstigt att man längtar bort nån gång"	Lena Andersson
1972	"Änglamark"	Sven-Bertil Taube
1973	"Omkring tiggarn från Luossa"	Hootenanny Singers
1974	"Waterloo"	ABBA
1975	"Du gav bara löften"	Vikingarna
1976	"Fernando"	Anni-Frid Lyngstad
1977	"Roslagens vind"	Kjell Hansson
1978	"Låt inte din skugga falla här" (also "Don't Darken My Doorstep"	Ann-Louise Hanson
1979	"Djingis Khan"	Vikingarna
1980	"Sången skall klinga"	Kikki Danielsson
1981	"Santa Maria"	Sten & Stanley/Sten Nilsson
1982	"Dag efter dag"	Chips
1985	"Svindlande affärer"	Pernilla Wahlgren
1986	"Dover–Calais"	"Style"
1987	"Som stormen river öppet hav"	Susanne Alfvengren & Mikael Rickfors
1988	"Allt som jag känner"	Tommy Nilsson & Tone Norum
1989	"De sista ljuva åren"	Lasse Stefanz & Christina Lindberg
1990	"Hon har blommor i sitt hår"	Anders Glenmark
1991	"Vem får följa dig hem?"	Shanes
1992	"Två mörka ögon"	Sven-Ingvars
1993	"We Are All the Winners	Nick Borgens orkester
1994	"Öppna din dörr"	Tommy Nilsson
1995	"Se på mig"	Jan Johansen
1996	"Till min kära"	Streaplers
1997	"Guldet blev till sand"	Peter Jöback
1998	"Guldet blev till sand"	Peter Jöback
1999	"Farväl till släkt och vänner"	Björn Afzelius
2000	"Här kommer kärleken"	Idolerna
2001	"Av längtan till dig"	Åsa Jinder & CajsaStina Åkerström
2002	"Kom och ta mig"	Brandsta City Släckers
2003	"Här kommer alla känslorna (på en och samma gång)"	Per Gessle
2004	"Håll mitt hjärta"	Björn Skifs
2005	"Du är min man"	Benny Anderssons Orkester with Helen Sjöholm
2006	"Du är min man"	Benny Anderssons Orkester with Helen Sjöholm
2007	"För att du finns"	Sonja Aldén
2008	"Empty Room"	Sanna Nielsen
2009	"Om du lämnade mig nu"	Lars Winnerbäck & Miss Li
2010	"I Did It for Love"	Jessica Andersson
2011	"I Did It for Love"	Jessica Andersson
2012	"Some Die Young"	Laleh
2013	"Strövtåg i hembygden"	Mando Diao
2014	"Strövtåg i hembygden"	Mando Diao
2015	"Strövtåg i hembygden"	Mando Diao
2016	"Ett sista glas" (known as "The Parting Glass")	Miriam Bryant
2017	"Hold on"	Nano
2018	"Fireworks"	First Aid Kit
2019	"Tillfälligheter"	Veronica Maggio
2020	"Svag"	Victor Leksell
2021	"Tystnar i luren"	Miriam Bryant & Victor Leksell
2022	"X"	Miss Li
2023	"Tattoo"	Loreen
2024	"Misstag"	Miss Li

== See also ==
- Sverigetopplistan, today's official sales-based Swedish record chart
