= Did I Tell You (Jerry Williams song) =

1988 single by Jerry Williams

Single by Jerry Williams

from the album JW
- B-side: "Let's Do Some Rock 'n' Roll"
- Released: 1988
- Genre: Rock; pop
- Length: 4:14
- Label: Sonet
- Songwriter(s): Gavin Povey
- Producer(s): Anders Hansson; Ola Håkansson; Mats A. Lindberg

Jerry Williams singles chronology
"It Keeps Rainin'" (1987)	"Did I Tell You" (1988)	"It Started with a Love Affair" (1989)

Audio
- "Did I Tell You" on YouTube

"Did I Tell You" is a 1988 song written by Gavin Povey and Augie Meyers and sung by the Swedish singer Jerry Williams. The song also appeared on Williams' 1989 album JW. The song topped Sverigetopplistan, the official Swedish Singles Chart staying at number 1 for 3 consecutive weeks in February and March 1989. It's his only number one single as a solo artist.

== Track listing and formats ==
- Swedish 7-inch single

A. "Did I Tell You" – 4:14
B. "Let's Do Some Rock 'n' Roll" – 3:42

== Credits and personnel ==
- Jerry Williams – vocals
- Gavin Povey – songwriter
- Anders Hansson – producer, engineering, mixing
- Ola Håkansson – producer, mixing
- Mats A. Lindberg – producer, engineering
- Per Adebratt – engineering
- Sofia Eklöf – cover art, photographer
- Beatrice Uusma – cover art designer

Credits and personnel adapted from the JW album and 7-inch single liner notes.

== Charts ==
Weekly chart performance for "Did I Tell You"
Chart (1989)	Peak position
Sweden (Sverigetopplistan)	1

== Certifications ==
Certifications for "Did I Tell You"
Region	Certification	Certified units/sales
Sweden (GLF)	Platinum	50,000^{^}
^{^} Shipments figures based on certification alone.
