= Man ska leva för varandra =

1968 single by Trio me' Bumba

Single by Trio me' Bumba

from the album De' e' så kul!
- Language: Swedish
- B-side: "De' e' så kul"
- Released: 1968
- Label: Columbia
- Songwriter: Bengt Sundström

Trio me' Bumba singles chronology
"Då leker livet / Öppna ditt fönster" (1968)	"Man ska leva för varandra" (1968)	"Om du vill ha mej får du ta mej som jag e' / Jag vill ge" (1969)

Man ska leva för varandra is a song written by Bengt Sundström, and recorded by Trio me' Bumba, releasing it as a single in September 1968, and charted at Svensktoppen for 26 weeks between 26 May-16 November 1969, which included the song topping the chart

A Jan Sparring recording from his 1981 album Jan Sparring sjunger country charted at Svensktoppen for two weeks between 12–19 April 1981, peaking at 9th position.

The song was later recorded by Berth Idoffs in 1986.
