= Margareta Strömstedt =

Swedish author (1931–2023)

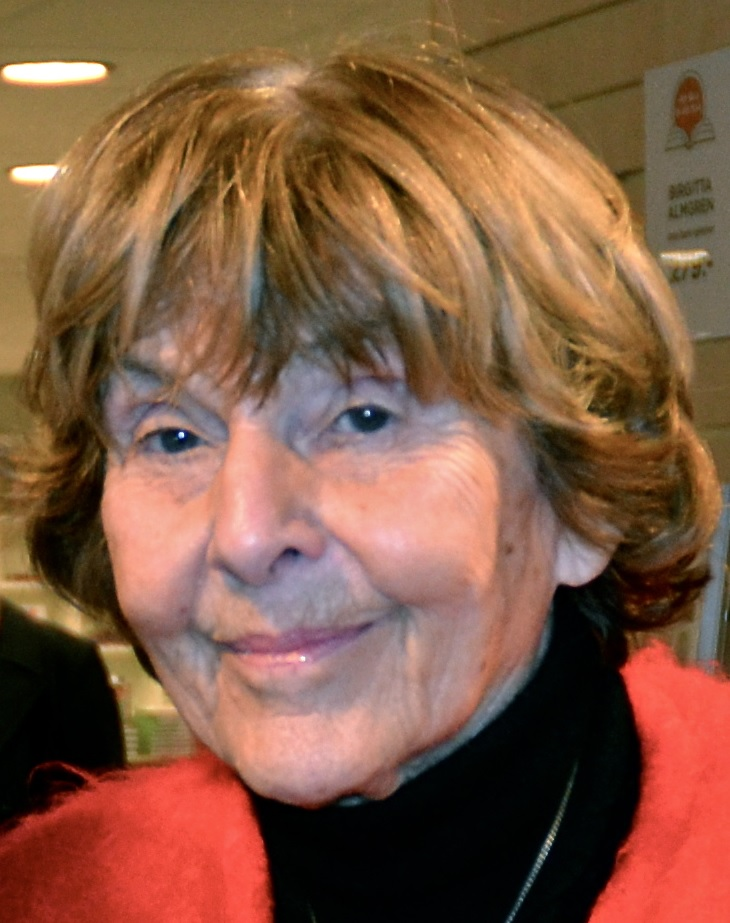
- Strömstedt in 2011
- Born: Gunhild Margareta Henriksson; 19 May 1931; Ljungby, Sweden
- Died: 28 March 2023 (aged 91); Stockholm, Sweden
- Occupations: Author; journalist; translator
- Spouse: Bo Strömstedt (m. 1953; died 2016)
- Children: 2, including Niklas
- Writing career
- Period: 1961–2023

Gunhild Margareta Strömstedt (née Henriksson; 19 May 1931 − 28 March 2023) was a Swedish author, journalist and translator.

== Family and education ==
Strömstedt was born in Ljungby on 19 May 1931, to August Henriksson, a Free Church minister, and Sigrid Bergma. She qualified as a teacher in Lund before continuing her university studies, graduating in 1956.

In 1953 she married the publisher Bo Strömstedt (1929–2016). She was the mother of the musician Niklas Strömstedt and the journalist Lotten Strömstedt.

== Career ==
In the 1960s Strömstedt worked as a children's theatre critic for the newspaper Dagens Nyheter. In 1969 she trained with the broadcaster Sveriges Radio, and worked as a producer there until 1985.

Strömstedt's debut work for children, Fjärilar i klassen, was published in 1961, followed in 1962 by Kom tillbaka, lilla Jenny!. Her major breakthrough was in 1982 with the publication of the first book in a prize-winning series about a girl called Majken (Majken, den nittonde december). She also wrote books for adults, her first, the autobiographical novel Julstädningen och döden, appearing in 1980. Many of her works reflected an interest in child welfare.

She also wrote a biography of Astrid Lindgren, published in 1977.

== Recognition and later life ==
Strömstedt was awarded the Gulliver Prize in 1969 and was also the recipient of the Astrid Lindgren Prize on two occasions, in 1986 and 2002.

In 2007 she was awarded an honorary PhD from Linnaeus University.

Strömstedt's final work, Jag skulle så gärna vilja förföra dig – men jag orkar inte, was published in 2013. She died in Stockholm on 28 March 2023, at the age of 91.
