= Jerry Williams (singer) =

Swedish singer and actor (1942–2018)

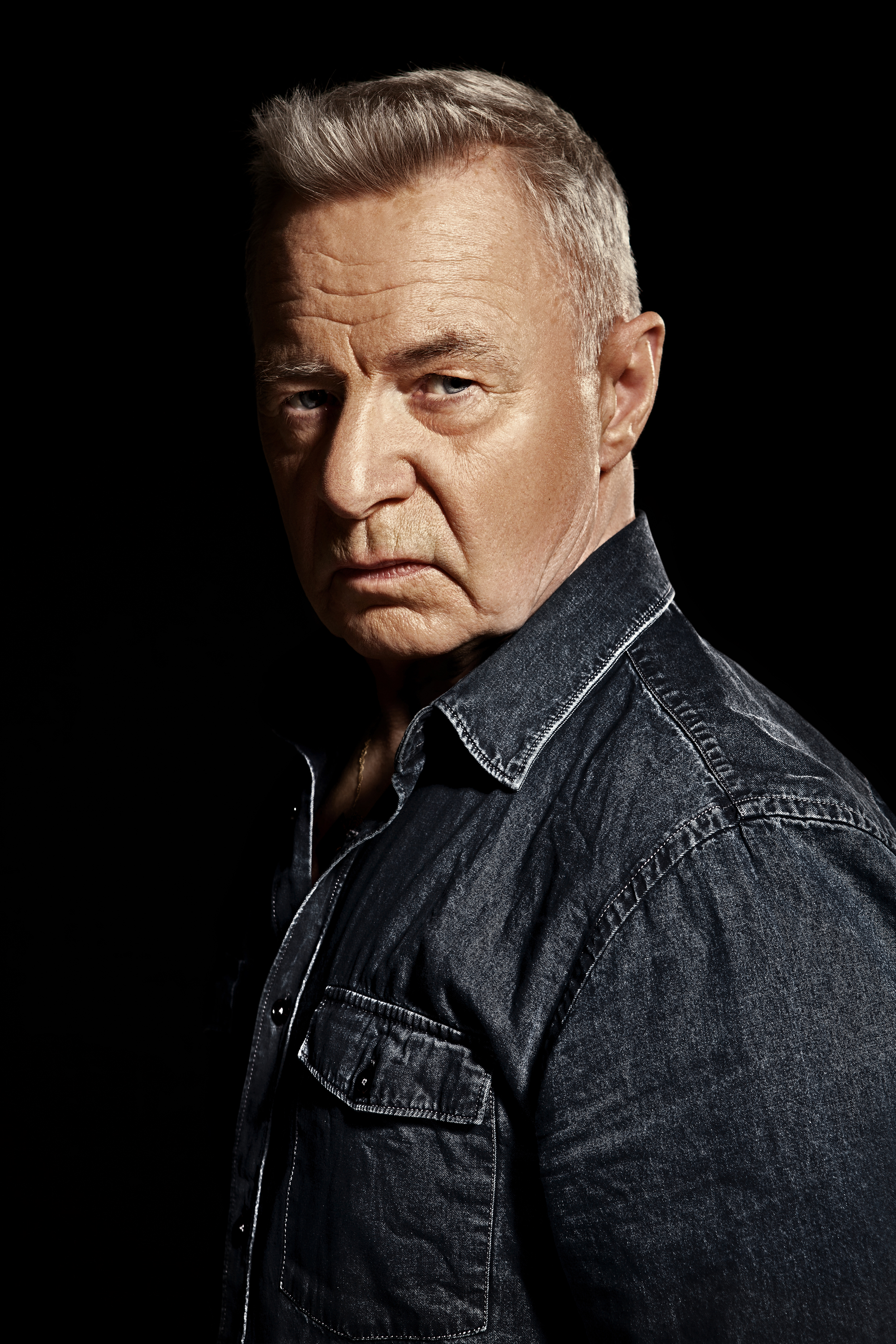
- Williams in 2012

Background information
- Born: Erik Sven Fernström; 15 April 1942; Solna, Sweden
- Died: 25 March 2018 (aged 75) Täby, Sweden
- Years active: 1962–2018
- Musical career
- Genres: Rock; rockabilly
- Instrument: Vocals
- Labels: Sunglasses, Sonet, Eurodisc
- Formerly of: The Violents; Roadwork

Erik Sven Fernström (15 April 1942 – 25 March 2018), known by his stage name Jerry Williams, was a Swedish singer and actor. He began his career as the lead singer of The Violents, before launching a solo career.

== Early life ==
Williams grew up in a working-class family in Solna. The family had a one-room apartment. Williams' mother, a nurse, died when he was only twelve years old. His father took care of him and his brother alone. He was very interested in sports, and as a youngster he played football, ice hockey and was engaged in cycle sport. He was also a member of Narva BK, a boxing club.

In his youth, Williams worked as a plumber. He did his mandatory military service in 1966.

== Career ==
In 1962, Williams joined The Violents, a Swedish band that was formed in 1959 influenced by the English instrumental guitar group The Shadows. The band had a number of line-up changes. But when Williams joined in 1962, he became frontman and the lead singer of the band. In 1962, Williams and the Violents released a version of "Darling Nelly Grey" as a single, which became a major hit in Sweden.

When Little Richard performed at the Star-Club in Hamburg in 1962, both Williams along with The Violents and The Beatles were opening acts. When The Beatles toured Sweden in 1963, Williams and The Violents were the opening act. The Violents folded in 1966. A single was released on Laurie Records #3339 in 1965 "The Wanderer" b/w "Runaround Sue", both hits for Dion in the U.S. a few years before.

In the 1960s, Williams recorded a track with English record producer Joe Meek. The track was called "The Wonder Of Your Love". It was never released and was found amongst Meek's tapes when he died. It can be heard on YouTube. Williams' music style was soul-influenced by the end of the 1960s, and the song "Keep On" became a hit in Sweden in 1969.

He returned to rock and roll-based music in the early 1970s and performed with the band Roadwork until the early 1980s. During the 1970s, he also toured with the band The Telstars. In 1983, Williams made his debut as an actor in the film G – som i gemenskap. He also acted in the musical "Cats.

In 1989, Williams released the song "Did I Tell You", which became his biggest hit, and the record JW which led to him being discovered by a new generation. A music video was also filmed for "Did I Tell You". During this time, Williams also had the stage show act "Live på Börsen" at Hamburger Börs in Stockholm. Williams followed it up with more shows such as Live 'n Jive at Hamburger Börs in 1999, Jerka at Stora Teatern in Gothenburg and Göta Lejon in Stockholm in 2002. As well as "Ringside" at Scalateatern in 2005, and Lorensbergsteatern in Gothenburg in 2006. In 1985, Williams was awarded a cultural award Swedish Trade Union Confederation, and in 1991 he was pictured on a Swedish stamp. In the Eurovision Song Contest of 1989, he was a part of the choir for the song "En dag" which was performed by Tommy Nilsson representing Sweden.

In 1986, he lost almost 2.9 million (SEK), reportedly as a result of mismanagement of funds by his financial advisor. Williams was a host for Sommar i P1 on Sveriges Radio on 5 August 2009. In 2010, an art project featuring his work was exhibited at Göteborgs Konsthall in Gothenburg. In 2009 and 2010 he had the show Dynamite at Rondo in Gothenburg and Tyrol in Stockholm. He performed on the popular TV show Allsång på Skansen on several occasions.

On 17 January 2013, Williams premiered his farewell tour Jerry – The Farewell Show at Cirkus in Stockholm. Over 100,000 tickets were sold for the entire pan-Sweden tour for most of 2013.

Also in 2013, Williams co-operated with opera singer Malena Ernman on the latter's album I decembertid. He sang "Counting Miracles", the opening track of the album as a duet with Ernman. The song charted at Svensktoppen, and placed as number one on 6 April 2014.

== Language ==
One of Williams' trademarks was the unique language and speech pattern he used throughout his life. It was a kind of sociolect based on old Stockholm dialects and slang, mixed with words and expressions used by touring musicians, notably smaller bands touring by bus. He also invented words, metaphors and expressions of his own; some of which would filter out and become part of the Swedish way of talking. Sometimes when he appeared on national TV, the broadcast company would subtitle the program in Standard Swedish.

== Personal life ==
Williams was a lifelong communist. Off stage he led a very private life with his family, dogs and training. He was an AIK supporter.

Williams had been married since 1977, and had two daughters from that marriage. Before getting married he was a single father with a son. He lived in Täby at the time of his death. Williams died from cancer in Täby on 25 March 2018, aged 75.

== Discography ==
=== Studio albums ===
Year	Album	Peak positions
Year	Album	SWE
1963	Jerry 21	-
1963	Mr. Dynamite	-
1964	More Dynamite	-
1964	At the Star-Club	-
1965	Mr. Dynamite Explodes Again	-
1966	Action	-
1968	Power of Soul	-
1969	Dr. Williams & Mr. Dynamite	-
1970	Leader of the Pack	-
1971	Whole Lotta Shakin' Going On	-
1972	Money	-
1973	Keep On	-
1974	Sweet Little Rock 'n' Roller	-
1976	Kick Down	45
1977	Too Fast to Live – Too Young to Die	–
1979	I Can Jive	12
1980	Hot Rock 'n' Roll Band	–
1981	No Creases	48
1982	God Bless Rock 'n' Roll	46
1983	2 Faces	43
1984	Working Class Hero	–
1987	One and One	44
1989	JW	3
1993	Jerry Williams	13
1996	Keep On Rollin'	16
1998	Kung i blodet	11
2000	Can't Slow Down	6
2002	Sweet Sixty	16
2011	Alright	5
2013	Keep On	18
2015	Ghost Rider	4

=== Live albums ===
Year	Album	Peak positions
Year	Album	SWE
1990	Live på Börsen	7
1990	Golden Hits Live	59
2009	Dynamite – Live	16
2018	Man måste få lira (Live på Scalateatern / 2016)	44

=== Compilation albums ===
Year	Album	Peak positions
Year	Album	SWE
1999	Jerry Williams Greatest Hits	2
2007	I Can Jive – Det bästa med Jerry Williams	4

=== Singles ===
Year	Single	Peak positions	Album
Year	Single	SWE	Album
1965	"The Wanderer"	Laurie 3339	
1989	"Did I Tell You"	1	
1989	"It Started With a Love Affair"	–	
1990	"Who's Gonna Follow You Home?"	4	
1991	"If You See Her" (Jerry Williams & The Boppers)	28	
1992	"Rock A Doddle"	31	
1993	"Goodbye Rolling Stones"	21	
1996	"Jackson"	45	
2005	"Ringside"	59	

== Filmography ==
=== Film ===
Year	Title	Role	Notes
1963	Åsa-Nisse och tjocka släkten	Clerk at the Music Store	
1967	Drra på – Kul grej på väg till Götet	Himself	
1983	G – som i gemenskap	Motorcyclist	
1985	On the Loose	Frasse	Short film
1987	Nionde kompaniet	Himself (uncredited)	
1991	Rock-a-Doodle	Chanticleer (Swedish voice)	
1996	Lilla Jönssonligan och cornflakeskuppen	Einar Vanheden	

=== Television ===
Year	Title	Role	Notes
1999	C/o Segemyhr	Himself	
2003	Håkan Bråkan	Himself	

== Bibliography ==
- Williams J.; Rehnberg B. (1992). Jerry: självbiografin. Norstedt. ISBN 9119192126.
