= Out on the Road (Hollies album) =

Studio album by The Hollies
- Released: June 1973
- Recorded: 2 January –15 March 1973
- Studios: EMI Studios, London
- Genres: Rock, pop
- Length: 40:03
- Label: Hansa Records / Ariola
- Producers: Ron Richards, The Hollies

The Hollies chronology
The Hollies' Greatest Hits (1972)	Out on the Road (1973)	Hollies (1974)

Out on the Road is the 13th album by the British band The Hollies and the second to feature Mikael Rickfors as lead singer. The song "Slow Down Go Down" was released as a single in Australia and became a Top 100 hit (No. 73). By the time the album was released in some European countries (Germany, Spain), the original singer Allan Clarke had returned to the band and the album was therefore not released in the UK and US. For this reason it is sometimes not listed in the official discography.

== Overview ==
The album was a follow-up to the successful Romany LP, which The Hollies had released with Mikael Rickfors in 1972. According to the recollections of drummer Bobby Elliott, the album was inspired by the band's frequent tours to the United States, where the Hollies' previous singles such as "Long Cool Woman in a Black Dress", "Long Dark Road" and "Magic Woman Touch" had a much greater impact than in the UK. All songs were written by members of the band (Kenny Lynch and Dean Ford also co-wrote some of them). The LP was recorded at Abbey Road Studios in London, with the band's long time producer Ron Richards and Peter Bown as the engineer of sound. In the spring of 1973, the album was announced in The Hollies Official Fan Club Newsletter and Bobby Elliott wrote short notes on each track but the album was later released only on Hansa Records in Germany and Ariola in Spain. The gatefold cover art of the LP, created by Colin Elgie of the Hipgnosis art team, was later reworked again for the cover of the Hollies' LP Another Night.

Out on the Road was not available in the UK until the release of the compilation CD box set "The Hollies – Changin' Times" in 2015. The only other country to re-release the album on CD was France (in 2006 on the Magic Records label). After the cancellation of the project and the return of lead singer Allan Clarke, the band re-recorded some of the songs for their next album, simply titled Hollies ("Transatlantic Westbound Jet", "Out on the Road"). The song "Pick up the Pieces Again" was used in the same version because Terry Sylvester sang the lead vocals and the track "I Was Born a Man" (sang by guitarist Tony Hicks) was released as the B side of the comeback single with Allan Clarke "The Day That Curly Billy Shot Down Crazy Sam McGee".

== Reception ==
Professional ratings
Review scores
Source	Rating
AllMusic	4.5/5 stars

In his AllMusic retrospective review of the release, Bruce Eder wrote, "The requisite Hollies harmonies are present as well on most of the material, and the body of songs is mostly very good - and mostly as distinctive as their other album cuts of this era."

== Track listing ==
Side one
No.	Title	Writer(s)	Length
1.	"Out On The Road"	Tony Hicks, Kenny Lynch	2:58
2.	"A Better Place"	Tony Hicks, Kenny Lynch	2:41
3.	"They Don't Realise I'm Down"	Terry Sylvester, Mikael Rickfors	4:32
4.	"The Last Wind"	Mikael Rickfors	3:41
5.	"Mr. Heartbreaker"	Terry Sylvester, Dean Ford*	3:32
6.	"I Was Born A Man"	Tony Hicks, Kenny Lynch	2:57

Side two
No.	Title	Writer(s)	Length
1.	"Slow Down - Go Down"	Tony Hicks, Kenny Lynch	3:55
2.	"Don't Leave The Child Alone"	Mikael Rickfors	2:46
3.	"Nearer To You"	Tony Hicks, Kenny Lynch	3:47
4.	"Pick Up The Pieces"	Terry Sylvester	3:55
5.	"Transatlantic Westbound Jet"	Terry Sylvester, Bobby Elliott	4:47

(*) Dean Ford was not credited on the original album cover.

== Personnel ==
=== The Hollies ===
- Mikael Rickfors – lead vocals, rhythm guitar, harmonica
- Tony Hicks – lead guitar, banjo, electric sitar, backing vocals
- Terry Sylvester – rhythm guitar, backing vocals
- Bernie Calvert – bass guitar, keyboards
- Bobby Elliott – drums and percussion
