= Streaplers =

Swedish dansband

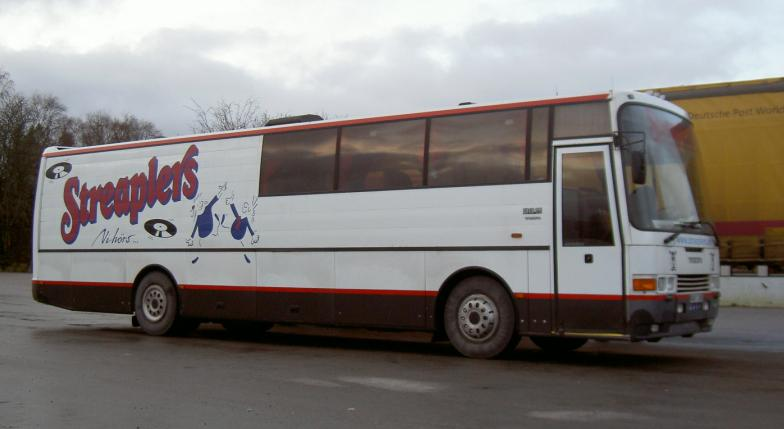
- Streaplers' tour bus

Background information
- Origin: Kungälv, Sweden
- Genres: Dansband; pop
- Years active: 1959–present
- Members: Kenny Samuelsson (1997-present); Håkan Liljeblad (1959-present); Kjetil Granli (1990-present); Anders Larsson (2004-present)
- Past members: Mats Alfredsson (1959-1963); Gert Gert Lengstrand (1959-1966); Bjarne Lundqvist (1963-1988); Robert Löfvendahl (1966-1970); Ove Pilebo (1970-1984); Towe Wideberg (1984-1990); Kent Szwonder (1988-????); Bosse Möllberg (1990-1997); Lars Larsson (1995-2004); Jörgen Flach (2003-2003)

Streaplers is a Swedish musical group, founded 1959 in Kungälv as a pop group and later developed into a dansband. Original members were Gert Lengstrand (vocals), Bjarne Lundquist, Göran Liljeblad, Håkan Liljeblad och Lars Larsson.

The group made a breakthrough with Säkkijärven Polka in 1963. Hit songs such as Diggety Doggety, "Mule Skinner Blues" and Rockin' Robin followed. Singer Gert Lengstrand left the group in 1966, and was replaced by Curt Borkman. Since then the band began development towards playing dansband music. Robert Löfvendahl became the new singer in 1969. The same year, the band had a Svensktoppen number one hit with "Tusen öars land". In 1970, Ove Pilebo began as singer and Streaplers became one of Sweden's most popular dansbands, with 225 concerts. As a dansband, they had many Svensktoppen hits, like "Valentino", "Va' har du under blusen, Rut? ", "Jag har en dröm" and "Till min kära", which during the period 1995-1997 was on the list for 73 weeks, 22 of the hits made first place.

Today, the twins Håkan an Göran are the only original members. The other members are Kenny Samuelsson, Anders Larsson (taking over when Lasse Larsson left the band, Anders is Lasse's brother's son) and Kjetil Granli.

== Members ==
=== Vocals ===
- 1959-1966: Gert Gert Lengstrand
- 1967-1969 Curt Borkman
- 1969-1970: Robert Löfvendahl
- 1970-1984: Ove Pilebo
- 1984-1990: Towe Wideberg
- 1990-1997: Bosse Möllberg
- 1997-____: Kenny Samuelsson

=== Bass ===
- 1959-2013: Håkan Liljeblad
- 2013- : Per Lundin

=== Guitar ===
- 1959-2009: Göran Liljeblad
- 2009-2014: Henrik Uhlin
- 2014-2022: Henrik Göransson
- 2022- : Maxi Jäsklid

=== Drums ===
- 1959-1963: Mats Alfredsson
- 1963-1988: Bjarne Lundqvist
- 1988-1990: Kent Szwonder
- 1990-____: Kjetil Granli

=== Keyboard ===
- 1995-2004: Lars Larsson
- 2003-2003: Jörgen Flach (replacing Lars Larsson when the latter was sick)
- 2004-____: Anders Larsson

== Discography ==
=== Albums ===
(Selective - charting albums with peak position in Swedish Albums Chart parenthesis)

Year	Album	Peak chart positions	Certifications
Year	Album	SWE	Certifications
1975	Bugga	4	
1976	Valentino	6	
1978	Speed	34	
1979	Om jag säger att jag älskar...	35	
1986	Älskar, älskar inte	44	
1997	Allt det som kärleken är	54	
2004	Gör det igen	57	
2005	Vad som än händer	60	
2005	Vad som än händer	60	
2006	Bugga med the Streaplers	60	
2007	Bästa!	18	
2009	Ett år i taget	15	
2009	Jubileums Show - Live på Liseberg	8	
2012	På egna vägar	3	
2013	I alla väder	2	
2014	Hela veckan lång	2	
2016	On the Rocks	8	
2019	Jubileumsfavoriter	10	
2020	En Gång Till	4	
2023	En bra plats i livet	57	
2024	Still Going Strong	36	
2025	Alla som vet	18	
