= Jimmy Dean (song) =

1989 single by Troll

Single by Troll

from the album Troll
- Released: 1989
- Length: 4:02
- Label: Sonet
- Songwriter: Norell Oson Bard
- Producers: Ola Håkansson; Anders Hansson; Tim Norell

Troll singles chronology
"On a Kangaroo" (1989)	"Jimmy Dean" (1989)	"It's Serious" (1990)

"Jimmy Dean" is a song by the Swedish pop band Troll, released as the third single from their second studio album, Troll, in 1989. The song was written by the songwriting team Norell Oson Bard and was produced by Ola Håkansson, Anders Hansson and Tim Norell. It references a character strongly implied to be 1950s American film actor James Dean. The song became a number-one hit in Sweden in February 1990 and was certified platinum.

== Chart performance ==
"Jimmy Dean" debuted at number 19 on Sweden's Topplistan chart on 27 December 1989. The song then rose up the chart, eventually reaching number one on 7 February 1990. The Swedish chart was published on a fortnightly basis in 1990, so "Jimmy Dean" stayed at number one on 14 February. The following week, it fell to number two, having been replaced at number one by Sinéad O'Connor's "Nothing Compares 2 U". "Jimmy Dean" remained on the Swedish chart for five more fortnights, totalling 18 weeks on the Topplistan chart altogether. The song was Sweden's 33rd-most-successful hit of 1990 and was certified platinum for shipments exceeding 50,000 copies.

== Track listings ==
7-inch single

A. "Jimmy Dean" – 4:02
B. "Jimmy Dean" (instrumental version) – 4:02

12-inch single

A1. "Jimmy Dean" (extended version) – 7:00
B1. "Jimmy Dean" (7-inch version) – 4:02
B2. "Jimmy Dean" (instrumental version) – 4:02

== Charts ==
=== Weekly charts ===
Chart (1990)	Peak position
Sweden (Sverigetopplistan)	1

=== Year-end charts ===
Chart (1990)	Position
Sweden (Topplistan)	33

== Certifications ==
Region	Certification	Certified units/sales
Sweden (GLF)	Platinum	50,000^{^}
^{^} Shipments figures based on certification alone.

== Cover versions ==
In 1995, Finnish female pop duo CatCat brought out a Finnish-language version of the song, entitled "Piirtelet mun sydämeen (You draw in my heart)". This version was renewed in 2017 when the duo re-recorded the song, changing its form from pop to club music.

In 1998, Forte, a Polish duo, released a Polish-language version of the song, entitled "Monte Carlo i Ty (Monte Carlo and You)". In this version, the sound has been changed to be closer to Eurodance music, the melody of the verses has been changed and an English rap part has been added. The cover in the Polish language version was the title track of the Forte duo cassette and album.
