= Max Lorentz =

Swedish musician, songwriter and producer

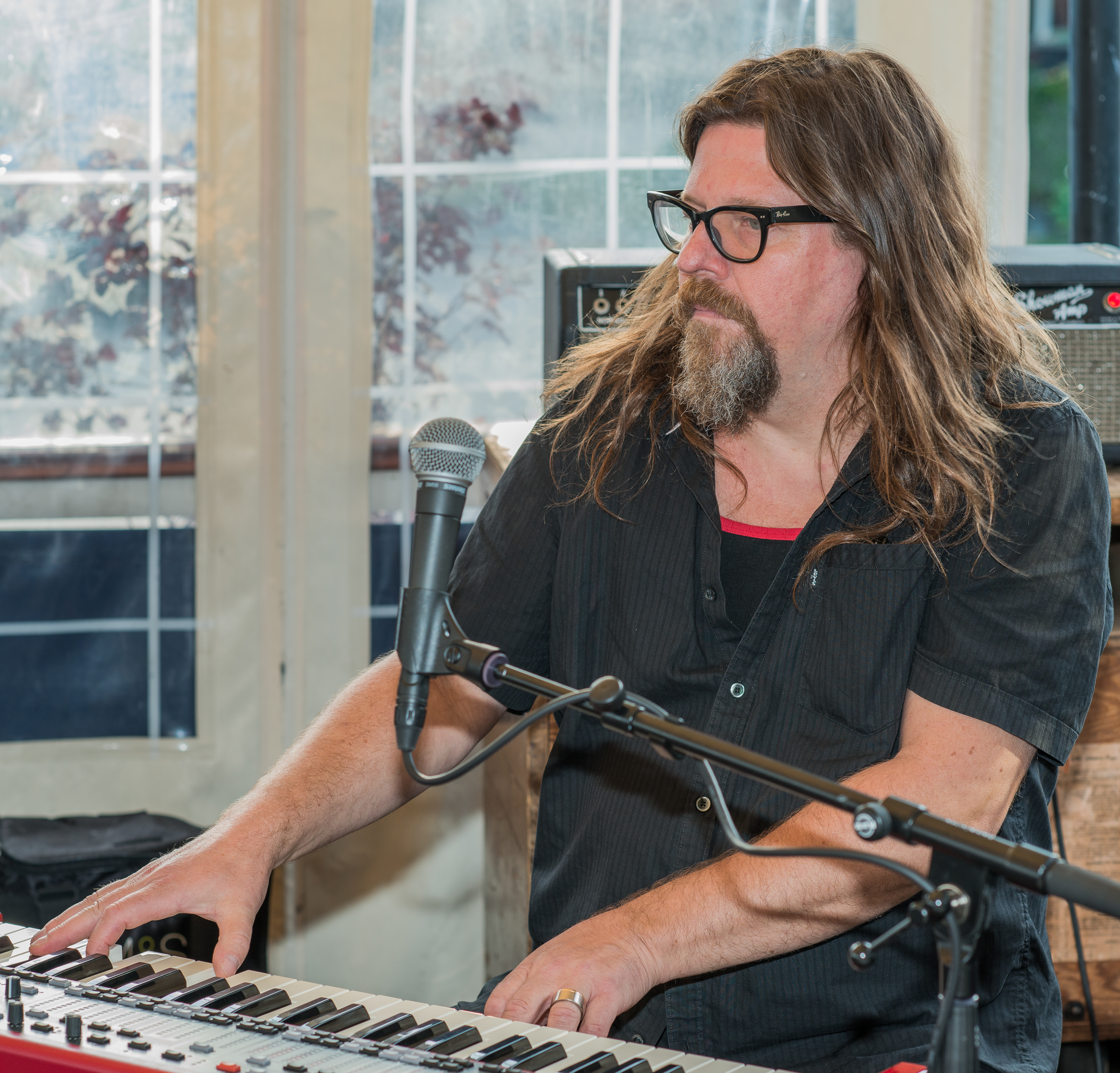
Max Lorentz at Winbergs Vaxholm July 2014

Max Lorentz (born in Täby, 16 November 1962) is a Swedish musician, songwriter and producer. He has also worked as a session-musician with artists including Ulf Lundell, Sanne Salomonsen, Agnetha Fältskog, Björn Skifs, E-Type, Eldkvarn, Grymlings, Pugh Rogefeldt and Magnus Lindberg, and has hosted the Swedish TV shows Max, Live Show and Musikmatchen, and appeared on Jeopardy!. He hosted the radio show Sommartoppen in 1996.

He has released 6 solo albums to date.

He contributed 3 songs to the 2009 Crispin Glover Records album "All Sewn Up - A Tribute to Patrik Fitzgerald" together with Jello Biafra of the Dead Kennedys and Motorpsycho amongst others.

In 2014 he became the 5th member of the legendary British rock group Tyla Gang and in 2015 a member of Swedish progressive rock band Kaipa Da Capo with guitarist Roine Stolt.

Max Lorentz runs a record company called Blind Boyscout Recordings with mainly digital releases of his own as well as related music.

== Production discography ==
- Mikael Rickfors "Vingar" 1988
- Tone Norum "Red" 1990
- Mikael Rickfors "Judas River" 1991
- Mats Ronander "Himlen Gråter För Elmore James" 1992
- Lars Demian "Man Får Vara Glad Att Man Inte Är Död" 1994
- Kim Larsen "Kim Larsen & Kjukken" 1996
- Kim Larsen "Luft Under Vingerne" 1998
- Rolf Wikström "Allting Förändras" 2001
- Silverbug "Your Permanent Record" 2005
- Dr. Livingstone "Au Tour De La Ville" 2006
- Jonatan Stenson "Jonatan Stenson" 2007
- Rolf Wikström "Istället för tystnad" 2011
- Mårran "Mårran" 2012
- Mårran "Mårran 2" 2012
- Mårran "Vid liv" 2012
- Mårran "Mårran 3/4" 2014
- Tyla Gang "Live in Stockholm" 2014

== Artist discography ==
- Continental (with Bitch Boys) 1981
- Subshow (with Subshow) 1986.
- Lovely 1994
- Bravo 1996
- 12 Songs 2000
- The World Is Watching 2004
- Au Tour De La Ville (with Dr.Livingstone) 2006
- Arktis (progressive instrumental project) 2007
- All Sewn Up - A Tribute to Patrik Fitzgerald 2009
- Kiss You in the Rain - Max Lorentz sings David Bowie 2011
- Shiningstar - Max Lorentz sings David Bowie again 2017
- Rossi of Sweden (with Rossi of Sweden) 2018

== Blind Boyscout Recordings ==
Releases up to date:

- Arktis "Arktis (featuring Max Lorentz)" - Max Lorentz progressive instrumental recordings.
- Subshow "Subshow" - The complete recordings of Max Lorentz and Michael Thimrén's 1980s grunge band.
- Dr. Livingstone "Au Tour De La Ville" - Max Lorentz and Anders Gullberg's electro/dub project.
- Johan Walin "Put Me in the Spotlight" - Max Lorentz' brother Johan Walin's debut LP from 1984.
- Johan Walin "Live at Antons" - Max Lorentz' brother Johan Walin's second album from 1994.

Upcoming releases:

- Bitch Boys "Continental" - The 1981 post-punk LP from Max Lorentz and Michael Thimrén's band.
- Lovely - Max Lorentz 1994 debut album.
- Bravo - Max Lorentz second album from 1996.
- 12 Songs - Max Lorentz third album from 2000.
- The World Is Watching - Max Lorentz fourth album from 2004.
