= Farväl till släkt och vänner =

Song by Björn Afzelius

from the album Elsinore
- Language: Swedish
- Released: 1999
- Songwriter: Björn Afzelius

"Farväl till släkt och vänner" is a song written by Björn Afzelius and recorded by himself on his 1999 album Elsinore, just before his death on 16 February the same year. Lyrical, it deals with minor things becoming major media scandales, while at the same time getting more attention than serious problems like alcoholism and domestic abuse.

The song charted at Svensktoppen, entering chart on 5 June 1999 (third position), and reached the first position the upcoming week. By late 1999, the song often switched position 1 and 2 with Vikingarna's "Våran lilla hemlighet". On 6 May 2000, the song charted for last time, at 7th position. before being knocked out of chart.

In 2004, the song was recorded by Chinox on the album named after the song.
