= Trio me' Bumba =

Swedish band

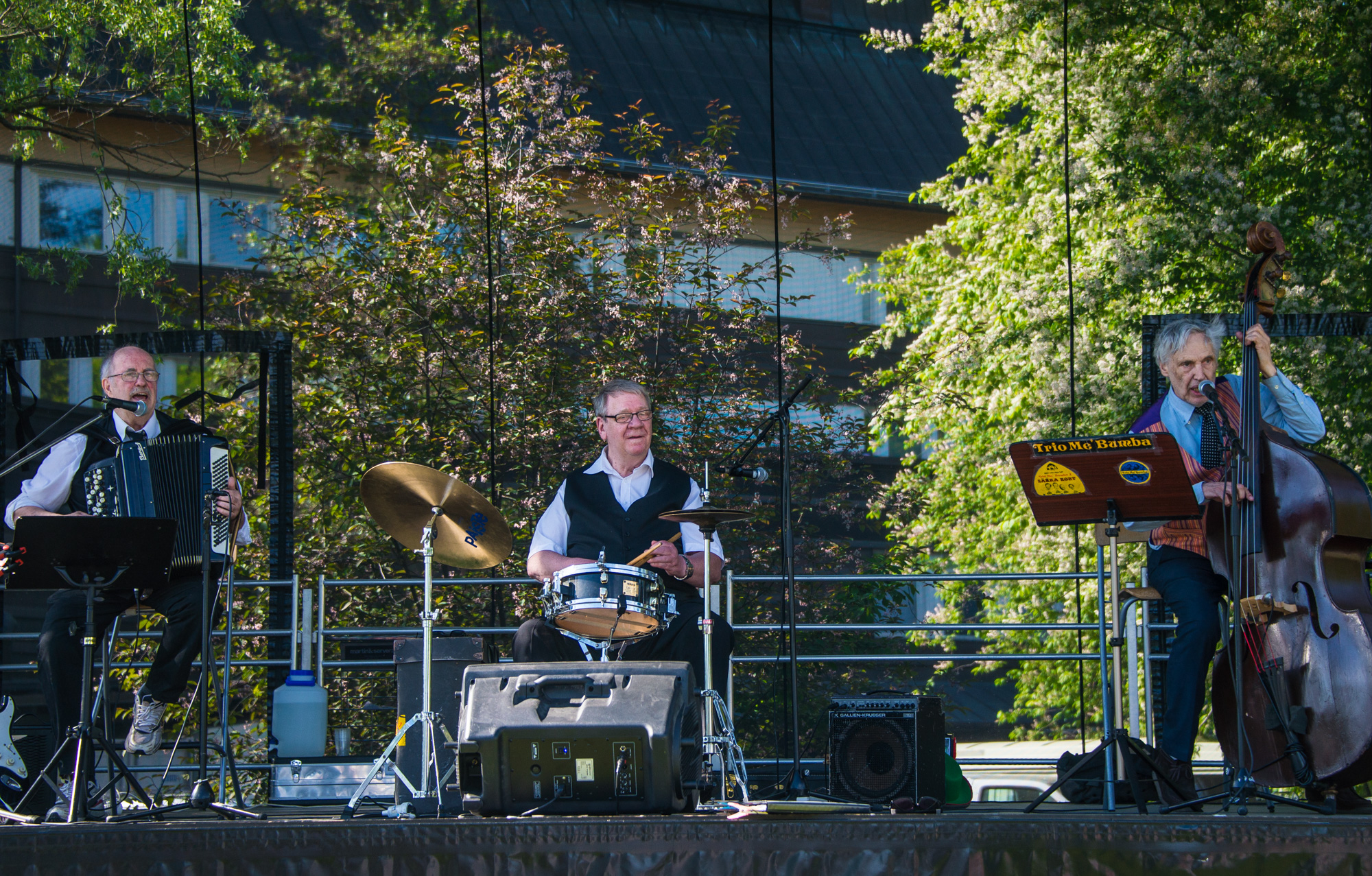
- Trio me' Bumba performing in 2017, from left to right: Bertil Lindblom, Jan Harg and Jan-Erik "Bumba" Lindqvist

Background information
- Origin: Stockholm, Sweden
- Genres: Pop; schlager
- Years active: 1957–present
- Labels: Columbia; Odean; EMI
- Members: Jan-Erik "Bumba" Lindqvist; Bertil Lindblom; Jan Harg; Rolf Larsson
- Past members: Tommy Wener

Trio me' Bumba' is a band established at Södermalm in Stockholm, Sweden in 1957. They broke through in 1963 with the song "Spel-Olles gånglåt", charting for 30 weeks at Svensktoppen. One of their most famous songs is Man ska leva för varandra from 1968.
