= Susanne Alfvengren =

Swedish singer

- Born: 12 February 1959 (age 66); Visby, Sweden
- Genres: Pop
- Occupation: Singer

Susanne Alfvengren (born Susanne Irene Lund, 12 February 1959 in Visby, Gotland, Sweden) is a Swedish singer. In 1984, Susanne Alfvengren had a hit with När vi rör varann. Another of her hits was Magneter. She competed in Melodifestivalen 2009 with the song "Du är älskad där du går", which was knocked out from the contest after the semi-final. In 1986–1987, she scored a vocal duet hit with Mikael Rickfors, with "Som stormen river öppet hav". It peaked at number three on the Swedish Singles Chart.

== Filmography ==
- PS Sista sommaren (PS Last Summer), 1988
