= Bitch Boys =

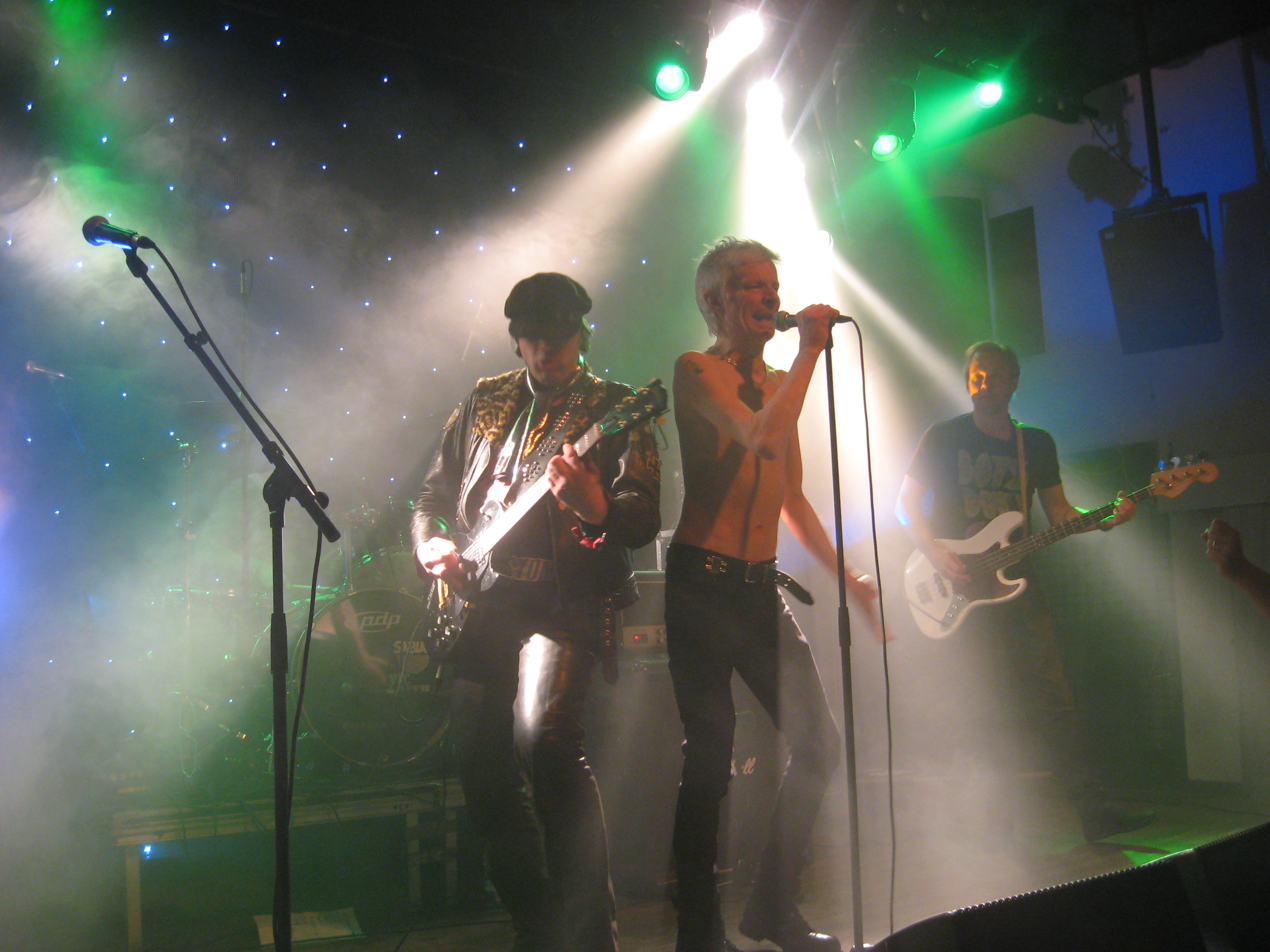
- Bitch Boys playing at Punkgala 2010.

Background information
- Origin: Stockholm, Sweden
- Genres: Punk
- Years active: 1978–1981, 1994, 2010

Bitch Boys is a Swedish punk band from Stockholm formed in 1978. They disbanded in 1981 after several songs. They reunited again in 1994 and rerecorded all the old songs again on a compilation album called Vi är trötta på att vara bäst ("We are tired of being the best"). The name of the band is a parody of the Beach Boys.

The LP Continental and single Die Bahnhof Cafe was made by a partially new Bitch Boys by Peter Eriksson (Pierre LaCroix), as the only original member, on bass, Michael Thimrén (Henri Michel) on guitar, Ulf Erlandsson on drums and Max Lorentz on lead vocals and synthesizers. This incarnation was as much influenced by bands like Kraftwerk, DAF and Spandau Ballet as punk rock.

== Discography ==
- 1979 – Häftig fredag (EP)
- 1979 – "Hela mitt liv" (single)
- 1980 – "Jag trivs" (single)
- 1980 – H-Son Produktion (LP)
- 1981 – Á capella schumacher (EP)
- 1981 – "Die Bahnhof café" (single)
- 1981 – Continental (LP)
- 1994 – Vi är trötta på att vara bäst (CD)
- 2015 – Revanschen (EP)
