= Jenny Strömstedt =

Swedish journalist, author and television host

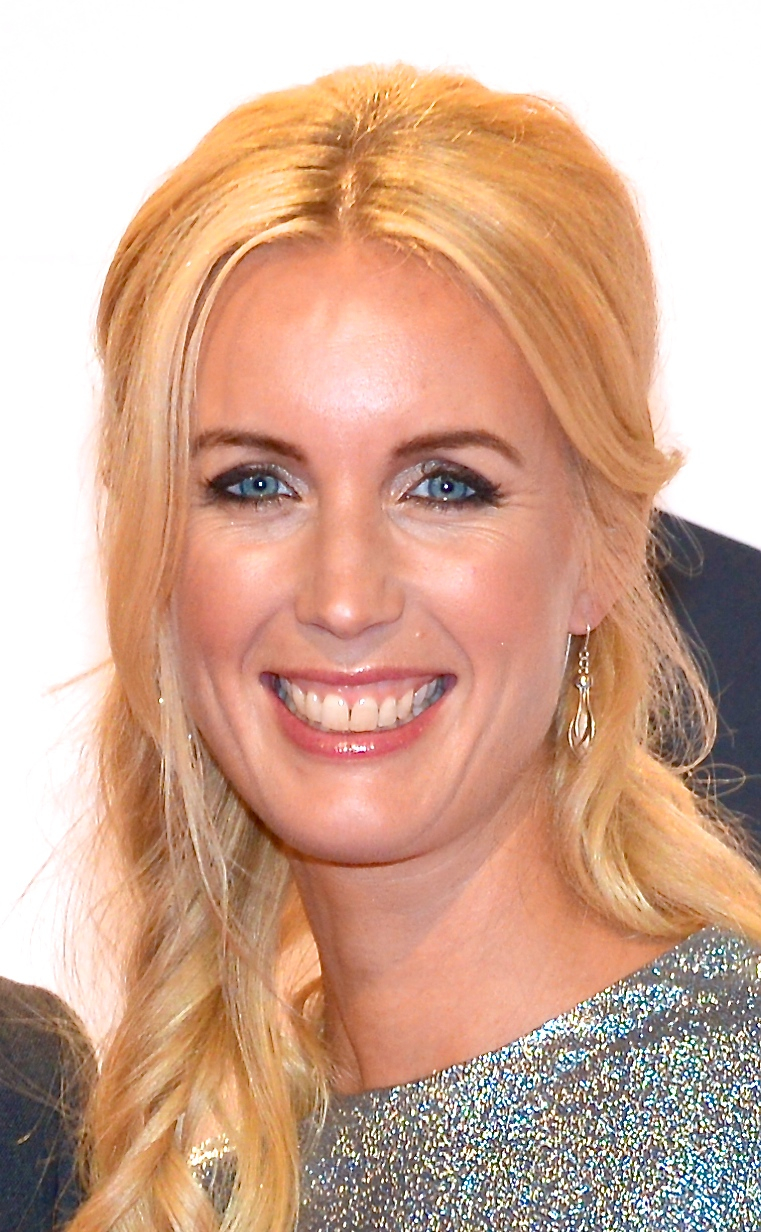
- Strömstedt in 2013
- Born: Jenny Kristina Andersson; 2 August 1972 (age 53); Sollentuna, Sweden
- Occupations: Journalist, author, television host
- Spouses: Fredrik Östergren (divorced) Niklas Strömstedt (m. 2011)
- Children: 3 (with Östergren)

Jenny Kristina Östergren Strömstedt (née Andersson; 2 August 1972) is a Swedish journalist, author and television host. She has worked on the TV4 television program Nyhetsmorgon and hosted Kalla Fakta, Pangea.nu, Svart eller Vitt and Diskus. Since 8 October 2012 Strömstedt is hosting her talk show Jenny Strömstedt on TV4. On 16 July 2011, Jenny who at that time had the last name Östergren married singer Niklas Strömstedt. Jenny Strömstedt has three children from a previous relationship. She also competed in Let's Dance 2015.
