= Vart du än går =

1990 single by Niklas Strömstedt

Single by Niklas Strömstedt

from the album Om!
- Language: Swedish
- B-side: "Så snurrar din jord"
- Released: 1990
- Studio: Polar (Stockholm)
- Genre: Rock; pop
- Length: 3:53
- Label: WEA; Polar
- Songwriter: Niklas Strömstedt
- Producers: Niklas Strömstedt; Bernard Löhr

Niklas Strömstedt singles chronology
| "Om" (1990) | "Vart du än går" (1990) | "Flickor talar om kärleken (Män dom gör just ingenting alls)" (1990) |

Audio
- "Vart du än går" on YouTube

"Vart du än går" is a song by Swedish singer-songwriter Niklas Strömstedt from his fourth studio album, Om! (1990).

== Commercial performance ==
In Sweden, it reached number 13 and spent three weeks on the chart.

== Track listing and formats ==
- European 7-inch single

A. "Vart du än går" – 3:53
B. "Så snurrar din jord" – 3:32

- Swedish promotional CD single
1. "Vart du än går" – 4:00

== Credits and personnel ==
- Niklas Strömstedt – songwriter, producer, vocals, arranger
- Bernard Löhr – producer, arranger, engineering

Credits and personnel adapted from the Om! album and 7-inch single liner notes.

== Charts ==
Weekly chart performance for "Vart du än går"
| Chart (1990) | Peak position |
|---|---|
| Sweden (Sverigetopplistan) | 13 |
