= Glenmark, Eriksson, Strömstedt =

1995 studio album by Glenmark Eriksson Strömstedt

Studio album by Glenmark Eriksson Strömstedt
- Released: 20 January 1995
- Recorded: 1994
- Studio: Polar (Stockholm)
- Genre: Rock; pop
- Length: 46:30
- Label: Metronome
- Producer: Anders Glenmark

Glenmark Eriksson Strömstedt chronology
Glenmark, Eriksson, Strömstedt (1995)	Den andra skivan (2003)

Singles from Glenmark, Eriksson, Strömstedt
- 1. "När vi gräver guld i USA" Released: May 1994; 2. "En jävel på kärlek" Released: 23 December 1994; 3. "Från dag till dag" Released: 1995; 4. "Hon är min" Released: 1995; 5. "Stanna världen en stund" Released: 1995

Glenmark, Eriksson, Strömstedt is the debut studio album by the Swedish supergroup Glenmark Eriksson Strömstedt. Produced by Anders Glenmark, it was released on Warner's Metronome label on 20 January 1995 in Sweden.

== Track listing ==
All songs written by Glenmark Eriksson Strömstedt.

Side one
No.	Title	Length
1.	"Hon är min"	4:23
2.	"En jävel på kärlek"	3:37
3.	"Leta där du bor"	4:11
4.	"Stanna världen en stund"	3:55
5.	"Ingenting minner om dej"	4:18
6.	"Jag gråter inte mer"	2:55
Total length:		23:19

Side two
No.	Title	Length
1.	"Människor som vi"	3:34
2.	"Natten är min vän"	4:07
3.	"Från dag till dag"	4:47
4.	"Älska din älskling"	2:49
5.	"Nåt som går"	3:45
6.	"När vi gräver guld i USA"	4:09
Total length:		23:11

== Personnel ==
GES

- Anders Glenmark – lead vocals, guitar
- Orup – lead vocals, guitar
- Niklas Strömstedt – lead vocals, guitar

== Charts ==
Weekly chart performance for Glenmark, Eriksson, Strömstedt
Chart (1995–1997)	Peak position
Finnish Albums (Suomen virallinen lista)	24
Norwegian Albums (VG-lista)	13
Swedish Albums (Sverigetopplistan)	1
