= Troll (Swedish band) =

Swedish pop band

- Origin: Falun, Dalarna, Sweden
- Genres: Pop
- Years active: 1985–1992

Troll was a Swedish pop band most noted for the single "Jimmy Dean". Their first band name was Trollrock because they dressed up as Trolls on stage.

Band members Annika Larsson, Helena Caspersson, Erica Bergman, Nina Norberg, Petra Norén Dahl, Jenny Jons and Monica Blom were childhood friends from Falun.

== Discography ==
=== Albums ===
- Stoppa Sabbet (1986)
- Troll (1989)
- Put Your Hands in the Air (1990)
- Flashback #07 (1995)

=== Singles ===
- "It's a Miracle" (1987)
- "Calling on Your Heart" (1988)
- "On a Kangaroo" (1988)
- "Jimmy Dean" (1989)
- "It's Serious" (1990)
- "Midsummer Night" (1990)
- "Put Your Hands in the Air" (1990)
- "The Greatest Kid in Town" (1991)
