= Thor Görans =

Swedish dansband

- Origin: Örnsköldsvik, Sweden
- Years active: 1976-2006 (temporary reunions in 2007 and 2010)

Thor Görans was a dansband in Örnsköldsvik, Sweden, established 1976 and disestablished following the final gig in Lycksele, Sweden 8 April 2006.

== Discography ==
=== Albums ===
Studio

- Svunna tiders lycka - 1982
- Glöm ej bort det finns rosor - 1984
- Lyckans dag - 1989
- Känslor mellan två - 1990
- Judy - 1992
- Ta mig hem - 1996
- En på miljonen - 2000
- Ändrade planer - 2003
- Lika barn leka bäst - 2016

Compilations

- 40 År på Vägarna 1975-2015 - 2015

=== Album contribution ===
- Soundtrack: Black Jack - 1990

== Svensktoppen hit songs ==
- I mitt innersta hjärta - 1993
- Att älska så här - 1996
- Ingen som du - 1997
- Att älska så här - 1996
- En vän för livet - 1998-1999
- Små ögonblick - 1999
- Ett hjärta som älskar - 1999
- Säg att du längtar - 2000
- När alla gått hem - 2002

=== Non-charting ===
- Älskar du mej - 1998
- En på miljonen - 2000
- Med fötterna på jorden - 2001
