= It Started with a Love Affair =

Song by Jerry Williams
- Language: English
- Released: 1989
- Genre: Rock
- Songwriter(s): Norell Oson Bard

"It Started with a Love Affair" is a 1989 song first performed by Swedish singer Jerry Williams. The song was written by Norell Oson Bard.

== Chart performance ==
The song charted for three weeks (from June 10–24, 1989) on the Swedish Trackslistan and peaked at number seven in its final week before the summer hiatus.

== Covers ==
A Swedish version, with lyrics by Keith Almgren, called "En kärleksaffär" (eng. "A Love Affair") has been recorded by Mats Rådberg & Rankarna and later by Matz Bladhs (1991 on the album Leende dansmusik 91).
