= Allt som jag känner =

Single by Tone Norum & Tommy Nilsson
- A-side: "Allt som jag känner"
- B-side: "My Summer With You"
- Released: 1987
- Genre: soft rock
- Label: Sonet
- Songwriter: Norell Oson Bard

"Allt som jag känner" is a vocal duet written by songwriter trio Norell Oson Bard, and recorded by Tone Norum & Tommy Nilsson, who released it as a single in 1987. It peaked atop the Swedish Singles Chart between 17 February–13 April 1988, and also charted at Svensktoppen between 31 January–4 December 1988, peaking at number one.

The song was also recorded in English, as "My Summer With You", which became the third greatest Trackslistan hit of 1988.

Both the English-language and the Swedish language-versions of the songs can be heard in the 1988 film PS Last Summer.

== Charts ==
Chart (1988)	Peak position
Sweden (Sverigetopplistan)	1
