= Sista morgonen =

1988 single by Niklas Strömstedt

Single by Niklas Strömstedt

from the album En gång i livet
- Language: Swedish
- B-side: "Andra sidan midnatt"
- Released: 1988
- Studio: EMI (Stockholm)
- Genre: Rock; pop
- Length: 3:22
- Label: EMI
- Songwriter: Niklas Strömstedt
- Producer: Niklas Strömstedt

Niklas Strömstedt singles chronology
"Precis som ett barn" (1985)	"Sista morgonen" (1988)	"En kvinna och en man" (1989)

Audio
- "Sista morgonen" on YouTube

"Sista morgonen" is a song by Swedish singer-songwriter Niklas Strömstedt from his third studio album, En gång i livet (1989).

== Cover versions ==
In 2015, Swedish singer Miriam Bryant released an English version of the song entitled "One Last Time". This version peaked at number 4 on the Sverigetopplistan chart.

== Track listing and formats ==
- Swedish 7-inch single

A. "Sista morgonen" – 3:22
B. "Andra sidan midnatt" – 4:43

== Credits and personnel ==
- Niklas Strömstedt – songwriter, producer, vocals
- Björn Boström – engineering
- Björn Norén – engineering
- Anders Herrlin – engineering
- Alar Suurna – mixing
- Mattias Edwall – cover art, photographer
- Sven Dolling – cover art designer

Credits and personnel adapted from the En gång i livet album and 7-inch single liner notes.

== Charts ==
=== Weekly charts ===
Weekly chart performance for "Sista morgonen"
Chart (1989)	Peak position
Sweden (Sverigetopplistan)	5

== Certifications ==
Certifications for "Sista morgonen"
Region	Certification	Certified units/sales
Sweden (GLF)	Gold	25,000^{^}
^{^} Shipments figures based on certification alone.
