= Glenmark Eriksson Strömstedt =

Swedish supergroup

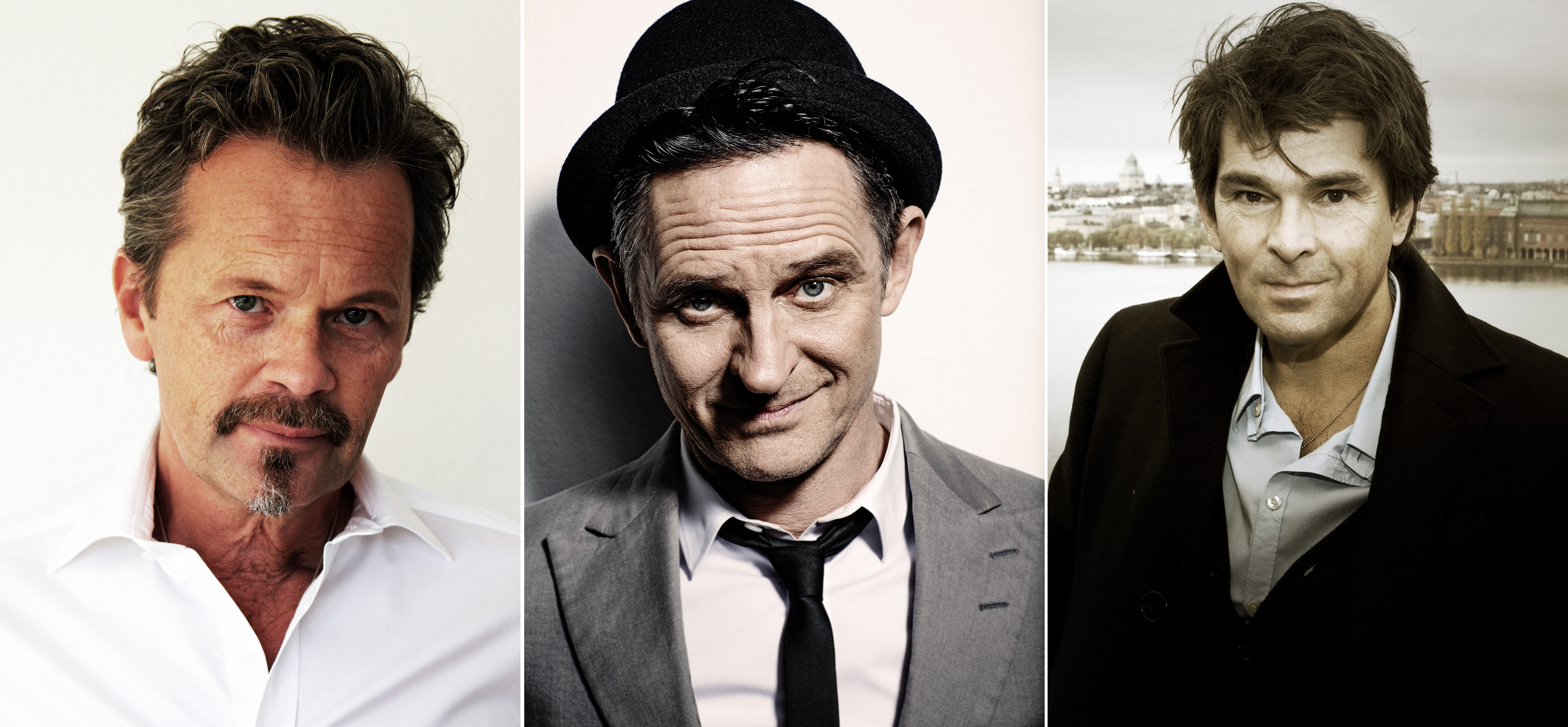
- From left to right: Anders Glenmark, Orup and Niklas Strömstedt

Background information
- Origin: Sweden
- Genres: Rock; pop
- Years active: 1994–1995; 2002–2003; 2017; 2018; 2022
- Labels: Metronome; Columbia
- Members: Anders Glenmark; Orup; Niklas Strömstedt

Glenmark Eriksson Strömstedt (GES) is a Swedish supergroup formed in 1994. The group's line-up comprises Anders Glenmark, Orup and Niklas Strömstedt, whose last names begin with the letters forming the trio's name. During 1994 and 1995, the group achieved many list successes in Sweden, and has since then been active in periods.

== History ==
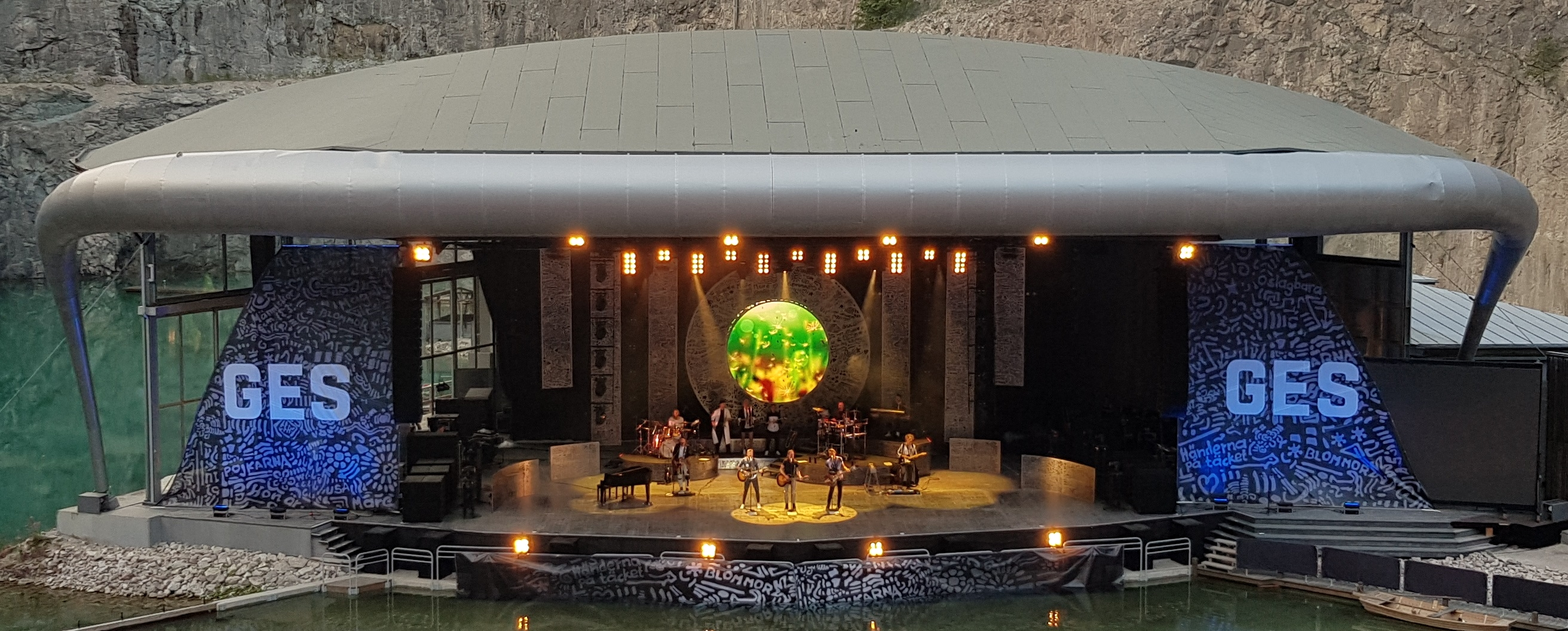
Glenmark, Eriksson and Strömstedt performing at Dalhalla on 12 July 2018

In 1993, Anders Glenmark, Orup and Niklas Strömstedt performed together in a group called "Miss Ellies Kapell" at the entertainment house Brygget in Åre, where they played each other's songs. The group also consisted of Micke "Syd" Andersson from Gyllene Tider and Tommy Ekman from Style. Strömstedt had later been asked by the Swedish Football Association to write the official song for the 1994 FIFA World Cup. He accepted the assignment together with Orup and Glenmark in order to write the song.

The World Cup song När vi gräver guld i USA became a big hit single during the summer of 1994 and won a Grammis award for Song of the Year in February 1995.

By the end of January 1995, the album Glenmark, Eriksson, Strömstedt was released, which peaked at the top of the charts in Sweden. In connection with the album release, SVT broadcast a special program about GES under the direction of Felix Herngren. The album has sold over 500,000 copies and is considered a Swedish pop classic, with hit singles such as "En jävel på kärlek" and "Hon är min". During the summer of 1995, a sold-out tour of Sweden was performed by the group, which was seen by over 200,000 people.

The group made a comeback as an intermission during the final of the Melodifestivalen 2003 in the Ericsson Globe and released their second album Den andra skivan in April of the same year. The album peaked at No. 2 on the Sverigetopplistan and during the summer a tour of 25 performance dates was carried out. The tour was not a success and had low audience numbers.

After not performing together for almost ten years, a mutual friend of the group had his birthday in the summer of 2012, and the members decided to perform some covers of his favorite songs. When Orup got his own hour of Allsång på Skansen in "Allsångsscenen är din" during the summer of 2016, GES made a comeback with a few songs and the interest to continue playing together was aroused.

In the summer of 2017, the band played six sold-out evenings in front of 24,000 concertgoers at Borgholm Castle on the island of Öland. During the summer of 2018, GES conducted its first concert tour since 2003, with a premiere at Dalhalla on 11 July and ending at Skansen on 25 August, with a total of 18 performance dates. The tour premiere at Dalhalla broke the audience record for the arena with a total of 5,739 visitors.

In the spring of 2020, a pub show was planned to be performed at the Gothia Towers in Gothenburg. It was originally going to be performed between 3 April and 2 May, but it was delayed due to the COVID-19 pandemic. The premiere was moved to Cirkus in Stockholm in September and the Gothenburg dates were planned to be held in Scandinavium during March 2021.

== Discography ==
- Glenmark, Eriksson, Strömstedt (1995)
- Den andra skivan (2003)
