= Hon har blommor i sitt hår =

1990 single by Anders Glenmark

Single by Anders Glenmark

from the album Jag finns här för dig
- Language: Swedish
- B-side: "Hon har blommor i sitt hår – andra sidan"
- Released: 1990
- Studio: Polar (Stockholm)
- Genre: Rock; pop
- Length: 3:05
- Label: The Record Station; Polar
- Songwriters: Anders Glenmark; Leif Käck
- Producer: Anders Glenmark

Anders Glenmark singles chronology
"Prinsessor bor någon annanstans" (1989)	"Hon har blommor i sitt hår" (1990)	"Hon sa" (1990)

Music video
- "Hon har blommor i sitt hår" on YouTube

"Hon har blommor i sitt hår" is a song by Swedish singer-songwriter Anders Glenmark from his sixth studio album, Jag finns här för dig (1990). The song was written by Glenmark and Leif Käck, and produced by Glenmark.

== Track listing and formats ==
- Swedish 7-inch single

A. "Hon har blommor i sitt hår" – 3:05
B. "Hon har blommor i sitt hår – andra sidan" – 3:33

== Credits and personnel ==
- Anders Glenmark – songwriter, producer, vocals
- Leif Käck – songwriter
- Lennart Östlund – engineering
- Peter Dahl – mastering

Credits and personnel adapted from the Jag finns här för dig album and 7-inch single liner notes.

== Charts ==
=== Weekly charts ===
Weekly chart performance for "Hon har blommor i sitt hår"
Chart (1990)	Peak position
Sweden (Sverigetopplistan)	6

== Certifications ==
Certifications for "Hon har blommor i sitt hår"
Region	Certification	Certified units/sales
Sweden (GLF)	Gold	25,000^{^}
^{^} Shipments figures based on certification alone.
