= Den andra skivan =

2003 studio album by Glenmark Eriksson Strömstedt

Studio album by Glenmark Eriksson Strömstedt
- Released: April 2003
- Genre: Europop
- Length: 48:29
- Label: Columbia
- Producer: Anders Glenmark

Glenmark Eriksson Strömstedt chronology
Glenmark, Eriksson, Strömstedt (1995)	Den andra skivan (2003)

Singles from Den andra skivan
- 1. "Den andra kvinnan" Released: 2003; 2. "Händerna på täcket" Released: 2003; 3. "Sångerna om sommaren" Released: 2003

Den andra skivan is the second studio album by the Swedish supergroup Glenmark Eriksson Strömstedt.

== Track listing ==
All songs written by Glenmark Eriksson Strömstedt.

Side one
No.	Title	Length
1.	"Händerna på täcket"	4:25
2.	"Sångerna om sommaren"	4:09
3.	"Handen på hjärtat"	4:02
4.	"Den andra kvinnan"	4:12
5.	"Utantill"	5:28
6.	"Lika bra som jag"	3:08
Total length:		25:24

Side two
No.	Title	Length
1.	"Den stora kärleken"	4:03
2.	"Vin och rosor"	3:23
3.	"Inga kvinnor kvar"	2:53
4.	"Dom kommer och dom går"	3:38
5.	"Hon vet vad hon vill ha"	3:43
6.	"Tar Gud American Express?"	5:25
Total length:		23:05

== Charts ==
Chart (2003)	Peak position
Swedish Albums (Sverigetopplistan)	2
