= Om (Niklas Strömstedt song) =

1990 single by Niklas Strömstedt

Single by Niklas Strömstedt

from the album Om!
- Language: Swedish
- B-side: "Stanna kvar!"
- Released: 1990-03-05
- Genre: Rock; pop
- Length: 4:06
- Label: WEA; Polar
- Songwriter: Niklas Strömstedt
- Producers: Niklas Strömstedt; Bernard Löhr

Niklas Strömstedt singles chronology
"Förlorad igen" (1989)	"Om" (1990)	"Vart du än går" (1990)

Audio
- "Om" on YouTube

"Om" is a song by Swedish singer-songwriter Niklas Strömstedt from his fourth studio album of the same name (1990).

== Track listing and formats ==
- European 7-inch single

A. "Om" – 4:06
B. "Stanna kvar!" – 3:42

== Credits and personnel ==
- Niklas Strömstedt – songwriter, producer, vocals, arranger
- Bernard Löhr – producer, arranger, engineering
- Mikael Jansson – cover art, photographer
- Mikael Varhelyi – cover art designer

Credits and personnel adapted from the Om! album and 7-inch single liner notes.

== Charts ==
=== Weekly charts ===
Weekly chart performance for "Om"
Chart (1990)	Peak position
Norway (VG-lista)	7
Sweden (Sverigetopplistan)	1

2025 weekly chart performance for "Om"
Chart (2025)	Peak position
Norway (VG-lista)	6

=== Year-end charts ===
Year-end chart performance for "Om"
Chart (2025)	Position
Sweden (Sverigetopplistan)	42

== Certifications and sales ==
Certifications and sales for "Om"
Region	Certification	Certified units/sales
Sweden (GLF)	Gold	25,000^{^}
^{^} Shipments figures based on certification alone.
