= Om! =

1990 studio album by Niklas Strömstedt

Studio album by Niklas Strömstedt
- Released: September 1990
- Studio: Polar (Stockholm)
- Genre: Rock; pop
- Length: 44:08
- Label: WEA; Polar
- Producer: Niklas Strömstedt; Bernard Löhr

Niklas Strömstedt chronology
En gång i livet (1989)	Om! (1990)	Tårar i regn (1990)

Singles from Om!
- 1. "Om" Released: 1990; 2. "Vart du än går" Released: 1990; 3. "Flickor talar om kärleken" Released: 1990; 4. "Runt, runt, runt" Released: 1991; 5. "En väg till mitt hjärta" Released: 1991

Om! is the fourth studio album by Swedish singer-songwriter Niklas Strömstedt, released in 1990, by WEA.

== Track listing ==
All tracks are written by Niklas Strömstedt.

Om! – Side one
No.	Title	Length
1.	"En väg till mitt hjärta"	3:39
2.	"Runt, runt, runt"	4:10
3.	"Flickor talar om kärleken (Män dom gör just ingenting alls)"	3:44
4.	"Vänta på en vän"	3:40
5.	"Vart du än går"	3:53
6.	"Så snurrar din jord"	3:32
Total length:		22:38

Om! – Side two
No.	Title	Length
1.	"Modiga män"	4:18
2.	"Om"	4:04
3.	"Som om hon inte fanns"	4:26
4.	"Mannen i ditt liv"	4:12
5.	"Någon tycker om dej"	4:30
Total length:		21:30

== Charts ==
Weekly chart performance for Om!
Chart (1990–1991)	Peak position
Norwegian Albums (VG-lista)	18
Swedish Albums (Sverigetopplistan)	1

== Certifications ==
Certifications for Om!
Region	Certification	Certified units/sales
Sweden (GLF)	Platinum	100,000^{^}
^{^} Shipments figures based on certification alone.
