= Tone Norum =

Swedish pop singer (born 1965)

- Birth name: Tone Monika Norum
- Born: 18 September 1965 (age 59); Vardø, Norway
- Genres: Pop, rock, country
- Occupation(s): Singer, songwriter
- Years active: 1986–present

Tone Monika Norum (born 18 September 1965) is a Norwegian-born Swedish pop singer who gained popularity in the 1980s and 1990s, scoring several chart successes in Sweden. She is the younger sister of John Norum, the guitarist from the rock band Europe.

== Biography ==
Tone Norum was born in Vardø, Norway, but her family moved to Sweden when she was still a baby.

Her debut album, One of a Kind, was released in 1986. It was written and produced by Europe vocalist Joey Tempest, featured guest appearances by Europe members John Norum, Ian Haugland and Mic Michaeli, and included hits like "Stranded" and "Can't You Stay?". Her second album, This Time, featured another hit, the vocal duet "Allt som jag känner" with Tommy Nilsson, and a guest appearance by Yngwie Malmsteen on the song "Point of No Return". Her 1990 album, Red, was produced by her then husband/musician/producer Max Lorentz. Norum's 1992 hit, "Don't Turn Around", was a cover of the Tina Turner song.

The last appearance of Tone Norum was in the tribute album to the Swedish singer Alf Robertson Till Alf Robertson Med Kärlek (2011), with the song "Om Du Har Ett Hjärta".

== Discography ==
=== Albums ===
Year	Album	Se
1986	One of a Kind	5
1988	This Time...	7
1990	Red	33
1992	Don't Turn Around!	26
1996	Stepping Out	-

=== Singles ===
Year	Single	Se	Album
1985	"Can't You Stay"	2	One of a Kind
1986	"Stranded"	13	One of a Kind
1986	"Built on Dreams"	-	One of a Kind
1987	"Allt Som Jag Känner" (with Tommy Nilsson)	1	Single only
1988	"This Time"	-	This Time...
1988	"Love Me"	-	This Time...
1988	"Point of No Return" (with Yngwie Malmsteen)		This Time...
1989	"Running Against the Wind"	-	Kronvittnet soundtrack
1990	"Ordinary Girl"	-	Red
1990	"How Does It Feel?"	-	Red
1990	"10 Times out of 1"	-	Red
1992	"Still in Love"	-	Don't Turn Around!
1992	"Who Needs a Broken Heart?"	-	Don't Turn Around!
1992	"Don't Turn Around"	23	Don't Turn Around!
1996	"Stepping Out"	-	Stepping Out
1996	"You Ain't Going Nowhere"	-	Stepping Out
1996	"Trust Me"	-	Stepping Out
2007	"When Love Says Goodbye" (with Jonas Otter)	-	Single only
