= Mikael Rickfors =

Swedish singer and songwriter (born 1948)

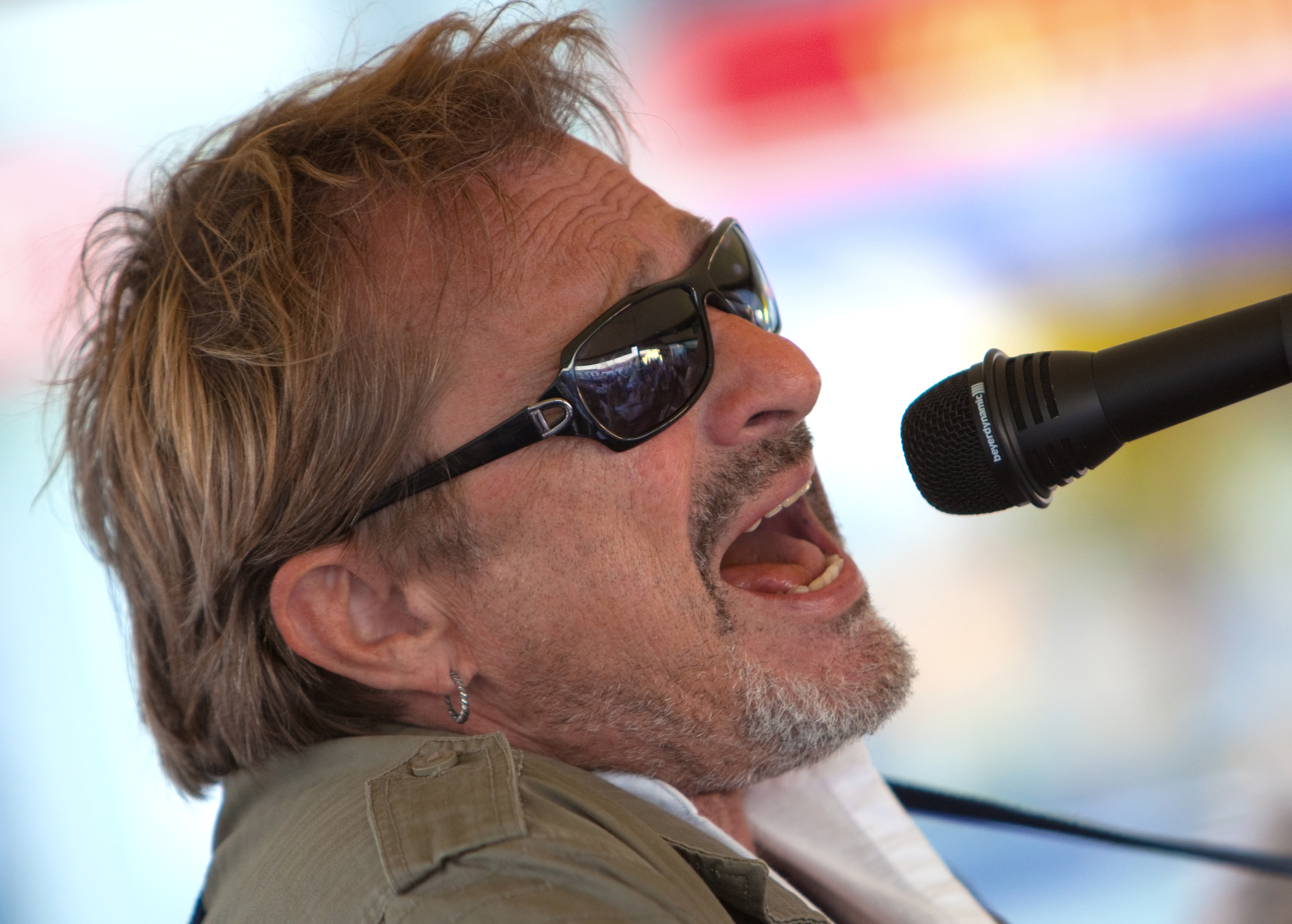
- Mikael Rickfors in Vaxholm, 2011

Background information
- Born: 4 December 1948 (age 77); Stockholm, Sweden
- Genres: Rock, pop
- Occupation: Musician
- Instruments: Vocals; guitar; bass
- Formerly of: Bamboo; The Hollies; Grymlings

Mikael Rickfors (born 4 December 1948) is a Swedish singer and songwriter. From 1968, he was the lead singer and bass guitarist in Swedish band Bamboo. The band released two singles before breaking up in 1970. Rickfors later performed with the British rock group The Hollies for about two years and recorded two albums with them, Romany and Out on the Road. Two of the Hollies' singles with Rickfors became worldwide hits in 1972: The Baby and Magic Woman Touch. Another single, Slow Down Go Down (1973), became a minor hit in Australia.
