= Niklas Strömstedt =

Swedish singer, songwriter and actor (born 1958)

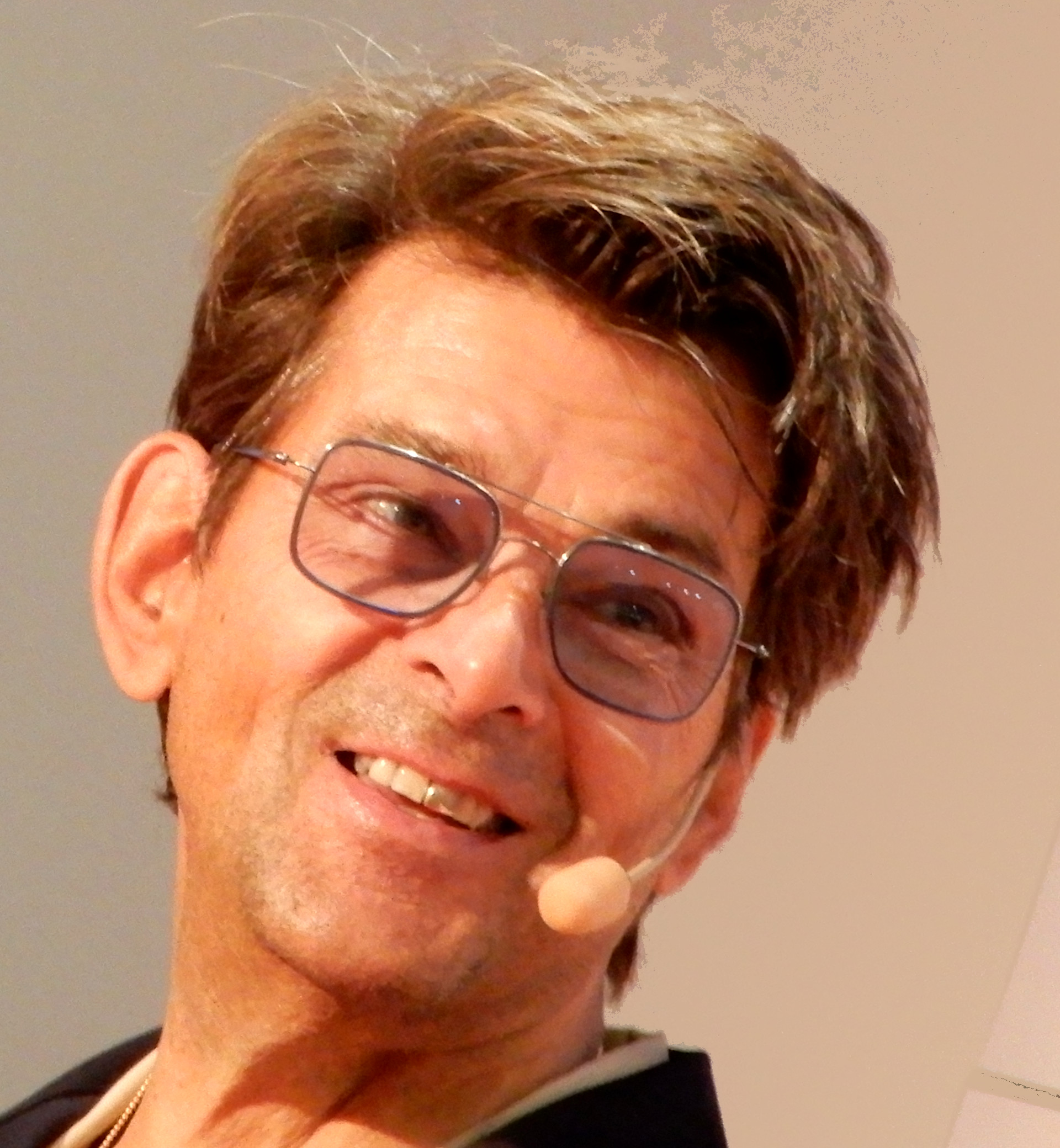
- Strömstedt at Gothenburg Book Fair in 2022
- Born: Bo Anders Niklas Strömstedt; 25 July 1958 (age 68); Lund, Sweden
- Occupations: Singer; songwriter; musician; record producer; actor
- Years active: 1967–present
- Spouse: Efva Attling (m. 1985; div. 1995) Jenny Strömstedt (m. 2011)
- Partner: Agneta Sjödin (1997–2001)
- Children: 3
- Musical career
- Genres: Rock; pop
- Instruments: Vocals; guitar
- Labels: Capitol; Parlophone; Polar; WEA
- Formerly of: Triad
- Website: niklasstromstedt.se

Bo Anders Niklas Strömstedt (born 25 July 1958) is a Swedish singer, songwriter and actor.

== Early life ==
Bo Anders Niklas Strömstedt was born on 25 July 1958 in Lund, Sweden, to Gunhild Margareta (née Henriksson) and Bo Eugén Strömstedt. Strömstedt was raised in the Stockholm suburb of Hagsätra, alongside his younger sister, Lotten.

Strömstedt attended Adolf Fredrik's Music School.

== Career ==
Strömstedt played the keyboards on Ulf Lundell's recordings and tours from the late 1970s to the end of the 1980s.

In 1989, Strömstedt released his third studio album, En gång i livet.

Strömstedt's most recognised hit as a solo artist is the song "Om", reaching number one on the Swedish chart and Svensktoppen in 1990. He also had success with the album Halvvägs till framtiden released in 1992 with the hits "Oslagbara" and "Bilderna av dej". In 1994 he formed the music group GES with Orup and Anders Glenmark.

=== Melodifestivalen ===
Strömstedt wrote music and lyrics to "I morgon är en annan dag", with which Christer Björkman won Melodifestivalen 1992. In Melodifestivalen 2008 he participated himself as a wildcard in the fourth heat in Karlskrona. He finished last.

== Personal life ==
In 1985, Strömstedt married Efva Attling, a former model and jewellery designer. They had two children—Adam and Simon—born in 1987 and 1991, respectively.

He also has a child with Agneta Sjödin. Strömstedt married Jenny Strömstedt in Trosa on 16 July 2011.

== Other work ==
- He wrote the title song for the TV-series Nya tider on TV4 1999–2003.
- He wrote the Swedish lyrics for the musical Mamma Mia!.

== Discography ==
Solo

- Skjut inte... det är bara jag! (1981)
- Andra äventyr (1983)
- En gång i livet (1989)
- Om! (1990)
- Halvvägs till framtiden (1992)
- Långt liv i lycka (1997)
- Du blir du jag blir jag (2001)
- Två vägar (2008)

Triad

- Triad (1988)

Glenmark Eriksson Strömstedt

- Glenmark, Eriksson, Strömstedt (1995)
- Den andra skivan (2003)

== Filmography ==
=== Film ===
Year	Title	Role	Notes
2018	Ted: För kärlekens skull	Bo Strömstedt	Cameo

=== Television ===
Year	Title	Role	Notes
1967	Gumman som blev liten som en tesked	Bengt	TV series
1972	Stora skälvan	Tommy	TV series
2002	Rederiet	Roy Ramström	Episode: "Med flaggan i topp"
2017	Så mycket bättre	Himself	Reality TV show
2017–	Tillsammans med Strömstedts	Himself	Reality TV show

== Sources ==
- Arkhem, Helene (2016). Stora bonusfamiljboken. HarperCollins. ISBN 9789150919806.
