= The Shanes (Swedish band) =

Swedish rock band

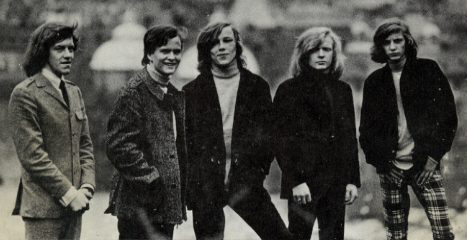

Background information
- Origin: Tuolluvaara, Sweden
- Genres: Rock and roll; garage rock; Merseybeat; pop rock; instrumental rock
- Years active: 1963–1969

The Shanes were a Swedish rock band active from 1963 to 1969.

The group played in a variety of British- and American-influenced styles, including British R&B, Merseybeat, and instrumental pop. They were successful in their home country, landing a string of top ten hit singles, including "Chris-Craft No. 9", which reached number 2 there in 1967. They released one single in the UK on Columbia Records, "I Don't Want Your Love", but it did not chart there. Some of their songs such as "No-Nox" were sponsored by Gulf Oil Corporation (who sold No-Nox as their premium gas).

== Members ==
- Lennart Grahn – vocals
- Tommy Wåhlberg – guitar, vocals
- Staffan Berggren – lead guitar, vocals
- Tor-Erik Rautio – drums
- Kit Sundqvist – keyboards, guitar, vocals
- Rolf Carvenius – saxophone
- Svante Elfgren – bass

== Discography ==
=== LPs ===
- Let Us Show You! (1964)
- The Shanegang (1965)
- Shanes Again! (1966)
- Ssss Shanes! (1967)
- VI (1967)

=== Swedish singles ===
Year	Song	B-side	Chart position		Album
Year	Song	B-side	Kvällstoppen	Tio I Topp	Album
1963	"Gunfight Saloon"	"The Ripper"	18	10	A: Let Us Show You! B: non-album
1963	"Pistoleros"	"Oh, Wow!"	—	—	A: non-album B: non-album
1964	"Gun Rider"	"Banzai"	—	—	A: non-album B: non-album
1964	"Keep-A-Knockin'"	"Come on Sally"	—	8	A: Let Us Show You! B: Let Us Show You!
1964	"Let Me Show You Who I Am"	"Say You Want Me"	10	1	A: Let Us Show You! B: Let Us Show You!
1965	"Georgia's Back In Town"	"My Lover Baby"	—	—	A: Let Us Show You! B: Let Us Show You!
1965	"I Don't Want Your Love"	"Sweet Little Rock'N'Roller"	—	4	A: non-album B: non-album
1965	"Crazy Country Hop"	"My New Yorker"	—	—	A: non-album B: non-album
1965	"Skinny Minnie"	"It's Allright Babe"	—	—	A: non-album B: non-album
1966	"Blue Feeling"	"Break Down"	6	6	A: The Shanegang B: non-album
1966	"I Don't Care Babe"	"I Like To Know"	—	15	A: non-album B: non-album
1966	"Hi-Lili, Hi-Lo"	"Dreamgirl"	2	2	A: Shanes Again! B: Shanes Again!
1966	"Can I Trust You"	"Like Before"	17	2	A: Ssss Shanes! B: non-album
1967	"Chris-Craft No. 9"	"Time"	4	2	A: Ssss Shanes! B: non-album
1967	"Drip-Drop"	"One Way To Love"	12	2	A: non-album B: non-album
1967	"Cara Mia"	"Without Your Love"	5	5	A: non-album B: non-album
1967	"Save The Last Dance For Me"	"Talkin' To Myself"	9	4	A: Ssss Shanes! B: non-album
1967	"Extra Kick!!!"	"No-Nox"	—	—	A: non-album B: non-album
1967	"Faces, Faces"	"It's No Use"	—	—	A: non-album B: VI
1968	"Friday Kind Of Monday"	"Bound For Nowhere"	—	—	A: non-album B: non-album

=== EPs ===
- Shanes-Moonlighters live! (1965; Columbia SEGS-138)
- Let Me Tell Yah (1966; Columbia SEGS-147)
- Hi-Lili, Hi-Lo (1966; La Voz De Su Amo [Spain] EPL-14.302)

=== Compilations ===
- The Best Of Shanes (1969)
- Shanes, 1963-68! (1983)
- Strictly Instrumental (1987)
- Hep Stars! Tages! Shanes! (1991)
- Bästa (1991)
- Hi Lili Hi Lo (1997)
- The Shanes (2000)
- The Shanes Original Album Series (2012)
- Let Them Show You: The Anthology 1964-1967 (2014)
