= List of number-one singles on Tio i Topp =

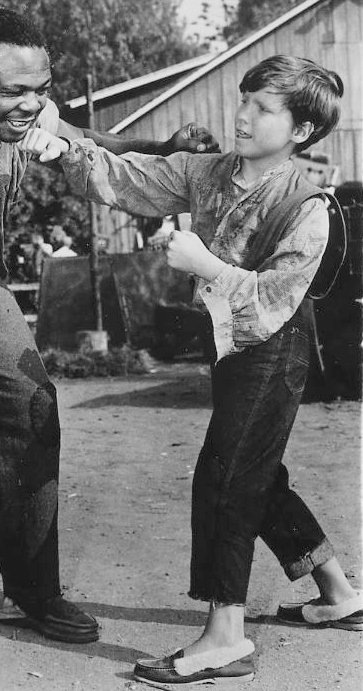
Eddie Hodges (right) had the first number-one single on the chart with "I'm Gonna Knock on Your Door" in 1961.

Tio i Topp was a radio program and record chart broadcast by Swedish public broadcaster Sveriges Radio as part of their music radio programming Melodiradion. (Note: Melodiradion was originally broadcast on both Sveriges Radio P1 and Sveriges Radio P2. When Sveriges Radio profiled their channels on 12 December 1966, it was moved to Sveriges Radio P3.) Broadcast almost every Saturday at 3:00 p.m. CET between 14 October 1961 and 29 June 1974, Tio i Topp was part of Sveriges Radio's direct combat against pirate radio stations Skånes Radio Mercur and Radio Nord, the latter of which had published their own record chart. Tio i Topp was Sveriges Radio's first singles chart, and was immensely popular with Sweden's youth. At the height of its popularity during the 1960s, Tio i Topp achieved upwards of 3.5 million listeners during each broadcast. By the early 1970s with the rise of the political musical progg movement, Tio i Topp received criticism for its supposed commercialistic nature which Sveriges Radio responded to by broadcasting the last edition of Tio i Topp in 1974.

In contrast to the Kvällstoppen chart which Sveriges Radio started broadcasting in 1962, Tio i Topp did not base its record chart on retail sales of singles. Instead, a jury of hundreds of teenagers in two or three Swedish towns (with Stockholm being a permanent jury city until 1967) listened to a large selection of newly released records weekly, utilizing a mentometer that was to be pressed when the song of their preference was played. The chart was compiled by collecting the mentometer data for each song. As such, Tio i Topp was prone to chart manipulation, as artists could persuade fans to vote for their new singles by doing public appearances in the towns appointed for jury duty prior to broadcasting. On 1 June 1968, the jury system was abolished, and instead the Swedish government agency Statistiska Centralbyrån (SCB) was tasked with selecting new jury members each week, who then cast their votes through the phone. Each summer between 1962 and 1966, Tio i Topp was rebranded and broadcast in a slightly different format as Sommartoppen, where only one jury from one town was counted in the compiling of the chart.

With 35 entries, British pop band the Beatles were Tio i Topp's most commercially successful act and had the most number-ones at 18. Amongst Swedish artists, pop bands Tages and Ola & the Janglers were the most successful, with 13 entries each. The Hep Stars were the Swedish act with the most number ones, at five. Spending ten weeks at number one during the autumn of 1970, "Lookin' out My Back Door" by Creedence Clearwater Revival was the longest-running number one. "Simon Says" (1967) by the 1910 Fruitgum Company and "Sleepy Joe" (1968) by Herman's Hermits both spent the longest time in the top ten, with 18 weeks each. The first song to reach number one on Tio i Topp was "I'm Gonna Knock on Your Door" by Eddie Hodges on 14 October 1961. The last number one was "Sugar Baby Love" by the Rubettes on 29 June 1974. In conjunction with the 20th anniversary of Melodiradion, Sveriges Radio revived Tio i Topp for a single one-off broadcast on 5 May 1981, utilizing the old mentometer system. "In the Air Tonight" by Phil Collins reached number one in the anniversary program.

== Chart history ==
Key

† Indicates it also reached number one on Kvällstoppen, a record chart published by Sveriges Radio that was sales-based
‡ Indicates Sommartoppen

=== 1961 ===
1961
No. (Note: The "No." column indicates the numerical sequence of number ones in Tio i Topp history. "Re" indicates a single returning to number one.)	Date	Jury cities	Song	Artist(s)	Reference
1	14 October	Stockholm and Malmö	"I'm Gonna Knock on Your Door"	Eddie Hodges	
1	21 October	Stockholm and Sundsvall	"I'm Gonna Knock on Your Door"	Eddie Hodges	
1	28 October	Stockholm and Norrköping	"I'm Gonna Knock on Your Door"	Eddie Hodges	
1	4 November	Stockholm and Luleå	"I'm Gonna Knock on Your Door"	Eddie Hodges	
2	11 November	Stockholm and Gothenburg	"Hit the Road Jack"	Ray Charles	
3	18 November	Stockholm and Östersund	"Who Put the Bomp"	The Viscounts	
4	25 November	Stockholm and Norrköping	"Sån't är livet"	Anita Lindblom	
4	2 December	Stockholm and Luleå	"Sån't är livet"	Anita Lindblom	
4	9 December	Stockholm and Malmö	"Sån't är livet"	Anita Lindblom	
4	16 December	Stockholm and Gothenburg	"Sån't är livet"	Anita Lindblom	
4	23 December	Stockholm and Sundsvall	"Sån't är livet"	Anita Lindblom	
5	30 December	Stockholm and Luleå	"Multiplication"	Bobby Darin	

=== 1962 ===
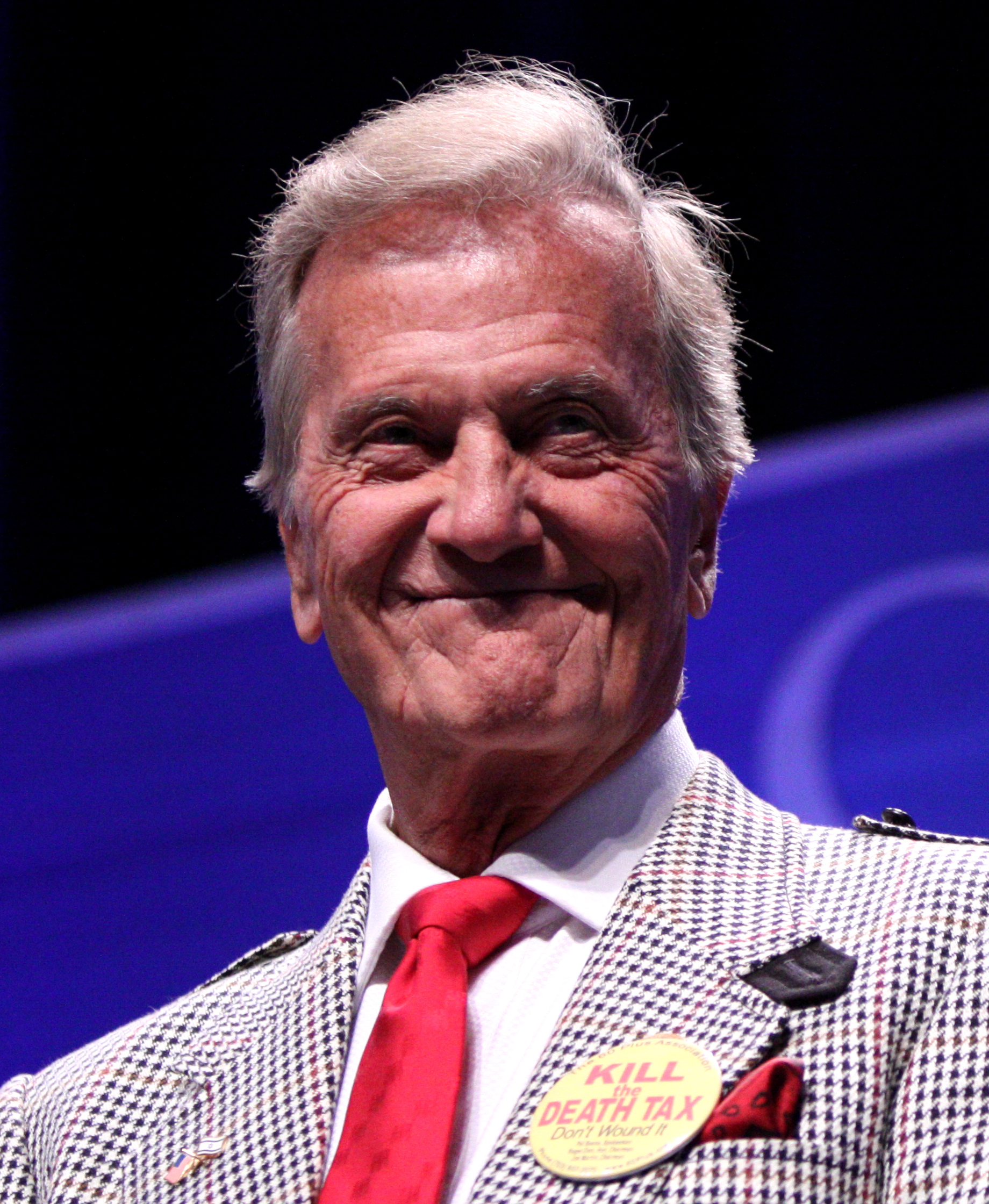
Pat Boone was at number one for six week with "Speedy Gonzales" during the summer of 1962.

1962
No.	Date	Jury cities	Song	Artist(s)	Reference
6	6 January	Stockholm and Malmö	"Midnight in Moscow"	Kenny Ball and his Jazzmen	
5 (re)	13 January	Stockholm and Gothenburg	"Multiplication"	Bobby Darin	
7	20 January	Stockholm and Sundsvall	"Let's Twist Again"	Chubby Checker	
7	27 January	Stockholm and Luleå	"Let's Twist Again"	Chubby Checker	
8	3 February	Stockholm and Malmö	"Mexico"	Bob Moore	
7 (re)	10 February	Stockholm and Gothenburg	"Let's Twist Again"	Chubby Checker	
7 (re)	17 February	Stockholm and Sundsvall	"Let's Twist Again"	Chubby Checker	
9	24 February	Stockholm and Luleå	"Happy José (Ching Ching)"	Jack Ross	
10	3 March	Stockholm and Malmö	"Walk On By"	Leroy Van Dyke	
10	10 March	Stockholm and Gothenburg	"Walk On By"	Leroy Van Dyke	
10	17 March	Stockholm and Sundsvall	"Walk On By"	Leroy Van Dyke	
10	24 March	Stockholm and Luleå	"Walk On By"	Leroy Van Dyke	
11	31 March	Stockholm and Malmö	"Good Luck Charm"	Elvis Presley	
11	7 April	Stockholm and Gothenburg	"Good Luck Charm"	Elvis Presley	
12	14 April	Stockholm and Sundsvall	"Chattanooga Choo Choo"	Floyd Cramer	
12	21 April	Stockholm and Luleå	"Chattanooga Choo Choo"	Floyd Cramer	
12	28 April	Stockholm and Malmö	"Chattanooga Choo Choo"	Floyd Cramer	
12	5 May	Stockholm and Gothenburg	"Chattanooga Choo Choo"	Floyd Cramer	
12	12 May	Stockholm and Sundsvall	"Chattanooga Choo Choo"	Floyd Cramer	
11 (re)	19 May	Stockholm and Luleå	"Good Luck Charm"	Elvis Presley	
13	26 May	Stockholm and Malmö	"Lesson One"	Russ Conway	
13	2 June	Stockholm and Gothenburg	"Lesson One"	Russ Conway	
13	9 June	Stockholm and Sundsvall	"Lesson One"	Russ Conway	
14	16 June	Motala ‡	"Caterina	Perry Como	
15	23 June	Karlstad ‡	"Luffarevisa"	Sven-Ingvars	
16	30 June	Umeå ‡	"Do You Want to Dance	Cliff Richard and the Shadows	
17	7 July	Kristianstad ‡	"Ginny Come Lately"	Brian Hyland	
18	14 July	Örebro ‡	"I Can't Stop Loving You" †	Ray Charles	
18	21 July	Hudiksvall ‡	"I Can't Stop Loving You" †	Ray Charles	
19	28 July	Borås ‡	"Speedy Gonzales" †	Pat Boone	
19	4 August	Skellefteå ‡	"Speedy Gonzales" †	Pat Boone	
19	11 August	Visby ‡	"Speedy Gonzales" †	Pat Boone	
19	18 August	Norrköping ‡	"Speedy Gonzales" †	Pat Boone	
19	25 August	Östersund ‡	"Speedy Gonzales" †	Pat Boone	
19	1 September	Stockholm and Malmö	"Speedy Gonzales" †	Pat Boone	
20	8 September	Stockholm and Umeå	"Dear One" †	Larry Finnegan	
20	15 September	Stockholm and Gothenburg	"Dear One" †	Larry Finnegan	
20	22 September	Stockholm and Sundsvall	"Dear One" †	Larry Finnegan	
21	29 September	Stockholm and Karlstad	"The Loco-Motion" †	Little Eva	
21	6 October	Stockholm and Luleå	"The Loco-Motion" †	Little Eva	
22	13 October	Stockholm and Norrköping	"Surfin' Safari" †	The Beach Boys	
22	20 October	Stockholm and Falun	"Surfin' Safari" †	The Beach Boys	
23	27 October	Stockholm and Växjö	"Twist à Saint-Tropez"	Les Chats Sauvages	
24	3 November	Stockholm and Östersund	"Let's Dance" †	Chris Montez	
24	10 November	Stockholm and Örebro	"Let's Dance" †	Chris Montez	
24	17 November	Stockholm and Malmö	"Let's Dance" †	Chris Montez	
25	24 November	Stockholm and Umeå	"Be-Bop-a-Lula"	Gene Vincent	
26	1 December	Stockholm and Gothenburg	"Murder She Says"	Ron Goodwin	
27	8 December	Stockholm and Sundsvall	"Bobby's Girl" †	Marcie Blane	
27	15 December	Stockholm and Karlstad	"Bobby's Girl" †	Marcie Blane	
28	22 December	Stockholm and Luleå	"Return to Sender" †	Elvis Presley	
28	29 December	Stockholm and Norrköping	"Return to Sender" †	Elvis Presley	

=== 1963 ===
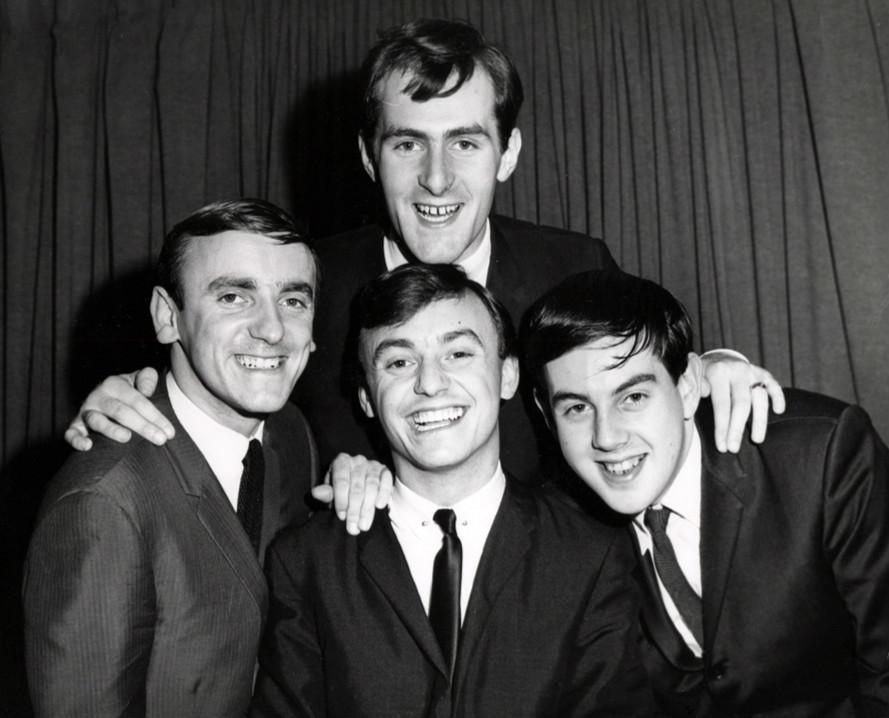
Gerry and the Pacemakers was the first merseybeat band to reach number one on Tio i Topp.

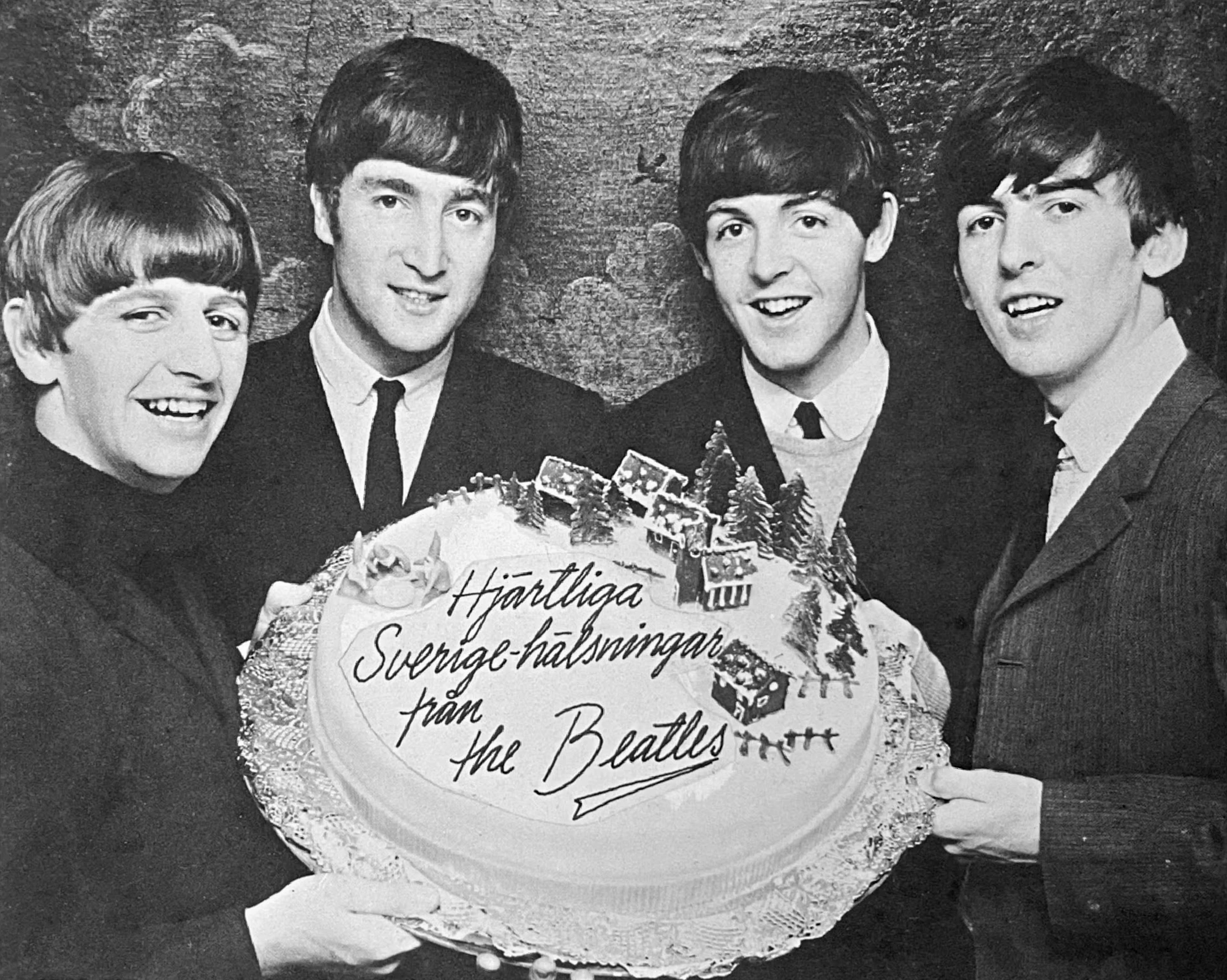
The Beatles had their first number one single with "She Loves You" in November 1963.

1963
No.	Date	Jury cities	Song	Artist(s)	Reference
28	5 January	Stockholm and Falun	"Return to Sender" †	Elvis Presley	
29	12 January	Stockholm and Växjö	"Stand Up" †	Michael Cox	
29	19 January	Stockholm and Östersund	"Stand Up" †	Michael Cox	
30	26 January	Stockholm and Örebro	"Bachelor Boy"	Cliff Richard and the Shadows	
30	2 February	Stockholm and Malmö	"Bachelor Boy"	Cliff Richard and the Shadows	
31	9 February	Stockholm and Umeå	"I Saw Linda Yesterday" †	Dickey Lee	
31	16 February	Stockholm and Gothenburg	"I Saw Linda Yesterday" †	Dickey Lee	
31	23 February	Stockholm and Sundsvall	"I Saw Linda Yesterday" †	Dickey Lee	
31	2 March	Stockholm and Karlstad	"I Saw Linda Yesterday" †	Dickey Lee	
31	9 March	Stockholm and Luleå	"I Saw Linda Yesterday" †	Dickey Lee	
32	16 March	Stockholm and Norrköping	"Hey Paula" †	Paul & Paula	
32	23 March	Stockholm and Falun	"Hey Paula" †	Paul & Paula	
33	30 March	Stockholm and Växsjö	"Blame It on the Bossa Nova" †	Eydie Gormé	
33	6 April	Stockholm and Östersund	"Blame It on the Bossa Nova" †	Eydie Gormé	
33	13 April	Stockholm and Örebro	"Blame It on the Bossa Nova" †	Eydie Gormé	
34	20 April	Stockholm and Malmö	"Greenback Dollar"	The Kingston Trio	
35	27 April	Stockholm and Umeå	"Cupboard Love"	John Leyton	
36	4 May	Stockholm and Gothenburg	"How Do You Do It?" †	Gerry and the Pacemakers	
36	11 May	Stockholm and Sundsvall	"How Do You Do It?" †	Gerry and the Pacemakers	
37	18 May	Stockholm and Karlstad	"Joshua Fit the Battle of Jericho"	Elvis Presley	
38	25 May	Stockholm and Luleå	"Sandy"	Dion DiMucci	
38	1 June	Stockholm and Norrköping	"Sandy"	Dion DiMucci	
39	8 June	Stockholm and Falun	"Lucky Lips" †	Cliff Richard and the Shadows	
39	15 June	Vänersborg ‡	"Lucky Lips" †	Cliff Richard and the Shadows	
39	22 June	Skellefteå ‡	"Lucky Lips" †	Cliff Richard and the Shadows	
39	29 June	Västerås ‡	"Lucky Lips" †	Cliff Richard and the Shadows	
39	6 July	Borgholm ‡	"Lucky Lips" †	Cliff Richard and the Shadows	
40	13 July	Arvika ‡	"Little Band of Gold"	James Gilreath	
41	20 July	Ystad ‡	"(You're the) Devil in Disguise" †	Elvis Presley	
41	27 July	Kiruna ‡	"(You're the) Devil in Disguise" †	Elvis Presley	
41	3 August	Nyköping ‡	"(You're the) Devil in Disguise" †	Elvis Presley	
41	10 August	Lycksele ‡	"(You're the) Devil in Disguise" †	Elvis Presley	
41	17 August	Jönköping ‡	"(You're the) Devil in Disguise" †	Elvis Presley	
41	24 August	Härnösand ‡	"(You're the) Devil in Disguise" †	Elvis Presley	
41	31 August	Visby ‡	"(You're the) Devil in Disguise" †	Elvis Presley	
41	7 September	Stockholm and Gävle	"(You're the) Devil in Disguise" †	Elvis Presley	
42	14 September	Stockholm and Örebro	"Just Like Eddie" †	Heinz Burt	
43	21 September	Stockholm and Kalmar	"Cottonfields"	Ace Cannon	
44	28 September	Stockholm and Karlstad	"L'amour s'en va"	Françoise Hardy	
45	5 October	Stockholm and Piteå	"My Whole World Is Falling Down"	Brenda Lee	
45	12 October	Stockholm and Norrköping	"My Whole World Is Falling Down"	Brenda Lee	
46	19 October	Stockholm and Varberg	"Detroit City" †	Bobby Bare	
47	26 October	Stockholm and Umeå	"If I Had a Hammer" †	Trini Lopez	
46 (re)	2 November	Stockholm and Kristianstad	"Detroit City" †	Bobby Bare	
48	9 November	Stockholm and Sundsvall	"She Loves You" †	The Beatles	
48	16 November	Stockholm and Uppsala	"She Loves You" †	The Beatles	
48	30 November	Stockholm and Eskilstuna	"She Loves You" †	The Beatles	
48	7 December	Stockholm and Växjö	"She Loves You" †	The Beatles	
49	14 December	Stockholm and Kristinehamn	"Diggity Doggety"	Streaplers	
48 (re)	21 December	Stockholm and Luleå	"She Loves You" †	The Beatles	
48 (re)	28 December	Stockholm and Linköping	"She Loves You" †	The Beatles	

- The voting that was to take place on 23 November 1963 in Stockholm and Falun was cancelled as Sveriges Radio held a memorial for United States president John F. Kennedy, who had been assassinated the day before.

=== 1964 ===
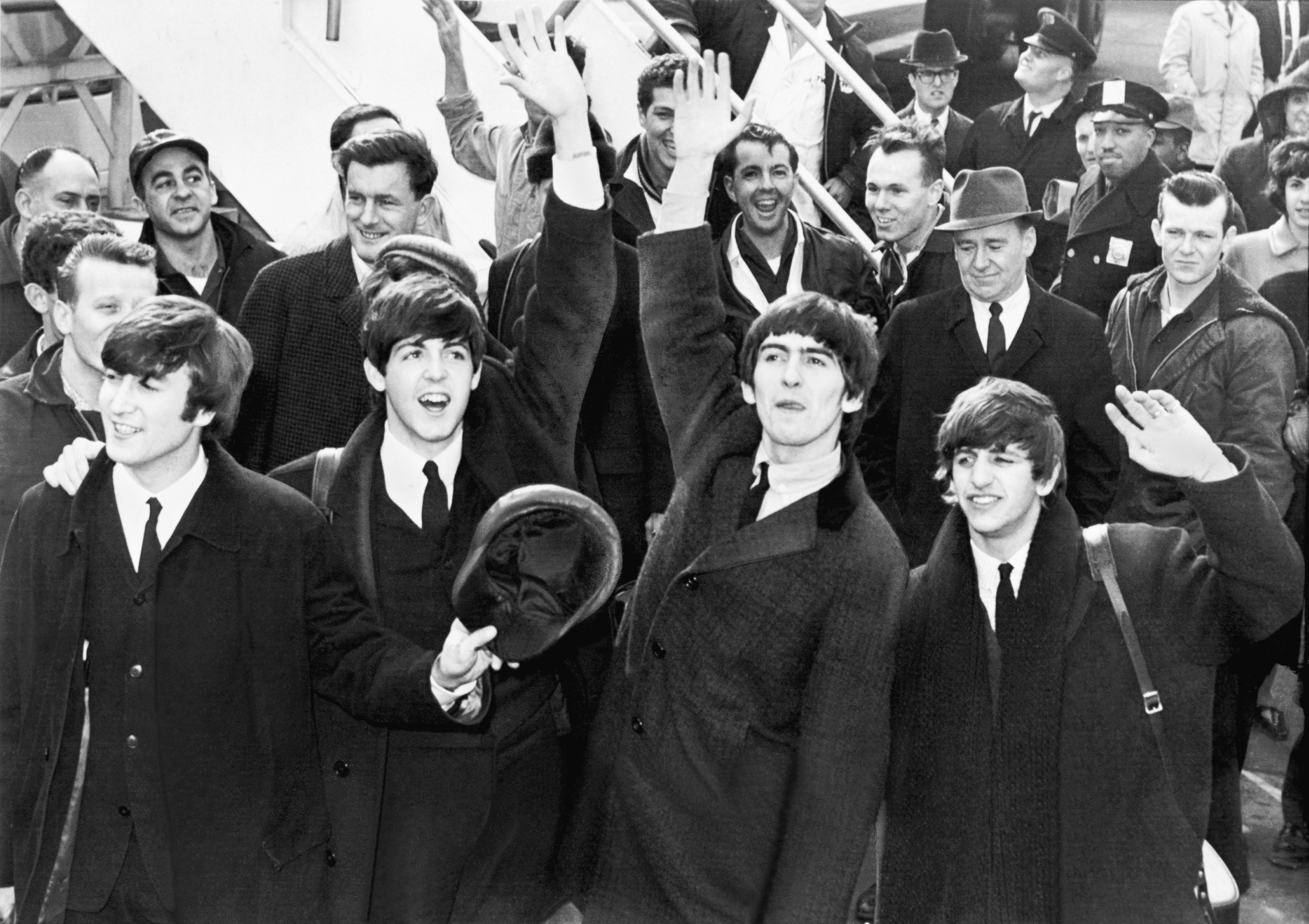
The Beatles had five number one hits on Tio i Topp in 1964, totalling 18 weeks.

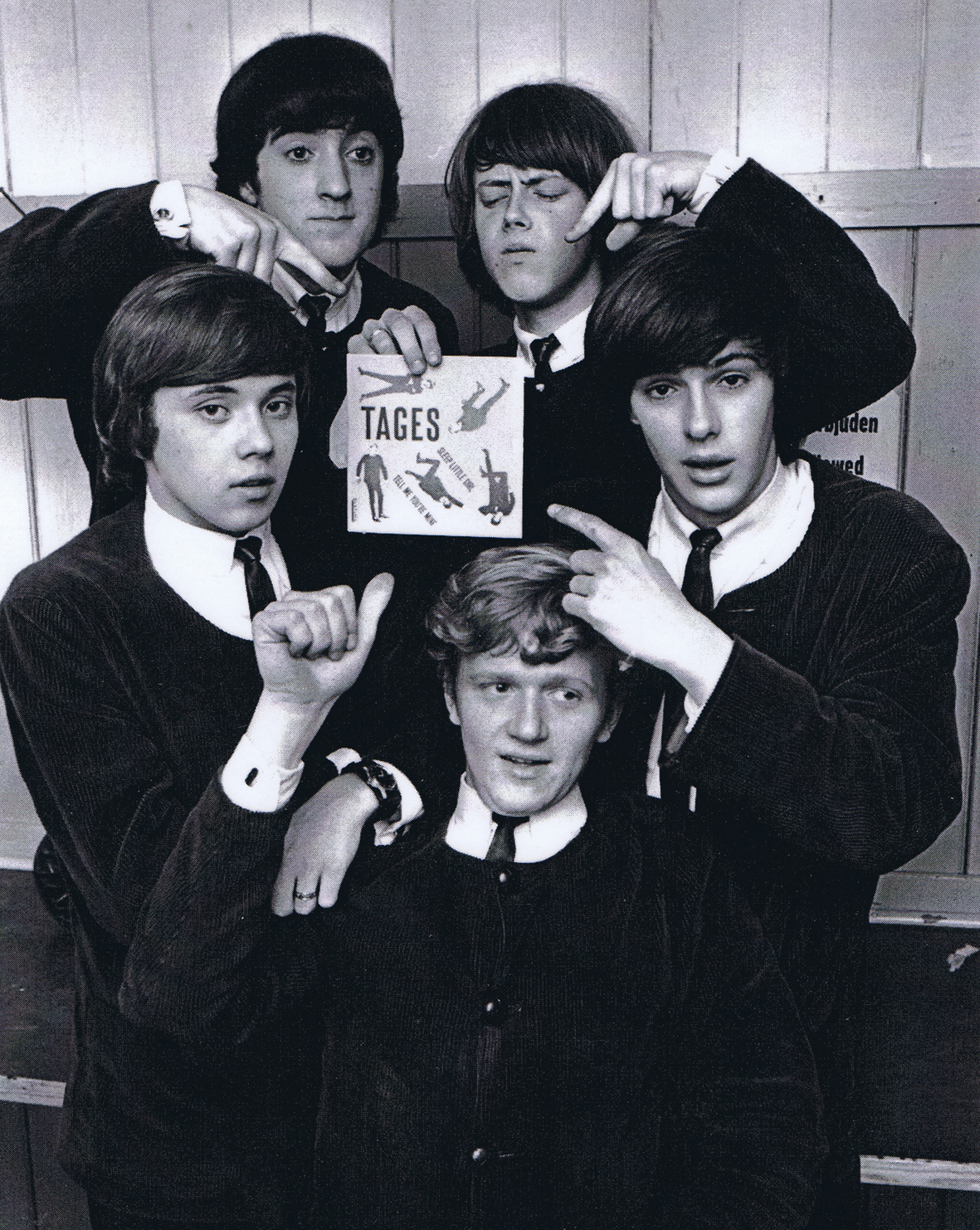
Tages posing with a copy of their debut single "Sleep Little Girl", which reached number one that year.

1964
No.	Date	Jury cities	Song	Artist(s)	Reference
50	4 January	Stockholm and Gothenburg	"I Want to Hold Your Hand" †	The Beatles	
50	11 January	Stockholm and Skellefteå	"I Want to Hold Your Hand" †	The Beatles	
50	18 January	Stockholm and Malmö	"I Want to Hold Your Hand" †	The Beatles	
50	25 January	Stockholm and Östersund	"I Want to Hold Your Hand" †	The Beatles	
51	1 February	Stockholm and Visby	"Hippy Hippy Shake" †	The Swinging Blue Jeans	
52	8 February	Stockholm and Falun	"Surfin' Bird"	The Trashmen	
53	15 February	Stockholm and Örebro	"All My Loving" †	The Beatles	
53	22 February	Stockholm and Jönköping	"All My Loving" †	The Beatles	
53	29 February	Stockholm and Karlstad	"All My Loving" †	The Beatles	
53	7 March	Stockholm and Kiruna	"All My Loving" †	The Beatles	
53	14 March	Stockholm and Norrköping	"All My Loving" †	The Beatles	
54	21 March	Stockholm and Halmstad	"Can't Buy Me Love" †	The Beatles	
55	28 March	Stockholm and Lycksele	"Bonnie B"	Jerry Lee Lewis	
54 (re)	4 April	Stockholm and Helsingborg	"Can't Buy Me Love" †	The Beatles	
54 (re)	11 April	Stockholm and Sundsvall	"Can't Buy Me Love" †	The Beatles	
56	18 April	Stockholm and Norrtälje	"California Sun"	The Rivieras	
56	25 April	Stockholm and Hedemora	"California Sun"	The Rivieras	
57	2 May	Stockholm and Västerås	"Suspicion" †	Terry Stafford	
57	9 May	Stockholm and Växjö	"Suspicion" †	Terry Stafford	
58	16 May	Stockholm and Arvika	"My Boy Lollipop" †	Millie Small	
59	23 May	Stockholm and Luleå	"Don't Throw Your Love Away"	The Searchers	
59	30 May	Stockholm and Nyköping	"Don't Throw Your Love Away"	The Searchers	
59	6 June	Stockholm and Gothenburg	"Don't Throw Your Love Away"	The Searchers	
60	13 June	Kungsbacka and Falkenberg ‡	"Tennessee Waltz" †	Alma Cogan	
60	20 June	Kiruna and Narvik ‡	"Tennessee Waltz" †	Alma Cogan	
60	27 June	Norrköping and Vimmerby ‡	"Tennessee Waltz" †	Alma Cogan	
60	4 July	Landskrona and Simrishamn ‡	"Tennessee Waltz" †	Alma Cogan	
60	11 July	Ludvika and Borlänge ‡	"Tennessee Waltz" †	Alma Cogan	
60	18 July	Vänersborg and Lysekil ‡	"Tennessee Waltz" †	Alma Cogan	
60	25 July	Lycksele and Umeå ‡	"Tennessee Waltz" †	Alma Cogan	
60	1 August	Oskarshamn and Eksjö ‡	"Tennessee Waltz" †	Alma Cogan	
61	8 August	Västerås and Uppsala ‡	"Ain't She Sweet"	The Beatles	
62	15 August	Hudiksvall and Söderhamn ‡	"Do Wah Diddy Diddy" †	Manfred Mann	
62	22 August	Jönköping and Tranås ‡	"Do Wah Diddy Diddy" †	Manfred Mann	
62	29 August	Filipstad and Kristinehamn ‡	"Do Wah Diddy Diddy" †	Manfred Mann	
62	5 September	Stockholm and Örnsköldsvik	"Do Wah Diddy Diddy" †	Manfred Mann	
63	12 September	Stockholm and Gothenburg	"A Hard Day's Night" †	The Beatles	
64	19 September	Stockholm and Boden	"Have I the Right?" †	The Honeycombs	
63 (re)	26 September	Stockholm and Malmö	"A Hard Day's Night" †	The Beatles	
65	3 October	Stockholm and Motala	"Oh, Pretty Woman" †	Roy Orbison	
66	10 October	Stockholm and Umeå	"I Should Have Known Better" †	The Beatles	
65 (re)	17 October	Stockholm and Köping	"Oh, Pretty Woman" †	Roy Orbison	
66 (re)	24 October	Stockholm and Växjö	"I Should Have Known Better" †	The Beatles	
66 (re)	31 October	Stockholm and Sandviken	"I Should Have Known Better" †	The Beatles	
66 (re)	7 November	Stockholm and Karlstad	"I Should Have Known Better" †	The Beatles	
66 (re)	14 November	Stockholm and Södertälje	"I Should Have Known Better" †	The Beatles	
66 (re)	21 November	Stockholm and Sundsvall	"I Should Have Known Better" †	The Beatles	
67	28 November	Stockholm and Skara	"Sleep Little Girl"	Tages	
68	5 December	Stockholm and Luleå	"Let Me Show You Who I Am"	The Shanes	
69	12 December	Stockholm and Karlskrona	"Tell Me" †	The Rolling Stones	
69	19 December	Stockholm and Norrköping	"Tell Me" †	The Rolling Stones	
69	26 December	Stockholm and Skellefteå	"Tell Me" †	The Rolling Stones	

=== 1965 ===
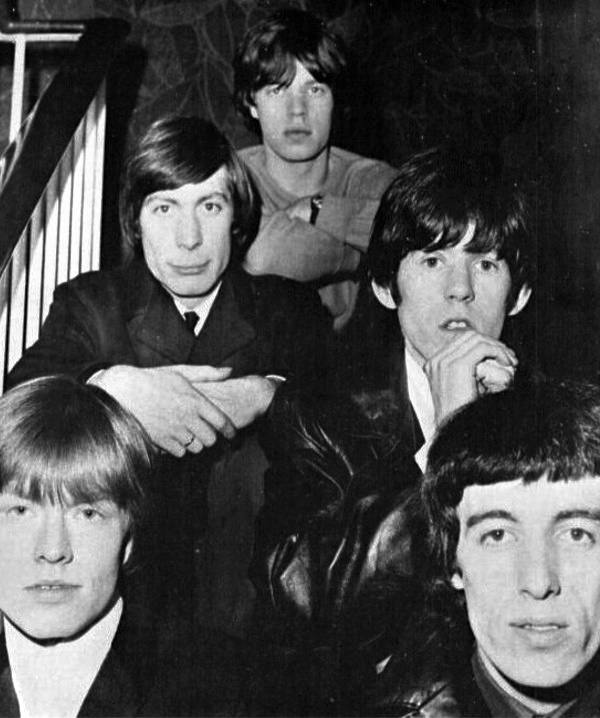
The Rolling Stones had three number-ones on Tio i Topp in 1965.

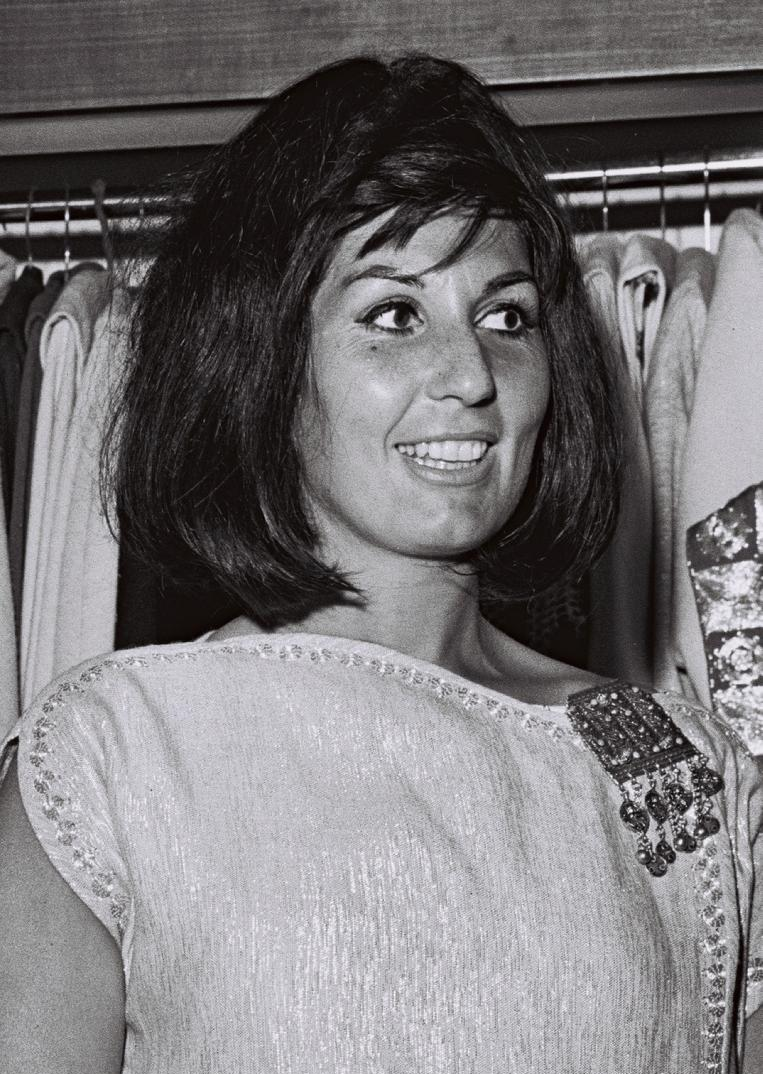
British singer Alma Cogan had her second number-one on Tio i Topp with "The Birds and the Bees" during the summer of 1965.

1965
No.	Date	Jury cities	Song	Artist(s)	Reference
69	2 January	Stockholm and Örebro	"Tell Me" †	The Rolling Stones	
69	9 January	Stockholm and Nybro	"Tell Me" †	The Rolling Stones	
69	16 January	Stockholm and Falun	"Tell Me" †	The Rolling Stones	
70	23 January	Stockholm and Hagfors	"That's The Way" †	The Honeycombs	
70	30 January	Stockholm and Visby	"That's The Way" †	The Honeycombs	
70	6 February	Stockholm and Bollnäs	"That's The Way" †	The Honeycombs	
71	13 February	Stockholm and Uddevalla	"Keep Searchin' (We'll Follow the Sun)"	Del Shannon	
72	20 February	Stockholm and Piteå	"Rock and Roll Music" †	The Beatles	
72	27 February	Stockholm and Hässleholm	"Rock and Roll Music" †	The Beatles	
72	6 March	Stockholm and Vimmerby	"Rock and Roll Music" †	The Beatles	
72	13 March	Stockholm and Vilhelmina	"Rock and Roll Music" †	The Beatles	
72	20 March	Stockholm and Strängnäs	"Rock and Roll Music" †	The Beatles	
72	27 March	Stockholm and Eksjö	"Rock and Roll Music" †	The Beatles	
72	4 April	Stockholm and Mora	"Rock and Roll Music" †	The Beatles	
73	10 April	Stockholm and Säffle	"The Last Time" †	The Rolling Stones	
74	17 April	Stockholm and Uppsala	"Cadillac" †	The Hep Stars	
73 (re)	24 April	Stockholm and Östersund	"The Last Time" †	The Rolling Stones	
75	1 May	Stockholm and Lidköping	"Ticket to Ride" †	The Beatles	
76	8 May	Stockholm and Gällivare	"Farmer John" †	The Hep Stars	
76	15 May	Stockholm and Sölvesborg	"Farmer John" †	The Hep Stars	
76	22 May	Stockholm and Katrineholm	"Farmer John" †	The Hep Stars	
76	29 May	Stockholm and Lycksele	"Farmer John" †	The Hep Stars	
77	5 June	Stockholm and Sala	"Bring It On Home to Me" †	The Animals	
78	12 June	Kalmar ‡	"Here Comes the Night"	Them	
77 (re)	19 June	Rättvik ‡	"Bring It On Home to Me" †	The Animals	
79	26 June	Laholm ‡	"The Birds and the Bees" †	Alma Cogan	
79	3 July	Kramfors ‡	"The Birds and the Bees" †	Alma Cogan	
80	10 July	Linköping ‡	"I'll Follow the Sun"	The Beatles	
81	17 July	Uddevalla ‡	"Bald Headed Woman" †	The Hep Stars	
81	24 July	Skellefteå ‡	"Bald Headed Woman" †	The Hep Stars	
81	31 July	Visby ‡	"Bald Headed Woman" †	The Hep Stars	
81	7 August	Karlstad ‡	"Bald Headed Woman" †	The Hep Stars	
82	14 August	Ronneby ‡	"Mr. Tambourine Man"	The Byrds	
82	21 August	Haparanda ‡	"Mr. Tambourine Man"	The Byrds	
83	28 August	Eskilstuna ‡	"(I Can't Get No) Satisfaction" †	The Rolling Stones	
83	4 September	Stockholm and Sundsvall	"(I Can't Get No) Satisfaction" †	The Rolling Stones	
83	11 September	Stockholm and Västervik	"(I Can't Get No) Satisfaction" †	The Rolling Stones	
83	18 September	Stockholm and Trelleborg	"(I Can't Get No) Satisfaction" †	The Rolling Stones	
83	25 September	Stockholm and Alingsås	"(I Can't Get No) Satisfaction" †	The Rolling Stones	
84	2 October	Stockholm and Skutskär	"Eve of Destruction" †	Barry McGuire	
84	9 October	Stockholm and Askersund	"Eve of Destruction" †	Barry McGuire	
84	16 October	Stockholm and Vännäs	"Eve of Destruction" †	Barry McGuire	
84	23 October	Stockholm and Hagfors	"Eve of Destruction" †	Barry McGuire	
85	30 October	Stockholm and Mjölby	"Yesterday" †	The Beatles	
85	6 November	Stockholm and Piteå	"Yesterday" †	The Beatles	
85	13 November	Stockholm and Helsingborg	"Yesterday" †	The Beatles	
85	27 November	Stockholm and Skövde	"Yesterday" †	The Beatles	
86	4 December	Stockholm and Värnamo	"Yesterday Man" †	Chris Andrews	
86	11 December	Stockholm and Östersund	"Yesterday Man" †	Chris Andrews	
86	18 December	Stockholm and Haparanda	"Yesterday Man" †	Chris Andrews	

- The voting that was to take place on 20 November 1965 was cancelled as Sveriges Radio broadcast a program known as Europatoppen in its place.
- The voting that was to take place on 25 December 1965 was cancelled as it was Christmas Day, a public holiday in Sweden.

=== 1966 ===
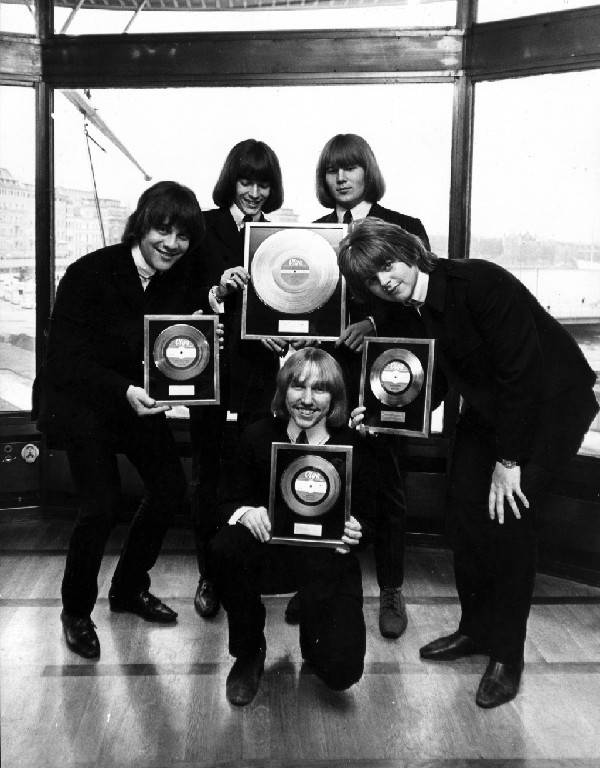
The Hep Stars had two number one singles on Tio i Topp for nine weeks, longer than any other artist that year.

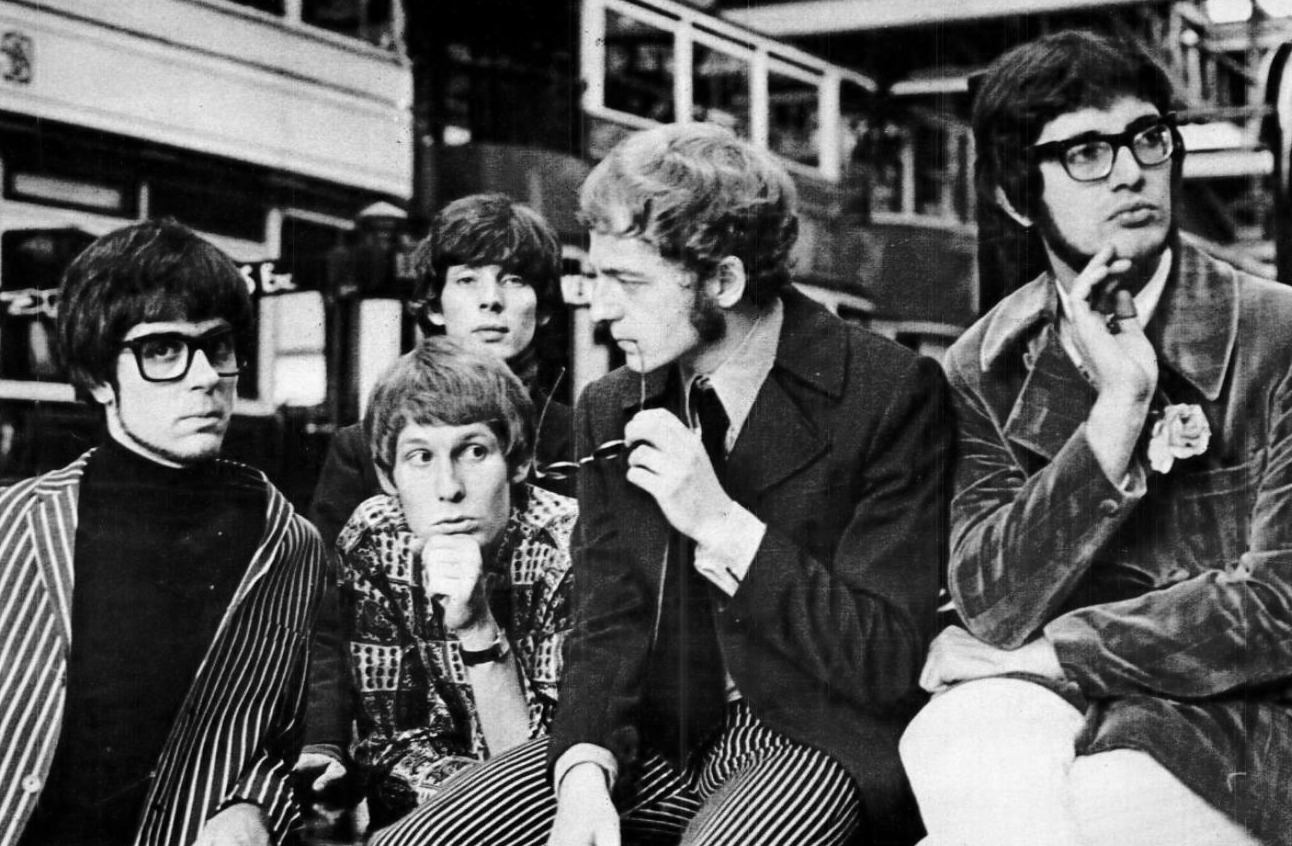
Manfred Mann were at number one for four weeks with "Just Like a Woman".

1966
No.	Date	Jury cities	Song	Artist(s)	Reference
87	1 January	Stockholm and Norrköping	"We Can Work It Out" †	The Beatles	
88	8 January (Note: Though the voting took place and a chart was published on 8 January 1966, the Tio i Topp radio producers later disqualified and nulled that week's list after it was revealed that the Lee Kings staged a voting coup by performing in Malung in order to secure a number-one spot for their single "Stop the Music".)	Stockholm and Malung	"Stop The Music"	Lenne and the Lee Kings	
87 (re)	15 January	Stockholm and Gothenburg	"We Can Work It Out" †	The Beatles	
87 (re)	22 January	Stockholm and Malmö	"We Can Work It Out" †	The Beatles	
89	29 January	Stockholm and Fagersta	"Till the End of the Day" / "A Well Respected Man"	The Kinks	
90	5 February	Stockholm and Lycksele	"Michelle" †	The Beatles	
90	12 February	Stockholm and Tranås	"Michelle" †	The Beatles	
90	19 February	Stockholm and Kumla	"Michelle" †	The Beatles	
90	26 February	Stockholm and Säffle	"Michelle" †	The Beatles	
90	5 March	Stockholm and Härnösand	"Michelle" †	The Beatles	
91	12 March	Stockholm and Filipstad	"These Boots Are Made for Walkin'" †	Nancy Sinatra	
92	19 March	Stockholm and Lund	"L. O. D. (Love On Delivery)"	Lenne and the Lee Kings	
93	26 March	Stockholm and Hofors	"Love Was On Your Mind"	Ola and the Janglers	
94	2 April	Stockholm and Borås	"Sunny Girl" †	The Hep Stars	
94	9 April	Stockholm and Söderköping	"Sunny Girl" †	The Hep Stars	
94	16 April	Stockholm and Kiruna	"Sunny Girl" †	The Hep Stars	
94	23 April	Stockholm and Nybro	"Sunny Girl" †	The Hep Stars	
95	30 April	Stockholm and Ånge	"You Don't Love Me"	Gary Walker	
94 (re)	7 May	Stockholm and Lysekil	"Sunny Girl" †	The Hep Stars	
94 (re)	14 May	Stockholm and Simrishamn	"Sunny Girl" †	The Hep Stars	
96	21 May	Stockholm and Umeå	"Wedding" †	The Hep Stars	
96	28 May	Stockholm and Kristinehamn	"Wedding" †	The Hep Stars	
96	4 June	Stockholm and Malung	"Wedding" †	The Hep Stars	
97	11 June	Eskilstuna ‡	"Very Last Day"	The Hollies	
97	18 June	Sundsvall ‡	"Very Last Day"	The Hollies	
97	25 June	Karlstad ‡	"Very Last Day"	The Hollies	
98	2 July	Trelleborg ‡	"Bald Headed Lena" †	The Lovin' Spoonful	
99	9 July	Boden ‡	"Bus Stop" †	The Hollies	
99	16 July	Visby ‡	"Bus Stop" †	The Hollies	
99	23 July	Karlshamn ‡	"Bus Stop" †	The Hollies	
100	30 July	Varberg ‡	"In My Dreams" †	Tages	
100	6 August	Mora ‡	"In My Dreams" †	Tages	
101	13 August	Västervik ‡	"With a Girl Like You"	The Troggs	
101	20 August	Lycksele ‡	"With a Girl Like You"	The Troggs	
102	27 August	Tranås ‡	"The End Of The World"	Mike Wallace and the Caretakers	
103	3 September	Stockholm, Malmö and Luleå (Note: From 3 September 1966 onwards, following the conclusion of Sommartoppen, Sveriges Radio started incorporating a third jury town in an attempt to combat voting coups.)	"Just Like a Woman" †	Manfred Mann	
103	10 September	Stockholm, Sundsvall and Gothenburg	"Just Like a Woman" †	Manfred Mann	
103	17 September	Stockholm, Karlstad and Norrköping	"Just Like a Woman" †	Manfred Mann	
103	24 September	Stockholm, Umeå and Örebro	"Just Like a Woman" †	Manfred Mann	
104	1 October	Stockholm, Borlänge and Växjö	"Poetry in Motion"	Ola and the Janglers	
105	8 October	Stockholm, Hässleholm and Piteå	"Little Man" †	Sonny & Cher	
105	15 October	Stockholm, Trollhättan and Leksand	"Little Man" †	Sonny & Cher	
105	22 October	Stockholm, Jokkmokk, Nybro	"Little Man" †	Sonny & Cher	
106	29 October	Stockholm, Filipstad and Linköping	"Dum Dum (Marble Breaks And Iron Bends)"	The Deejays	
106	5 November	Stockholm, Skellefteå and Askersund	"Dum Dum (Marble Breaks And Iron Bends)"	The Deejays	
106	12 November	Stockholm, Lund and Krylbo	"Dum Dum (Marble Breaks And Iron Bends)"	The Deejays	
107	26 November	Stockholm, Kristinehamn and Värnamo	"Puff, the Magic Dragon"	Fabulous Four	
107	3 December	Stockholm, Hudiksvall and Finspång	"Puff, the Magic Dragon"	Fabulous Four	
107	10 December	Stockholm, Åsele and Nora	"Puff, the Magic Dragon"	Fabulous Four	
108	17 December	Stockholm, Söderhamn and Borgholm	"Mellow Yellow"	Donovan	
109	31 December	Stockholm, Ystad and Haparanda	"Alex Is The Man" †	Ola and the Janglers	

- "Till the End of the Day" and "A Well Respected Man" by the Kinks were listed as joint number ones for the week of 29 January 1966.
- The voting that was to take place on 19 November 1966 was cancelled as Sveriges Radio broadcast a program known as Europatoppen in its place.
- The voting that was to take place on 24 December 1966 was cancelled as it was Christmas Eve, a holiday.
- 1966 was the last year to feature Sommartoppen, which would not return again.

=== 1967 ===
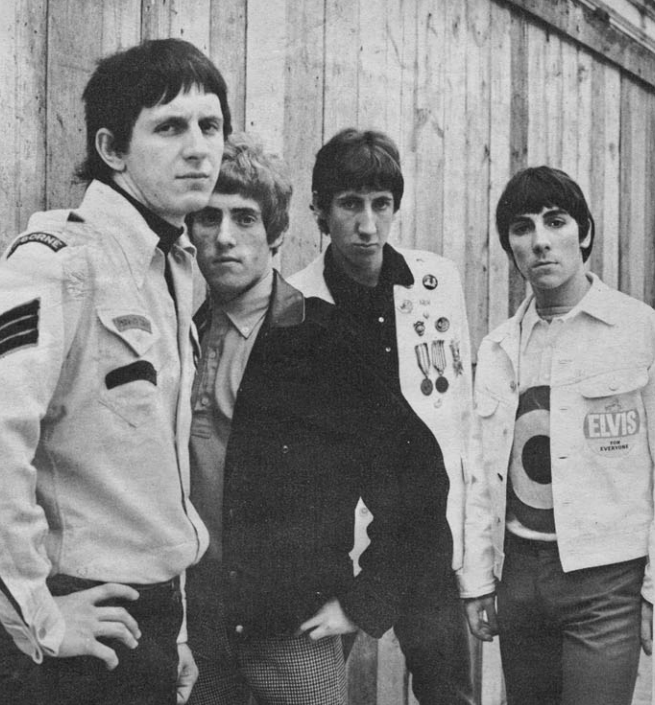
The Who had their only number-one song on Tio i Topp with "Bucket 'T'", an EP track from Ready Steady Who.

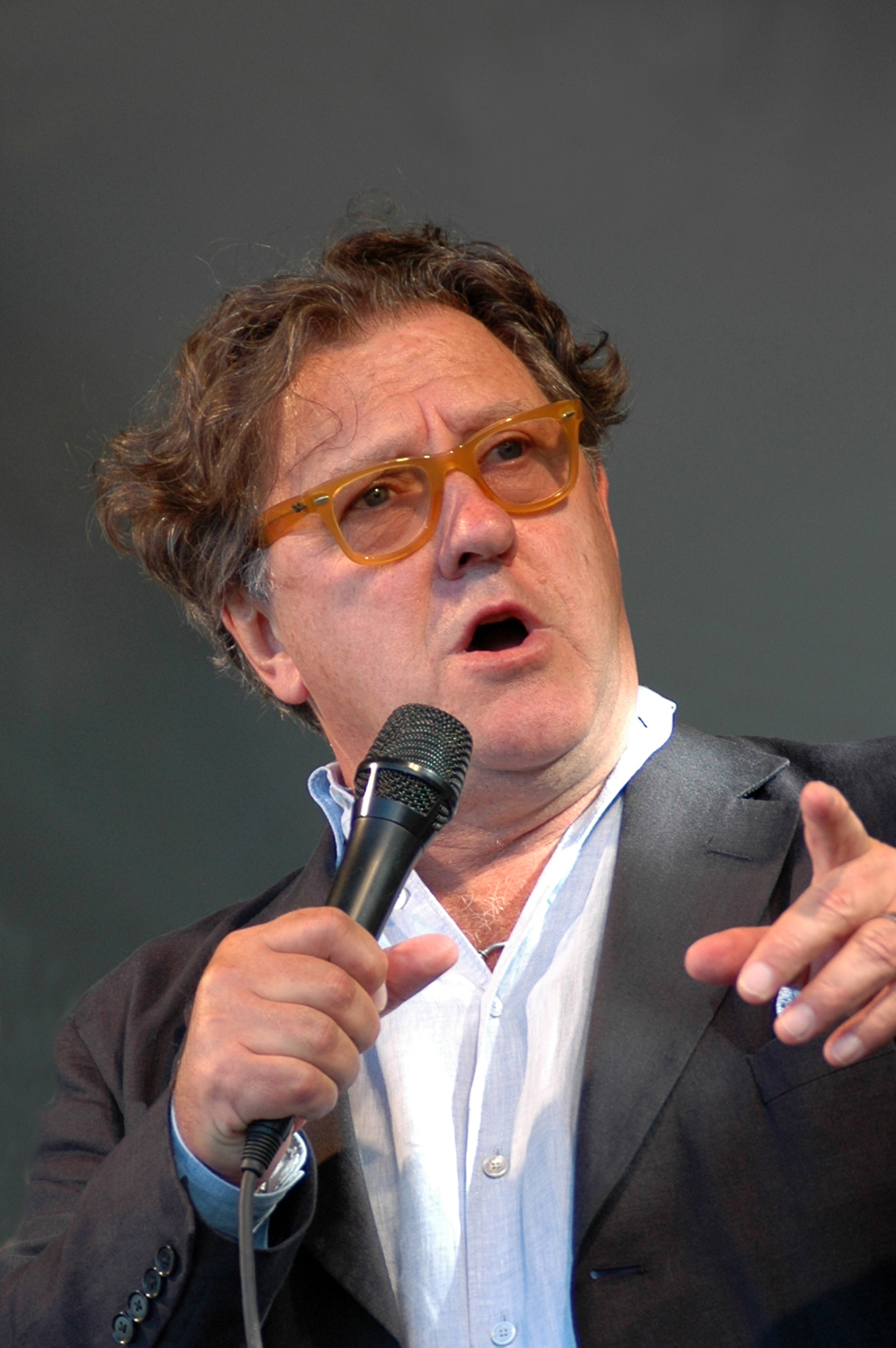
Tommy Körberg had one of his first and biggest hits with "Somebody's Taken Maria Away", which featured his backing band the Maniacs.

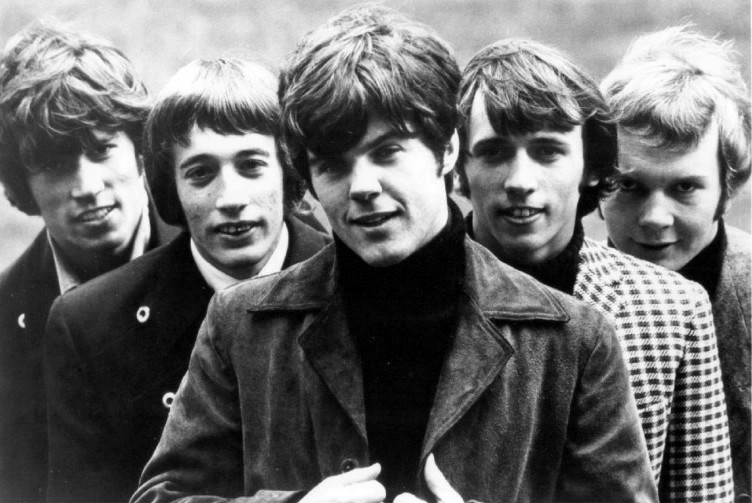
The Bee Gees had their first number-one single on Tio i Topp with "Massachusetts"

1967
No.	Date	Jury cities	Song	Artist(s)	Reference
110	7 January	Stockholm, Gävle and Falkenberg	"Sherry"	The Red Squares	
110	14 January	Stockholm, Vilhelmina and Sunne	"Sherry"	The Red Squares	
111	21 January	Stockholm, Junsele and Jönköping	"I'm a Believer" †	The Monkees	
111	28 January	Stockholm, Kristianstad and Skänninge	"I'm a Believer" †	The Monkees	
112	4 February	Stockholm, Hallstahammar and Östhammar	"Bucket 'T'" †	The Who	
112	11 February	Stockholm, Arvidsjaur and Ockelbo	"Bucket 'T'" †	The Who	
112	18 February	Stockholm, Gränna and Torsby	"Bucket 'T'" †	The Who	
113	25 February	Stockholm, Halmstad and Lycksele	"Penny Lane" †	The Beatles	
113	4 March	Stockholm, Ängelholm and Söderköping	"Penny Lane" †	The Beatles	
113	11 March	Stockholm, Arboga and Krokom	"Penny Lane" †	The Beatles	
114	18 March	Stockholm, Vansbro and Alingsås	"On a Carousel"	The Hollies	
114	25 March	Stockholm, Karlstad and Luleå	"On a Carousel"	The Hollies	
114	1 April	Stockholm, Mönsterås and Höganäs	"On a Carousel"	The Hollies	
115	8 April	Stockholm, Strömsund and Motala	"The Girl I Knew Somewhere" †	The Monkees	
115	15 April	Stockholm, Robertsfors and Hallsberg	"The Girl I Knew Somewhere" †	The Monkees	
115	22 April	Stockholm, Smedjebacken and Tidaholm	"The Girl I Knew Somewhere" †	The Monkees	
115	29 April	Stockholm, Boden and Tierp	"The Girl I Knew Somewhere" †	The Monkees	
116	6 May	Stockholm, Hagfors and Ljungby	"Baby Talk"	The Deejays	
116	13 May	Stockholm, Örebro and Sundsvall	"Baby Talk"	The Deejays	
116	20 May	Stockholm, Hörby and Oxelösund	"Baby Talk"	The Deejays	
116	27 May	Stockholm, Storvik and Boliden	"Baby Talk"	The Deejays	
117	3 June	Stockholm, Mölndal and Kalix	"The Lion Sleeps Tonight" †	The Hounds	
117	10 June	Stockholm, Åseda and Malmköping	"The Lion Sleeps Tonight" †	The Hounds	
117	17 June	Stockholm, Lycksele and Olofström	"The Lion Sleeps Tonight" †	The Hounds	
117	24 June	Stockholm, Falkenberg and Skoghall	"The Lion Sleeps Tonight" †	The Hounds	
118	1 July	Stockholm, Hudiksvall and Kungsör	"Carrie Anne"	The Hollies	
118	8 July	Stockholm, Falun and Visby	"Carrie Anne"	The Hollies	
118	15 July	Eskilstuna, Falsterbo and Piteå (Note: From 15 July 1967 onwards, Stockholm was disqualified as a permanent jury city when pop band Science Poption staged a voting coup to make their single "Buckingham Palace" a hit.)	"Carrie Anne"	The Hollies	
119	22 July	Mora, Västervik and Örnsköldsvik	"All You Need Is Love" †	The Beatles	
119	29 July	Borgholm, Helsingborg and Rättvik	"All You Need Is Love" †	The Beatles	
119	5 August	Arvika, Mölndal and Skellefteå	"All You Need Is Love" †	The Beatles	
119	12 August	Boden, Norrköping and Älmhult	"All You Need Is Love" †	The Beatles	
120	19 August	Landskrona, Karlskoga and Varberg	"San Francisco (Be Sure to Wear Flowers in Your Hair)" †	Scott McKenzie	
120	26 August	Kungsbacka, Sandviken and Vännäs	"San Francisco (Be Sure to Wear Flowers in Your Hair)" †	Scott McKenzie	
120	2 September	Stockholm, Västerås and Sundsvall	"San Francisco (Be Sure to Wear Flowers in Your Hair)" †	Scott McKenzie	
121	9 September	Jokkmokk, Leksand and Ronneby	"Somebody's Taken Maria Away" †	Tom & Mick & Maniacs	
121	16 September	Stockholm, Emmaboda and Hultsfred	"Somebody's Taken Maria Away" †	Tom & Mick & Maniacs	
121	23 September	Lycksele, Simrishamn and Skutskär	"Somebody's Taken Maria Away" †	Tom & Mick & Maniacs	
121	1 October	Järpen, Lammhult and Åtvidaberg	"Somebody's Taken Maria Away" †	Tom & Mick & Maniacs	
121	7 October	Kiruna, Kristinehamn and Lysekil	"Somebody's Taken Maria Away" †	Tom & Mick & Maniacs	
121	14 October	Köping, Nynäshamn and Åsele	"Somebody's Taken Maria Away" †	Tom & Mick & Maniacs	
122	21 October	Stockholm, Alingsås and Eslöv	"Thinkin' Ain't For Me"	Paul Jones	
123	28 October	Stockholm, Mjölby and Orsa	"Excerpt from A Teenage Opera"	Keith West	
124	4 November	Rimbo, Växjö and Älvsbyn	"Massachusetts" †	Bee Gees	
124	11 November	Ljusne, Torsby and Örebro	"Massachusetts" †	Bee Gees	
124	18 November	Stockholm, Ulricehamn and Säter	"Massachusetts" †	Bee Gees	
124	25 November	Laholm, Södertälje and Umeå	"Massachusetts" †	Bee Gees	
125	2 December	Malmberget, Nyköping and Tranås	"Hello, Goodbye †	The Beatles	
125	9 December	Stockholm, Bollnäs and Lindesberg	"Hello, Goodbye †	The Beatles	
125	16 December	Norrsundet, Säffle and Vaxholm	"Hello, Goodbye †	The Beatles	
125	23 December	Karlstad, Kisa and Luleå	"Hello, Goodbye †	The Beatles	
125	30 December	Stockholm, Gothenburg and Malmö	"Hello, Goodbye †	The Beatles	

=== 1968 ===
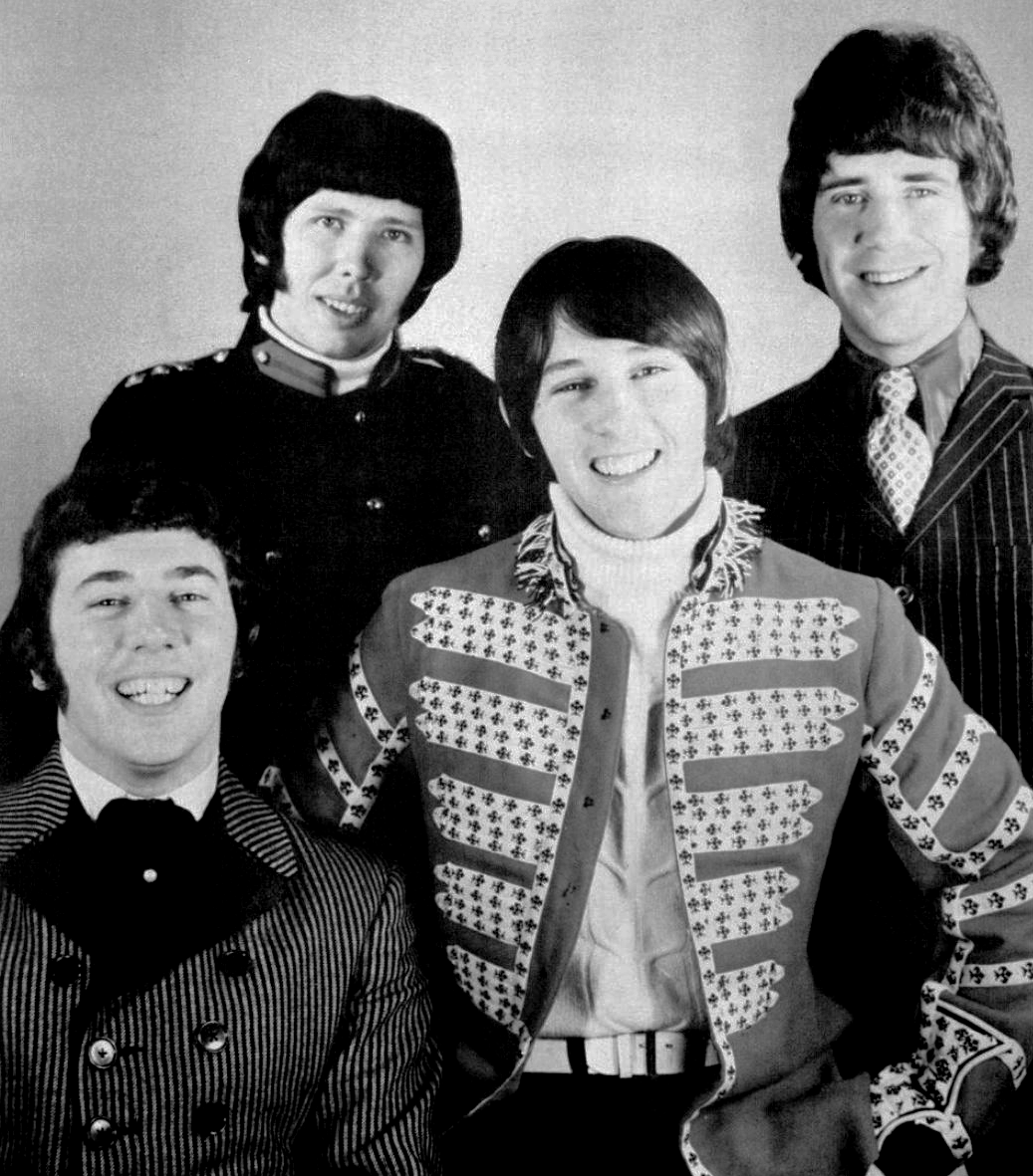
The Tremeloes had their only number one-song on Tio i Topp with "Suddenly You Love Me" in February.

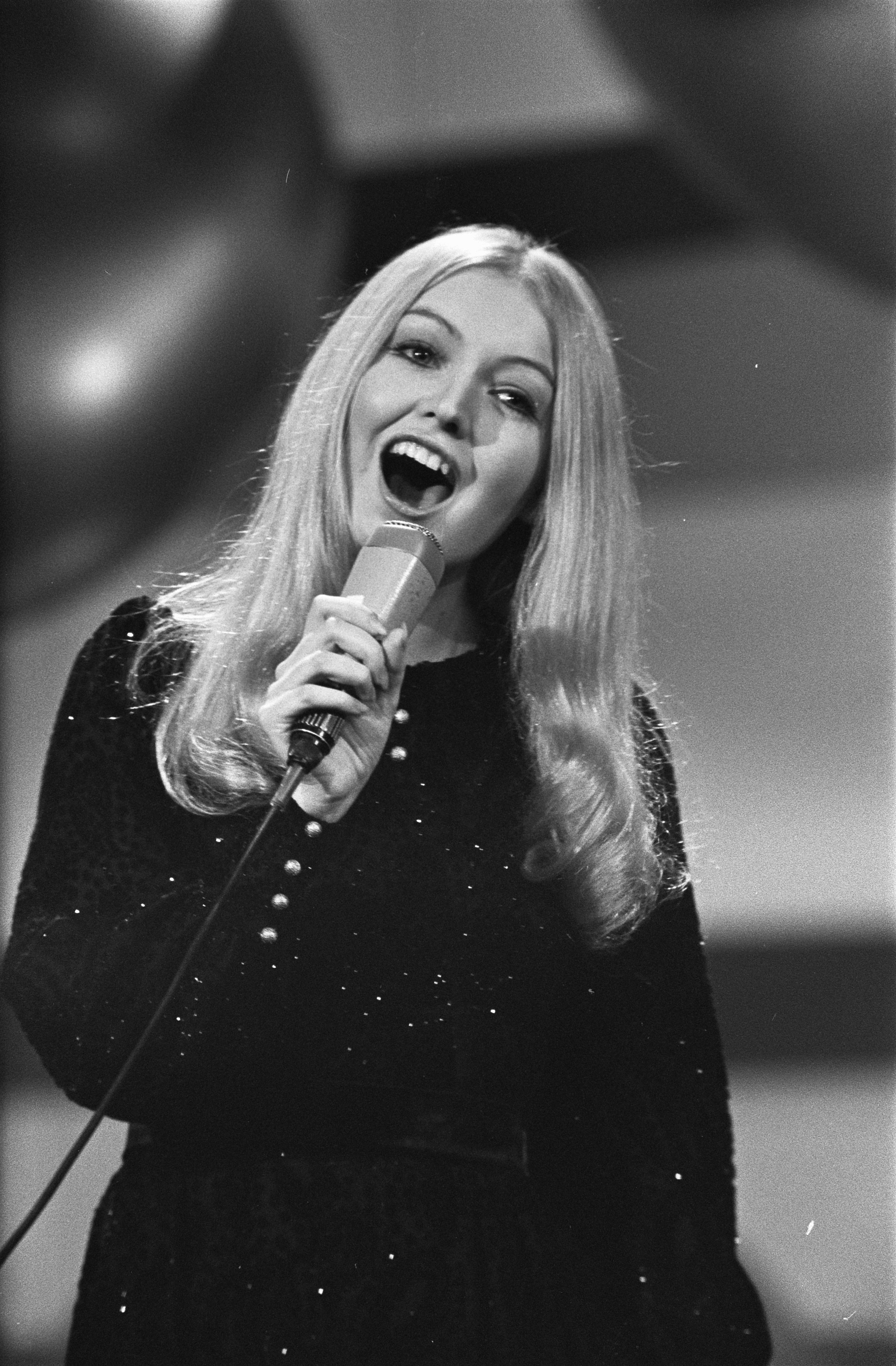
Mary Hopkin was at number one for three weeks during the autumn of 1968.

1968
No.	Date	Jury cities	Song	Artist(s)	Reference
125	6 January	Alvesta, Falun and Klippan	"Hello, Goodbye" †	The Beatles	
126	13 January	Jakobsberg, Härnösand and Oxelösund	"Dear Eloise"	The Hollies	
127	20 January	Stockholm, Borås and Örebro	"Spicks and Specks"	Bee Gees	
127	27 January	Stockholm, Robertsfors and Höganäs	"Spicks and Specks"	Bee Gees	
127	3 February	Stockholm, Arvika and Kalix	"Spicks and Specks"	Bee Gees	
128	10 February	Gothenburg, Leksand and Mönsterås	"Suddenly You Love Me"	The Tremeloes	
129	17 February	Enköping, Holmsund and Malmö	"Mighty Quinn" †	Manfred Mann	
129	24 February	Arboga, Sundsvall and Uppsala	"Mighty Quinn" †	Manfred Mann	
129	2 March	Gnesta, Gothenburg and Vallentuna	"Mighty Quinn" †	Manfred Mann	
129	9 March	Stockholm, Ludvika and Piteå	"Mighty Quinn" †	Manfred Mann	
130	16 March	Markaryd, Strömstad and Trelleborg	"The Legend of Xanadu"	Dave Dee, Dozy, Beaky, Mick & Tich	
130	23 March	Stockholm, Skoghall and Frövi	"The Legend of Xanadu"	Dave Dee, Dozy, Beaky, Mick & Tich	
131	30 March	Iggesund, Slite and Umeå	"Lady Madonna" †	The Beatles	
130 (re)	6 April	Stockholm, Falun and Köping	"The Legend of Xanadu"	Dave Dee, Dozy, Beaky, Mick & Tich	
131 (re)	13 April	Gothenburg, Karlstad and Linköping	"Lady Madonna" †	The Beatles	
132	20 April	Malmö, Skellefteå and Växjö	"Congratulations" †	Cliff Richard	
132	27 April	Stockholm, Kristinehamn and Sundsvall	"Congratulations" †	Cliff Richard	
132	4 May	Södertälje, Gothenburg and Piteå	"Congratulations" †	Cliff Richard	
133	11 May	Stockholm, Halmstad and Sandviken	"Jennifer Eccles"	The Hollies	
134	18 May	Norrköping, Malmö and Umeå	"Simon Says" †	1910 Fruitgum Company	
134	25 May	Stockholm, Kalmar and Visby	"Simon Says" †	1910 Fruitgum Company	
134	1 June	Jury cities abolished (Note: From 1 June 1968 onwards, the jury cities and voting system were abolished entirely; instead Sveriges Radio now relied on the government agency Statistiska Centralbyrån (SCB) to phone up teenagers across the country every week.)	"Simon Says" †	1910 Fruitgum Company	
134	8 June	Jury cities abolished	"Simon Says" †	1910 Fruitgum Company	
135	15 June	Jury cities abolished	"Things" †	Nancy Sinatra and Dean Martin	
135	22 June	Jury cities abolished	"Things" †	Nancy Sinatra and Dean Martin	
135	29 June	Jury cities abolished	"Things" †	Nancy Sinatra and Dean Martin	
135	6 July	Jury cities abolished	"Things" †	Nancy Sinatra and Dean Martin	
135	13 July	Jury cities abolished	"Things" †	Nancy Sinatra and Dean Martin	
135	20 July	Jury cities abolished	"Things" †	Nancy Sinatra and Dean Martin	
135	27 July	Jury cities abolished	"Things" †	Nancy Sinatra and Dean Martin	
136	3 August	Jury cities abolished	"Happy Birthday Sweet Sixteen" †	Flamingokvintetten	
136	10 August	Jury cities abolished	"Happy Birthday Sweet Sixteen" †	Flamingokvintetten	
136	17 August	Jury cities abolished	"Happy Birthday Sweet Sixteen" †	Flamingokvintetten	
137	24 August	Jury cities abolished	"Blue Eyes"	Don Partridge	
137	31 August	Jury cities abolished	"Blue Eyes"	Don Partridge	
137	7 September	Jury cities abolished	"Blue Eyes"	Don Partridge	
138	14 September	Jury cities abolished	"Hey Jude" †	The Beatles	
138	21 September	Jury cities abolished	"Hey Jude" †	The Beatles	
138	28 September	Jury cities abolished	"Hey Jude" †	The Beatles	
138	5 October	Jury cities abolished	"Hey Jude" †	The Beatles	
138	12 October	Jury cities abolished	"Hey Jude" †	The Beatles	
139	19 October	Jury cities abolished	"Those Were the Days" †	Mary Hopkin	
139	26 October	Jury cities abolished	"Those Were the Days" †	Mary Hopkin	
139	2 November	Jury cities abolished	"Those Were the Days" †	Mary Hopkin	
140	9 November	Jury cities abolished	"Let's Dance" †	Ola and the Janglers	
140	16 November	Jury cities abolished	"Let's Dance" †	Ola and the Janglers	
140	23 November	Jury cities abolished	"Let's Dance" †	Ola and the Janglers	
141	30 November	Jury cities abolished	"Little Arrows"	Leapy Lee	
141	7 December	Jury cities abolished	"Little Arrows"	Leapy Lee	
141	14 December	Jury cities abolished	"Little Arrows"	Leapy Lee	
141	21 December	Jury cities abolished	"Little Arrows"	Leapy Lee	
141	28 December	Jury cities abolished	"Little Arrows"	Leapy Lee	

=== 1969 ===
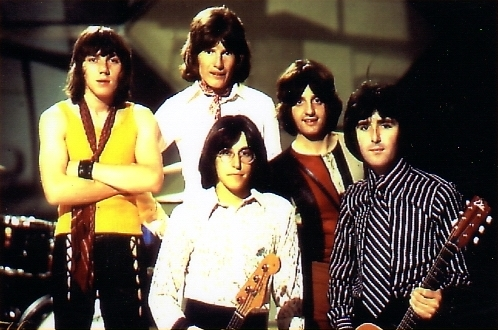
The Marmalade were the first artists to reach number one on Tio i Topp in 1969.

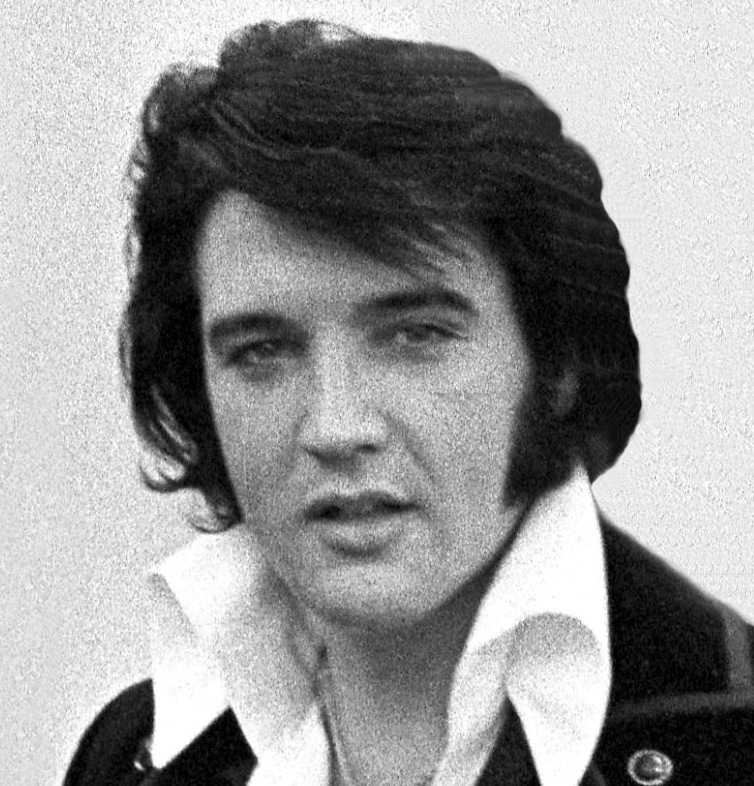
Elvis Presley had his last number-one single and biggest hit on Tio i Topp with "In the Ghetto" during the summer of 1969.

1969
No.	Date	Song	Artist(s)	Reference
142	4 January	"Ob-La-Di, Ob-La-Da" †	The Marmalade	
142	11 January	"Ob-La-Di, Ob-La-Da" †	The Marmalade	
142	18 January	"Ob-La-Di, Ob-La-Da" †	The Marmalade	
142	25 January	"Ob-La-Di, Ob-La-Da" †	The Marmalade	
142	1 February	"Ob-La-Di, Ob-La-Da" †	The Marmalade	
143	8 February	"Da Doo Ron Ron"	Claes Dieden	
143	15 February	"Da Doo Ron Ron"	Claes Dieden	
144	22 February	"One Way Ticket" †	Eleanor Bodel	
144	1 March	"One Way Ticket" †	Eleanor Bodel	
144	8 March	"One Way Ticket" †	Eleanor Bodel	
144	15 March	"One Way Ticket" †	Eleanor Bodel	
144	22 March	"One Way Ticket" †	Eleanor Bodel	
145	29 March	"Where Do You Go To (My Lovely)?" †	Peter Sarstedt	
145	5 April	"Where Do You Go To (My Lovely)?" †	Peter Sarstedt	
145	12 April	"Where Do You Go To (My Lovely)?" †	Peter Sarstedt	
146	19 April	"Boom Bang-a-Bang"	Lulu	
147	26 April	"Goodbye"	Mary Hopkin	
147	3 May	"Goodbye"	Mary Hopkin	
147	10 May	"Goodbye"	Mary Hopkin	
148	17 May	"I-Feel-Like-I'm-Fixin'-to-Die"	Country Joe and the Fish	
148	24 May	"I-Feel-Like-I'm-Fixin'-to-Die"	Country Joe and the Fish	
148	31 May	"I-Feel-Like-I'm-Fixin'-to-Die"	Country Joe and the Fish	
148	7 June	"I-Feel-Like-I'm-Fixin'-to-Die"	Country Joe and the Fish	
149	14 June	"Israelites"	Desmond Dekker And The Aces	
149	21 June	"Israelites"	Desmond Dekker And The Aces	
150	28 June	"In the Ghetto" †	Elvis Presley	
150	5 July	"In the Ghetto" †	Elvis Presley	
150	12 July	"In the Ghetto" †	Elvis Presley	
150	19 July	"In the Ghetto" †	Elvis Presley	
150	26 July	"In the Ghetto" †	Elvis Presley	
150	2 August	"In the Ghetto" †	Elvis Presley	
150	9 August	"In the Ghetto" †	Elvis Presley	
150	16 August	"In the Ghetto" †	Elvis Presley	
151	23 August	"In the Year 2525" †	Zager and Evans	
151	30 August	"In the Year 2525" †	Zager and Evans	
151	6 September	"In the Year 2525" †	Zager and Evans	
151	13 September	"In the Year 2525" †	Zager and Evans	
151	20 September	"In the Year 2525" †	Zager and Evans	
151	27 September	"In the Year 2525" †	Zager and Evans	
152	4 October	"Keep On"	Jerry Williams	
152	11 October	"Keep On"	Jerry Williams	
152	18 October	"Keep On"	Jerry Williams	
152	25 October	"Keep On"	Jerry Williams	
153	1 November	"Good Morning Starshine"	Oliver	
153	8 November	"Good Morning Starshine"	Oliver	
153	15 November	"Good Morning Starshine"	Oliver	
153	22 November	"Good Morning Starshine"	Oliver	
153	29 November	"Good Morning Starshine"	Oliver	
153	6 December	"Good Morning Starshine"	Oliver	
154	13 December	"Simple Song of Freedom"	Tim Hardin	
154	20 December	"Simple Song of Freedom"	Tim Hardin	
154	27 December	"Simple Song of Freedom"	Tim Hardin	

=== 1970 ===
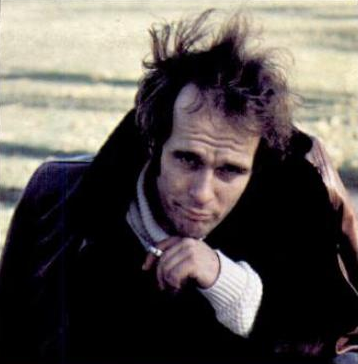
Tim Hardin had a long-runner on Tio i Topp with "Simple Song of Freedom"

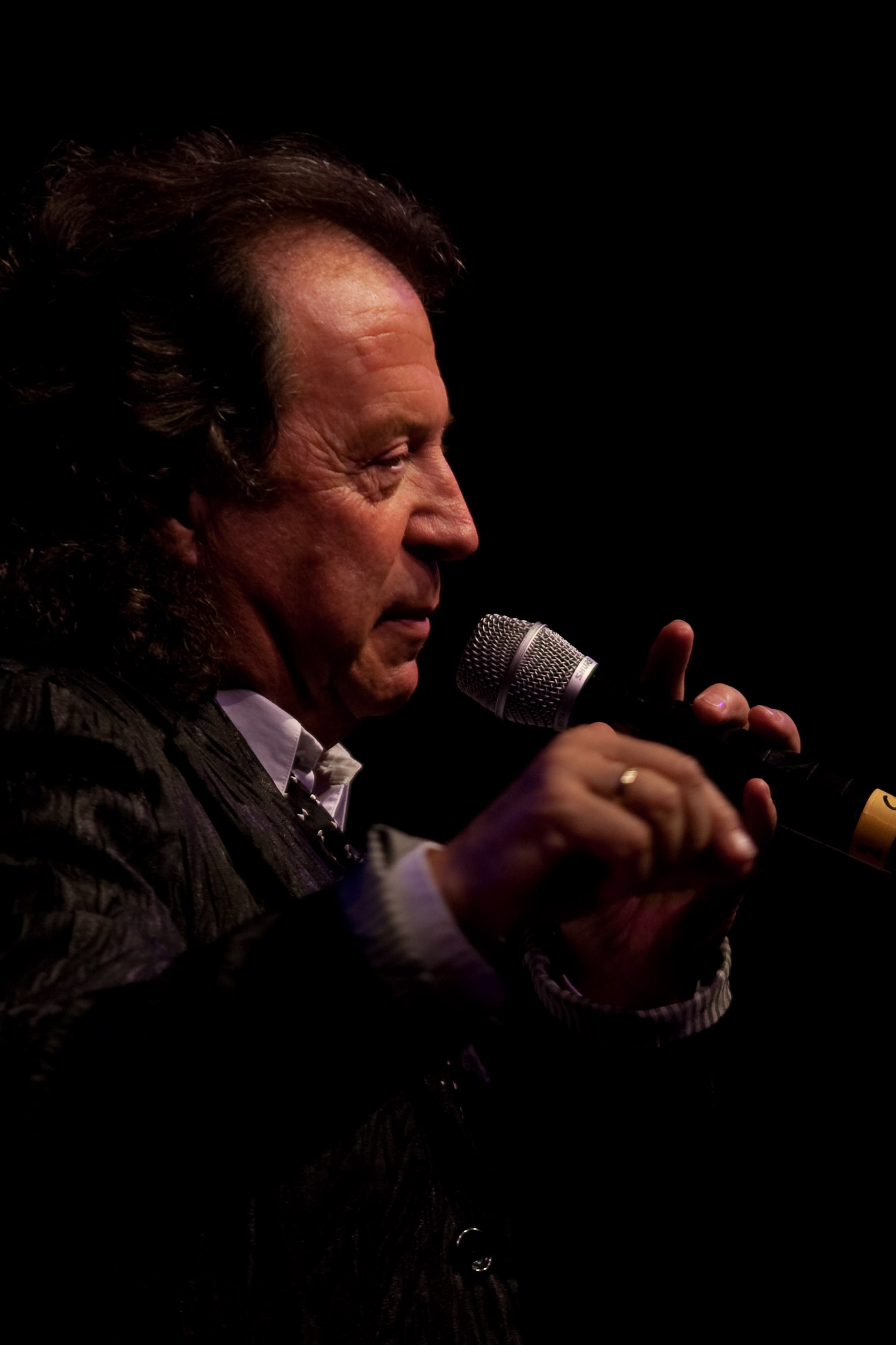
Chris Andrews was at number one for seven weeks with "Pretty Belinda".

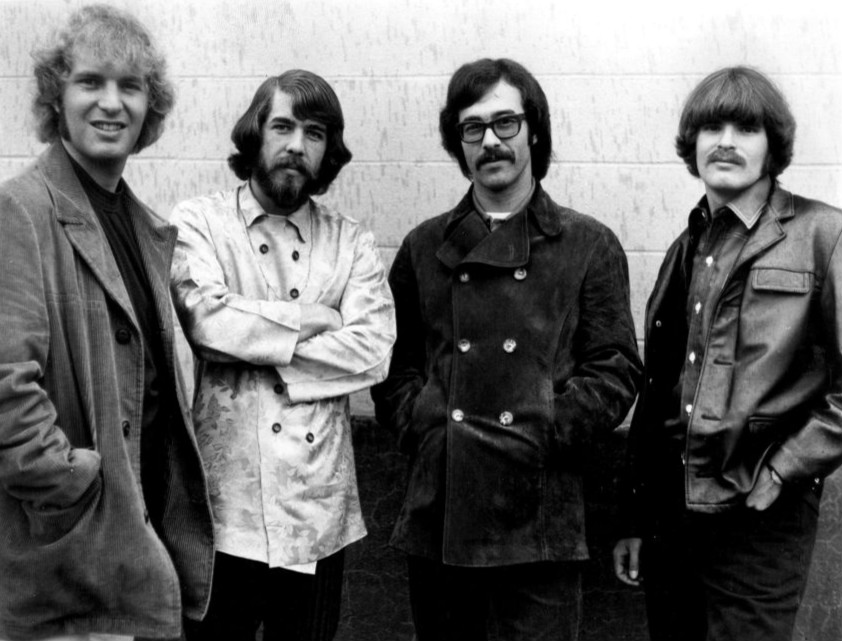
"Lookin' out My Back Door" by Creedence Clearwater Revival holds the record for being the longest number-one on Tio i Topp with ten weeks.

1970
No.	Date	Song	Artist(s)	Reference
154	3 January	"Simple Song of Freedom"	Tim Hardin	
154	10 January	"Simple Song of Freedom"	Tim Hardin	
154	17 January	"Simple Song of Freedom"	Tim Hardin	
155	24 January	"Maxwell's Silver Hammer"	George Howe	
155	31 January	"Maxwell's Silver Hammer"	George Howe	
156	7 February	"Walkin' Back to Happiness"	Suzie	
157	14 February	"All I Have to Do Is Dream"	Bobbie Gentry and Glen Campbell	
157	21 February	"All I Have to Do Is Dream"	Bobbie Gentry and Glen Campbell	
158	28 February	"Uppblåsbara Barbara" †	Robert Broberg	
158	7 March	"Uppblåsbara Barbara" †	Robert Broberg	
158	14 March	"Uppblåsbara Barbara" †	Robert Broberg	
159	21 March	"Love Grows (Where My Rosemary Goes)" †	Edison Lighthouse	
159	28 March	"Love Grows (Where My Rosemary Goes)" †	Edison Lighthouse	
159	4 April	"Love Grows (Where My Rosemary Goes)" †	Edison Lighthouse	
159	11 April	"Love Grows (Where My Rosemary Goes)" †	Edison Lighthouse	
159	18 April	"Love Grows (Where My Rosemary Goes)" †	Edison Lighthouse	
160	25 April	"Arizona"	Mark Lindsay	
160	2 May	"Arizona"	Mark Lindsay	
160	9 May	"Arizona"	Mark Lindsay	
161	16 May	"Pretty Belinda" †	Chris Andrews	
161	23 May	"Pretty Belinda" †	Chris Andrews	
161	30 May	"Pretty Belinda" †	Chris Andrews	
161	6 June	"Pretty Belinda" †	Chris Andrews	
161	13 June	"Pretty Belinda" †	Chris Andrews	
161	20 June	"Pretty Belinda" †	Chris Andrews	
161	27 June	"Pretty Belinda" †	Chris Andrews	
161	4 July	"Pretty Belinda" †	Chris Andrews	
162	11 July	"In the Summertime" †	Mungo Jerry	
162	18 July	"In the Summertime" †	Mungo Jerry	
162	25 July	"In the Summertime" †	Mungo Jerry	
162	1 August	"In the Summertime" †	Mungo Jerry	
163	8 August	"Cottonfields"	The Beach Boys	
163	15 August	"Cottonfields"	The Beach Boys	
164	22 August	"Today I Killed a Man I Didn't Know"	Roger James Cooke	
164	29 August	"Today I Killed a Man I Didn't Know"	Roger James Cooke	
164	5 September	"Today I Killed a Man I Didn't Know"	Roger James Cooke	
164	12 September	"Today I Killed a Man I Didn't Know"	Roger James Cooke	
165	19 September	"Lookin' out My Back Door"	Creedence Clearwater Revival	
165	26 September	"Lookin' out My Back Door"	Creedence Clearwater Revival	
165	3 October	"Lookin' out My Back Door"	Creedence Clearwater Revival	
165	10 October	"Lookin' out My Back Door"	Creedence Clearwater Revival	
165	17 October	"Lookin' out My Back Door"	Creedence Clearwater Revival	
165	24 October	"Lookin' out My Back Door"	Creedence Clearwater Revival	
165	31 October	"Lookin' out My Back Door"	Creedence Clearwater Revival	
165	7 November	"Lookin' out My Back Door"	Creedence Clearwater Revival	
165	14 November	"Lookin' out My Back Door"	Creedence Clearwater Revival	
165	21 November	"Lookin' out My Back Door"	Creedence Clearwater Revival	
166	28 November	"Cracklin' Rosie" †	Neil Diamond	
166	5 December	"Cracklin' Rosie" †	Neil Diamond	
166	12 December	"Cracklin' Rosie" †	Neil Diamond	
166	19 December	"Cracklin' Rosie" †	Neil Diamond	
166	26 December	"Cracklin' Rosie" †	Neil Diamond	

=== 1971 ===
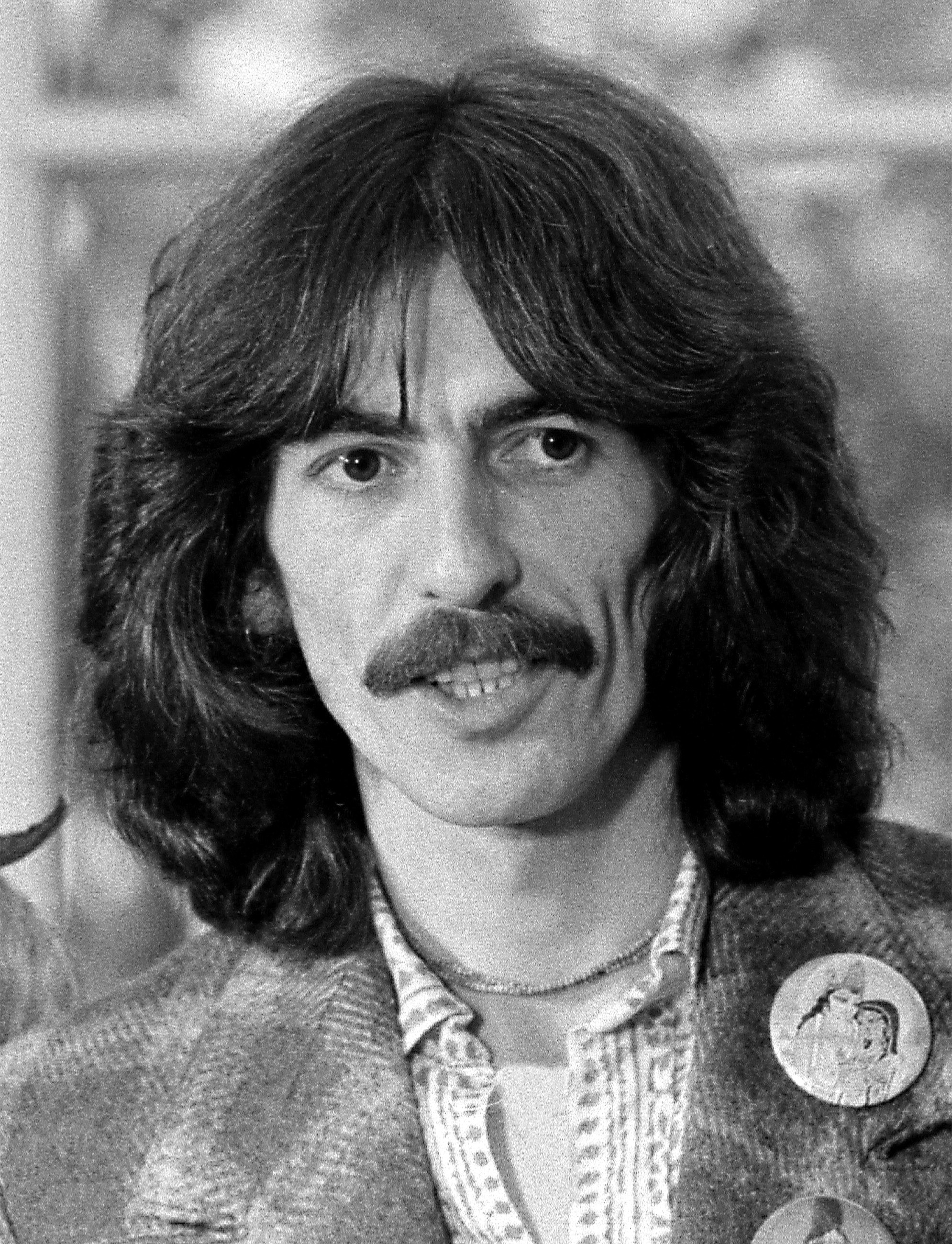
George Harrison had his only number-one song on Tio i Topp with "My Sweet Lord", which was at number one for seven weeks in the spring of 1971.

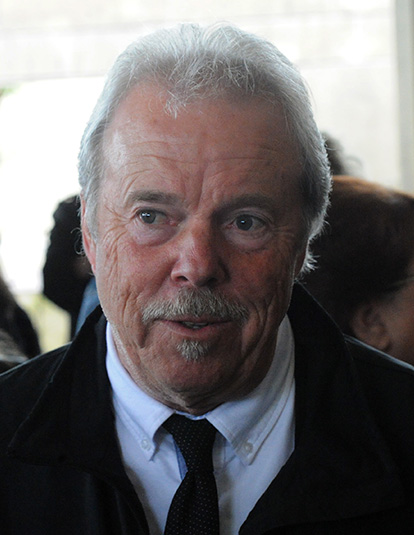
Lalla Hansson had his only Swedish hit single with "Anna och mej".

1971
No.	Date	Song	Artist(s)	Reference
167	2 January	"Candida" †	Tony Orlando and Dawn	
167	9 January	"Candida" †	Tony Orlando and Dawn	
167	16 January	"Candida" †	Tony Orlando and Dawn	
168	23 January	"My Sweet Lord" †	George Harrison	
168	30 January	"My Sweet Lord" †	George Harrison	
168	6 February	"My Sweet Lord" †	George Harrison	
168	13 February	"My Sweet Lord" †	George Harrison	
168	20 February	"My Sweet Lord" †	George Harrison	
168	27 February	"My Sweet Lord" †	George Harrison	
168	6 March	"My Sweet Lord" †	George Harrison	
169	13 March	"Rose Garden" †	Lynn Anderson	
169	20 March	"Rose Garden" †	Lynn Anderson	
169	27 March	"Rose Garden" †	Lynn Anderson	
169	3 April	"Rose Garden" †	Lynn Anderson	
170	10 April	"Chirpy Chirpy Cheep Cheep" †	Middle of the Road	
170	17 April	"Chirpy Chirpy Cheep Cheep" †	Middle of the Road	
170	24 April	"Chirpy Chirpy Cheep Cheep" †	Middle of the Road	
170	1 May	"Chirpy Chirpy Cheep Cheep" †	Middle of the Road	
171	8 May	"Un banc, un arbre, une rue" †	Séverine	
172	15 May	"Goin' Back to Indiana" †	The Jackson 5	
172	22 May	"Goin' Back to Indiana" †	The Jackson 5	
173	29 May	"Funny, Funny" †	The Sweet	
173	5 June	"Funny, Funny" †	The Sweet	
174	12 June	"Shake A Hand"	José Feliciano	
174	19 June	"Shake A Hand"	José Feliciano	
175	26 June	"Butterfly" †	Danyel Gérard	
175	3 July	"Butterfly" †	Danyel Gérard	
175	10 July	"Butterfly" †	Danyel Gérard	
175	17 July	"Butterfly" †	Danyel Gérard	
176	24 July	"Indian Reservation (The Lament of the Cherokee Reservation Indian)" †	The Raiders	
176	31 July	"Indian Reservation (The Lament of the Cherokee Reservation Indian)" †	The Raiders	
176	7 August	"Indian Reservation (The Lament of the Cherokee Reservation Indian)" †	The Raiders	
176	14 August	"Indian Reservation (The Lament of the Cherokee Reservation Indian)" †	The Raiders	
176	21 August	"Indian Reservation (The Lament of the Cherokee Reservation Indian)" †	The Raiders	
176	28 August	"Indian Reservation (The Lament of the Cherokee Reservation Indian)" †	The Raiders	
176	4 September	"Indian Reservation (The Lament of the Cherokee Reservation Indian)" †	The Raiders	
177	11 September	"Eat at Home"	Paul and Linda McCartney	
177	18 September	"Eat at Home"	Paul and Linda McCartney	
177	25 September	"Eat at Home"	Paul and Linda McCartney	
177	2 October	"Eat at Home"	Paul and Linda McCartney	
178	9 October	"Anna och mej" †	Lalla Hansson	
179	16 October	"Tom-Tom Turnaround"	New World	
179	23 October	"Tom-Tom Turnaround"	New World	
179	30 October	"Tom-Tom Turnaround"	New World	
179	6 November	"Tom-Tom Turnaround"	New World	
179	13 November	"Tom-Tom Turnaround"	New World	
180	20 November	"Mamy Blue" †	Pop-Tops	
180	27 November	"Mamy Blue" †	Pop-Tops	
181	4 December	"Soley Soley"	Middle of the Road	
181	11 December	"Soley Soley"	Middle of the Road	
181	18 December	"Soley Soley"	Middle of the Road	
181	26 December	"Soley Soley"	Middle of the Road	

=== 1972 ===
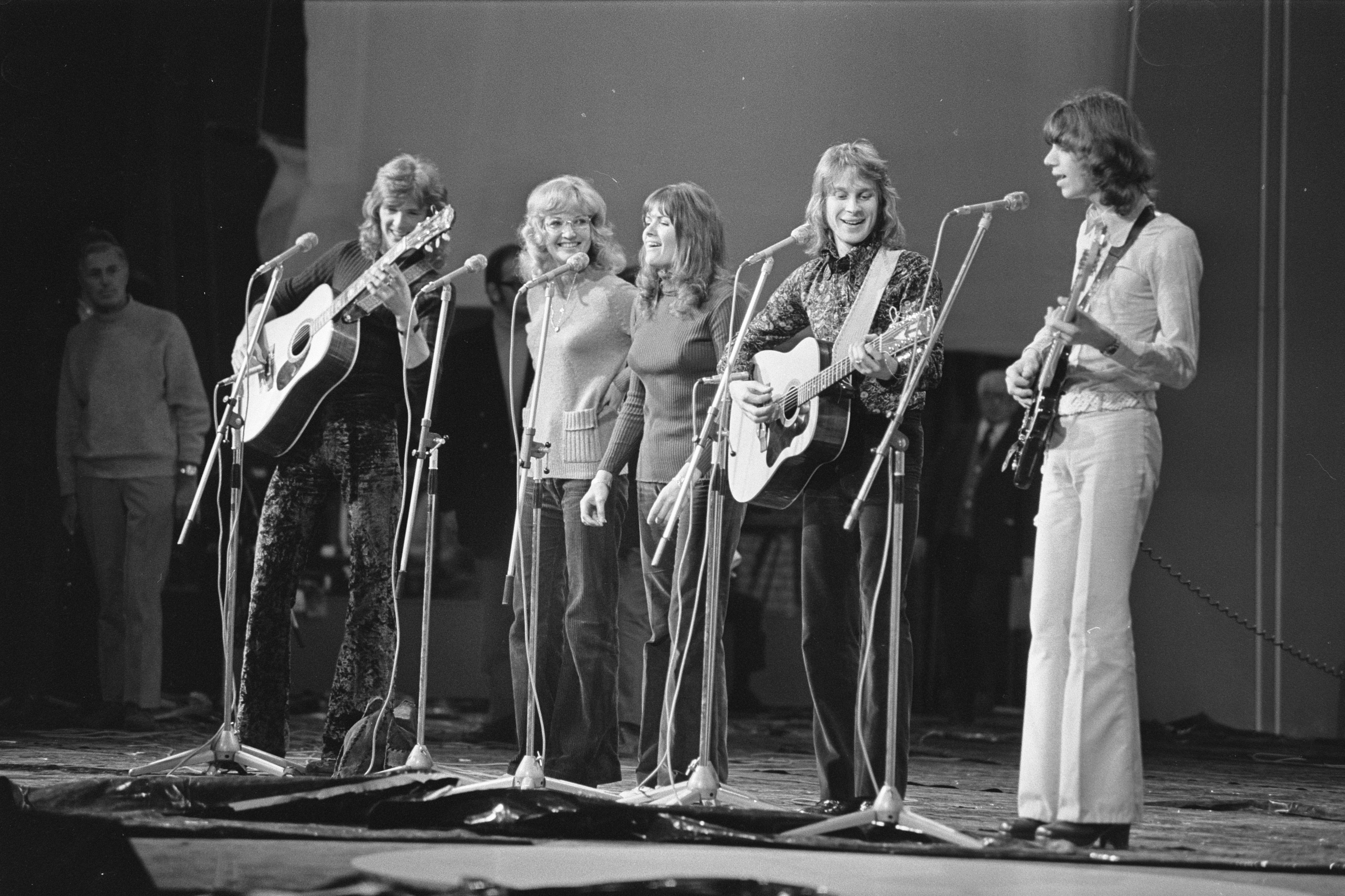
The New Seekers had two number-one songs totaling six weeks.

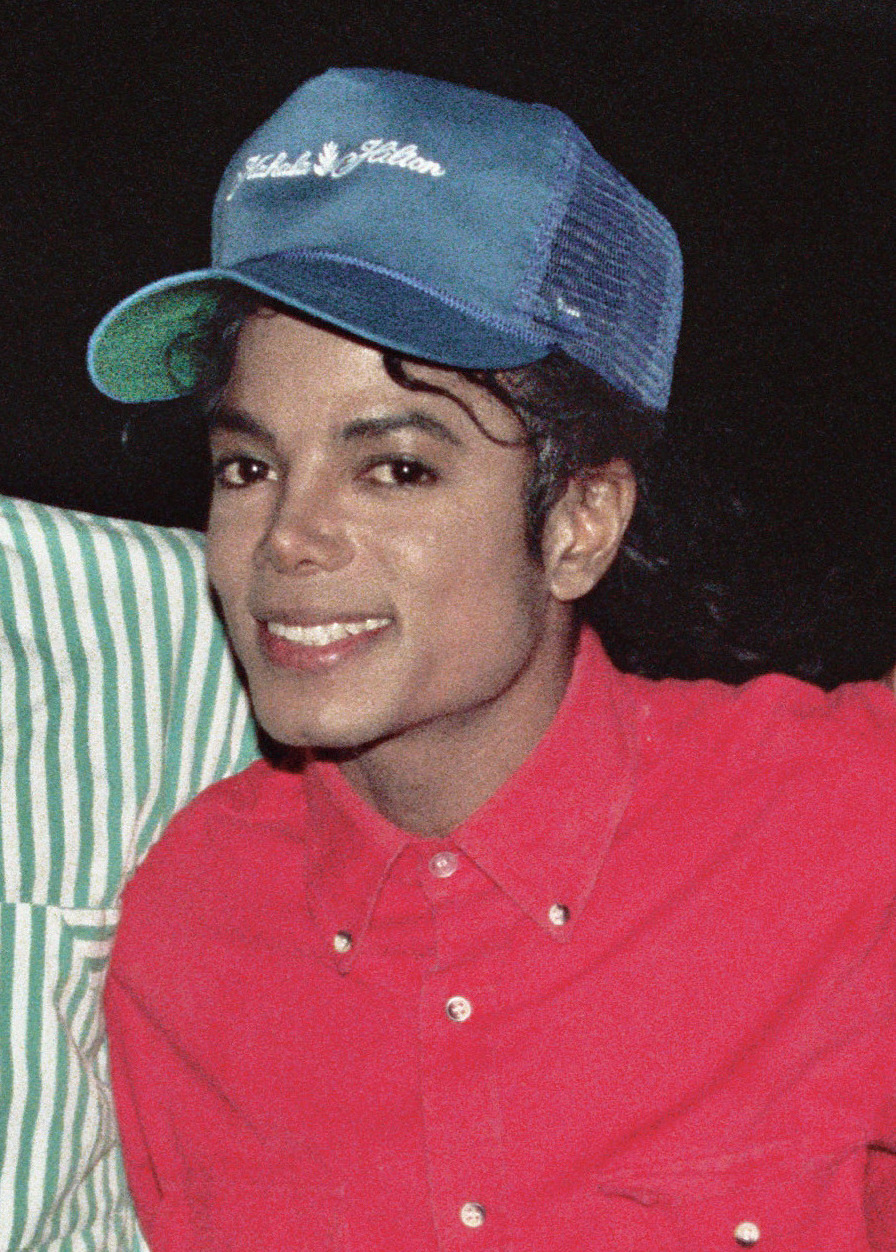
Michael Jackson had his first and only solo hit on Tio i Topp with "Rockin' Robin".

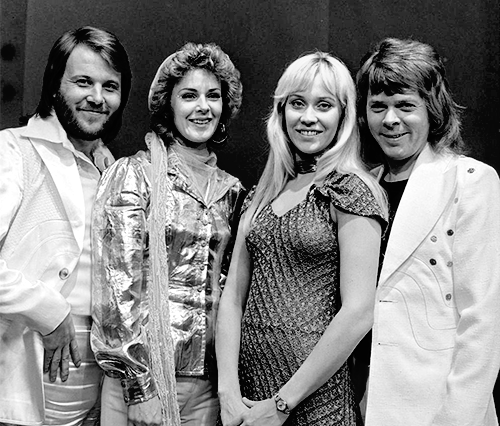
ABBA had their first Swedish number one with "He Is Your Brother" under the name Björn, Benny, Agnetha & Anni-Frid.

1972
No.	Date	Song	Artist(s)	Reference
181	2 January	"Soley Soley"	Middle of the Road	
181	8 January	"Soley Soley"	Middle of the Road	
181	15 January	"Soley Soley"	Middle of the Road	
181	22 January	"Soley Soley"	Middle of the Road	
182	29 January	"Help (Get Me Some Help)"	Tony Ronald	
182	5 February	"Help (Get Me Some Help)"	Tony Ronald	
182	12 February	"Help (Get Me Some Help)"	Tony Ronald	
183	19 February	"(Is This the Way to) Amarillo"	Tony Christie	
184	26 February	"Poppa Joe"	The Sweet	
183 (re)	4 March	"(Is This the Way to) Amarillo"	Tony Christie	
183 (re)	11 March	"(Is This the Way to) Amarillo"	Tony Christie	
183 (re)	18 March	"(Is This the Way to) Amarillo"	Tony Christie	
183 (re)	25 March	"(Is This the Way to) Amarillo"	Tony Christie	
183 (re)	1 April	"(Is This the Way to) Amarillo"	Tony Christie	
185	8 April	"I'd Like to Teach the World to Sing (In Perfect Harmony)"	The New Seekers	
186	15 April	"Son of My Father" †	Chicory Tip	
186	22 April	"Son of My Father" †	Chicory Tip	
187	29 April	"Beg, Steal or Borrow"	The New Seekers	
187	6 May	"Beg, Steal or Borrow"	The New Seekers	
187	13 May	"Beg, Steal or Borrow"	The New Seekers	
187	20 May	"Beg, Steal or Borrow"	The New Seekers	
188	27 May	"Down by the Lazy River"	The Osmonds	
187 (re)	3 June	"Beg, Steal or Borrow"	The New Seekers	
189	10 June	"Beautiful Sunday"	Daniel Boone	
188 (re)	17 June	"Down By The Lazy River"	The Osmonds	
190	24 June	"Rockin' Robin"	Michael Jackson	
190	1 July	"Rockin' Robin"	Michael Jackson	
190	8 July	"Rockin' Robin"	Michael Jackson	
191	15 July	"Sister Jane" †	New World	
189 (re)	22 July	"Beautiful Sunday"	Daniel Boone	
191 (re)	29 July	"Sister Jane" †	New World	
189 (re)	5 August	"Beautiful Sunday"	Daniel Boone	
189 (re)	12 August	"Beautiful Sunday"	Daniel Boone	
189 (re)	19 August	"Beautiful Sunday"	Daniel Boone	
192	26 August	"I've Found My Freedom"	Mac and Katie Kissoon	
191 (re)	2 September	"Sister Jane" †	New World	
192 (re)	9 September	"I've Found My Freedom"	Mac and Katie Kissoon	
192 (re)	16 September	"I've Found My Freedom"	Mac and Katie Kissoon	
192 (re)	23 September	"I've Found My Freedom"	Mac and Katie Kissoon	
193	30 September	"Hello-A" †	Mouth and MacNeal	
193	7 October	"Hello-A" †	Mouth and MacNeal	
193	14 October	"Hello-A" †	Mouth and MacNeal	
193	21 October	"Hello-A" †	Mouth and MacNeal	
194	28 October	"We Are Going Down Jordan"	Heritage	
195	4 November	"He's An Indian Cowboy In The Rodeo"	Buffy Sainte-Marie	
195	11 November	"He's An Indian Cowboy In The Rodeo"	Buffy Sainte-Marie	
195	18 November	"He's An Indian Cowboy In The Rodeo"	Buffy Sainte-Marie	
196	25 November	"Hey, You Love"	Mouth and MacNeal	
196	2 December	"Hey, You Love"	Mouth and MacNeal	
196	9 December	"Hey, You Love"	Mouth and MacNeal	
197	16 December	"Mouldy Old Dough"	Lieutenant Pigeon	
198	23 December	"A Teenager in Love"	Donny Osmond	
199	30 December	"He Is Your Brother	Björn, Benny, Agnetha & Anni-Frid	

=== 1973 ===
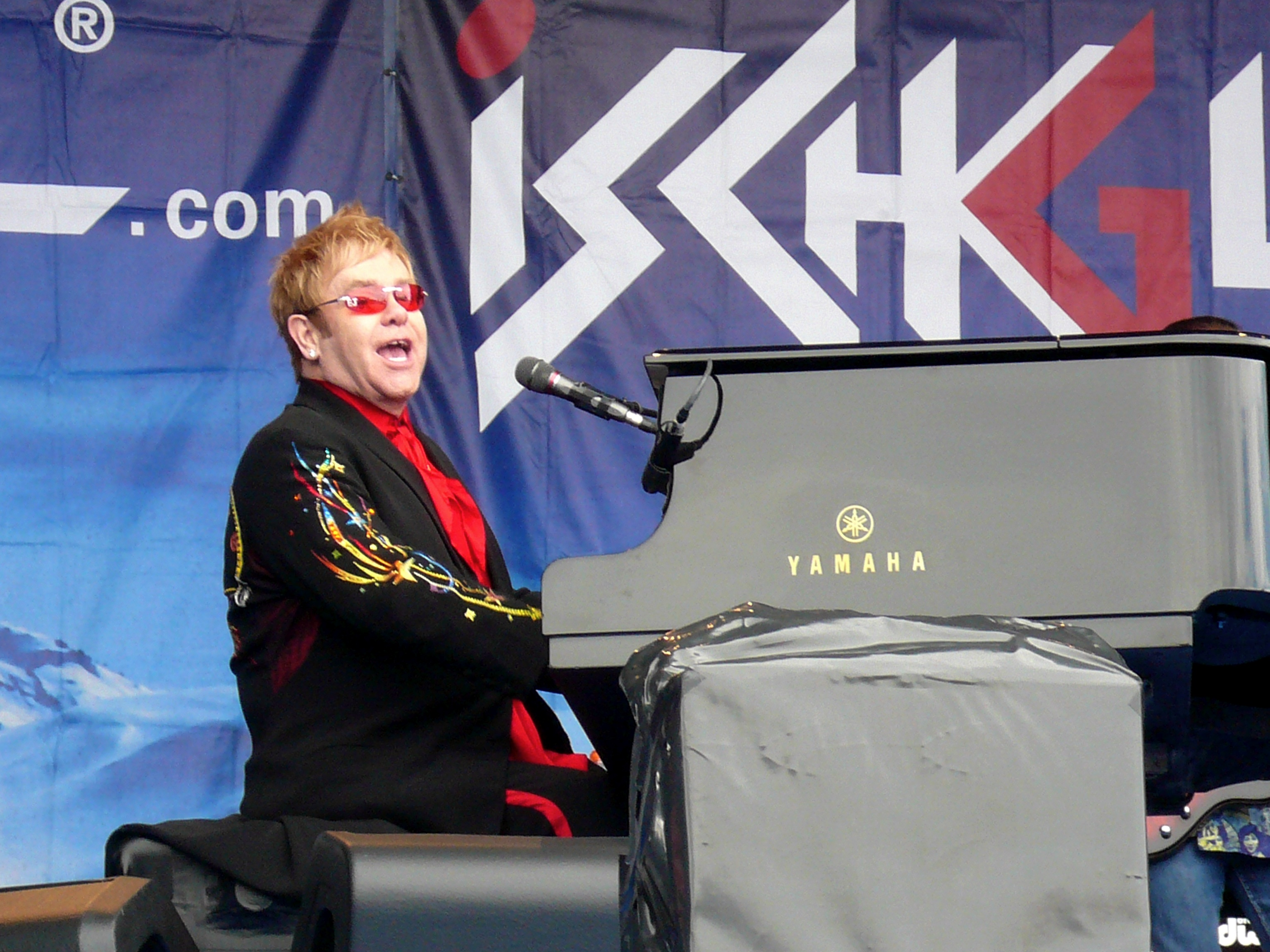
Elton John managed to reach number one on Tio i Topp in both January and December.

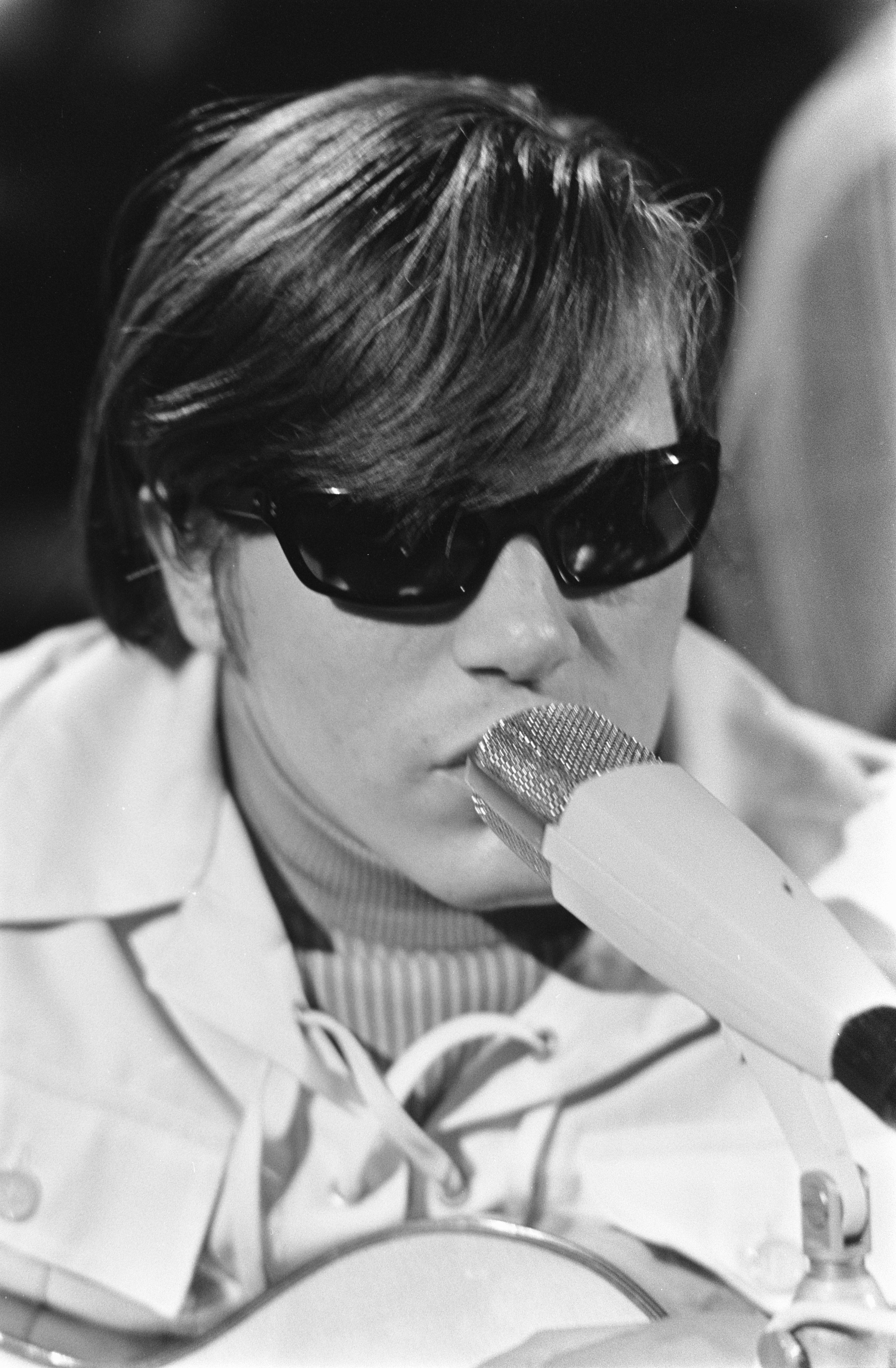
José Feliciano had his second number one with "Feliz Navidad" in February 1973 after previous hit "Shake A Hand" in 1971.

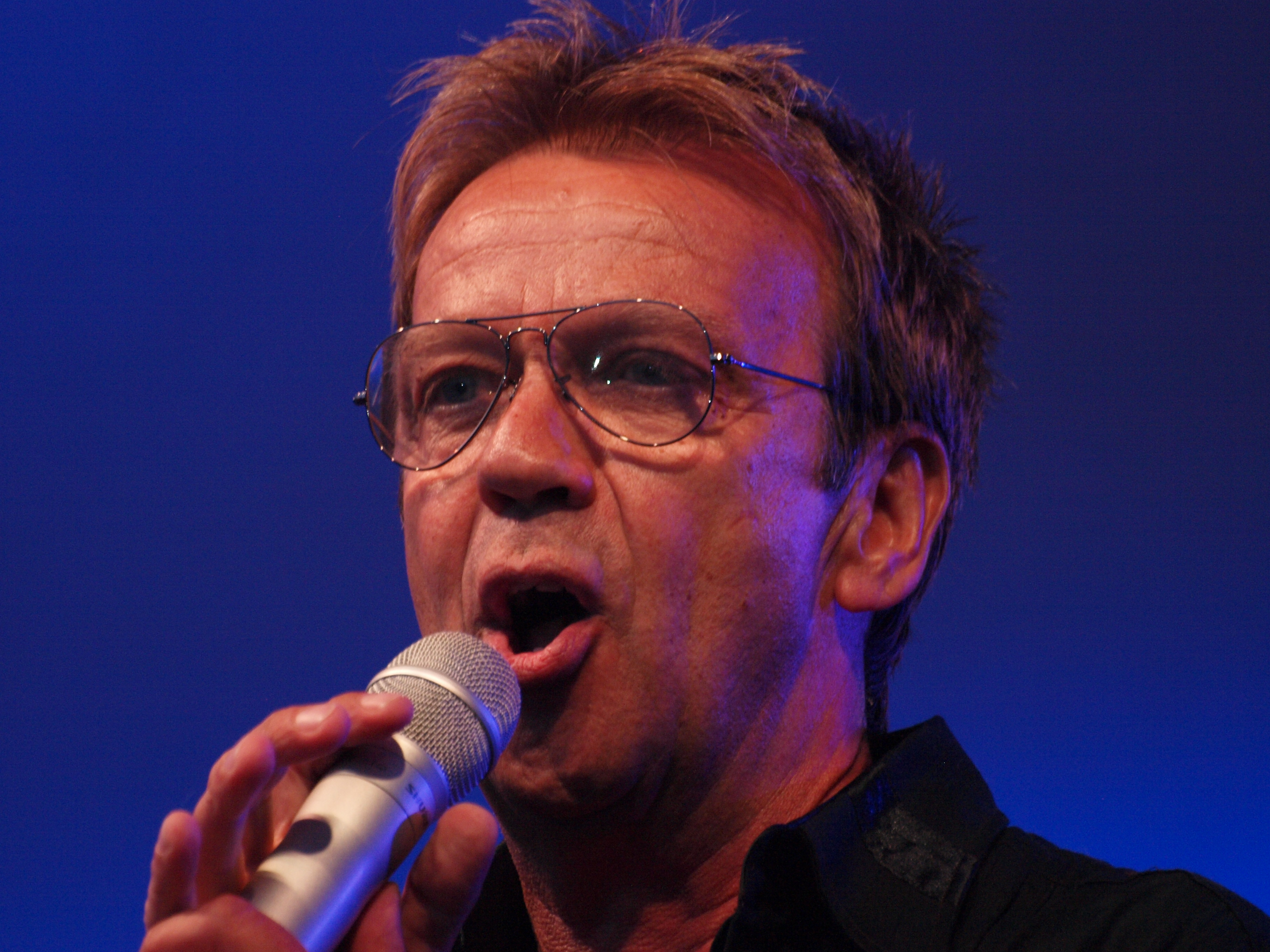
Björn Skifs managed two number ones with his band Blåblus in 1973.

1973
No.	Date	Song	Artist(s)	Reference
200	6 January	"Loop Di Love"	Shag	
201	13 January	"Crocodile Rock"	Elton John	
202	20 January	"Feliz Navidad"	José Feliciano	
202	27 January	"Feliz Navidad"	José Feliciano	
203	3 February	"Mexico"	Les Humphries Singers	
202 (re)	10 February	"Feliz Navidad"	José Feliciano	
202 (re)	17 February	"Feliz Navidad"	José Feliciano	
204	24 February	"Cotton Jenny"	Jerry Williams	
204	3 March	"Cotton Jenny"	Jerry Williams	
205	10 March	"It Never Rains in Southern California"	Albert Hammond	
206	17 March	"Ring Ring" †	Björn, Benny, Agnetha & Anni-Frid	
206	24 March	"Ring Ring" †	Björn, Benny, Agnetha & Anni-Frid	
206	31 March	"Ring Ring" †	Björn, Benny, Agnetha & Anni-Frid	
206	7 April	"Ring Ring" †	Björn, Benny, Agnetha & Anni-Frid	
207	14 April	"Power to All Our Friends" †	Cliff Richard	
207	21 April	"Power to All Our Friends" †	Cliff Richard	
207	28 April	"Power to All Our Friends" †	Cliff Richard	
207	5 May	"Power to All Our Friends" †	Cliff Richard	
207	12 May	"Power to All Our Friends" †	Cliff Richard	
208	19 May	"Hooked on a Feeling"	Björn Skifs and Blåblus	
208	26 May	"Hooked on a Feeling"	Björn Skifs and Blåblus	
209	2 June	"Hooked on a Feeling"	Björn Skifs and Blåblus	
210	9 June	"Good Grief Christina"	Chicory Tip	
208 (re)	16 June	"Hooked on a Feeling"	Björn Skifs and Blåblus	
211	23 June	"Clap Your Hands And Stamp Your Feet"	Bonnie St. Claire	
210 (re)	30 June	"Good Grief Christina"	Chicory Tip	
212	7 July	"Over and Over"	The James Boys	
213	14 July	"Sandy"	Svenne and Lotta	
213	21 July	"Sandy"	Svenne and Lotta	
213	28 July	"Sandy"	Svenne and Lotta	
213	4 August	"Sandy"	Svenne and Lotta	
213	11 August	"Sandy"	Svenne and Lotta	
214	18 August	"The Free Electric Band"	Albert Hammond	
215	25 August	"Silly Milly"	Björn Skifs and Blåblus	
215	1 September	"Silly Milly"	Björn Skifs and Blåblus	
215	8 September	"Silly Milly"	Björn Skifs and Blåblus	
216	15 September	"Killing Me Softly with His Song"	Roberta Flack	
216	22 September	"Killing Me Softly with His Song"	Roberta Flack	
216	29 September	"Killing Me Softly with His Song"	Roberta Flack	
217	6 October	"Hideaway"	Lena-Maria	
217	13 October	"Hideaway"	Lena-Maria	
217	20 October	"Hideaway"	Lena-Maria	
218	27 October	"Goin' Home"	The Osmonds	
218	3 November	"Goin' Home"	The Osmonds	
219	10 November	"What About Me"	Anne Murray	
220	17 November	"The Ballroom Blitz"	The Sweet	
221	24 November	"Knockin' on Heaven's Door"	Bob Dylan	
221	1 December	"Knockin' on Heaven's Door"	Bob Dylan	
222	8 December	"Goodbye Yellow Brick Road"	Elton John	
222	15 December	"Goodbye Yellow Brick Road"	Elton John	
221 (re)	22 December	"Knockin' on Heaven's Door"	Bob Dylan	
223	29 December	"Loves Me Like a Rock"	Paul Simon	

=== 1974 ===
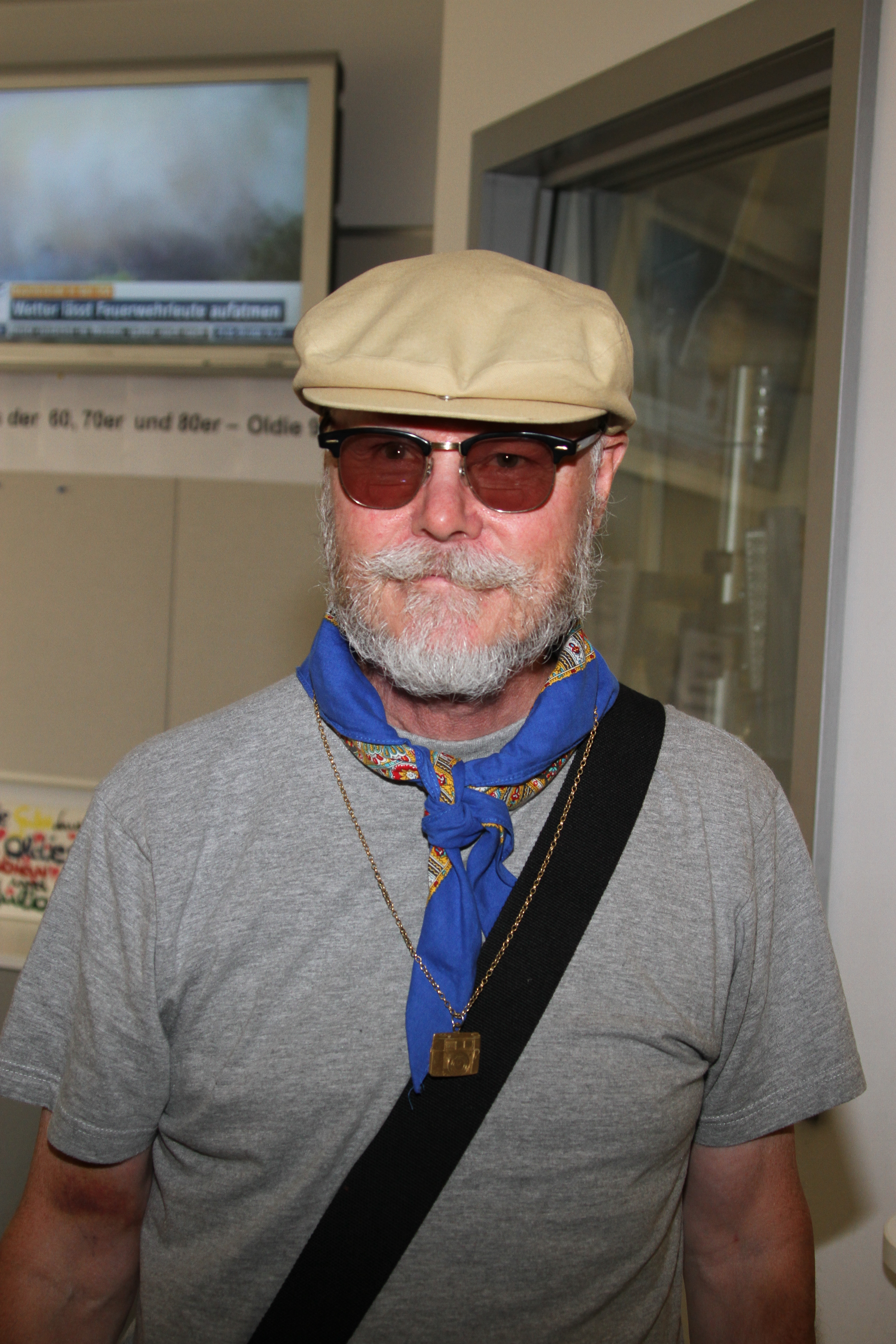
Harpo had a number-one song with "Sayonara" for five weeks.

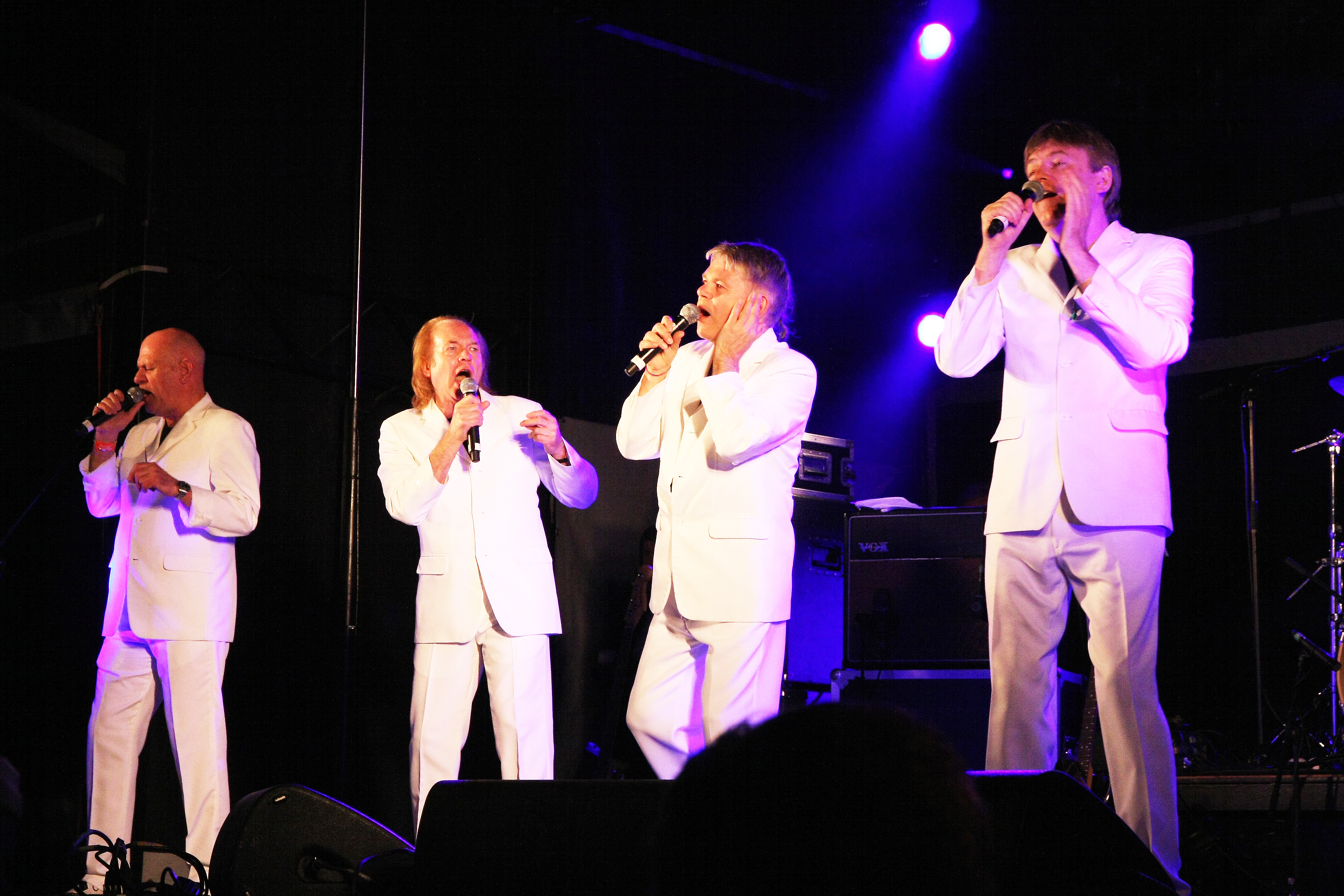
The Rubettes had the final number-one single on Tio i Topp with "Sugar Baby Love".

1974
No.	Date	Song	Artist(s)	Reference
222 (re)	5 January	"Goodbye Yellow Brick Road"	Elton John	
224	12 January	"My Whole World Is Falling Down"	Birgitta Wollgård	
225	19 January	"Sayonara"	Harpo	
225	26 January	"Sayonara"	Harpo	
225	2 February	"Sayonara"	Harpo	
225	9 February	"Sayonara"	Harpo	
225	16 February	"Sayonara"	Harpo	
226	23 February	"Kansas City"	Les Humphries Singers	
227	2 March	"Union Silver"	Middle of the Road	
228	9 March	"Working in the Coal Mine"	Björn Skifs and Blåblus	
229	16 March	"Waterloo"	ABBA	
229	23 March	"Waterloo"	ABBA	
229	30 March	"Waterloo"	ABBA	
230	6 April	"Dark Lady"	Cher	
229 (re)	13 April	"Waterloo"	ABBA	
231	20 April	"Seasons in the Sun"	Terry Jacks	
232	27 April	"I See a Star"	Mouth and MacNeal	
232	4 May	"I See a Star"	Mouth and MacNeal	
231 (re)	11 May	"Seasons in the Sun"	Terry Jacks	
233	18 May	"Hasta Mañana"	ABBA	
231 (re)	25 May	"Seasons in the Sun"	Terry Jacks	
231 (re)	1 June	"Seasons in the Sun"	Terry Jacks	
231 (re)	8 June	"Seasons in the Sun"	Terry Jacks	
234	15 June	"Everyday"	Slade	
235	22 June	"Sugar Baby Love"	The Rubettes	
235	29 June	"Sugar Baby Love"	The Rubettes	

=== 1981 ===
1961
No.	Date	Jury city	Song	Artist(s)	Reference
236	5 May	Stockholm	"In the Air Tonight"	Phil Collins	

== See also ==
- List of number-one singles and albums in Sweden, a contemporary list of number-one singles in Sweden.

== Sources ==
- Hallberg, Eric; Henningsson, Ulf (2012). Tio i Topp - med de utslagna "på försök" 1961–74 (in Swedish) (2nd ed.). Stockholm: Premium. ISBN 978-91-89136-89-2.
