= Margie Rayburn =

American singer

Marjorie Helen Orwig (June 3, 1924 – June 14, 2000), better known as Margie Rayburn, was an American traditional pop singer.

Rayburn was born in Madera, California, United States, and sang as a member of The Sunnysiders, who had a Top 40 hit in the United States in 1955 with the song "Hey! Mr. Banjo". Rayburn married Norman Malkin, also a member of the Sunnysiders. She also had a Top Ten hit of her own in 1957 with the song "I'm Available", which was written by Dave Burgess. The single, released on Liberty Records, reached No. 9 on the Billboard Hot 100 in November 1957. As a songwriter she co-wrote with Malkin the 1963 song "Roman Holiday".

Unable to find another hit, Rayburn retired from the music industry in the mid-1960s. She died on June 14, 2000, in Oceanside, California, at the age of 76.

== Discography ==
=== Albums ===
Year	Album	Record label
1959	Margie with the Russ Garcia orchestra	Liberty Records

=== Singles ===
Year	Title	Peak chart positions	Record Label	B-side
Year	Title	US Pop	Record Label	B-side
1955	"I Laughed and Laughed"	—	Capitol Records	"Alley Oop"
1956	"Can I Tell Them That You're Mine?"	—	Capitol Records	"Basin Street Blues"
1956	"Every Minute of the Day"	—	Liberty Records	"Take a Gamble on Love"
1957	"Freight Train"	—	Liberty Records	"Dreamy Eyes"
1957	"The Get Acquainted Waltz"	—	Liberty Records	"Mississippi Moon"
1957	"I'm Available"	9	Liberty Records	"If You Were"
1958	"Smoochin"	—	Liberty Records	"Oooh What a Doll"
1958	"Alright, But It Won't Be Easy"	—	Liberty Records	"I Would"
1958	"To Each His Own"	—	Liberty Records	"And He Told Me a Lie"
1959	"Make Me Queen Again"	—	Liberty Records	"Wait"
1959	"Unexpectedly"	—	Liberty Records	"Laddie-O"
1960	"Magic Words"	—	Liberty Records	"Sentimental Journey"
1960	"I Miss You Already"	—	Liberty Records	"Maid of Honor"
1960	"Try Me"	—	Challenge Records	"I've Tried So Hard Not to Love You"
1961	"Cast a Little Spell on Me"	—	Challenge Records	"Here I Am"
1962	"Hello, Mr. Heartbreak"	—	Dot Records	"Mud Pies"
1962	"Bobby Is My Hobby"	—	Dot Records	"Somebody Else Is Taking My Place"
1965	"Maker of Raindrops and Roses"	—	Capitol Records	"Are You Sure?"
1966	"Play #10 on the Juke Box"	—	Dot Records	"Happy José"
