= I'm Available =

Single by Margie Rayburn
- B-side: "If You Were"
- Released: August 1957
- Genre: Pop
- Length: 1:50
- Label: Liberty
- Songwriter(s): Dave Burgess

Margie Rayburn singles chronology
"The Get Acquainted Waltz" (1957)	"I'm Available" (1957)	"Smoochin" (1958)

"I'm Available" is a song written and recorded by Dave Burgess. It became a hit when recorded by Margie Rayburn, and reached #9 on the US pop chart in 1957.

== Other versions ==
- Bonnie Lou released a version of the song as a single in 1957.
- Line Renaud released a version of the song as a single in Germany in 1958.
- Cathy Carroll released a version of the song as a single in 1963.
