= The Hitmakers =

Danish rock band

The Hitmakers (The Floor)
- Origin: Denmark
- Genres: Rock
- Years active: 1960-1967 as The Hitmakers; 1967-1968 as The Floor
- Members: Daniel "Dan" Tadros; Eric Tadros
- Past members: Jørgen Wulff Krabbenhøft (1960-1968); Benny Qvotrup (1960-1963); Steen Bergstrøm (1960-1968); Erik Grønfeldt Hansen (1960-1963); Torben Orls Weinholt Sardorf (1963-1968); Bjarne Hørup Hørman de la Motte (1963-1968); Mogens "Django" Petersen (1967-1968)

The Hitmakers was a Danish rock group established in 1960 in Copenhagen with the initiative of Jørgen Wulff Krabbenhøft (vocalist and guitar) and Benny Qvotrup (drummer). By 1961, the band also included Steen Bergstrøm (guitar), Erik Grønfeldt Hansen (bass). The band was considered a pioneer in Danish rock based on the model of Cliff Richard and The Shadows and also the Liverpool sound exemplified by The Beatles.

The first official release by the band was a cover of The Beatles' "I Saw Her Standing There". Beyond Denmark, the band toured Finland gaining popularity there. They also recorded a cover of Little Richard's "Long Tall Sally".

In 1963, Benny Qvotrup quit being replaced by drummer Torben Orls Weinholt Sardorf and Erik Grønfeldt Hansen was replaced by bassist Bjarne Hørup Hørman de la Motte who used to play with The Cliffters.

The Hitmakers' biggest Danish hit was "Stop the Music" in December 1965 with a performance on the entertainment program Klar i Studiet. Two decades later this single was still considered one of Danish popular music's "high spots from this time of transition."

In 1967, the band shifted into music effected by flower power folk pop movement and changed its name to The Floor adding Mogens "Django" Petersen on guitar from the band The Cliffters. This new format was not as successful and the band folded in 1968.

== Discography ==
=== Albums ===
- 1967: The Hitmakers
- 1974: Pop før (The Hitmakers Recordings 1965-1967)

=== Singles ===
- 1964: "Singing the Blues" / "Tricky Dicky"
- 1965: "Stop the Music" / "What You Gonna Do About It"
- 1966: "Træd an ved makronerne" / "Eksercerer"
- 1966: "Last Train to Clarksville" / "Mohair Sam"
- 1966: "Michelle" / "Who'll Be the Next in Line"
- 1967: "Where Were You When I Needed You" / "Feelin' Groovy"
