= Happy José (Ching Ching) =

"Happy José (Ching Ching)" is a Mexican-influenced instrumental song released by a number of artists. It was first released in 1960 by Dave Appell and the Applejacks.

== Background ==
The song has the same melody as "Happy Homer", an instrumental recorded by Bill Haley & His Comets for Warner Bros. Records in 1960 (however, that particular recording would not receive commercial release until Bear Family Records included it in the 1999 box set The Warner Bros. Years and More). It's not clear if this was the first version or the one from Dave Appell.

== Song structure ==
Jack Ross' version uses the "Ching ching ching, oop-bop a-loop-a loop" lyrics in refrain, with backing orchestra and random outbursts of laughter between the singing. The Ross single came in a red sleeve with a comic figure on the front and is now considered rare and collectible. By comparison, the Haley version does not use the "ching ching ching" lyrics but rather another set of nonsense words.

Laughing was by Bill Imondi, a professional jazz drummer.

== Other versions ==
- In 1962 Jack Ross and his orchestra released a version of the song that was a surprise hit in the Netherlands and Sweden, reaching number one in both countries, as well as peaking at #57 on the US Hot 100, and #15 on the Easy Listening chart.
- Also in 1962 Willy Schobben and His Orchestra recorded their version.
- Margie Rayburn released a version of the song as the B-side to her 1966 single "Play #10 on the Juke Box".
