= Jack Ross (musician) =

American singer (1916–1982)

Jack Ross (November 1, 1916 – December 16, 1982) was a popular rock and roll and novelty song musician and singer.

== Discography ==
- "Cinderella" 1962 (No. 16 on the Billboard Hot 100)
- "Margarita", B-side "Milwaukee Stomp" 1962
- "Happy Jose [Ching Ching]", B-side "Sweet Georgia Brown"
