= Marathon (disambiguation) =

A marathon is a foot race for humans for a distance of 42.195 kilometres (26.219 mi).

Marathon may also refer to:

== Places ==
=== Australia ===
- Marathon, Queensland

=== Bahamas ===
- Marathon (Bahamas Parliament constituency)

=== Canada ===
- Marathon, Ontario

=== Greece ===
- Marathon, Greece, after which the distance race was named
  - Battle of Marathon
  - Lake Marathon, 8 km west of the town
  - Marathon Dam, forming the lake

=== United States ===
- Marathon, Florida
- Marathon, Iowa
- Marathon Township, Michigan
- Marathon, New York
- Marathon (village), New York
- Marathon, Ohio
- Marathon, Texas
- Marathon, Wisconsin, town
- Marathon County, Wisconsin
- Marathon City, Wisconsin

== Sports ==
- Mini marathon
- Half marathon
- Ultramarathon
- Marathon dancing
- Marathon swimming
- Ski marathon
- Ice skating marathon
- Club Deportivo Marathón, a Honduran soccer club
- The Marathon (horse race), in the US

== Businesses ==
- Marathon Airlines, a Greek airline
- Marathon Enterprises, Inc., maker of Sabrett hot dogs
- Marathon Motor Works, producers of the Marathon automobile
  - Marathon (automobile), vehicles manufactured by Marathon 1911–1914
- Marathon Oil, a US-based oil and natural gas exploration and production company
- Marathon Petroleum, a US-based oil refining, marketing, and pipeline transport company
- Marathon Sports, an Ecuadorian-based athletic company that distributes athletic equipment to sports teams
- Marathon Watch, a Canadian watch manufacturer
- Automobiles Marathon, a French manufacturer of Panhard powered light sports cars in the 1950s
- Marathon Automated Test Systems, a system for automated testing of printed circuit boards from Computer Automation

== Candy ==
- Marathon candy bar, a Mars' rival to Curly Wurly in the US from 1973 to 1982
- Snickers candy bar, marketed under the name "Marathon" in the UK and Ireland until 1990

== Entertainment ==
=== Film and television ===
- Marathon Production, a TV production company
- The Marathon (film), 1919, starring Harold Lloyd
- Maratón (film), a 1968 Czechoslovak war film directed by Ivo Novák
- Marathon (1980 film), a film starring Dick Gautier
- Marathon (1988 film), a sport-drama film directed by Terence Young
- Marathon (1992 film), a Spanish film about the Barcelona Olympics directed by Carlos Saura
- Marathon (2005 film), a South Korean film about an autistic marathon runner
- Marathon (media), the sequential broadcast of a number of related media programs
- Marathon Media, a French production company and animation studio in Paris
- Movie marathon, viewing of multiple consecutive movies
- "Marathon" (Law & Order), an episode of Law & Order
- "Marathon" (The Flash), an episode of The Flash

=== Video games ===
- Marathon (series), a video game series for Macintosh by Bungie
  - Marathon (1994 video game), the first in the series (1994)
  - Marathon 2: Durandal, the second in the series (1995)
  - Marathon Infinity, the third in the series (1996)
  - Marathon (2026 video game), a soft reboot of the original series and the fourth game overall

=== Music ===
==== Albums ====
- The Marathon (mixtape), by American rapper Nispey Hussle
- Marathon (Saga album)
- Marathon (Santana album), by Carlos Santana
- Maraton (album), by Swedish singer Alina Devecerski

==== Songs ====
- "Marathon" (Rush song), from the album Power Windows
- "Marathon", by August Burns Red from the album Found in Far Away Places (deluxe edition)
- "Marathon", by Dilated Peoples from the album Neighborhood Watch
- "Marathon", by Helene Fischer on the 2013 album Farbenspiel
- "Marathon", by Kayo Dot from the album Choirs of the Eye
- "Marathon", by Tennis from the album Cape Dory

==== Other uses in music ====
- Dance Marathon, a type of multi-day charity event, popular in the US in the 1920s and 1930s
- Maratone Studios, a music production company based in Sweden
- Sgt. Peppercorn's Marathon, an annual live concert of all of the music of The Beatles
- The Vibrations, an R&B group whose alter ego was "The Marathons"

== Vehicles ==
- Checker Marathon, an automobile model from Checker Motors Company
- Aircraft:
  - Handley Page Marathon, British four-engined light transport
  - Heldeberg Marathon, American design for powered parachute
  - Mirage Marathon, American home-built aircraft design
- Ships:
  - SS Marathon, an early 20th century steamship

== Other uses ==
- A typeface created by Rudolf Koch
- A container orchestration system that is part of Apache Mesos

== See also ==
- Maraton (disambiguation)
- Marathon Man (disambiguation)
