= List of number-one singles of the 2010s (Sweden) =

This is a list of number-one singles during the 2010s according to the Sverigetopplistan, a chart that ranks the best-performing singles of Sweden.

== 2010 ==
Issue date	Title	Artist(s)
1 January	"Higher"	Erik Grönwall
8 January	"Higher"	Erik Grönwall
15 January	"Higher"	Erik Grönwall
22 January	"Bad Romance"	Lady Gaga
29 January	Higher	Erik Grönwall
5 February	"Bad Romance"	Lady Gaga
12 February	"Fireflies"	Owl City
19 February	"Ambitions"	Donkeyboy
26 February	"Famous"	Play
5 March	"This Is My Life"	Anna Bergendahl
12 March	"This Is My Life"	Anna Bergendahl
19 March	"This Is My Life"	Anna Bergendahl
26 March	"This Is My Life"	Anna Bergendahl
2 April	"Unstoppable (The Return of Natalie)"	Ola Svensson
9 April	"Manboy"	Eric Saade
16 April	"Stereo Love"	Edward Maya & Vika Jigulina
23 April	"Stereo Love"	Edward Maya & Vika Jigulina
30 April	"Manboy"	Eric Saade
7 May	"Hurricane"	Rebound!
14 May	"Stereo Love"	Edward Maya & Vika Jigulina
21 May	"Stereo Love"	Edward Maya & Vika Jigulina
28 May	"Manboy"	Eric Saade
4 June	"Satellite"	Lena
11 June	"Satellite"	Lena
18 June	"Satellite"	Lena
25 June	"Gamla Ullevi"	Kent
2 July	"When You Tell the World You're Mine"	Agnes & Björn Skifs
9 July	"We No Speak Americano"	Yolanda Be Cool & DCUP
16 July	"We No Speak Americano"	Yolanda Be Cool & DCUP
23 July	"Overdrive"	Ola Svensson
30 July	"Dancing on My Own"	Robyn
6 August	"Dancing on My Own"	Robyn
13 August	"Waka Waka (This Time for Africa)"	Shakira featuring Freshlyground
20 August	"Love the Way You Lie"	Eminem featuring Rihanna
27 August	"Love the Way You Lie"	Eminem featuring Rihanna
3 September	"Love the Way You Lie"	Eminem featuring Rihanna
10 September	"Love the Way You Lie"	Eminem featuring Rihanna
17 September	"Waka Waka (This Time for Africa)"	Shakira featuring Freshlyground
24 September	"Love the Way You Lie"	Eminem featuring Rihanna
1 October	"Black Fender"	Hans Edler
8 October	"Black Fender"	Hans Edler
15 October	"Waka Waka (This Time for Africa)"	Shakira featuring Freshlyground
22 October	"Från och med du"	Oskar Linnros
29 October	"Gubben i lådan"	Daniel Adams-Ray
5 November	"Gubben i lådan"	Daniel Adams-Ray
12 November	"Gubben i lådan"	Daniel Adams-Ray
19 November	"Gubben i lådan"	Daniel Adams-Ray
26 November	"Mikrofonkåt"	September
3 December	"Mikrofonkåt"	September
10 December	"Mikrofonkåt"	September
17 December	"Mikrofonkåt"	September
24 December	"Mikrofonkåt"	September
31 December	"Mikrofonkåt"	September

== 2011 ==
Issue date	Title	Artist(s)
7 January	"Mikrofonkåt"	September
14 January	"Mikrofonkåt"	September
21 January	"Mikrofonkåt"	September
28 January	"Mikrofonkåt"	September
4 February	"Mikrofonkåt"	September
11 February	"Grenade"	Bruno Mars
18 February	"Grenade"	Bruno Mars
25 February	"Born This Way"	Lady Gaga
4 March	"Grenade"	Bruno Mars
11 March	"Popular"	Eric Saade
18 March	"Popular"	Eric Saade
25 March	"Popular"	Eric Saade
1 April	"Popular"	Eric Saade
8 April	"On the Floor"	Jennifer Lopez
15 April	"Popular"	Eric Saade
22 April	"On the Floor"	Jennifer Lopez
29 April	"On the Floor"	Jennifer Lopez
6 May	"Jag kommer"	Veronica Maggio
13 May	"Jag kommer"	Veronica Maggio
20 May	"Om sanningen ska fram"	Eric Amarillo
27 May	"Om sanningen ska fram"	Eric Amarillo
3 April	"Om sanningen ska fram"	Eric Amarillo
10 April	"Om sanningen ska fram"	Eric Amarillo
17 April	"Om sanningen ska fram"	Eric Amarillo
24 April	"Om sanningen ska fram"	Eric Amarillo
1 July	"What Are Words"	Chris Medina
8 July	"What Are Words"	Chris Medina
15 July	"What Are Words"	Chris Medina
22 July	"What Are Words"	Chris Medina
29 July	"What Are Words"	Chris Medina
5 August	"What Are Words"	Chris Medina
12 August	"What Are Words"	Chris Medina
19 August	"What Are Words"	Chris Medina
26 August	"Danza Kuduro"	Don Omar & Lucenzo
2 September	"Vart jag mig i världen vänder"	Den svenska björnstammen
9 September	"Vart jag mig i världen vänder"	Den svenska björnstammen
16 September	"Vart jag mig i världen vänder"	Den svenska björnstammen
23 September	"Moves Like Jagger"	Maroon 5 featuring Christina Aguilera
30 September	"Vart jag mig i världen vänder"	Den svenska björnstammen
7 October	"Vart jag mig i världen vänder"	Den svenska björnstammen
14 October	"Vart jag mig i världen vänder"	Den svenska björnstammen
21 October	"We Found Love"	Rihanna featuring Calvin Harris
28 October	"We Found Love"	Rihanna featuring Calvin Harris
4 November	"We Found Love"	Rihanna featuring Calvin Harris
11 November	"We Found Love"	Rihanna featuring Calvin Harris
18 November	"We Found Love"	Rihanna featuring Calvin Harris
25 November	"Levels"	Avicii
2 December	"Levels"	Avicii
9 December	"Levels"	Avicii
16 December	"Levels"	Avicii
23 December	"All This Way"	Amanda Fondell
30 December	"Levels"	Avicii

== 2012 ==
Issue date	Title	Artist(s)
6 January	"Levels"	Avicii
13 January	"Levels"	Avicii
20 January	"Levels"	Avicii
27 January	"Levels"	Avicii
3 February	"Äckligt"	Ansiktet
10 February	"Äckligt"	Ansiktet
17 February	"Äckligt"	Ansiktet
24 February	"Ai se eu te pego!"	Michel Teló
2 March	"Ai se eu te pego!"	Michel Teló
9 March	"Euphoria"	Loreen
16 March	"Euphoria"	Loreen
23 March	"Euphoria"	Loreen
30 March	"Euphoria"	Loreen
6 April	"Euphoria"	Loreen
13 April	"Euphoria"	Loreen
20 April	"Somebody That I Used to Know"	Gotye featuring Kimbra
27 April	"Somebody That I Used to Know"	Gotye featuring Kimbra
4 May	"Somebody That I Used to Know"	Gotye featuring Kimbra
11 May	"Dansa pausa"	Panetoz
18 May	"Dansa pausa"	Panetoz
25 May	"Dansa pausa"	Panetoz
1 June	"Whistle"	Flo Rida
8 June	"Whistle"	Flo Rida
15 June	"Whistle"	Flo Rida
22 June	"Whistle"	Flo Rida
29 June	"Whistle"	Flo Rida
6 July	"Whistle"	Flo Rida
13 July	"Flytta på dej!"	Alina Devecerski
20 July	"Flytta på dej!"	Alina Devecerski
27 July	"Whistle"	Flo Rida
3 August	"Whistle"	Flo Rida
10 August	"Vart jag än går"	Stiftelsen
17 August	"Vart jag än går"	Stiftelsen
24 August	"Vart jag än går"	Stiftelsen
31 August	"Vart jag än går"	Stiftelsen
7 September	"Vart jag än går"	Stiftelsen
14 September	"Vart jag än går"	Stiftelsen
21 September	"Hungry Hearts"	Nause
28 September	"Don't You Worry Child"	Swedish House Mafia featuring John Martin
5 October	"Don't You Worry Child"	Swedish House Mafia featuring John Martin
12 October	"Don't You Worry Child"	Swedish House Mafia featuring John Martin
19 October	"Don't You Worry Child"	Swedish House Mafia featuring John Martin
26 October	"Don't You Worry Child"	Swedish House Mafia featuring John Martin
2 November	"Don't You Worry Child"	Swedish House Mafia featuring John Martin
9 November	"Don't You Worry Child"	Swedish House Mafia featuring John Martin
16 November	"Don't You Worry Child"	Swedish House Mafia featuring John Martin
23 November	"Don't You Worry Child"	Swedish House Mafia featuring John Martin
30 November	"Don't You Worry Child"	Swedish House Mafia featuring John Martin
7 December	"Don't You Worry Child"	Swedish House Mafia featuring John Martin
14 December	"Don't You Worry Child"	Swedish House Mafia featuring John Martin
21 December	"Don't You Worry Child"	Swedish House Mafia featuring John Martin
28 December	"Radioactive"	Imagine Dragons

== 2013 ==
Issue date	Title	Artist(s)
4 January	"En apa som liknar dig"	Darin
11 January	"När solen går ner"	Aki featuring Kapten Röd
18 January	"När solen går ner"	Aki featuring Kapten Röd
25 January	"När solen går ner"	Aki featuring Kapten Röd
1 February	"Let Her Go"	Passenger
8 February	"Let Her Go"	Passenger
15 February	"Let Her Go"	Passenger
22 February	"Uncover"	Zara Larsson
1 March	"Uncover"	Zara Larsson
8 March	"Let Her Go"	Passenger
15 March	"You"	Robin Stjernberg
22 March	"You"	Robin Stjernberg
29 March	"You"	Robin Stjernberg
5 April	"You"	Robin Stjernberg
12 April	"You"	Robin Stjernberg
19 April	"Just Give Me a Reason"	Pink featuring Nate Ruess
26 April	"Just Give Me a Reason"	Pink featuring Nate Ruess
3 May	"Just Give Me a Reason"	Pink featuring Nate Ruess
10 May	"Can't Hold Us"	Macklemore and Ryan Lewis featuring Ray Dalton
17 May	"Can't Hold Us"	Macklemore and Ryan Lewis featuring Ray Dalton
24 May	"Can't Hold Us"	Macklemore and Ryan Lewis featuring Ray Dalton
31 May	"Can't Hold Us"	Macklemore and Ryan Lewis featuring Ray Dalton
7 June	"Can't Hold Us"	Macklemore and Ryan Lewis featuring Ray Dalton
14 June	"Can't Hold Us"	Macklemore and Ryan Lewis featuring Ray Dalton
21 June	"Can't Hold Us"	Macklemore and Ryan Lewis featuring Ray Dalton
28 June	"Wake Me Up!"	Avicii
5 July	"Wake Me Up!"	Avicii
12 July	"Wake Me Up!"	Avicii
19 July	"Wake Me Up!"	Avicii
26 July	"Wake Me Up!"	Avicii
2 August	"Wake Me Up!"	Avicii
9 August	"Wake Me Up!"	Avicii
16 August	"Wake Me Up!"	Avicii
23 August	"Wake Me Up!"	Avicii
30 August	"Wake Me Up!"	Avicii
6 September	"Wake Me Up!"	Avicii
13 September	"Wake Me Up!"	Avicii
20 September	"You Make Me"	Avicii
27 September	"Hey Brother"	Avicii
4 October	"Hey Brother"	Avicii
11 October	"Hey Brother"	Avicii
18 October	"Hey Brother"	Avicii
25 October	"Hey Brother"	Avicii
1 November	"Hey Brother"	Avicii
8 November	"Hey Brother"	Avicii
15 November	"The Monster"	Eminem featuring Rihanna
22 November	"The Monster"	Eminem featuring Rihanna
29 November	"The Monster"	Eminem featuring Rihanna
6 December	"Timber"	Pitbull featuring Ke$ha
13 December	"Timber"	Pitbull featuring Ke$ha
20 December	"Timber"	Pitbull featuring Ke$ha
27 December	"Timber"	Pitbull featuring Ke$ha

== 2014 ==
Issue date	Title	Artist(s)
3 January	"Timber"	Pitbull featuring Ke$ha
10 January	"Timber"	Pitbull featuring Ke$ha
17 January	"I See Fire"	Ed Sheeran
24 January	"I See Fire"	Ed Sheeran
31 January	"I See Fire"	Ed Sheeran
7 February	"I See Fire"	Ed Sheeran
14 February	"I See Fire"	Ed Sheeran
21 February	"I See Fire"	Ed Sheeran
28 February	"I See Fire"	Ed Sheeran
7 March	"Busy Doin' Nothin'"	Ace Wilder
14 March	"Busy Doin' Nothin'"	Ace Wilder
21 March	"Busy Doin' Nothin'"	Ace Wilder
28 March	"Busy Doin' Nothin'"	Ace Wilder
4 April	"Rather Be"	Clean Bandit featuring Jess Glynne
11 April	"Waves (Robin Schulz Remix)"	Mr Probz
18 April	"Waves (Robin Schulz Remix)"	Mr Probz
25 April	"Waves (Robin Schulz Remix)"	Mr Probz
2 May	"All of Me"	John Legend
9 May	"All of Me"	John Legend
16 May	"All of Me"	John Legend
23 May	"All of Me"	John Legend
30 May	"All of Me"	John Legend
6 June	"All of Me"	John Legend
13 June	"All of Me"	John Legend
20 June	"All of Me"	John Legend
27 June	"All of Me"	John Legend
3 July	"Din soldat"	Albin feat. Kristin Amparo
10 July	"Din soldat"	Albin feat. Kristin Amparo
17 July	"Din soldat"	Albin feat. Kristin Amparo
24 July	"Din soldat"	Albin feat. Kristin Amparo
31 July	"Prayer in C (Robin Schulz Remix)"	Lilly Wood & The Prick and Robin Schulz
7 August	"Prayer in C (Robin Schulz Remix)"	Lilly Wood & The Prick and Robin Schulz
14 August	"Prayer in C (Robin Schulz Remix)"	Lilly Wood & The Prick and Robin Schulz
21 August	"Prayer in C (Robin Schulz Remix)"	Lilly Wood & The Prick and Robin Schulz
28 August	"Prayer in C (Robin Schulz Remix)"	Lilly Wood & The Prick and Robin Schulz
4 September	"I'm an Albatraoz"	AronChupa
11 September	"I'm an Albatraoz"	AronChupa
18 September	"I'm an Albatraoz"	AronChupa
25 September	"Blame"	Calvin Harris Feat John Newman
2 October	"Blame"	Calvin Harris Feat John Newman
9 October	"Blame"	Calvin Harris Feat John Newman
16 October	"The Days"	Avicii
23 October	"The Days"	Avicii
30 October	"The Days"	Avicii
6 November	"Cheerleader (Felix Jaehn Remix)"	OMI
13 November	"Cheerleader (Felix Jaehn Remix)"	OMI
20 November	"Cheerleader (Felix Jaehn Remix)"	OMI
27 November	"Cheerleader (Felix Jaehn Remix)"	OMI
4 December	"Cheerleader (Felix Jaehn Remix)"	OMI
11 December	"Cheerleader (Felix Jaehn Remix)"	OMI
18 December	"Cheerleader (Felix Jaehn Remix)"	OMI
25 December	"Cheerleader (Felix Jaehn Remix)"	OMI

== 2015 ==
Issue date	Title	Artist(s)
1 January	"Cheerleader (Felix Jaehn Remix)"	OMI
8 January	"Take Me to Church"	Hozier
15 January	"Take Me to Church"	Hozier
22 January	"Take Me to Church"	Hozier
29 January	"Love Me Like You Do"	Ellie Goulding
5 February	"Love Me Like You Do"	Ellie Goulding
12 February	"Love Me Like You Do"	Ellie Goulding
19 February	"Love Me Like You Do"	Ellie Goulding
26 February	"Love Me Like You Do"	Ellie Goulding
5 March	"FourFiveSeconds"	Rihanna featuring Kanye West and Paul McCartney
12 March	"FourFiveSeconds"	Rihanna featuring Kanye West and Paul McCartney
19 March	"Heroes"	Måns Zelmerlöw
26 March	"Heroes"	Måns Zelmerlöw
2 April	"Stole the Show"	Kygo featuring Parson James
9 April	"Stole the Show"	Kygo featuring Parson James
16 April	"See You Again"	Wiz Khalifa featuring Charlie Puth
23 April	"See You Again"	Wiz Khalifa featuring Charlie Puth
30 April	"See You Again"	Wiz Khalifa featuring Charlie Puth
7 May	"See You Again"	Wiz Khalifa featuring Charlie Puth
14 May	"See You Again"	Wiz Khalifa featuring Charlie Puth
21 May	"Are You With Me"	Lost Frequencies
28 May	"Det draaar"	Axel Wikner
4 June	"Waiting for Love"	Avicii
11 June	"Waiting for Love"	Avicii
18 June	"Waiting for Love"	Avicii
25 June	"Sun Is Shining"	Axwell and Ingrosso
2 July	"Sun Is Shining"	Axwell and Ingrosso
9 July	"Sun Is Shining"	Axwell and Ingrosso
16 July	"Sun Is Shining"	Axwell and Ingrosso
24 July	"Lush Life"	Zara Larsson
31 July	"Lush Life"	Zara Larsson
7 August	"Lush Life"	Zara Larsson
14 August	"Lush Life"	Zara Larsson
21 August	"Lush Life"	Zara Larsson
28 August	"Johnny G (The Guidetti Song)"	Badpojken
4 September	"What Do You Mean?	Justin Bieber
11 September	"What Do You Mean?	Justin Bieber
18 September	"What Do You Mean?	Justin Bieber
25 September	"Never Forget You"	MNEK and Zara Larsson
2 October	"What Do You Mean?"	Justin Bieber
11 October	"What Do You Mean?"	Justin Bieber
16 October	"7 Years"	Lukas Graham
23 October	"7 Years"	Lukas Graham
30 October	"Sorry"	Justin Bieber
6 November	"Hello"	Adele
13 November	"Hello"	Adele
20 November	"Love Yourself"	Justin Bieber
27 November	"Love Yourself"	Justin Bieber
4 December	"Love Yourself"	Justin Bieber
11 December	"Love Yourself"	Justin Bieber
18 December	"Love Yourself"	Justin Bieber
25 December	"Faded"	Alan Walker

== 2016 ==
Issue date	Title	Artist(s)
1 January	"Faded"	Alan Walker
8 January	"Faded"	Alan Walker
15 January	"Faded"	Alan Walker
22 January	"Faded"	Alan Walker
29 January	"Faded"	Alan Walker
5 February	"Faded"	Alan Walker
12 February	"Pillowtalk"	Zayn
19 February	"Bada nakna"	Samir & Viktor
26 February	"Faded"	Alan Walker
4 March	"If I Were Sorry"	Frans
11 March	"If I Were Sorry"	Frans
18 March	"If I Were Sorry"	Frans
25 March	"If I Were Sorry"	Frans
1 April	"If I Were Sorry"	Frans
8 April	"Cheap Thrills"	Sia featuring Sean Paul
15 April	"Cheap Thrills"	Sia featuring Sean Paul
22 April	"Cheap Thrills"	Sia featuring Sean Paul
29 April	"One Dance"	Drake featuring Wizkid & Kyla
6 May	"One Dance"	Drake featuring Wizkid & Kyla
13 May	"One Dance"	Drake featuring Wizkid & Kyla
20 May	"Can't Stop the Feeling!"	Justin Timberlake
27 May	"Can't Stop the Feeling!"	Justin Timberlake
3 June	"Can't Stop the Feeling!"	Justin Timberlake
10 June	"Can't Stop the Feeling!"	Justin Timberlake
18 June	"The Ocean"	Mike Perry featuring Shy Martin
25 June	"The Ocean"	Mike Perry featuring Shy Martin
2 July	"The Ocean"	Mike Perry featuring Shy Martin
9 July	"The Ocean"	Mike Perry featuring Shy Martin
16 July	"The Ocean"	Mike Perry featuring Shy Martin
23 July	"The Ocean"	Mike Perry featuring Shy Martin
29 July	"Cold Water"	Major Lazer featuring Justin Bieber and MØ
5 August	"Cold Water"	Major Lazer featuring Justin Bieber and MØ
12 August	"Cold Water"	Major Lazer featuring Justin Bieber and MØ
19 August	"Cold Water"	Major Lazer featuring Justin Bieber and MØ
26 August	"Cold Water"	Major Lazer featuring Justin Bieber and MØ
2 September	"Cold Water"	Major Lazer featuring Justin Bieber and MØ
9 September	"Ain't My Fault"	Zara Larsson
16 September	"Closer"	The Chainsmokers featuring Halsey
23 September	"Closer"	The Chainsmokers featuring Halsey
30 September	"Closer"	The Chainsmokers featuring Halsey
7 October	"Starboy"	The Weeknd featuring Daft Punk
14 October	"Starboy"	The Weeknd featuring Daft Punk
21 October	"Starboy"	The Weeknd featuring Daft Punk
28 October	"Say You Won't Let Go"	James Arthur
4 November	"Say You Won't Let Go"	James Arthur
11 November	"Say You Won't Let Go"	James Arthur
18 November	"Say You Won't Let Go"	James Arthur
25 November	"Call on Me"	Starley
2 December	"Call on Me"	Starley
9 December	"Call on Me"	Starley
16 December	"Call on Me"	Starley
23 December	"Rockabye"	Clean Bandit featuring Anne-Marie & Sean Paul
30 December	"I Don't Wanna Live Forever"	Zayn & Taylor Swift

== 2017 ==
Issue date	Title	Artist(s)
6 January	"Rockabye"	Clean Bandit featuring Anne-Marie & Sean Paul
13 January	"Shape of You"	Ed Sheeran
20 January	"Shape of You"	Ed Sheeran
27 January	"Shape of You"	Ed Sheeran
3 February	"Shape of You"	Ed Sheeran
10 February	"Shape of You"	Ed Sheeran
17 February	"Shape of You"	Ed Sheeran
24 February	"All I Need"	Joakim Lundell featuring Arrhult
3 March	"Shape of You"	Ed Sheeran
10 March	"Shape of You"	Ed Sheeran
17 March	"Shape of You"	Ed Sheeran
24 March	"Shape of You"	Ed Sheeran
31 March	"Symphony"	Clean Bandit featuring Zara Larsson
7 April	"Shape of You"	Ed Sheeran
14 April	"Shape of You"	Ed Sheeran
21 April	"Shape of You"	Ed Sheeran
28 April	"Despacito" (Remix)	Luis Fonsi and Daddy Yankee featuring Justin Bieber
5 May	"Despacito" (Remix)	Luis Fonsi and Daddy Yankee featuring Justin Bieber
12 May	"Despacito" (Remix)	Luis Fonsi and Daddy Yankee featuring Justin Bieber
19 May	"Despacito" (Remix)	Luis Fonsi and Daddy Yankee featuring Justin Bieber
26 May	"Despacito" (Remix)	Luis Fonsi and Daddy Yankee featuring Justin Bieber
2 June	"Despacito" (Remix)	Luis Fonsi and Daddy Yankee featuring Justin Bieber
9 June	"Despacito" (Remix)	Luis Fonsi and Daddy Yankee featuring Justin Bieber
16 June	"Despacito" (Remix)	Luis Fonsi and Daddy Yankee featuring Justin Bieber
23 June	"Despacito" (Remix)	Luis Fonsi and Daddy Yankee featuring Justin Bieber
30 June	"Despacito" (Remix)	Luis Fonsi and Daddy Yankee featuring Justin Bieber
7 July	"Despacito" (Remix)	Luis Fonsi and Daddy Yankee featuring Justin Bieber
14 July	"Despacito" (Remix)	Luis Fonsi and Daddy Yankee featuring Justin Bieber
21 July	"Despacito" (Remix)	Luis Fonsi and Daddy Yankee featuring Justin Bieber
28 July	"Despacito" (Remix)	Luis Fonsi and Daddy Yankee featuring Justin Bieber
4 August	"Despacito" (Remix)	Luis Fonsi and Daddy Yankee featuring Justin Bieber
11 August	"Despacito" (Remix)	Luis Fonsi and Daddy Yankee featuring Justin Bieber
18 August	"Without You"	Avicii featuring Sandro Cavazza
25 August	"Without You"	Avicii featuring Sandro Cavazza
1 September	"Without You"	Avicii featuring Sandro Cavazza
8 September	"Without You"	Avicii featuring Sandro Cavazza
15 September	"Without You"	Avicii featuring Sandro Cavazza
22 September	"Rockstar"	Post Malone featuring 21 Savage
29 September	"Rockstar"	Post Malone featuring 21 Savage
6 October	"Rockstar"	Post Malone featuring 21 Savage
13 October	"Rockstar"	Post Malone featuring 21 Savage
20 October	"Rockstar"	Post Malone featuring 21 Savage
27 October	"Rockstar"	Post Malone featuring 21 Savage
3 November	"Rockstar"	Post Malone featuring 21 Savage
10 November	"Pari"	Hov1 featuring Jireel
17 November	"Pari"	Hov1 featuring Jireel
24 November	"Rockstar"	Post Malone featuring 21 Savage
31 November	"Rockstar"	Post Malone featuring 21 Savage
8 December	"Perfect Duet"	Ed Sheeran and Beyoncé
15 December	"Perfect Duet"	Ed Sheeran and Beyoncé
22 December	"River"	Eminem featuring Ed Sheeran
29 December	"Last Christmas"	Wham!

== 2018 ==
Issue date	Title	Artist(s)
5 January	"Perfect Duet"	Ed Sheeran and Beyoncé
12 January	"Perfect Duet"	Ed Sheeran and Beyoncé
19 January	"Perfect Duet"	Ed Sheeran and Beyoncé
26 January	"Perfect Duet"	Ed Sheeran and Beyoncé
2 February	"God's Plan"	Drake
9 February	"God's Plan"	Drake
16 February	"God's Plan"	Drake
23 February	"God's Plan"	Drake
2 March	"Psycho"	Post Malone featuring Ty Dolla Sign
9 March	"Every Single Day"	Felix Sandman
16 March	"Every Single Day"	Felix Sandman
23 March	"Every Single Day"	Felix Sandman
30 March	"Every Single Day"	Felix Sandman
6 April	"Hon dansar vidare i livet"	Hov1
13 April	"Hon dansar vidare i livet"	Hov1
20 April	"Hon dansar vidare i livet"	Hov1
27 April	"Without You"	Avicii featuring Sandro Cavazza
4 May	"Without You"	Avicii featuring Sandro Cavazza
11 May	"Better Now"	Post Malone
18 May	"Better Now"	Post Malone
25 May	"Mer för varandra"	Norlie & KKV and Estrad
1 June	"Mer för varandra"	Norlie & KKV and Estrad
8 June	"Mer för varandra"	Norlie & KKV and Estrad
15 June	"Mer för varandra"	Norlie & KKV and Estrad
22 June	"Mer för varandra"	Norlie & KKV and Estrad
29 June	"Mer för varandra"	Norlie & KKV and Estrad
6 July	"Don't Matter to Me"	Drake featuring Michael Jackson
13 July	"Don't Matter to Me"	Drake featuring Michael Jackson
20 July	"In My Feelings"	Drake
27 July	"Still" (Recorded at Spotify Studios)	Hov1
3 August	"In My Feelings"	Drake
10 August	"In My Mind"	Dynoro and Gigi D'Agostino
17 August	"In My Mind"	Dynoro and Gigi D'Agostino
24 August	"In My Mind"	Dynoro and Gigi D'Agostino
31 August	"Auf wiedersehen"	Hov1
7 September	"In My Mind"	Dynoro and Gigi D'Agostino
14 September	"In My Mind"	Dynoro and Gigi D'Agostino
21 September	"I Love It"	Kanye West and Lil Pump
28 September	"Falling Down"	Lil Peep and XXXTentacion
5 October	"Sweet but Psycho"	Ava Max
12 October	"Sweet but Psycho"	Ava Max
19 October	"Sweet but Psycho"	Ava Max
26 October	"Sweet but Psycho"	Ava Max
2 November	"Shallow"	Lady Gaga and Bradley Cooper
9 November	"Shallow"	Lady Gaga and Bradley Cooper
16 November	"Shallow"	Lady Gaga and Bradley Cooper
23 November	"Shallow"	Lady Gaga and Bradley Cooper
30 November	"Shallow"	Lady Gaga and Bradley Cooper
7 December	"All I Want for Christmas Is You"	Mariah Carey
14 December	"All I Want for Christmas Is You"	Mariah Carey
21 December	"All I Want for Christmas Is You"	Mariah Carey
28 December	"Last Christmas"	Wham!

== 2019 ==
Issue date	Title	Artist(s)
4 January	"Shallow"	Lady Gaga and Bradley Cooper
11 January	"Shallow"	Lady Gaga and Bradley Cooper
18 January	"Shallow"	Lady Gaga and Bradley Cooper
25 January	"7 Rings"	Ariana Grande
1 February	"7 Rings"	Ariana Grande
8 February	"Bury a Friend"	Billie Eilish
15 February	"Katten i trakten"	Einár
22 February	"Katten i trakten"	Einár
1 March	"Katten i trakten"	Einár
8 March	"Too Late for Love"	John Lundvik
15 March	"Too Late for Love"	John Lundvik
22 March	"Too Late for Love"	John Lundvik
29 March	"Too Late for Love"	John Lundvik
5 April	"Vindar på Mars"	Hov1
12 April	"SOS"	Avicii featuring Aloe Blacc
19 April	"SOS"	Avicii featuring Aloe Blacc
26 April	"SOS"	Avicii featuring Aloe Blacc
3 May	"SOS"	Avicii featuring Aloe Blacc
10 May	"SOS"	Avicii featuring Aloe Blacc
17 May	"I Don't Care"	Ed Sheeran and Justin Bieber
24 May	"Hornstullsstrand"	Hov1 and Veronica Maggio
31 May	"I Don't Care"	Ed Sheeran and Justin Bieber
7 June	"I Don't Care"	Ed Sheeran and Justin Bieber
14 June	"Första klass"	Einár
21 June	"Första klass"	Einár
28 June	"I Don't Care"	Ed Sheeran and Justin Bieber
5 July	"Señorita"	Shawn Mendes and Camila Cabello
12 July	"Señorita"	Shawn Mendes and Camila Cabello
19 July	"Señorita"	Shawn Mendes and Camila Cabello
26 July	"Señorita"	Shawn Mendes and Camila Cabello
2 August	"Señorita"	Shawn Mendes and Camila Cabello
9 August	"Dance Monkey"	Tones and I
16 August	"Dance Monkey"	Tones and I
23 August	"Dance Monkey"	Tones and I
30 August	"Nu vi skiner"	Einár
6 September	"Dance Monkey"	Tones and I
13 September	"Pippi"	Dree Low
20 September	"Pippi"	Dree Low
27 September	"Pippi"	Dree Low
4 October	"Pippi"	Dree Low
11 October	"Pippi"	Dree Low
18 October	"Dance Monkey"	Tones and I
25 October	"Dance Monkey"	Tones and I
1 November	"Dance Monkey"	Tones and I
8 November	"Dance Monkey"	Tones and I
15 November	"Lev nu dö sen"	Miss Li
22 November	"Lev nu dö sen"	Miss Li
29 November	"Lev nu dö sen"	Miss Li
6 December	"Lev nu dö sen"	Miss Li
13 December	"Dance Monkey"	Tones and I
20 December	"XO"	Yasin and Dree Low
27 December	"Last Christmas"	Wham!

== See also ==
- 2010 in Swedish music
- 2011 in Swedish music
- 2012 in Swedish music
- 2013 in Swedish music
- 2014 in Swedish music
- 2015 in Swedish music
- 2016 in Swedish music
- 2017 in Swedish music
- 2018 in Swedish music
- 2019 in Swedish music
