= Maraton =

Maraton, in some languages Maratone and Maratón is a variant of Marathon

Maraton may refer to:

- Maratón (film), 1968 Czechoslovak film directed by Ivo Novák
- Maratone Studios, music production company based in Sweden
- Maraton (album), album by Swedish singer Alina Devecerski
- Maratón Alpino Madrileño, trail running race that takes place on Sierra de Guadarrama, in Madrid, Spain

== See also ==
- Marathon (disambiguation)
- Tendai Maraton Monks, Japanese monks of Mt. Hiel known for Kaihōgyō, set of the ascetic physical endurance trainings
