= Flytta på dej! =

Single by Alina Devecerski

from the album Maraton
- Released: 20 April 2012
- Genre: Electropop
- Length: 3:02
- Label: EMI
- Songwriters: Alina Devecerski, Christoffer Wikberg
- Producer: Christoffer Wikberg

Alina Devecerski singles chronology
"Jag svär" (2012)	"Flytta på dej!" (2012)	"Ikväll Skiter Jag I Allt" (2012)

"Flytta på dej!" (which translates as "Move over") is a single by Swedish pop singer Alina Devecerski. The song was co-written by Devecerski and Christoffer Wikberg. It was released as a digital download on 20 April 2012 and peaked at number one in Sweden, Norway and Denmark.

== Track listing ==
Digital download
No.	Title	Length
1.	"Flytta på dej"	3:25
2.	"Jag svär"	2:52

Remix-EP
No.	Title	Length
1.	"Flytta på dej" (GoodWill & MGI Remix)	5:04
2.	"Flytta på dej" (Peet Syntax & Alexie Divello Club Mix)	6:35
3.	"Flytta på dej" (Peet Syntax & Alexie Divello Radio Edit)	3:35
4.	"Flytta på dej" (The Seized Remix)	5:17
5.	"Flytta på dej" (Extended)	4:44

== Charts ==
=== Weekly charts ===
Chart (2012)	Peak position
Denmark (Tracklisten)	1
Norway (VG-lista)	1
Sweden (Sverigetopplistan)	1

=== Year-end charts ===
Chart (2012)	Position
Sweden (Sverigetopplistan)	13

== Certifications ==
Region	Certification	Certified units/sales
Sweden (GLF)	3× Platinum	120,000^{‡}
Streaming
Denmark (IFPI Danmark)	2× Platinum	3,600,000^{†}
^{‡} Sales+streaming figures based on certification alone.^{†} Streaming-only figures based on certification alone.

== Release history ==
Region	Date	Format	Label
Sweden	20 April 2012	Digital download	EMI
