= Herff–Brooks Corporation =

Defunct American motor vehicle manufacturer

Herff-Brooks Corporation
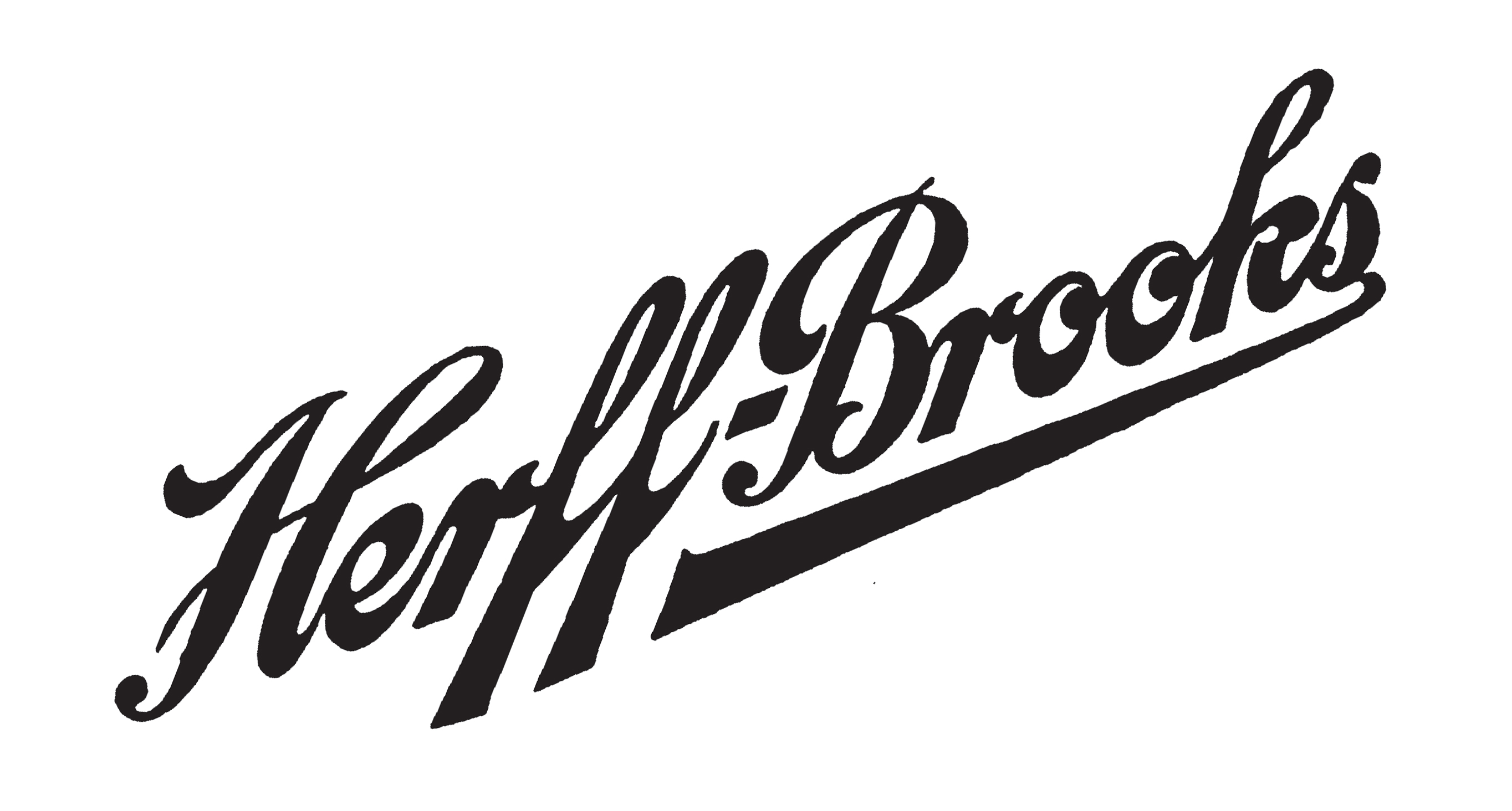
- Herff-Brooks logo from advertisement
- Industry: Automotive
- Founded: 1913; 113 years ago
- Defunct: 1917; 109 years ago
- Fate: factory turned over to War work
- Headquarters: Indianapolis, Indiana
- Key people: Herff Brothers, H. H. Brooks
- Products: Automobiles

Marathon advertisement (1913)

₵

Herff–Brooks Corporation was a brass era automobile manufacturer based in Indianapolis, Indiana, in 1914 to 1916.

== History ==
Herff-Brooks formed in 1913 to take on the sales of the Marathon Motor Works of Nashville, Tennessee. By 1915 Herff-Brooks purchased the now defunct Marathon machinery, and along with some personnel set up a new factory at the Wayne Works in Richmond, Indiana.

Herff-Brooks were identical to the 1914 Marathons with minor improvements. A 40 hp four-cylinder car, at $1,100, and a 50 hp six-cylinder car, at $1,375 were offered. For 1915 a 25 hp car, selling at $765, was added.

H. H. Brooks, former Sales Manager for Marathon was General Manager. He joined Marmon as a Sales Manager in 1917 when Herff-Brooks automobile production stopped. The Wayne Works were turned over for War production.

== See also ==
- Marathon Motor Works
- Marathon Automobile
