= List of music recording certifications =

Music recording certifications are typically awarded by the worldwide music industry based on the total units sold, streamed, or shipped to retailers. These awards and their requirements are defined by the various certifying bodies representing the music industry in various countries and territories worldwide. The standard certification awards given consist of Gold, Platinum, and sometimes Diamond awards, in ascending order; the UK and Australia also have a Silver certification, ranking below Gold. In most cases, a "Multi-Platinum" or "Multi-Diamond" award is given for multiples of the Platinum or Diamond requirements.

Many music industries around the world are represented by the International Federation of the Phonographic Industry (IFPI). The IFPI operates in 66 countries and services affiliated industry associations in 45 countries. In some cases, the IFPI is merely affiliated with the already operational certification bodies of a country, but in many countries with lesser-developed industries, the IFPI acts as the sole certifying body servicing the country or region's music industry. Still other countries not represented by the IFPI have certifying bodies operating independently, such as individual record companies which service the country or region's music industry as a whole.

Though all certifying bodies give awards for album sales or shipments, many also certify singles, paid digital downloads, streaming media, music videos, music DVDs, and master ringtones. Additionally, some certifying bodies have separate threshold scales for works of domestic or international origins, varying genres, lengths, and formats. From the 2010s digital streaming was included in some territories.

== Albums ==
Note: Top numbers represent threshold for domestic material, italicized numbers in parentheses represent threshold for international material if different from the domestic requirement. Other notes and exceptions are provided in footnotes below each table.

"—" denotes that an award is not given by the certifying body.

Thresholds of certification for albums, by country or territory
Country/ Territory	Certifying body	Thresholds per award				
Country/ Territory	Certifying body	Silver	Gold	Platinum	Diamond	Based on
Argentina	Argentine Chamber of Phonograms and Videograms Producers (CAPIF) Note: Only as of 1 July 2016	—	10,000	20,000	135,000	
Australia^{[I]}	Australian Recording Industry Association (ARIA)	20,000	35,000	70,000	500,000	Shipments
Austria	International Federation of the Phonographic Industry – Austria Note: As of January 1, 2013	—	7,500	15,000	—	
Belgium	Belgian Recorded Music Association (BRMA)	—	10,000	20,000	100,000	Sales, downloads and streaming combined
Brazil	Pro-Música Brasil (PMB) Note: As of 1 January 2010	—	40,000 (20,000)	80,000 (40,000)	300,000 (160,000)	Shipments
Bulgaria	Bulgarian Association of Music Producers (BAMP)	—	1,000	2,000	—	Sales
Canada	Music Canada	—	40,000	80,000	800,000	Shipments
Chile	International Federation of the Phonographic Industry – Chile Note: Only as of 2009	—	7,500	15,000	—	Shipments
China	State Administration of Radio, Film, and Television	—	20,000 (10,000)	40,000 (20,000)	400,000 (200,000)	Shipments
Colombia	Asociación Colombiana de Productores de Fonogramas (ASINCOL) Note: As of 1 January 2003	—	10,000 (5,000)	20,000 (10,000)	200,000 (100,000)	—
Croatia	Croatian Phonographic Association (HDU)	1,000	3,000	5,000	10,000	Sales
Czech Republic	International Federation of the Phonographic Industry – Czech Republic Note: As of 9 March 2026	—	^{[XVII]}	^{[XVII]}	—	Subscription stream equivalent
Denmark^{[I]}	IFPI Danmark Note: As of 7 January 2011	—	10,000	20,000	—	Shipments
Ecuador	International Federation of the Phonographic Industry – Ecuador	—	3,000	6,000	—	
Finland^{[I]}	Musiikkituottajat Note: Only as of 1 January 2010	—	10,000	20,000	—	Sales
France	SNEP Note: Only as of 1 July 2009	—	50,000	100,000	500,000	Sales
Germany^{[I]}^{[III]}	Bundesverband Musikindustrie (BVMI)	—	75,000	150,000	750,000	Shipments; streaming from June 2023
Greece	IFPI Greece	—	6,000 (3,000)	12,000 (6,000)	—	Shipments
Hong Kong	International Federation of the Phonographic Industry – Hong Kong Note: As of 1 January 2008	—	15,000 (7,500)	30,000 (15,000)	—	Sales
Hungary^{[IV]}	Association of Hungarian Record Companies (MAHASZ) Note: Only as of 14 December 2012	—	2,000 (1,000)	4,000 (2,000)	—	
Iceland	Félag hljómplötuframleiðenda (FHF)	—	2,500	5,000	50,000	Sales and streaming
India^{[V]}	Indian Music Industry (IMI)	—	100,000 (4,000)	200,000 (6,000)	—	Sales
Indonesia	Asosiasi Industri Rekaman Indonesia (ASIRI)	—	35,000 (5,000)	75,000 (10,000)	—	Sales
Ireland	Irish Recorded Music Association (IRMA)	—	7,500	15,000	—	Shipments
Israel	Israeli Federation of the Phonographic Industry	—	15,000 (10,000)	30,000 (20,000)	—	Shipments
Italy	Federation of the Italian Music Industry (FIMI) Note: As of 1 January 2014	—	25,000	50,000	500,000	Sales
Japan	Recording Industry Association of Japan (RIAJ)	—	100,000	250,000	1,000,000^{[XX]}	Shipments
Latvia	Latvian Music Producers Association (LaIPA)	—	5,000	9,000	—	
Lebanon^{[II]}	International Federation of the Phonographic Industry – Lebanon	—	20,000 (1,000)	40,000 (2,000)	—	
Malaysia^{[VI]}	Recording Industry Association of Malaysia (RIM)	—	5,000	10,000	—	Sales
Mexico^{[VII]}	Asociación Mexicana de Productores de Fonogramas y Videogramas (AMPROFON)	—	70,000	140,000	700,000	Sales and streaming
Netherlands^{[VIII]}	NVPI	—	20,000	40,000	—	Shipments
New Zealand	Recorded Music NZ	—	7,500	15,000	—	Shipments
Nigeria	TurnTable Certification System of Nigeria	12,500	25,000	50,000	—	Streaming
Norway^{[I]}^{[IX]}	IFPI Norge Note: Only as of 1 January 2018	—	10,000	20,000	—	Sales and streaming
Paraguay	Sociedad de Gestión de Productores Fonográficos del Paraguay (SGP)	—	5,000	10,000	—	
Peru	Unión Peruana de Productores Fonográficos (UNIMPRO)	—	3,000	6,000	—	
Philippines	Philippine Association of the Record Industry (PARI)	—	7,500	15,000	150,000	Sales, downloads and streaming combined
Poland^{[I]}^{[IX]}	Polish Society of the Phonographic Industry (ZPAV) Note: Only as of July 2005	—	15,000 (10,000)	30,000 (20,000)	150,000 (100,000)	Sales, downloads and streaming combined
Portugal	Associação Fonográfica Portuguesa (AFP)	—	3,500	7,000	70,000	
Romania	Uniunea Producătorilor de Fonograme din România (UPFR)	Unknown^{[XVI]}				
Russia	National Federation of Phonograph Producers (NFPF) (2001–2018). InterMedia (since 2010). Note: Only as of 2019	—	25,000 (5,000)	50,000 (10,000)		Sales
Singapore	Recording Industry Association Singapore (RIAS)	—	5,000	10,000	—	Sales
Slovakia	International Federation of the Phonographic Industry – Czech Republic^{[XVIII]} Note: As of 9 March 2026	—	^{[XVIX]}	^{[XVIX]}	—	Subscription stream equivalent
South Africa^{[XII]}	Recording Industry of South Africa (RiSA)	—	15,000	30,000	—	Sales+streaming
South Korea	Korea Music Content Industry Association (Gaon) Note: As of April 20, 2018	—	—	250,000	1,000,000^{[XV]}	Shipments
Spain	Productores de Música de España (Promusicae)	—	20,000	40,000	—	Shipments
Sweden^{[XI]}^{[I]}	IFPI Sverige Note: Only as of 1 January 2018	—	15,000	30,000	—	Shipments
Switzerland	International Federation of the Phonographic Industry – Switzerland Note: Only as of 2013, excluding French and Italian Repertoire	—	10,000	20,000	—	
Taiwan	Recording Industry Foundation in Taiwan (RIT) Note: as of 1 January 2011	—	15,000 (5,000)	30,000 (10,000)	—	Sales
Thailand	Thai Entertainment Content Trade Association (TECA)	—	10,000 (5,000)	20,000 (10,000)	—	Sales
Turkey	Mü-Yap	—	50,000 (3,000)	100,000 (5,000)	150,000 (10,000)	Sales
Ukraine	International Federation of the Phonographic Industry – Ukraine	—	50,000 (25,000)	100,000 (50,000)	500,000 (100,000)	
United Kingdom^{[XIII]}^{[I]}	British Phonographic Industry (BPI)	60,000	100,000	300,000	—	Shipments, streaming from June 2015
United States^{[I]}	Recording Industry Association of America (RIAA)	—	500,000; 30,000 (Latin certification)	1,000,000; 60,000 (L)	10,000,000; 600,000 (L)	Shipments and Streaming from 2016
Uruguay	Cámara Uruguaya de Productores de Fonogramas y Videogramas (CUD)	—	2,000	4,000	—	
Venezuela	Asociación Venezolana de Intérpretes y Productores de Fonogramas (AVINPRO)	—	5,000	10,000		
International or multi-national agencies
Europe^{[XIV]}	International Federation of the Phonographic Industry	—	—	1,000,000	10,000,000	Sales
Europe	Independent Music Companies Association (IMPALA)	20,000	75,000	400,000	200,000	Shipments
GCC^{[II]}	International Federation of the Phonographic Industry	—	10,000 (3,000)	20,000 (6,000)	—	Sales

I Australian, Belgian, Danish, Finnish, German, Hungarian, Mexican, Norwegian, Polish, Spanish, Swedish, British and American figures can include digital album sales.
II GCC sales refer to sales in Bahrain, Kuwait, Oman, Qatar, Saudi Arabia and UAE.
III For German sales, the thresholds in the table are for albums released from January 1, 2003. For albums released until September 24, 1999, the thresholds are 250,000 for Gold and 500,000 for Platinum. For albums released between September 25, 1999, and December 31, 2002, the thresholds are 150,000 for Gold and 300,000 for Platinum. Also, for Jazz albums, the thresholds are 10,000 for Gold and 20,000 for Platinum. Diamond-award is applicable to titles released on/after January 1, 2013.
IV Hungarian sales figures provided refer to "Pop" albums. A separate scale is used for jazz, spoken word, classical, and world music albums: sales exceeding 1,500 and 3,000 for Gold and Platinum awards respectively.
V Indian figures provided refer to "Hindi Films" and "International" scales. However, there are six separate release scales in all. Each scale is provided here with Gold and Platinum sales thresholds in parentheses: "Hindi Films" (100,000; 200,000); "Regional Films" (50,000; 100,000); "Regional Basic" (25,000, 50,000); "National Basic" (50,000; 100,000); "Classical/Non-Classical" (15,000; 30,000); and "International" (4,000; 6,000). In addition, there is a time limit for an album in one of the categories to reach gold and platinum, which is in one calendar year (for example: albums released on July 1, 2006, has only until June 30, 2007, for a Gold or Platinum award).
VI Malaysian sales figures provided refer to albums released after 1 July 2009. For albums released before 1 July 2009, sales exceeding 10,000 and 20,000 for Gold and Platinum awards, respectively. Physical albums only; when combined with digital sales, thresholds are 15,000 for Gold and 30,000 for Platinum, whereby the digital sales are counted as 1/10 actual digital sales (10 downloads = 1 unit).
VII For Mexican sales, albums add physical, digital and streaming sales, for singles digital and streaming sales are taken into account. It should also be noted that Mexico awards incremental gold certifications even after platinum has been achieved, so an album may be, for example, certified 2× Platinum + Gold.
VIII Dutch sales figures provided refer to "Popular" albums. A separate scale is used for jazz, classical, and world music albums: sales exceeding 10,000 and 20,000 for Gold and Platinum awards respectively.
IX In Norway, the thresholds were previously 15,000 units for Gold and 30,000 units for Platinum.
X Polish sales figures provided refer to domestic "Pop" albums. Separate scales are used for jazz/blues/folk/source music/classical albums, and soundtracks. Each scale is provided here with Gold, Platinum, and Diamond sales thresholds in parentheses: "jazz/blues/folk/source music/classical" (5,000; 10,000; 50,000); and "soundtracks" (10,000; 20,000; 100,000).
XI Swedish sales figures provided refer to "Pop" albums. A separate scale is used for children, jazz, classical, and folk music albums: sales exceeding 10,000 and 20,000 for Gold and Platinum awards respectively.
XII South African sales figures provided refer to albums released after 1 December 2015. For albums released before 1 December 2015 but after 1 August 2006, a Gold award is given for sales exceeding 20,000 and a Platinum award for sales exceeding 40,000. For albums released before 1 August 2006, a Gold award is given for sales exceeding 25,000, a Platinum award for sales exceeding 50,000.
XIII United Kingdom thresholds were established in 1979 for albums above a minimum RRP. From 1973–79 the thresholds were based on monetary revenue: Platinum (£1,000,000), Gold (£150,000 from April 1973 to September 1974, £250,000 from September 1974 to January 1977, and £300,000 from 1977 until 1979) and Silver (£75,000 from April 1973 to January 1975, £100,000 from January 1975 to January 1977, and £150,000 from 1977 until 1979).
XIV Awarded for actual retail sales in the following countries: Austria, Belgium, Bulgaria, Czech Republic, Denmark, Finland, France, Germany, Greece, Hungary, Iceland, Ireland, Italy, Luxembourg, Netherlands, Norway, Poland, Portugal, Russia, Serbia, Slovakia, Spain, Sweden, Switzerland, Turkey and United Kingdom.
XV South Korean physical album sales exceeding 1,000,000 are given the "Million" award.
XVI Although UPFR's certifications levels have never been clearly defined, it is known that they have been repeatedly lowered since their introduction, due to heavy music piracy and financial crisises in Romania. UPFR's certifications are based on both the units sold and the sales price of an album. Several awards have been handed out since the early 1990s.
XVII Czech certifications for albums are based on subscription stream equivalent of 5,000,000 for Gold and 10,000,000 for Platinum.
XVIII Previously, thresholds of 2,000 units (Gold) and 4,000 units (Platinum) were used in Slovakia.
XVIX Slovak certifications for albums are based on subscription stream equivalent of 1,750,000 for Gold and 3,500,000 for Platinum.

== Singles ==
"—" denotes that an award is not given by the certifying body.

Thresholds of certification for singles (physical only or any format), by country or territory
Country/ Territory	Certifying body	Thresholds per award				
Country/ Territory	Certifying body	Silver	Gold	Platinum	Diamond	Based on
Argentina	Argentine Chamber of Phonograms and Videograms Producers (CAPIF)	—	10,000	20,000	135,000	
Australia^{[XIV]}	Australian Recording Industry Association (ARIA)	—	35,000	70,000	—	Shipments
Austria	International Federation of the Phonographic Industry – Austria	—	15,000	30,000	—	
Belgium	Belgian Recorded Music Association (BRMA)	—	10,000 (20,000)	20,000 (40,000)	100,000 (200,000)	Sales, downloads and streaming combined
Canada	Music Canada - Single or (Digital Download)	—	5,000 (40,000)	10,000 (80,000)	100,000 (800,000)	
Czech Republic^{[XX]}	International Federation of the Phonographic Industry – Czech Republic	—	^{[XXI]}	^{[XXI]}	—	Subscription stream equivalent
Denmark^{[XIV]}	IFPI Danmark Note: As of 1 April 2016	—	4,500,000	9,000,000	—	Sales and streaming (from 2016)
Finland^{[XIV]}	Musiikkituottajat – IFPI Finland Note: As of 1 January 2014 and applying retroactively	—	2,000,000	4,000,000	—	Sales and streaming (from 2014)
France^{[XIV]}^{[XXIII]}	National Syndicate of Phonographic Publishing (SNEP) Note: Only as of July 2024	—	15,000,000	30,000,000	50,000,000	Sales and streaming (since 2016)
Germany^{[XIV]}^{[XV]}	The Federal Association of Music Industry (BVMI) Note: Only as of June 1, 2014	—	300,000	600,000	1,500,000	Shipments (streaming from June 2023)
Greece	IFPI Greece	—	3,000	6,000	—	Shipments
Hong Kong	International Federation of the Phonographic Industry – Hong Kong	—	15,000 (7,500)	30,000 (15,000)	—	Sales
Hungary	Association of Hungarian Record Companies (MAHASZ) Note: As of 1 January 2010	—	1,500	3,000	—	
India^{[XIV]}^{[XXIV]}	Indian Music Industry (IMI)	—	120,000 (60,000)	240,000 (120,000)	—	Sales and streams
Ireland^{[XIV]}	Irish Recorded Music Association (IRMA)	—	7,500	15,000	—	
Italy^{[XIV]}	Federation of the Italian Music Industry (FIMI)	—	100,000	200,000	2,000,000	Sales and streaming (since 2014; premium only since 2018; ad-supported since 2024)
Japan	Recording Industry Association of Japan (RIAJ)	—	100,000	250,000	1,000,000	Shipments
Latvia^{[XIV]}	Latvian Performers' and Producers' Association (LaIPA)	—	2,000,000	4,000,000	—	Sales and streaming
Lithuania^{[XIV]}	Lithuanian Neighbouring Rights Association (AGATA)	—	2,500,000	4,000,000	6,000,000	Sales and streaming
Mexico	Mexican Association of Producers of Phonograms and Videograms (AMPROFON)	—	70,000	140,000	700,000	Sales+Streaming (since November 1, 2020)
Netherlands^{[XIV]}	NVPI Note: Only as of 1 January 2024	—	10,000,000	20,000,000	50,000,000	Sales and streaming
New Zealand^{[XIV]}	Recorded Music NZ	—	15,000	30,000	—	Sales
Nigeria	TurnTable Certification System of Nigeria	25,000	50,000	100,000	—	Streaming
Norway^{[XVII]}^{[XVII]}	International Federation of the Phonographic Industry – Norway Note: Only as of 1 January 2018	—	3,000,000	6,000,000	—	Sales + streaming
Philippines	Philippine Association of the Record Industry (PARI) Note: Only as of 1 July 2012	—	7,500	15,000	—	Sales
Poland	Polish Society of the Phonographic Industry (ZPAV) Note: Only as of August 2021	—	25,000	50,000	250,000	Sales
Portugal	Phonographic Association of Portugal (AFP)	—	5,000	10,000	100,000	
Slovakia	International Federation of the Phonographic Industry – Czech Republic	—	^{[XXII]}	^{[XXII]}	—	Revenue based on sales and streams
Singapore	Recording Industry Association Singapore (RIAS)	—	5,000	10,000	—	Sales
South Africa	Recording Industry of South Africa (RISA)	—	10,000	20,000	—	Sales + streaming
Spain	Producers of Spanish Music (PROMUSICAE)	—	50,000	100,000	—	Sales
Sweden^{[XIV]}	IFPI Sverige Note: As of January 1, 2024	—	6,000,000	12,000,000	—	Shipments (Streaming only from January 2018)
Switzerland	International Federation of the Phonographic Industry – Switzerland Note: As of July 2023	—	15,000	30,000	—	
Taiwan	Recording Industry Foundation in Taiwan (RIT) Note: Only as of 1 January 2011	—	5,000	10,000	—	Sales
Thailand	Thai Entertainment Content Trade Association (TECA)	—	10,000 (5,000)	20,000 (10,000)	—	Sales
United Kingdom^{[XIV]}^{[XVIII]}	British Phonographic Industry (BPI)	200,000	400,000	600,000	—	Shipments (streaming from July 2014)
United States^{[XIX]}	Recording Industry Association of America (RIAA)	—	500,000	1,000,000	10,000,000	Shipments (streaming from May 2013)
International or multi-national agencies
South Africa^{[XIV]}	Recording Industry of South Africa (RISA)	—	20,000	40,000	—	Sales and streaming

XIV Australian, Danish, Dutch, Finnish, French, German, Indian, Irish, Italian, Latvian, Lithuanian, New Zealand, Norwegian, South African, Swedish, and British figures can include sales from legal digital downloads.
XV For German sales, the thresholds in the table are for singles released from January 1, 2003. For singles released prior to that thresholds are 250,000 for Gold and 500,000 for Platinum. As of June 1, 2014, the German thresholds for the single-titles, are 200,000 for Gold and 400,000 for Platinum. German industry also introduced a Diamond-award which is applicable to all titles released on/after January 1, 2013. For Jazz singles, the thresholds are 10,000 for Gold and 20,000 for Platinum.
XVI Malaysian sales figures for physical singles only; when combined with digital sales, thresholds are 15,000 for Gold and 30,000 for Platinum, whereby the digital sales are counted as 1/10 actual digital sales (10 downloads = 1 unit).
XVII In Norway, the thresholds were previously 2,000,000 units for Gold and 4,000,000 units for Platinum.
XVIII In the United Kingdom, the number of sales required to qualify for Platinum, Gold and Silver discs was dropped for singles released after 1 January 1989 to the current thresholds of Silver (200,000 units), Gold (400,000 units), and Platinum (600,000 units). Prior to this the thresholds were Silver (250,000 units), Gold (500,000 units), and Platinum (1,000,000 units).
XIX In the United States, the number of sales required to qualify for Platinum and Gold discs was dropped to the current thresholds of Gold (500,000 units) and Platinum (1,000,000 units), effective 1 January 1989; prior to this the thresholds were Gold (1,000,000 units), and Platinum (2,000,000 units). For EP-length configurations including the 12-inch single, the thresholds were lowered to Gold (250,000 units) and Platinum (500,000 units); previously the thresholds were Gold (500,000 units) and Platinum (1,000,000 units). From then on, the lowered thresholds applied to certification of all singles, regardless of whether they were released before or after the change.
XX Previously, thresholds of 1,000 units (Platinum) and 2,000 units (Diamond) were used in the Czech Republic.
XXI Czech certifications for singles are based on subscription stream equivalent of 2,000,000 for Gold and 5,000,000 for Platinum.
XXII Slovak certifications for singles are based on subscription stream equivalent of 850,000 for Gold and 1,700,000 for Platinum.
XXIII Previously, thresholds of 75,000 units (Gold), 150,000 units (Platinum), and 250,000 units (Diamond) were used in France.
XXIV In India, the thresholds of 60,000 units (Gold) and 120,000 units (Platinum) are used for songs from regional films and pop/basic songs, as well as international songs. For devotional songs, thresholds of 50,000 units (Gold) and 100,000 units (Platinum) are used, whereas for classical and folk music, thresholds of 10,000 units (Gold) and 20,000 units (Platinum) are used.

=== Digital download singles ===
"—" denotes that an award is not given by the certifying body.

Thresholds of certification for singles (digital only), by country or territory
Country/ Territory	Certifying body	Thresholds per award		
Country/ Territory	Certifying body	Gold	Platinum	Diamond
Argentina	Argentine Chamber of Phonograms and Videograms Producers (CAPIF)	10,000	20,000	135,000
Brazil	Pro-Música Brasil (PMB)Note: As of November 2017	40,000 (20,000)	80,000 (40,000)	300,000 (160,000)
Canada	Music Canada Note: As of October 2010	40,000	80,000	800,000
Egypt	International Federation of the Phonographic Industry – Egypt	20,000	40,000	—
Japan^{[XX]}	Recording Industry Association of Japan (RIAJ)	100,000	250,000	1,000,000^{[XXI]}
Mexico	Mexican Association of Phonograph Producers (AMPROFON) Note: Only as of 1 January 2010	30,000	60,000	300,000
South Korea	Korea Music Content Association (KMCA); Note: Applied for songs released on or after January 1, 2018	—	2,500,000	10,000,000^{[XIV]}
Spain	Producers of Spanish Music (PROMUSICAE)	20,000	40,000	—
United States	Recording Industry Association of America (RIAA)	500,000	1,000,000	10,000,000

XX Japanese awards refer to online singles and mobile singles.
XXI Japanese physical and digital download sales exceeding 1,000,000 are given the "Million" award.

=== Streaming-only singles ===
"—" denotes that an award is not given by the certifying body.

Thresholds of certification for singles (digital only), by country or territory
Country/ Territory	Certifying body	Thresholds per award		
Country/ Territory	Certifying body	Gold	Platinum	Diamond
Iceland	Félag hljómplötuframleiðenda (FHF)	750,000	1,500,000	—
Japan	Recording Industry Association of Japan (RIAJ); Note: Starting April 2020	50,000,000	100,000,000	500,000,000
South Korea	Korea Music Content Association (KMCA); Note: Applied for songs released on or after January 1, 2018	—	100,000,000	1,000,000,000

XX Japanese awards refer to online singles and mobile singles.
XXI Japanese physical and digital download sales exceeding 1,000,000 are given the "Million" award.

== Music videos/DVDs ==
"—" denotes that an award is not given by the certifying body.

Thresholds of certification for music videos and DVDs, by country or territory
Country/ Territory	Certifying body	Thresholds per award			
Country/ Territory	Certifying body	Gold	Platinum	Diamond	Based on
Argentina	Argentine Chamber of Phonograms and Videograms Producers (CAPIF) Note: As of 1 July 2016	5,000	10,000	50,000	
Australia	Australian Recording Industry Association (ARIA)	7,500	15,000	—	Shipments
Austria	International Federation of the Phonographic Industry – Austria	5,000	10,000	—	
Belgium	Belgian Entertainment Association (BEA)	25,000	50,000		Sales
Brazil	Pro-Música Brasil (PMB)	25,000 (15,000)	50,000 (30,000)	250,000 (125,000)	Sales
Canada	Music Canada	5,000	10,000	100,000	Shipments
Colombia	Colombian Association of Phonograph Producers (ASINCOL)	5,000	10,000	—	
Czech Republic	International Federation of the Phonographic Industry – Czech Republic	1,500	3,000	—	
Denmark^{[XXI]}	IFPI Denmark Note: As of 1 April 2009	7,500	15,000	—	Shipments
Finland	Musiikkituottajat – IFPI Finland Note: As of 1 January 2010	5,000	10,000	—	Sales
France	National Syndicate of Phonographic Publishing (SNEP) Note: Only as of 1 July 2010	7,500	15,000	60,000	Sales
Germany	The Federal Association of Music Industry (BVMI)	25,000	50,000	—	Shipments
Greece	IFPI Greece	3,000	6,000	—	Shipments
Hungary^{[XXII]}	Association of Hungarian Record Companies (MAHASZ) Note: As of 1 January 2007	2,000	4,000	—	
Iceland	IFPI IcelandNote: As of 2013	5,000	10,000	—	
Ireland	Irish Recorded Music Association (IRMA)	2,000	4,000	—	
Japan	Recording Industry Association of Japan (RIAJ)	100,000	250,000	1,000,000	
Mexico	Mexican Association of Phonograph Producers (AMPROFON)	10,000	20,000	—	
Netherlands	The Dutch Association of Producers and Importers of Image and Sound Carriers (NVPI)	25,000	50,000	—	Shipments
New Zealand	Recording Industry Association of New Zealand (RIANZ)	2,500	5,000	—	
Norway	International Federation of the Phonographic Industry – Norway Note: Only as of 2007	5,000	10,000	—	Sales
Philippines	Philippine Association of the Record Industry (PARI)	7,500	15,000	—	Sales
Poland^{[XXIII]}	Polish Society of the Phonographic Industry (ZPAV)	5,000	10,000	—	Sales
Portugal	Phonographic Association of Portugal (AFP)	4,000	8,000	—	
Slovakia	International Federation of the Phonographic Industry – Slovakia	500	1,000	—	
Spain	Producers of Spanish Music (PROMUSICAE)	10,000	25,000	—	
Sweden	International Federation of the Phonographic Industry – Sweden	10,000	20,000	—	Shipments
Switzerland	International Federation of the Phonographic Industry – Switzerland	3,000	6,000	—	
United Kingdom	British Phonographic Industry (BPI)	25,000	50,000	—	Shipments
United States^{[XXIV]}	Recording Industry Association of America (RIAA)	50,000	100,000	—	Shipments
Uruguay	Cámara Uruguaya de Productores de Fonogramas y Videogramas (CUD) Note: As of 1 September 2007	1,000	2,000	—	

XXI Danish DVD sales figures provided refer to Music/Single DVDs. Full-length DVDs are on a differing scale: sales exceeding 10,000 and 20,000 for Gold and Platinum awards (beginning January 7, 2011), reduced from 15,000 and 30,000 copies, respectively.
XXII Hungarian DVD sales figures provided refer to "Pop" DVDs. A separate scale is used for jazz, spoken word, classical, and world music DVDs: sales exceeding 1,000 and 2,000 for Gold and Platinum awards respectively.
XXIII Polish sales figures provided refer to "Pop" music videos. A separate scale is used for jazz/classical music videos: sales exceeding 2,500, 5,000, and 25,000 for Gold, Platinum, and Diamond awards respectively.
XXIV U.S. sales figures provided refer to "Video singles". A separate scale is used for "Long form videos" and "Multi-Box Music Video Sets": sales exceeding 50,000 and 100,000 for Gold and Platinum awards respectively.

== Master ringtones ==
"—" denotes that an award is not given by the certifying body.

Thresholds of certification for master ringtones, by country or territory
Country/ Territory	Certifying body	Thresholds per award				
Country/ Territory	Certifying body	Gold	Platinum	Double Platinum	Diamond	Based on
Brazil	Brazilian Association of Discs Producers (ABPD)	50,000 (30,000)	100,000 (60,000)	—	500,000 (250,000)	
Canada	Music Canada	20,000	40,000	—	400,000	
Egypt	International Federation of the Phonographic Industry – Egypt	20,000	40,000	—	—	
Japan	Recording Industry Association of Japan (RIAJ)	100,000	250,000	500,000	1,000,000^{[XXV]}	
Mexico	Mexican Association of Phonograph Producers (AMPROFON) Note: Only as of 2009	40,000	80,000	—	400,000	Sales
Spain	Producers of Spanish Music (PROMUSICAE)	20,000	40,000	—	—	
United States	Recording Industry Association of America (RIAA)	500,000	1,000,000	—	—	

XXV Japanese master ringtone sales exceeding 1,000,000, is awarded "million", rather than "diamond".

== See also ==
- RIAA certification
- List of best-selling albums
  - List of best-selling albums by country
- List of best-selling singles
  - List of best-selling singles by country
- List of largest recorded music markets
