= Black Fender =

Single by Hans Edler
- Released: September 2010
- Recorded: 2010
- Label: PGM

"Black Fender" is an English language single by Swedish singer Hans Edler done as a tribute to Ricky Nelson. He performed the song during his live tour "Hans Edler meets Ricky Nelson" in December 2006. It has grown into a huge crowd favorite and sang at almost all his later concerts until he decided to release it as a single.

The song was finally released at the end of September 2010, making it straight to number one in the Swedish Singles Chart in its first week of release.

== Charts ==
Chart (2010)	Peak position
Swedish Singles Chart	1

== See also ==
- List of Swedish number-one hits
