= Swedish Recording Industry Association =

Swedish music industry organization

Grammofonleverantörernas förening (GLF) (English: Swedish Recording Industry Association), was an organisation representing the music recording industry of Sweden. It compiled and published the official record charts for the Swedish music recording industry since 1975, including the Swedish Albums Chart and Swedish Singles Chart, which is now done by IFPI Sverige. The charts are based on statistics of album and single sales, DVD-sales, digital sales as well as streams.

GLF had the following members: Bonnier Amigo Group, EMI Svenska AB, Network Entertainment Group, Sony Music Sweden AB, Sound Pollution AB, Universal Music Sweden AB, and Warner Music Group Sweden AB

- Sverigetopplistan, Swedish weekly charts for singles, albums, DVD, and downloads
