= Marathon Music Works =

Concert hall and event space in Nashville, Tennessee

Coordinates: 36.163963°N 86.797381°W

Marathon Music Works is a concert hall and event space located in Nashville, Tennessee. It is a locally owned and operated venue in the Marathon Village neighborhood.

== History and location ==
Originally constructed as an auto manufacturing plant to produce Marathon Automobiles in the early 1900s, Marathon Music Works was repurposed and opened its doors in November 2011 as a concert hall and event venue.

Marathon Music Works is situated in the Marathon Village neighborhood. The neighborhood emerged from the buildings that once housed Marathon Motor Works, a pioneering automobile factory that operated from 1910 to 1914. It held the distinction of being the first fully functional automobile manufacturing factory in the southern United States until General Motors introduced the Saturn in 1990.

== Name and ownership ==
The venue's name, Marathon Music Works, was selected through a local community process. Residents of Nashville submitted their ideas, and the chosen name pays tribute to the building's previous use as Marathon Motor Works, an automobile manufacturer.

== Notable performances ==
Marathon Music Works has welcomed a diverse range of national and international touring artists, establishing itself as a notable music venue. Over the years, the stage has hosted performances by Emmylou Harris, The Weeknd, Garth Brooks, Phantogram, 311, Johnny Marr, J. Cole, Spoon, Eric Church, Ice Cube, Avicii, Run The Jewels, Die Antwoord, Arctic Monkeys, Danzig, Twenty One Pilots, Gary Clark Jr., Ashley McBryde, and Brad Paisley.

== Management ==
Marathon Music Works is managed by Marathon Live. In addition to Marathon Music Works in Nashville, the company manages other midsize venues such as The Signal in Chattanooga, Tennessee; The Truman in Kansas City, Missouri; The Hall in Little Rock, Arkansas, The Hawthorn in St. Louis, Missouri, and FIVE in Jacksonville, FL.
