= Marathon Motor Works =

Defunct American motor vehicle manufacturer

- U.S. National Register of Historic Places
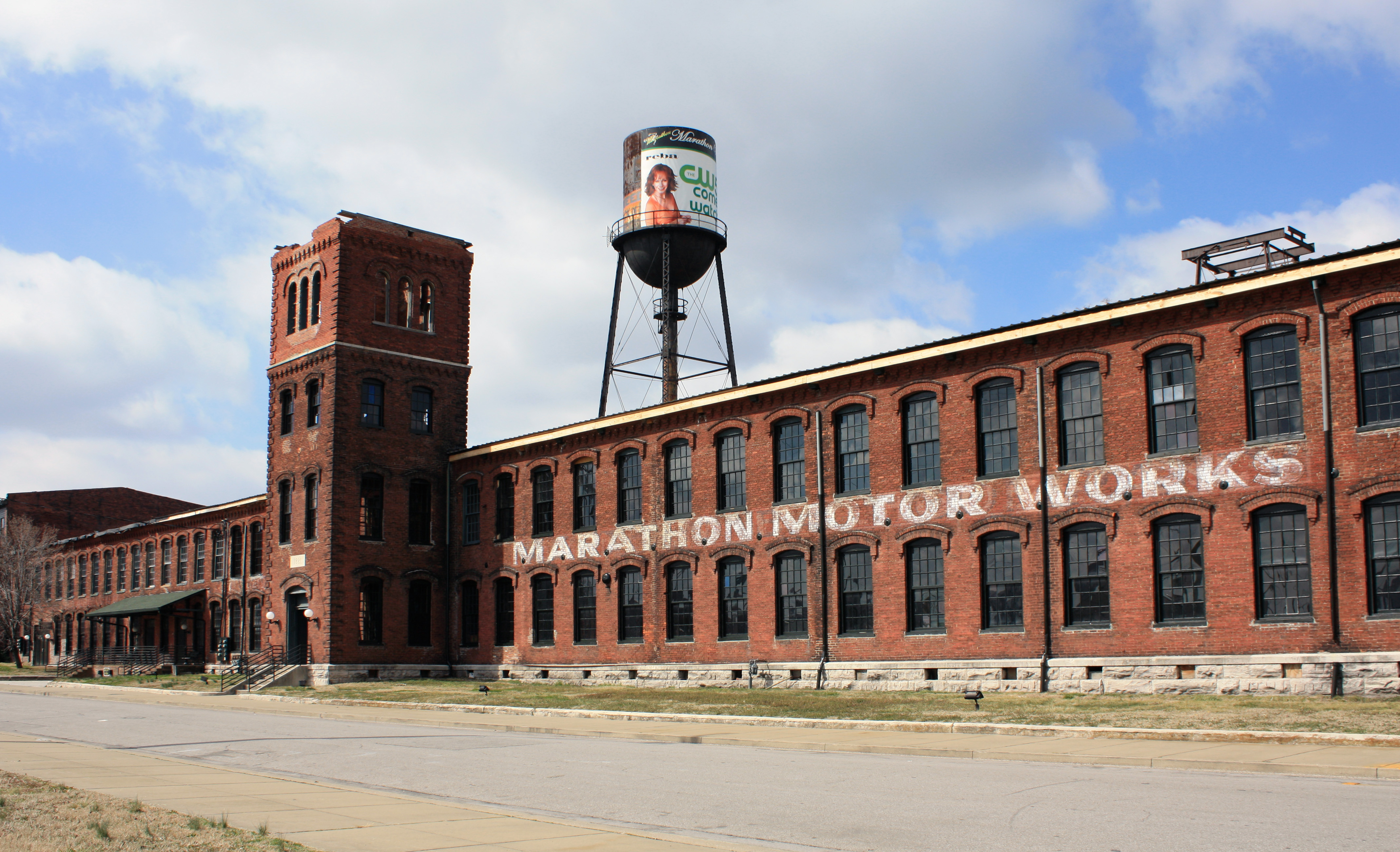
- Location: 1200–1310 and 1305 Clinton St., Nashville, Tennessee
- Coordinates: 36.16489°N 86.79551°W
- NRHP reference No.: 95001482
- Added to NRHP: January 4, 1996

Marathon Motor Works was a brass era automobile manufacturer based in Tennessee. Southern Engine and Boiler Works founded in 1889, which made industrial engines and boilers in Jackson, Tennessee, established the factory in 1907. From 1909 to 1914, the company manufactured the Marathon automobile in Nashville, Tennessee.

== History ==
Southern Engine and Boiler Works engineer, William Henry Collier, developed a gasoline engine and prototype automobile in 1906. Southern Engine built a few automobiles to Collier's design before expanding to a plant in Nashville. The Marathon Motor Works were established from a cotton mill complex.

Southern Engine decided to engineer and build every part of its automobile in-house. The vehicles had been marketed as Southerns at first, but another firm was using that name. In 1910, Marathon Motor Works was created to produce the Marathon automobile, named out of the enthusiasm for things Greek which had grown out of the 1904 Olympics.

1909 saw a two-model lineup, roadster and touring car, powered by 35 HP 4-cylinder engines. Both were open bodies (tops were optional) and sold for about $1,500. By 1912 production reached 200 cars monthly.

Marathons acquired a good reputation for quality and durability due to the factory controlling all parts, engineering and manufacturing. Demand exceeded supply, but financial improprieties were alleged and receivership soon followed. H. H. Brooks, General Sales Manager, arranged for Marathon sales to be handled by the Herff Brothers in 1913. The Herff-Brooks Corporation purchased the Marathon machinery and moved production and many workers to Richmond, Indiana.

== Museum and Building ==
On the National Register of Historic Places, the preserved building has a museum and shops. Although only nine Marathons are known to have survived, five of these are currently in the Marathon building's museum.

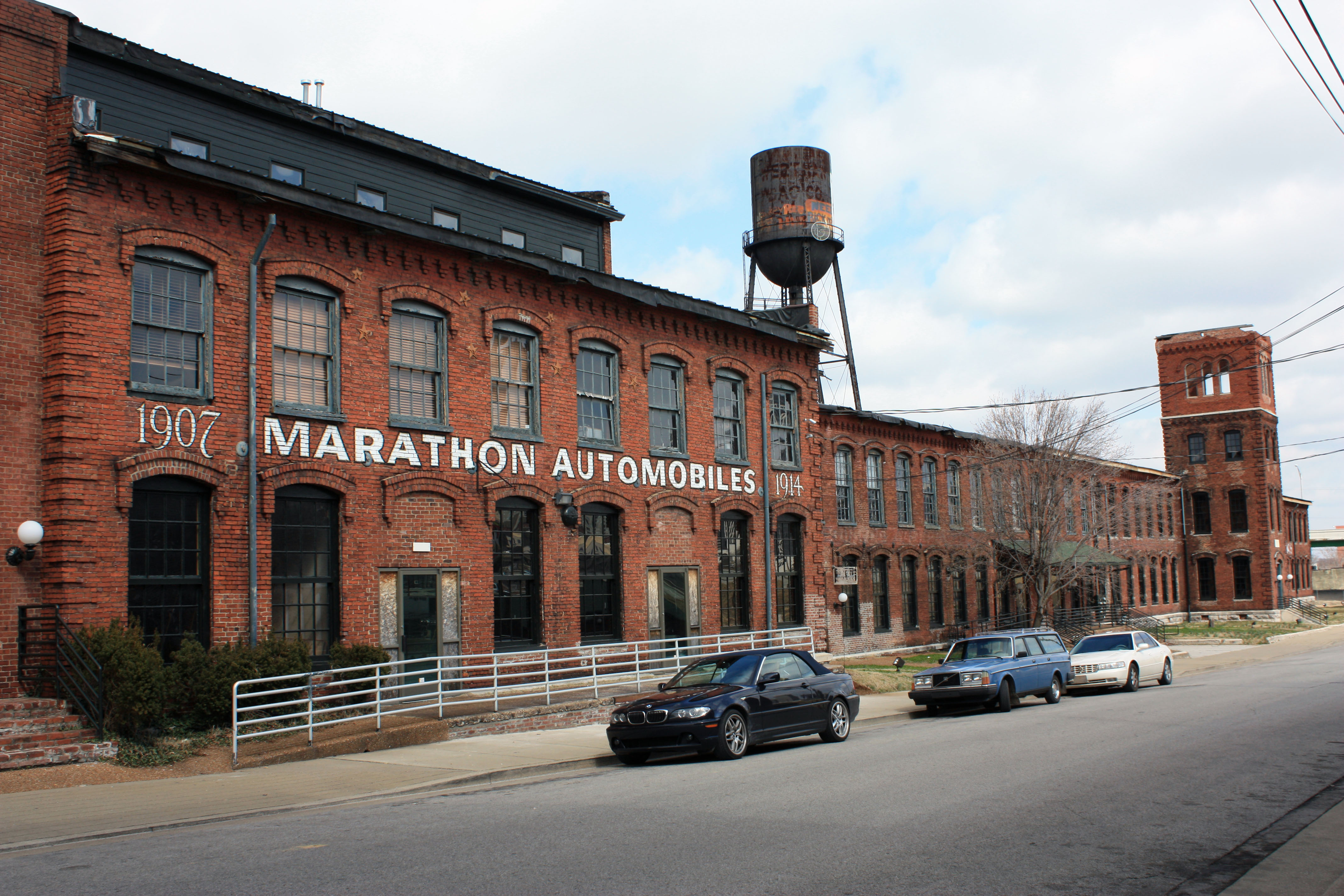
Marathon Motor Works in 2009

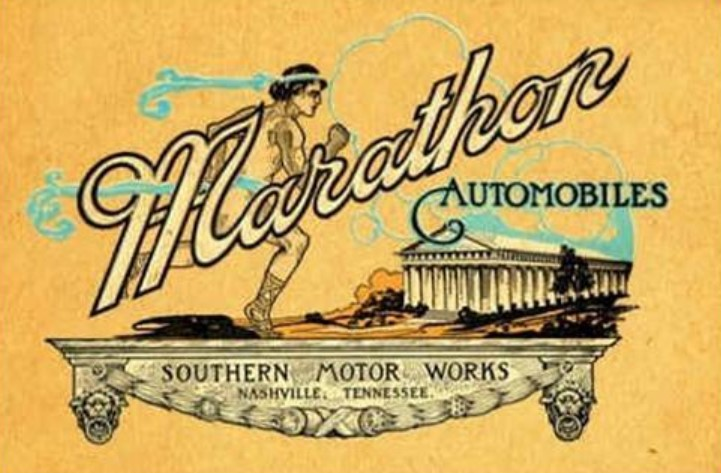
Marathon Brochure from 1910

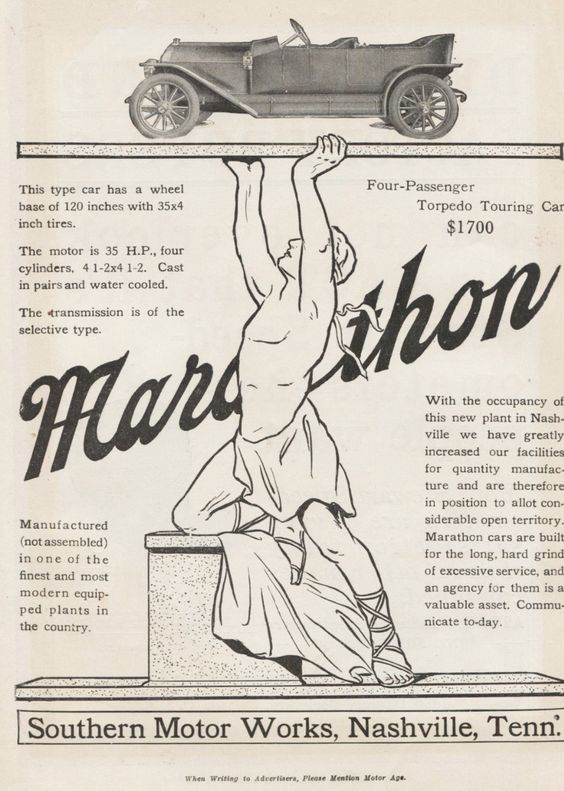
Marathon Advertisement from 1911

In 2008, a mystery novel called The Marathon Murders was published by Nashville author Chester Campbell. Although the murder itself is fictional, the book uses the documented disagreements and possible dishonesty among the board and executives to provide a plausible motive.

The Marathon Motor Works building houses an antique store called Antique Archaeology (the business at the center of the television series American Pickers). It was closed in April 2025.

Marathon Music Works is a mid-sized music venue & event space located in Marathon Village. The venue's name was selected through a local community process. Residents of Nashville submitted their ideas and the chosen name pays tribute to the building's previous use as Marathon Motor Works.
