= Alina Devecerski =

Swedish singer

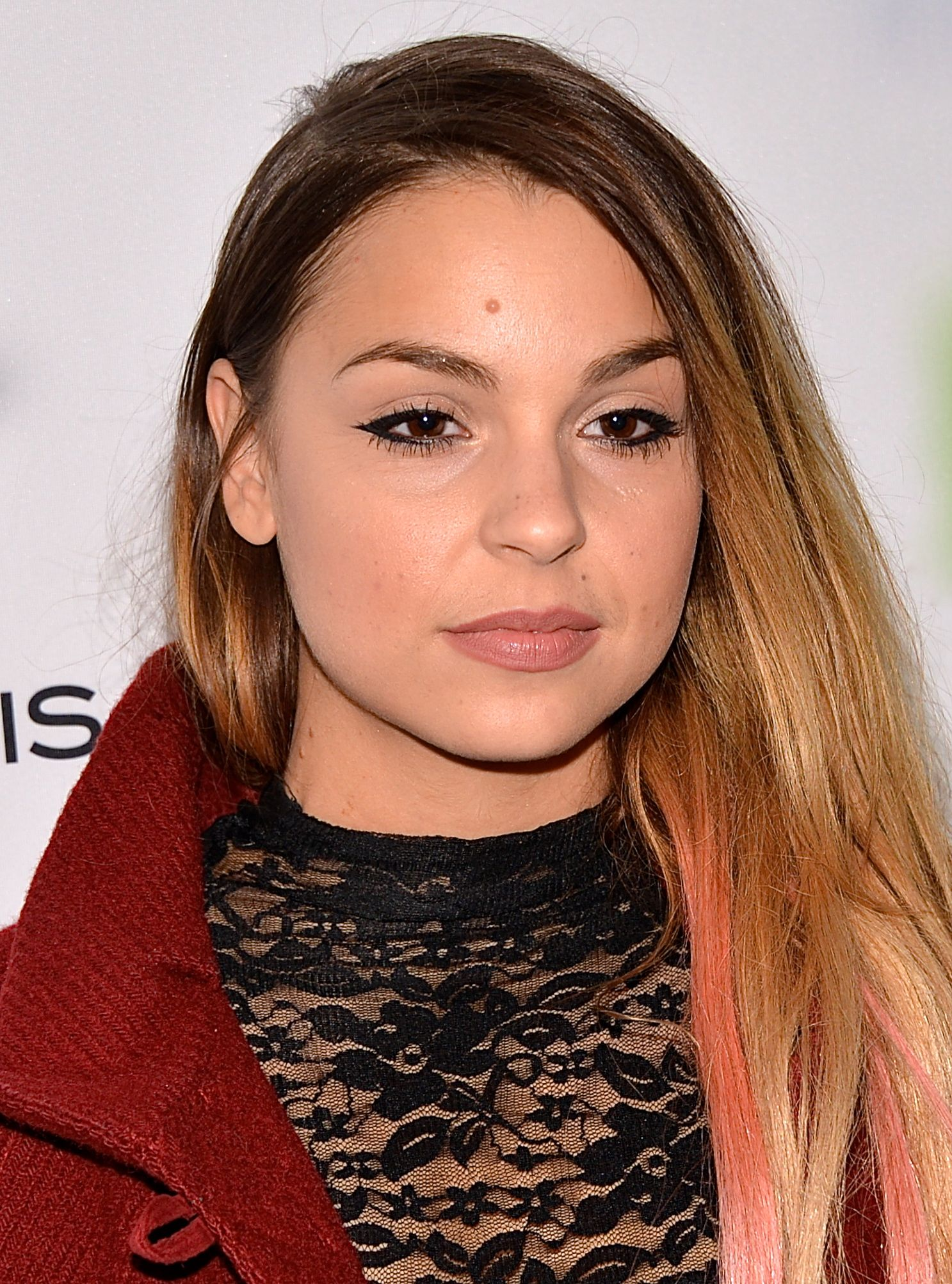
- Devecerski in 2013

Background information
- Born: Alina Natalie Devecerski; 27 March 1983 (age 42); Sundbyberg, Sweden
- Genres: Pop
- Occupation: Singer
- Years active: 2002–present
- Labels: EMI Sweden

Alina Natalie Devecerski (born 27 March 1983) is a Swedish pop singer from Sundbyberg. She is managed by Anders Johansson and signed to EMI Sweden.

At age 19, she started singing in a girl band. She has also written songs for many other artists. In 2010, she launched her solo career working for a year and a half writing solo material for herself only. Her 2012 debut single was "Flytta på dej!", which hit the Sverigetopplistan, the official Swedish Singles Chart and stayed at No. 1 for 2 weeks, and was No. 1 in Norway and Denmark, followed up by the single "Jag svär" in the same year. Following on her debut she toured with Veronica Maggio in the autumn of 2012 and was signed to appear at several music festivals in Sweden to promote her singing career. She released her debut album Maraton in November 2012.

== Discography ==
=== Albums ===
| Year | Title | Peak chart positions | | | Certification |
| Year | Title | SWE | DEN | NOR | Certification |
|---|---|---|---|---|---|
| 2012 | Maraton: Released: 19 November 2012; Record label: EMI | 36 | — | — | |

=== Singles ===
| Year | Title | Peak chart positions | | | Album |
| Year | Title | SWE | DEN | NOR | Album |
|---|---|---|---|---|---|
| 2012 | "Flytta på dej!" | 1 | 1 | 1 | Maraton |
| 2012 | "Jag svär" | — | — | — | Maraton |
| 2012 | "Ikväll skiter jag i allt" | — | — | — | Maraton |
| 2013 | "De e dark nu" | — | — | — | |
