= Sgt. Peppercorn's Marathon =

Live music event in Columbus, Ohio

Sgt. Peppercorn's Marathon (also known as The Beatles Marathon) is an annual live music event in Columbus, Ohio. Musician Joe Peppercorn and fellow musicians perform the entire catalog of The Beatles and select solo Beatles works over 13 hours. The Sgt. Peppercorn band is the only known Beatles tribute band to play all 214 songs recorded by the group in chronological order in a single live concert, and the event has occurred every year since 2010. The event title is a play on the Beatles album Sgt. Pepper's Lonely Hearts Club Band.

Paul McCartney introduced the 2019 concert by video. He said, "I wish you good luck and good stamina. The marathon is about to begin, and I’m about to kick you off with our first recording, and then you’ve got to carry on. Forever and ever and ever.”

Writer James Baumann called the marathon "Columbus' greatest cultural event" for its accessibility, transparency, and transformative nature.

== History ==
The Sgt. Peppercorn Marathon was started on Dec. 28 2010, with a solo performance by Joe Peppercorn in the Tree Bar.
