= Marathon Man =

Marathon Man may refer to:

- Marathon Man (novel), a 1974 novel by William Goldman
  - Marathon Man (film), a 1976 adaptation of the novel
- "Marathon Man", an episode of Forensic Files

== People with the nickname ==
- Aaron Krickstein (born 1967), American former professional tennis player
- Glenn Strömberg (born 1960), Swedish former footballer

== Songs ==
- "Marathon Man", by Akala from DoubleThink
- "Marathon Man", by Bear Hands from You'll Pay for This
- "Marathon Man", by David Arkenstone and Kostia, with David Lanz from The Spirit of Olympia
- "Marathon Man", by Eric Carmen from Boats Against the Current
- "Marathon Man", by Ian Brown from My Way
- "Marathon Man", by K-the-I??? from Yesterday, Today & Tomorrow
- "Marathon Man", by Wizzard from Introducing Eddy and the Falcons

== See also ==
- "Mr. Monk and the Marathon Man", an episode of Monk
- Eddie Izzard: Marathon Man, a 2010 television special featuring Eddie Izzard
- Pheidippides, central figure in the Marathon story
