= IFPI Sverige =

Recording industry association in Sweden

- Ifpi Sverige
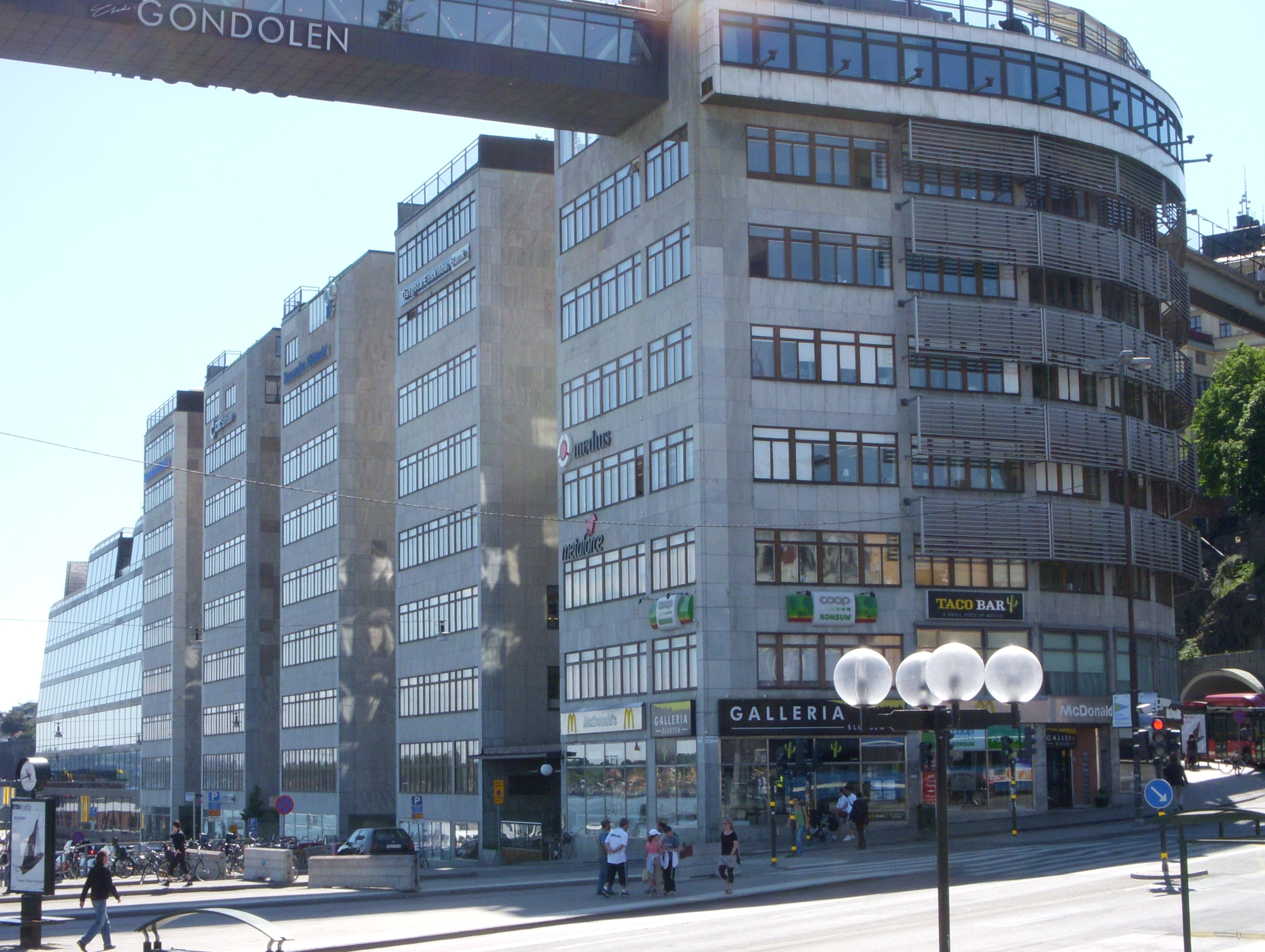
- IFPI Sverige's headquarters in Stockholm
- Established: 1934; 92 years ago
- Type: Nonprofit trade association
- VAT ID no.: SE802005018601
- Headquarters: Katarinahuset
- Location: Stockholm, Sweden
- Region served: Sweden
- Members: 40 (2024)
- Official language: Swedish
- CEO: Ludvig Verner
- Chairman: Mårten Aglander
- Main organ: Board
- Parent organisation: International Federation of the Phonographic Industry
- Subsidiaries: Grammotex
- Website: ifpi.se
- Formerly called: IFPI Svenska Gruppen

IFPI Sverige (sometimes referred to as IFPI Sweden; Swedish: Ifpi Sverige) is the trade association for the recording industry in Sweden. A branch of the International Federation of the Phonographic Industry (IFPI), it is responsible for the annual Grammis music awards, the Sverigetopplistan national record charts, and music recording certifications. Unlike other IFPI members, however, IFPI Sverige is also a music licensing company.

== History ==
The International Federation of the Phonographic Industry (IFPI) was founded in Rome in 1933, while IFPI Sverige was established in 1934 as one of the first national groups of the IFPI. Not much has been published about the organisation's first three decades until the 1960s; from 1963 to 1967, record sales in Sweden more than tripled and record labels became more important. The first Grammis ceremony was held in 1969 and they have been awarded annually ever since, except when they were discontinued in 1973–1987. In 1993, IFPI Sverige helped to establish Export Music Sweden. In 1999, IFPI Sverige began its first efforts against file sharing and music piracy. In 2013, its name changed from IFPI Svenska Gruppen to IFPI Sverige, accompanied by a new logo and rebranding. In 2024, the organisation moved to a new location at Katarinahuset in Stockholm's Slussen, after previous locales on Tegnérgatan, Birger Jarlsgatan, Ankdammsgatan in Solna, and Rödabergsgatan.

== Certifications ==
As of 1 January 2024, the following thresholds are used for awarding music recording certifications:

- Songs: 6 million for gold, 12 million for platinum
- Albums: 15,000 for gold, 30,000 for platinum
- Video albums: 5,000 for gold, 10,000 for platinum
- Folk, jazz, classical, or children's music: 10,000 for gold, 20,000 for platinum

Certifications for songs are based solely on streams, whereas certifications for albums are based on a combination of streams, digital downloads, and physical sales. Remixes of songs count toward the original song, while albums must contain at least five different tracks. Different versions of an album are counted together if at least 70% of tracks match the original.

== Members ==
As of 2024, IFPI Sverige has 40 members:

- Andersson Records
- Arietta
- Artist Company TEN
- BLNK Music
- BMG Rights Scandinavia
- Bolero Records
- Border Music
- Caprice Records
- Cosmos Music Group
- dB Productions
- Dragon Records
- Edler Music
- Fifth Island Music
- Four Leaf Clover Records
- Freebird Entertainment
- Gazell Records
- Imperial Recordings
- Jubel
- Ladybird Productions
- Lövbrand Productions
- Mono Music
- MusiCant Records
- Naxos Sweden
- Nosag Records
- Playground Music Scandinavia
- Pophouse Entertainment
- RMV Grammofon
- Remixed Records
- Riverside Records
- Snafu Records
- Sony Music Entertainment Sweden
- Sound Pollution Distribution
- Svenska oberoende musikproducenter
- The Kennel Recordings
- Today Is Vintage
- Täby City Music
- Universal Music Sweden
- Warner Music Sweden
- X5 Music Group
- Year0001
