= Marathon (automobile) =

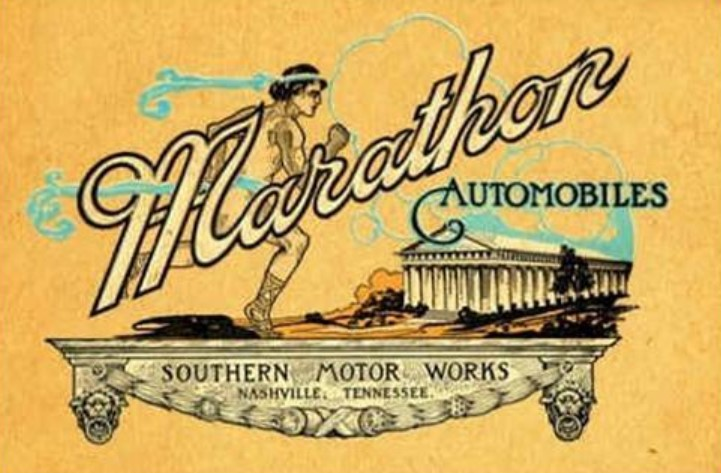
- Marathon Brochure Cover from 1910

Overview
- Manufacturer: Marathon Motor Works
- Production: 1908–1914
- Assembly: Nashville, Tennessee
- Designer: William Henry Collier

Body and chassis
- Body style: Touring, Roadster, Coupe

Powertrain
- Engine: Marathon Motor Works
- Transmission: Marathon Motor Works

Chronology
- Predecessor: Southern (Southern Motor Works)
- Successor: Herff-Brooks

The Marathon was an automobile built by the Marathon Motor Works company in Nashville, Tennessee, United States.

== History ==
First built in 1908 by the Southern Motor Works in Jackson, Tennessee, it was called the Southern. In 1910, Southern Motor Works built additional premises named the Marathon Motor Works in Nashville to produce the Marathon automobile.

The Marathon motor, a four-cylinder engine in unit with a transmission, was designed by William H. Collier of Southern Motor Works. By 1913, the Marathon was available in three different chassis sizes and at least 10 different body styles. The three chassis sizes were:

- Runner: 25 horse power, 104 inch wheelbase
- Winner: 35 horse power, 116 inch wheelbase
- Champion: 45 horse power, 123 inch wheelbase

In 1914 Marathon prices were mid-range from $975 to $1,470,(equivalent to $47,250 in 2025) The Marathon was popular with the public, and by 1912 was producing 200 cars monthly.

H. H. Brooks, General Sales Manager, arranged for an Indianapolis automaker to take over sales of the Marathon in 1913 while the company was having financial difficulties. In 1914 after Marathon went into receivership, Herff-Brooks purchased the Marathon machinery and moved it to Richmond, Indiana. The Marathon was continued as the Herff-Brooks for two seasons.

Only nine examples of the car are known to still exist, five of which are in Nashville.

== Gallery ==
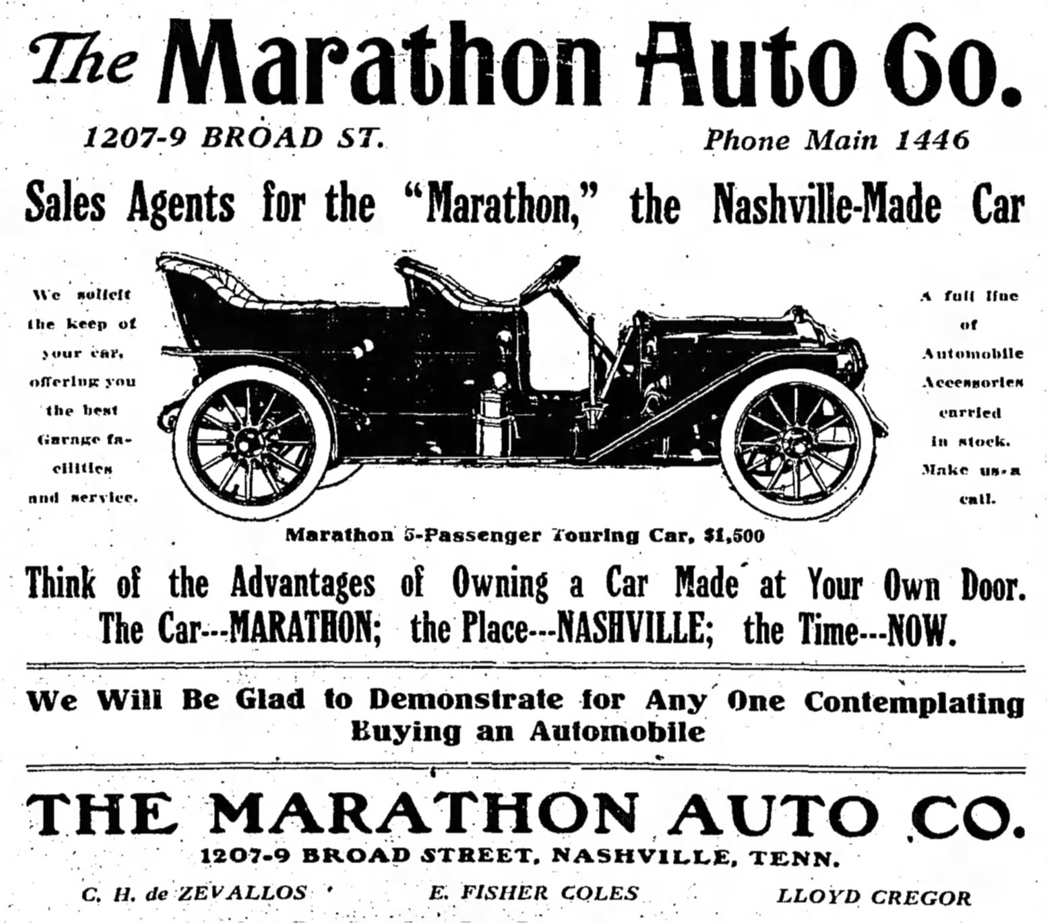
1910 Marathon Advertisement

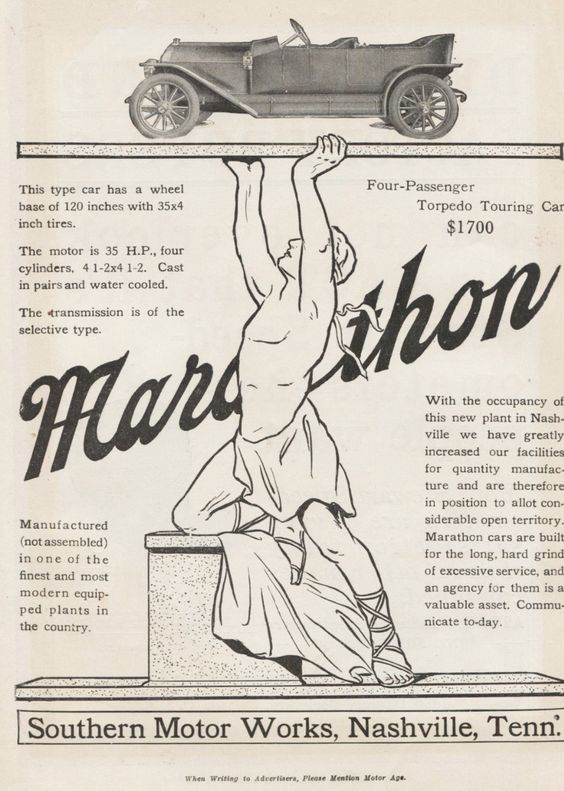
1911 Marathon Advertisement

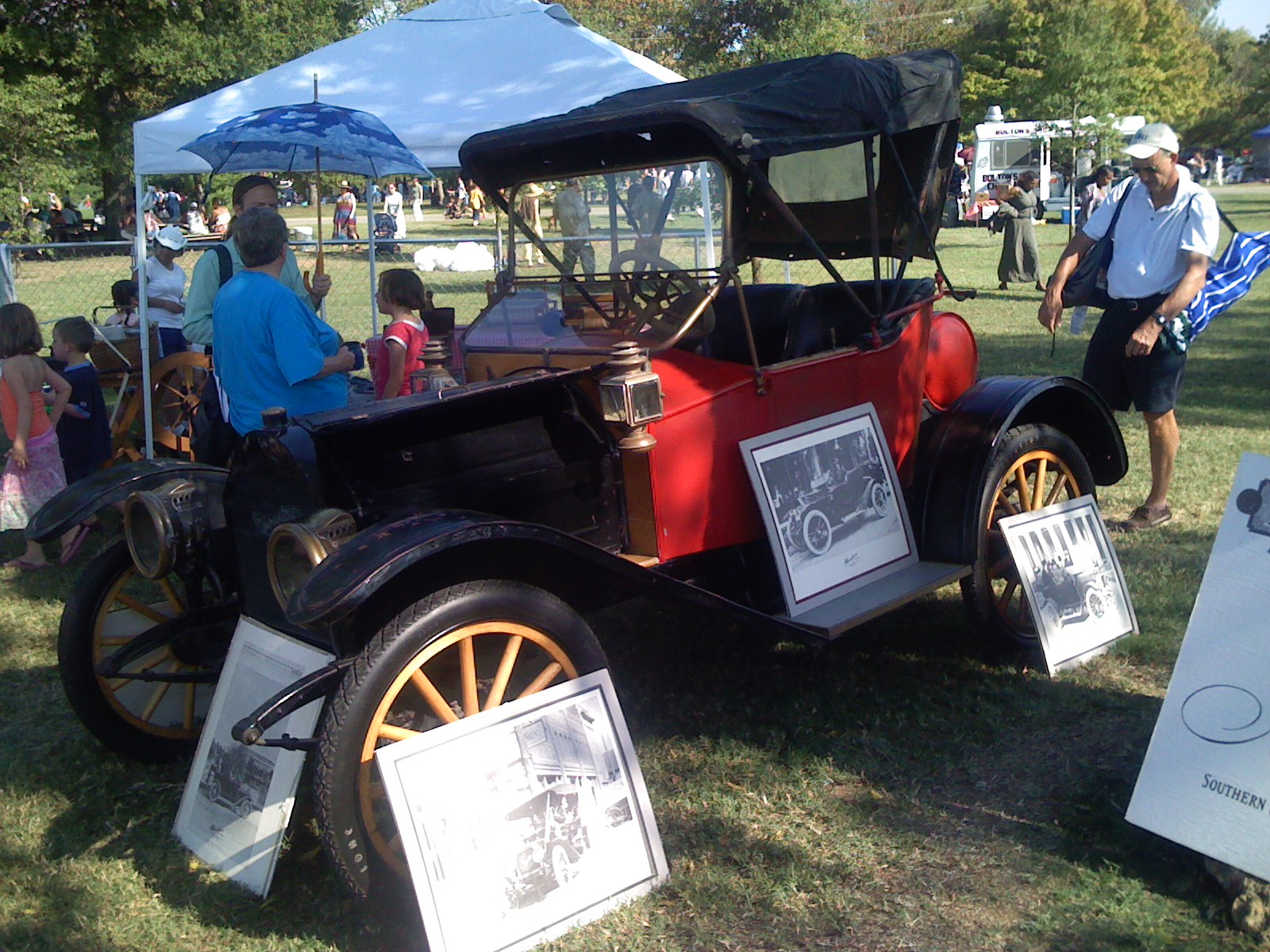
1912 Marathon Model K-20

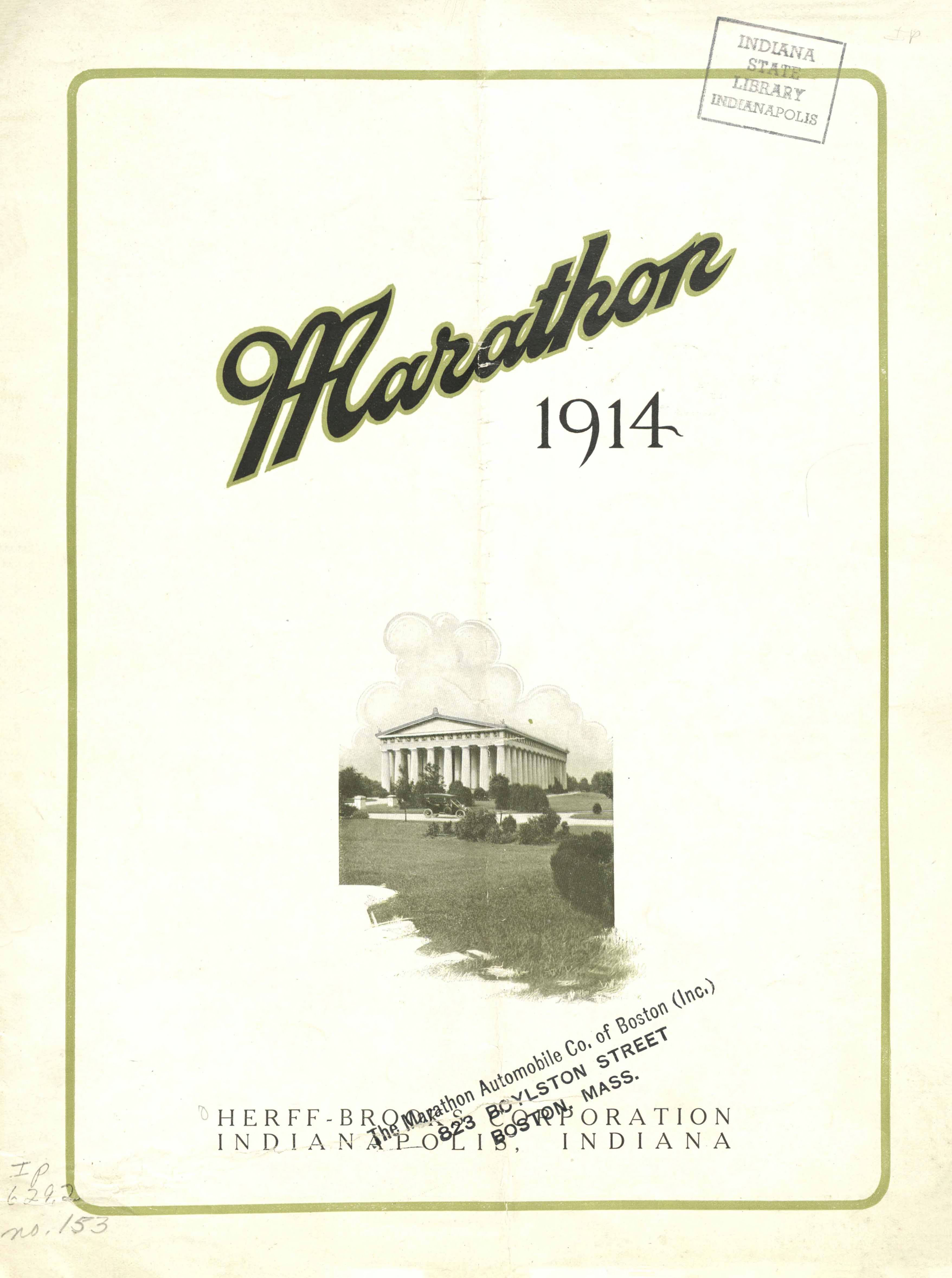
1914 Marathon Brochure Cover

== See also ==
- Marathon Motor Works
- Marathon Music Works
- Herff-Brooks Corporation
