= Maraton (album) =

Music Machine

Studio album by Alina Devecerski
- Released: 19 November 2012
- Genre: Synthpop
- Length: 30:49
- Label: EMI Music Sweden AB

Singles from Maraton
- 1. "Flytta på dej!" Released: April 20, 2012; 2. "Ikväll skiter jag i allt" Released: July 6, 2012; 3. "Jag svär" Released: October 22, 2012; 4. "De e dark nu" Released: January 14, 2013

Maraton is the debut studio album by Swedish singer and songwriter Alina Devecerski. It was released on 19 November 2012. She had huge success with the lead single "Flytta på dej!". The single reached number one in Sweden, Norway and Denmark.

== Track listing ==
Maraton track listing
No.	Title	Writer(s)	Length
1.	"Intro"	Alina Devecerski, Christoffer Wikberg	1:39
2.	"Maraton"	Devecerski, Wikberg	2:27
3.	"Vem tog dig hem"	Devecerski, Wikberg	3:34
4.	"Flytta på dej"	Devecerski, Wikberg	3:27
5.	"Det e dark nu"	Devecerski, Wikberg, Yvonne Kossek	3:41
6.	"Facka ur"	Devecerski, Wikberg	3:59
7.	"Ikväll skiter jag i allt"	Devecerski, Wikberg	2:59
8.	"Jag svär"	Devecerski, Wikberg	2:53
9.	"Ärligt talat"	Devecerski, Wikberg, Joakim Berg	3:03
10.	"Krigar precis som du"	Devecerski, Wikberg, Berg	3:07
Total length:			30:49

== Charts ==
Weekly chart performance for Maraton
Chart (2012)	Peak position
Swedish Albums (Sverigetopplistan)	36
