= Hans Edler =

- Born: 23 March 1945 (age 80)
- Origin: Björkhagen, Stockholm, Sweden
- Genres: Pop, progressive electronic
- Occupation(s): Singer, songwriter, record producer, musician
- Instrument: Vocals
- Years active: 1971–present
- Website: hansedler.com

Hans Edler (born in Björkhagen, Stockholm, Sweden on 23 March 1945) is a Swedish pop musician, record company manager and concert promoter.

Edler came from a musical family. His mother was a music teacher and his grandfather was a folk musician from Jämtland. In the 1960s, he became a teen idol, when he played in the two bands Ghostriders, a pop band influenced by The Shadows, and We 4.

In 1969, he signed for a three-year project Elektroakustisk Musik i Sverige (EMS) in Stockholm led by Knut Wiggen and Gunnel Lundholm. At the same time, he studied mathematics and become a music studio assistant, giving him many opportunities for experimenting with the various technologies available.

His initial studio work appeared on his 1971 album Elektron Kukéso which he released on his own record label, Marilla. The music was created entirely with computers and other electronic equipment at EMS as a mixture of pop, psychedelics and electro-acoustic experiments. On top, Edler added his dark, often mournful songs. Finding critical acclaim and longevity, it has achieved cult status with fans. He has continued his musical career ever since, also managing other artists through his studio. In 2004, he released also Elektron Kukéso on the Boy Wonder Records label. In the 1980s, he had also released a series of disco hit covers entitled Jukebox Graffiti. In 2009, he released Remember the Sixties, carving out a niche as a revivalist from the 1960s.

== Discography ==
=== Albums ===
- 1971: Elektron Kukéso
- 1972: Spökhistorier
- 1975: Dirty Sally
- 1979: Space Vision
- 1979: Disco-Time
- 1980s: Jukebox Graffiti a multi-volume series of hit parade cover albums
- 2004: Elektron Kukéso reissue (with more bonus recordings on Boy Wonder Records])
- 2009: Remember the Sixties (Hans Edler with String Orchestra)

=== Singles ===
- 2010: "Black Fender" (reached #1 on the Swedish Singles Chart)
