= List of Swedish hip-hop musicians =

The following is a list of Swedish hip hop artists:

== Rappers and crews ==
(in alphabetical order)

- 1.Cuz (Swedish)
- Adaam (Swedish)
- Adam Tensta (English)
- Addis Black Widow (English)
- Afasi & Filthy (Swedish)
- Ant Wan (Swedish)
- Bladee (English)
- Cleo (Swedish)
- Dani M (Swedish)
- Dollar Bill (Swedish)
- Dree Low (Swedish)
- Ecco2k (English)
- Einár (Swedish)
- Fronda (Swedish)
- Greekazo (Swedish)
- Hov1 (Swedish)
- Infinite Mass (Swedish)
- Ison & Fille (Swedish)
- Just D (Swedish)
- Kartellen (Swedish)
- Ken Ring (Swedish)
- Kumba
- Labyrint (Swedish)
- Lazee (English)
- Lilla Namo
- Linda Pira (Swedish)
- Looptroop (Swedish, English)
- Mange Schmidt (Swedish)
- Medina (Swedish/Arabic)
- Maskinen (Swedish)
- Mohammed Ali (Swedish)
- Movits! (Swedish)
- Näääk (Swedish/Finnish)
- Newkid (Swedish)
- Papa Dee (English)
- Petter (Swedish)
- Promoe (Swedish)
- Rebstar (English)
- Roffe Ruff (Swedish)
- Silvana Imam (Swedish)
- Snook (Swedish)
- Stonefunkers (Swedish)
- Stor (Swedish)
- Supersci (English)
- Svenska Akademien (Swedish)
- Swingfly (English)
- The Latin Kings (Swedish, Spanish)
- Thomas Rusiak (English, Swedish)
- Timbuktu (Swedish, English)
- VC Barre (Swedish)
- Yasin (Swedish)
- Yung Lean (English)
- Zacke (Swedish)

== DJs ==
- Embee

== Producers ==
- Embee
- Jimmy Ledrac
- Vladi Vargas
- Quincy Jones III (English)
- Ilya
- Yung Gud
- Whitearmor

== See also ==
- Swedish hip hop
- European hip hop
- Music of Sweden
- List of Swedes in music
