= Jireel =

Swedish rapper (born 2000)

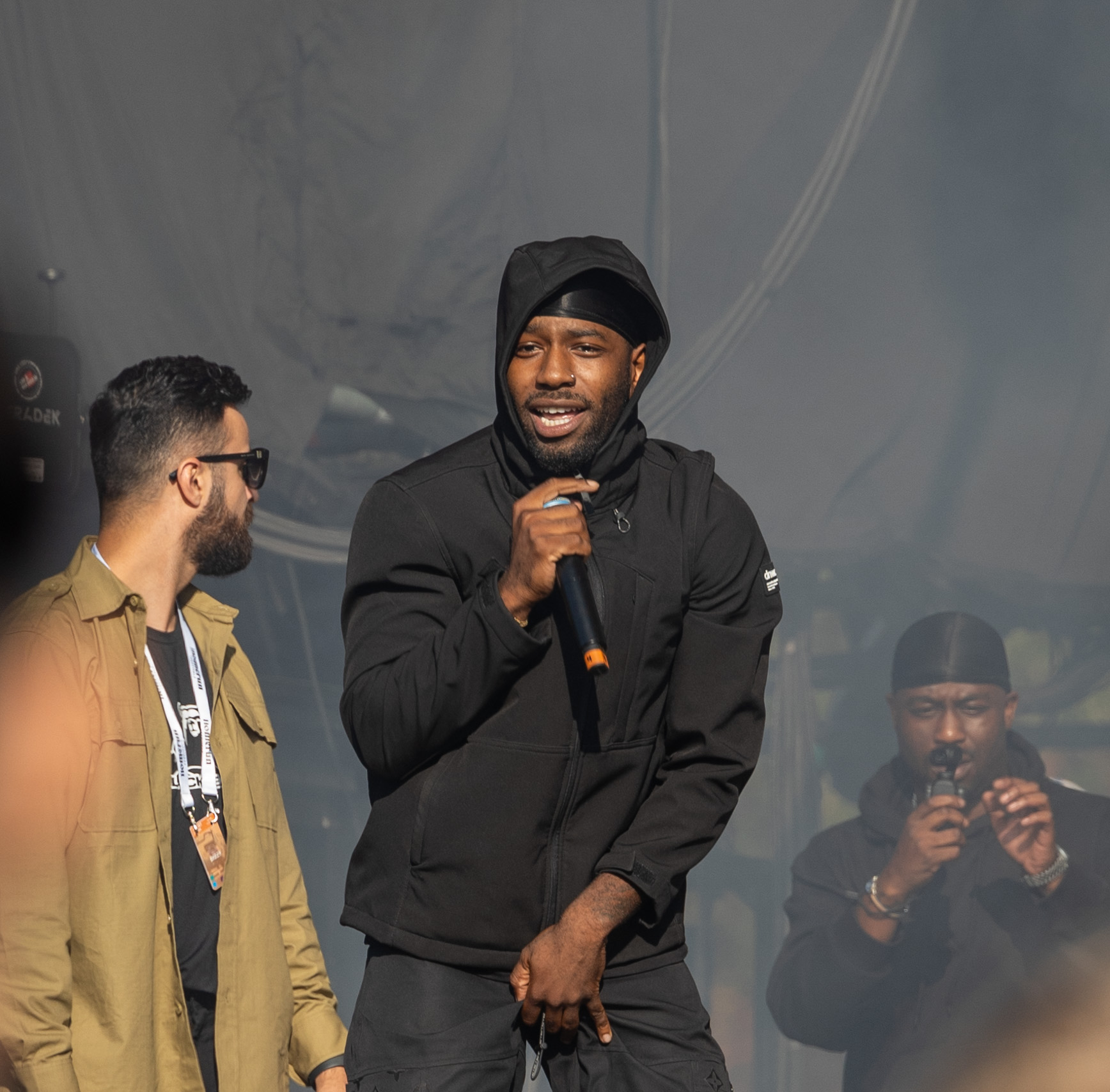
- Jireel performing in 2024

Background information
- Born: Jireel Lavia Pereira; 29 March 2000 (age 26); Luanda, Angola
- Genres: Hip hop, R&B, pop
- Occupations: Rapper, singer, songwriter
- Instrument: Vocals

Jireel Lavia Pereira (born 29 March 2000) is a Swedish rapper and singer best known under his artist name Jireel. In 2017, he released his debut EP Jettad. In 2018, he released his debut studio album, 18, for which he won a Grammis award in the category "Hip Hop/Soul of the Year" in 2019. It was Jireel's second Grammis award, after receiving the award for "New Artist of the Year" in 2018. On 5 June 2020, Jireel released his second studio album, Sex känslor. It contains the previously released singles "För evigt" (featuring Estraden), "Gav allt" (with Victor Leksell and Reyn), "Relationer" and "Chérie". The album peaked at number five on the Swedish Albums Chart. Jireel went to Gubbängsskolan and performed there some years after he left it.

== Discography ==
=== Albums ===
Title	Year	Peak positions	
Title	Year	SWE	NOR
18	2018	13	—
Sex känslor	2020	5	—
1953	2021	3	—
MOTY	2022	2	—
Luanda	2024	7	—
Yemaya	2024	1	—
Yemaya II	2025	4	85

=== Extended plays ===
Title	Year	Peak positions
Title	Year	SWE
Jettad	2017	15
Nitton	2019	10
Eyes Don't Lie	2026	13

=== Singles ===
Title	Year	Peak positions	Certification	Album
Title	Year	SWE	Certification	Album
"Här & nu"	2015	—		Non-album singles
"Som mig"	2016	—		Non-album singles
"Langa luren" (featuring Sam-E)	2016	—		Non-album singles
"Driftig" (with Pato Pooh featuring Denz)	2016	—		Non-album singles
"Cataleya"	2016	36	GLF: 4× Platinum	Jettad
"Snap"	2017	22	GLF: Platinum	Jettad
"Dash" (with Denz and Pato Pooh)	2017	—		Non-album singles
"Waves" (with Pablo Paz, Denz, Pato Pooh, and Lamix)	2017	—		Non-album singles
"Tagga"	2017	89	GLF: Gold	Non-album singles
"Man of the Year"	2017	41	GLF: Gold	18
"Força"	2018	22	GLF: Platinum	18
"Woh" (featuring Lamix)	2018	62		18
"Fast"	2018	54		18
"Peligrosa"	2018	56	GLF: Gold	Non-album single
"Alla mina" (featuring K27)	2019	3	GLF: Platinum	Nitton
"Svårt"	2019	16	GLF: Gold	Nitton
"Hat"	2019	76	GLF: Gold	Nitton
"Wikipedia"	2019	22	GLF: Gold	Non-album single
"Främling" (featuring Ibbe)	2019	36	GLF: Gold	Non-album single
"Alla vet" (with Blacky)	2019	37		Non-album single
"Rusch timmar"	2019	85		Non-album single
"Dröm"	2020	34		Non-album single
"Stora" (with Lamix)	2020	57		Non-album single
"Förklara" (with Stress)	2020	— (Note: "Förklara" did not enter the Swedish Singellista Chart, but peaked at number 10 on the Swedish Heatseeker Chart.)		Playlist 3
"Bags" (with Denz)	2020	—		Non-album single
"För evigt" (featuring Estraden)	2020	10	GLF: Platinum	Sex känslor
"Gav allt" (with Victor Leksell and Reyn)	2020	4	GLF: Platinum	Sex känslor
"Relationer"	2020	46		Sex känslor
"Chérie"	2020	55		Sex känslor
"Den sommaren" (featuring Miriam Bryant)	2020	20		Sex känslor
"Tillsammans" (with BLM STHLM and Gee Dixon featuring Chelsea Muco, Oliviah, Denz, REZ, Seedy, Jamkid and Wintina)	2020	—		Non-album single
"Tankarna"	2020	45		1953
"Förebild"	2020	78		1953
"Reloaded" (with Dennis Doff)	2020	—		Non-album single
"En stund"	2020	99		1953
"Promille" (with Lamix)	2021	83		Non-album singles
"Toute la nuit (Hela natten)" (with Migi)	2021	55		Non-album singles
"Dybala" (remix) (with K27 and Ricky Rich)	2021	49		Non-album singles
"SL"	2021	66		Non-album singles
"Passé"	2021	31		Non-album singles
"Chansa" (with Dani M and Newkid featuring Simon Superti)	2021	—		Non-album singles
"Dagar i regn"	2021	43		Non-album singles
"Better Day" (with Jelassi, Ricky Rich, Mona Masrour and A36)	2021	66		Non-album singles
"Mano"	2022	1		MOTY
"Winner" (featuring A36)	2022	10		MOTY
"Vad e de här?"	2022	26		Non-album singles
"Tar hand om dig"	2022	43		Non-album singles
"Avion"	2022	72		Non-album singles
"Aura"	2023	35		Non-album singles
"Wine"	2023	61		Non-album singles
"Frero"	2023	90		Non-album singles
"Ledare" (with Dizzy)	2023	24		Non-album singles
"Mariachi" (with Dani M)	2023	25		Non-album singles
"Svart Ferrari"	2024	24		Luanda
"Minns du?" (with Thomas Stenström)	2024	32		Luanda
"Amiga"	2024	84		Luanda
"Drömfångare" (with Daniela Rathana)	2024	— (Note: "Drömfångare" did not enter the Swedish Singellista Chart, but peaked at number one on the Swedish Heatseeker Chart.)		Luanda
"Kan jag fråga dig?"	2024	49		Luanda
"Ibiza"	2024	64		Non-album singles
"Tenk inte" (with Roc Boyz)	2024	— (Note: "Tenk inte" did not enter the Swedish Singellista Chart, but peaked at number 11 on the Swedish Heatseeker Chart.)		Non-album singles
"Wow" (with Sondure)	2024	95		Non-album singles
"DNA" (with Y4ska and Romanos)	2024	2		Non-album singles
"Go Shawty"	2024	66		Yemaya
"Santa Catalina"	2024	11		Yemaya
"Leaving" (with Makar)	2025	— (Note: "Leaving" did not enter the Swedish Singellista Chart, but peaked at number one on the Swedish Heatseeker Chart.)		Non-album singles
"Leyla" (with Robin Kadir)	2025	54		Non-album singles
"Love"	2025	12		Non-album singles
"Bad Bunny"	2025	40		Non-album singles
"Baby Kom"	2025	12		Non-album singles
"Gucci Demon" (with Nuqi)	2025	18		Non-album singles
"Genom livet"	2025	63		Yemaya II
"Akwaaba" (with Icekiid)	2025	— (Note: "Akwaaba" did not enter the Swedish Singellista Chart, but peaked at number 9 on the Swedish Heatseeker Chart.)		Yemaya II
"X" (with Reyn)	2025	4		Yemaya II
"Gift"	2026	31		Non-album singles
"Drama"	2026	70		Non-album singles

=== Featured singles ===
Title	Year	Peak positions	Certification	Album
Title	Year	SWE	Certification	Album
"Si ingenting Nivymix" (Kamelen featuring Pato Pooh, Denz, Jireel, and LmFamous)	2016	—		Non-album singles
"Vad du vill" (DJ Black Moose featuring Jireel and Lamix)	2017	—		Non-album singles
"Hey Baby" (remix) (Lamix featuring Mwuana, Jireel, Blizzy, and Elias Abbas)	2017	21	GLF: 3× Platinum	Ingen som hör
"It's a Shutdown Remix" (Yung Fume featuring Jireel)	2017	—		Non-album single
"Trender" (Dani M featuring Jireel)	2017	41		Hela livet
"Pari" (Hov1 featuring Jireel)	2017	1	GLF: 3× Platinum	Gudarna på Västerbron
"Alice" (Seedy featuring Jireel and Denz)	2017	—		Non-album singles
"Wifi" (remix) (Oskar Linnros featuring Jireel and Ana Diaz)	2018	31	GLF: Platinum	Non-album singles
"Je t'aime" (Fricky featuring Jireel)	2018	73	GLF: Gold	Aqua Aura
"Säga mig" (Stor featuring Jireel)	2018	4	GLF: Platinum	Så mycket bättre 2018 – Tolkningarna
"Main Squeeze" (Lamix featuring Jireel)	2019	38		Non-album singles
"Enemies" (S9ine featuring Jireel)	2019	—		Non-album singles
"PLI" (Ibbe featuring Lamix and Jireel)	2019	—		Non-album singles
"Bedöva mig" (Sami featuring Jireel)	2019	—		Ögonstenar
"LeyLey" (F.A.M.E remix) (Dani M, Simon Superti, and Aden x Asme featuring Newkid, Linda Pira, Jireel, and Ricky Rich)	2019	—		Non-album singles
"Dela min tid" (Näääk featuring Jireel)	2019	87		Non-album singles
"Ditt fel" (Miriam Bryant featuring Jireel)	2020	12		Non-album singles
"Som oss" (Seedy featuring Jireel)	2020	—		Non-album singles
"Sanka" (Robin Kadir featuring Jireel, Macky, and A36)	2021	41		Non-album singles

=== Other charted songs ===
Title	Year	Peak chart positions	Album
Title	Year	SWE	Album
"Dör för min" (Newkid featuring Jireel)	2020	77	Mount Jhun
"Va min" (Victor Leksell featuring Jireel and Newkid)	2020	15	Fånga mig när jag faller
"Mexico" (featuring Yasin)	2021	23	1953
"Pain Baby"	2022	— (Note: "Pain Baby" did not enter the Swedish Singellista Chart, but peaked at number one on the Swedish Heatseeker Chart.)	MOTY
"Topp idag"	2022	44	MOTY
"Vem e Jireel"	2022	— (Note: "Vem e Jireel" did not enter the Swedish Singellista Chart, but peaked at number 12 on the Swedish Heatseeker Chart.)	MOTY
"Santorini"	2022	15	MOTY
"Vem e bianca" (featuring Cherrie)	2022	54	MOTY
"Yemaya"	2024	— (Note: "Yemaya" did not enter the Swedish Singellista Chart, but peaked at number six on the Swedish Heatseeker Chart.)	Yemaya
"Armani"	2024	4	Yemaya
"Mamacita"	2024	61	Yemaya
"Under"	2024	— (Note: "Under" did not enter the Swedish Singellista Chart, but peaked at number 11 on the Swedish Heatseeker Chart.)	Yemaya
"Burna Boy" (with Y4ska)	2024	38	Yemaya
"First Kiss"	2025	— (Note: "First Kiss" did not enter the Swedish Singellista Chart, but peaked at number 12 on the Swedish Heatseeker Chart.)	Yemaya II
"25"	2025	55	Yemaya II
"Aje"	2025	— (Note: "Aje" did not enter the Swedish Singellista Chart, but peaked at number 14 on the Swedish Heatseeker Chart.)	Yemaya II
"Faller"	2025	— (Note: "Faller" did not enter the Swedish Singellista Chart, but peaked at number 13 on the Swedish Heatseeker Chart.)	Yemaya II
"Molnigt" (with Nuqi)	2025	— (Note: "Molnigt" did not enter the Swedish Singellista Chart, but peaked at number 6 on the Swedish Heatseeker Chart.)	Yemaya II
"Vai linda" (with Tjuvjakt)	2025	— (Note: "Vai linda" did not enter the Swedish Singellista Chart, but peaked at number 19 on the Swedish Heatseeker Chart.)	Yemaya II
