= Cherrie (singer) =

Swedish R&B singer

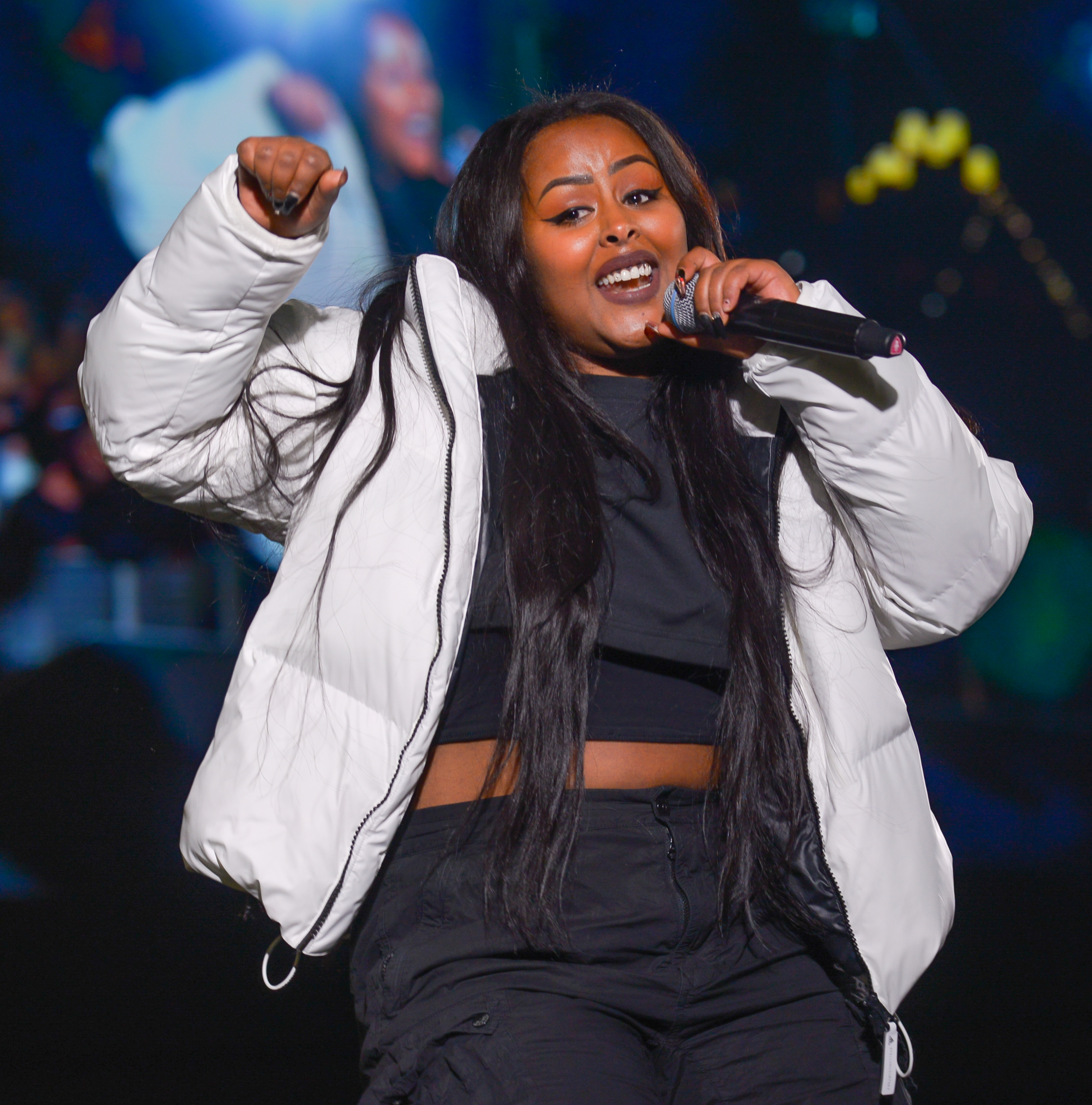
- Cherrie in 2021

Background information
- Born: Shiriihan Mohamed Abdulle; 16 June 1991 (age 35); Oslo, Norway
- Origin: Rinkeby, Stockholm
- Genres: R&B, pop, soul
- Occupations: Singer, songwriter

Shiriihan Mohamed Abdulle (born 16 June 1991), known mononymously as Cherrie, is a Swedish Somali singer. She has released three albums and mixtapes, collaborated with international artists such as Stormzy and Kehlani, and in 2019 a short film was released about her life and rise to stardom. Cherrie was raised in Lohja, Finland, where her parents fled from Somalia. At the age of 10 she and her brother, Kalid Abdulle, moved to Rinkeby in Stockholm together with their mother.

== Biography ==
Cherrie was born in Oslo, Norway but grew up in Lohja in Finland. Her parents had fled from Somalia. At the age of ten, she and her younger brother Kalid Abdulle – better known by his stage name K27 – moved with their mother to Rinkeby in Stockholm. She is also a cousin of the rappers Imenella and Yasin. In 2013, Cherrie appeared in choruses on 24K's music, which was the starting shot for her music career.

The single "Tabanja" was released in 2015 and gained attention. Her debut album Sherihan was released in April 2016, and many of the songs are about Rinkeby where she had previously lived. The album was produced by Leslie Tay and Amr Badr. At the 2016 Grammis, she was nominated for "Newcomer of the Year" and at the 2017 Grammis she was awarded the Grammis for "Hip Hop/Soul of the Year" and was also nominated for "Album of the Year". In 2017, she received the P3 Guld award in the category "Hip Hop/Soul of the Year". In 2019, she was awarded Stockholm city's honorary award. Cherrie has also collaborated with other artists, including featuring on Abidaz's song "En dag".

On July 6, 2017, she was a summer talk show host on Sveriges Radio. On September 29, 2017, she released the single "163 forever" where the rapper Z.E also participates. 163 refers to the postal code for Rinkeby. On February 28, 2018, a remix of the song came out where Kehlani sings a verse in English.

In the spring of 2018, the SVT Edit series Cherrie – Out of the Darkness premiered on SVT Play, a series where Cherrie wants to highlight the people behind the statistics when media reports on shootings. She wants to inspire others with her music and show a way out of the darkness. In the series, viewers follow the artist on tour but also home to Rinkeby. On May 11, 2018, she released the single "It hits me sometimes", which she followed up with her second album Araweelo on June 15 the same year.

Her third album, Naag Nool, was released on June 4, 2021. That year, she was also one of the participants in the entertainment program Så mycket bättre. During the summer of 2022, she participated as an artist in the Kalasturnén.

In 2023, she participated in SVT's entertainment program Songland.

== Discography ==
=== Albums ===
Title	Details	Peak chart positions
Title	Details	SWE
Sherihan	Released: April 2016; Label: Woah Dad! (WOAH118CD); Formats: CD, digital download, streaming	18
Araweelo	Released: June 2018; Label: Araweelo; Formats: digital download, streaming	20
OG (The Mixtape)	Released: May 2019; Label: Araweelo; Formats: digital download, streaming	50
Naag nool	Released: 4 June 2021; Label: Araweelo; Formats: digital download, streaming	17

=== Singles ===
Title	Year	Peak chart positions	Album
Title	Year	SWE	Album
"Ingen annan rör mig som du" (with Leslie Tay)	2015	89	Non-album single
"Inget kommer mellan oss" (featuring Linda Pira)	2015	— (Note: "Inget kommer mellan oss" did not enter the Swedish Singles Chart, but peaked at number two on the Swedish Heatseeker chart.)	Non-album single
"Tabanja"	2015	—	Non-album single
"Aldrig igen (må sådär)" (featuring Stormzy)	2016	70	Sherihan
"Änglar"	2016	—	Non-album single
"Lämna han"	2017	— (Note: "Lämna han" did not enter the Swedish Singles Chart, but peaked at number 17 on the Swedish Heatseeker chart.)	Sherihan
"163 för evigt" (featuring Z.E)	2017	58	Non-album single
"Det slår mig ibland"	2018	— (Note: "Det slår mig ibland" did not enter the Swedish Singles Chart, but peaked at number one on the Swedish Heatseeker chart.)	Araweelo
"Samma flagga"	2018	—	Non-album single
"Kungsliften" (with Fricky)	2018	54	OG (The Mixtape)
"OG"	2019	80	OG (The Mixtape)
"Familjen" (with K27)	2019	93	OG (The Mixtape)
"Auf wiedersehen"	2019	22	Spotify Singles
"Mami"	2019	59	Non-album single
"Mazza"	2019	— (Note: "Mazza" did not enter the Swedish Singellista Chart, but peaked at number 13 on the Swedish Heatseeker Chart.)	Non-album single
"Ingen annan än du"	2020	64	Non-album single
"Maria"	2020	— (Note: "Maria" did not enter the Swedish Singles Chart, but peaked at number five on the Swedish Heatseeker chart.)	Non-album single
"123" (featuring Yasin)	2020	64	Non-album single
"VHS" (with Benjamin Ingrosso)	2021	14	Non-album single
"Mamma är lik sin mamma"	2021	78	Så mycket bättre
"Stockholm i natt"	2021	26	Så mycket bättre
"Röda himlar"	2021	81	Så mycket bättre

=== Featured singles ===
Title	Year	Peak chart positions	Album
Title	Year	SWE	Album
"Vi två" (AMR featuring Cherrie and Keya)	2017	—	Non-album single
"Torka dina tårar" (Stor featuring Cherrie)	2017	— (Note: "Torka dina tårar" did not enter the Swedish Singles Chart, but peaked at number 12 on the Swedish Heatseeker chart.)	Under broarna
"D&G" (Unge Ferrari featuring Cherrie)	2017	—	Non-album single
"Säg till mig" (Pablo Paz featuring Linda Pira and Cherrie)	2017	46	Non-album single
"Andetag" (Erik Lundin featuring Cherrie)	2018	—	Zebrapojken
"Vinnare" (Ison & Fille featuring Cherrie and Imenella)	2019	61	Vackra liv
"Minne blått" (Pato Pooh featuring Cherrie and Simeon)	2019	—	Non-album single
"Tider som dessa" (Guleed featuring Cherrie)	2019	17	50 grader i februari
"Mi amor (Blåmärkshårt)" (Miriam Bryant featuring Cherrie, Molly Sandén and Stor)	2019	5	Mi amor
"Håll om mig" (Sami featuring Cherrie)	2022	— (Note: "Håll om mig" did not enter the Swedish Singellista Chart, but peaked at number 19 on the Swedish Heatseeker Chart.)	Non-album single

=== Other charting songs ===
Title	Year	Peak chart positions	Album
Title	Year	SWE	Album
"Sanningen" (Z.E featuring Cherrie)	2018	— (Note: "Sanningen" did not enter the Swedish Singles Chart, but peaked at number 16 on the Swedish Heatseeker chart.)	Min penna blöder
"Känns som 05'"	2018	— (Note: "Känns som 05'" did not enter the Swedish Singles Chart, but peaked at number 19 on the Swedish Heatseeker chart.)	Araweelo
"Hasta luego" (Dree Low featuring Cherrie)	2020	37	Flawless 2
"Sommardag"	2021	— (Note: "Sommardag" did not enter the Swedish Singellista Chart, but peaked at number 11 on the Swedish Heatseeker Chart.)	Naag nool

== Awards ==
=== Sweden GAFFA Awards ===
Year	Nominee / work	Award	Result	ref.
2019	Herself	Årets Soloartist	Nominated	
