= Fricky =

Swedish rapper and musician (born 1992)

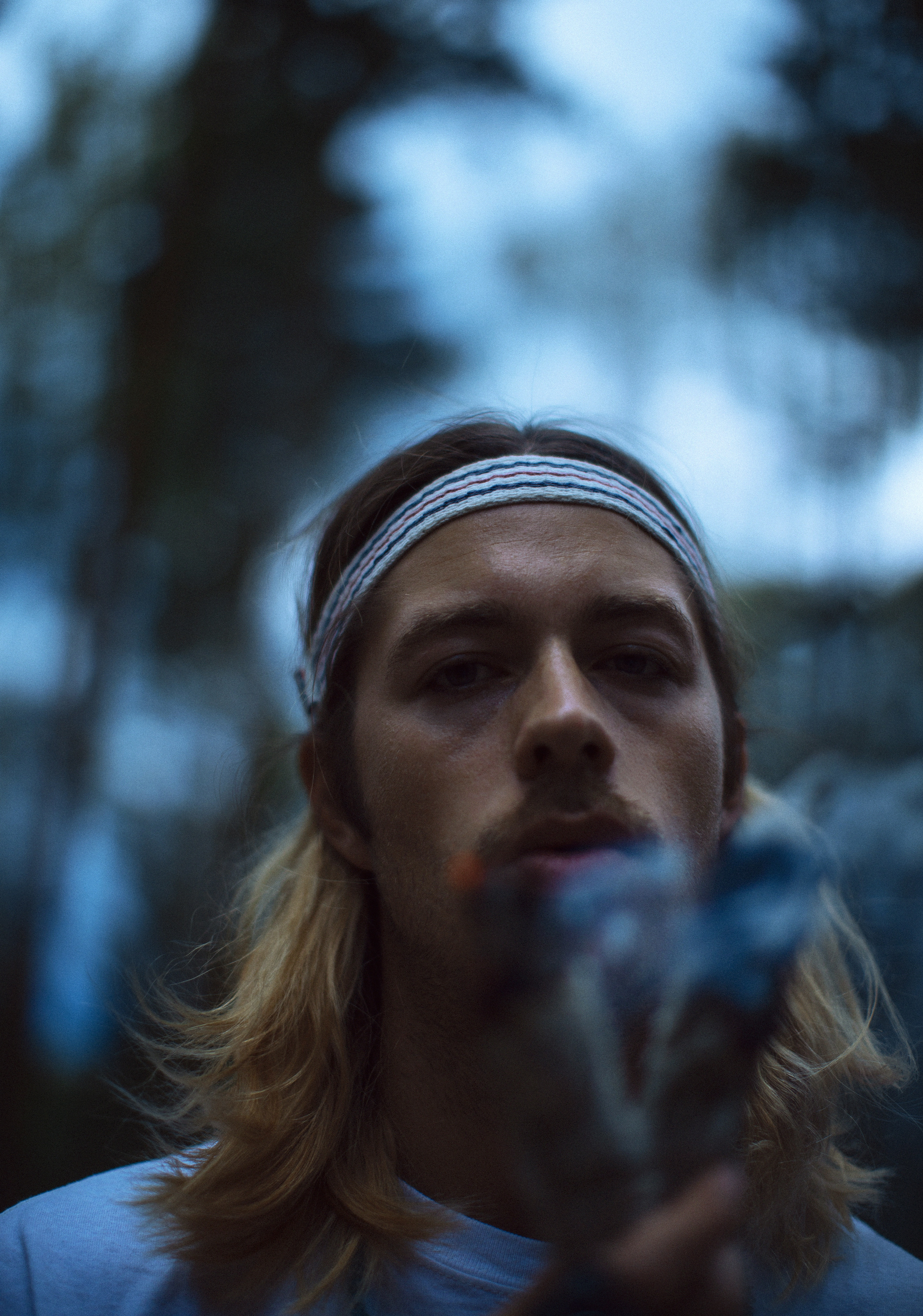
- Fricky in 2019

Background information
- Also known as: Friman
- Born: Carl Erik Friman; 9 March 1992 (age 34); Umeå, Sweden
- Genres: Hip hop; pop; pop rap; R&B
- Occupations: rapper; singer; songwriter
- Label: Random Bastards

Carl Erik Friman, better known by his stage name Fricky (born 9 March 1992), is a Swedish rapper and musician. In 2018, he released his debut EP Aqua Aura, which peaked at number five on the Swedish Albums Chart. The EP contained songs like "Aqua Aura" and "Hon Få Mig", with the first being certified platinum in Sweden. "Hon få mig" was released as a remix, that featured Ozzy, Leslie Tay and Blizzy. It was subsequently certified platinum in Sweden as well.

== Career ==
Fricky started doing hip-hop in his hometown of Umeå (often referred in his music as UÅ) with his friend Johan Bäckström (Broder John) and they made an album together called Mauro, which was released under the name "Broder John & Friman". They also co-founded the record label Hoopdiggas. Friman released the song "Hon få mig" in 2017 which became a hit in Sweden that later paved the way for his EP Aqua Aura, which was released in 2018. Aqua Aura featured songs such as "Mästerort", "Je T'aime" and "Aqua Aura". The latter became one of the most streamed songs on Spotify in Sweden that year. The majority of the songs from the EP were produced by fellow collective artist and close friend Academics. The EP also charted for 82 weeks in Sweden, peaking at number 5 on the Swedish Albums Chart. Subsequently, Fricky was given the award for Artist of the Year from P3 Guld 2019. Fricky released the single "Kungsliften", featuring Cherrie, in 2018. The song peaked at number 54 on the Swedish Singles Chart. He has also been featured on numerous tracks; "Cali" (with Näääk and Denz), "Flyger Högt" (by BENNETT) and "Chocolate" (by K27). "Cali" peaked at number 18 on the Swedish Singles Chart. He has released three solo singles in 2020, "Beemer" and "Axlar", with the first peaking at number 41 on the Swedish Singles Chart. "Axlar" charted on the Swedish Heatseeker Chart, where it peaked at number six. The third single, "Kär Pt. 2", was released on 10 July. It marks the follow-up to Fricky's single "Kär Pt. 1", released in 2016.

== Personal life ==
Friman is married to Swedish rapper Cleo, who gave birth to their daughter Elda in early 2019.

== Discography ==
Adapted from Spotify.

=== Studio albums ===
- Fricktion (2021) – No. 7 Sweden
- Horizon Inn (2023) – No. 27 Sweden

=== Extended plays ===
Title	Details	Peak chart positions
Title	Details	SWE
Aqua Aura	Released: 23 March 2018; Label: Random Bastards; Formats: Digital download, streaming	5 (Note: The EP also charted at number 12 on the Swedish Year-end album chart in 2018.)

=== Singles ===
Title	Year	Peak chart positions	Certification	Album/EP
Title	Year	SWE	Certification	Album/EP
"Kär Pt.1"	2016	—		Non-album single
"Hon få mig"	2017	—		Aqua Aura
"Man" (featuring Academics)	2018	— (Note: "Man" did not enter the Swedish Singles Chart, but peaked at number 12 on the Swedish Heatseeker chart.)		Aqua Aura
"Hon få mig - Remix" (featuring Ozzy, Leslie Tay and Blizzy)	2018	52	GLF: Platinum	Non-album single
"Aqua Aura"	2018	24	GLF: Platinum	Aqua Aura
"Kungsliften" (featuring Cherrie)	2018	54		Non-album singles
"Beemer"	2020	41		Non-album singles
"Axlar"	2020	— (Note: While "Axlar" did not enter the Swedish Singles Chart, it peaked at number 6 on the Swedish Heatseeker Chart.)		Non-album singles
"Tanka tänka"	2021	81		Fricktion
"Moonshine"	2021	— (Note: "Moonshine" did not enter the Swedish Singellista Chart, but peaked at number five on the Swedish Heatseeker Chart.)		Fricktion
"Nattbuss"	2023	66		Non-album single

=== Other charted songs ===
Title	Year	Peak chart positions	EP
Title	Year	SWE	EP
"Je t'aime" (featuring Jireel)	2018	73	Aqua Aura
"Hopper" (with 1.Cuz)	2021	80	Fricktion
"Fricktion"	2021	— (Note: "Fricktion" did not enter the Swedish Singellista Chart, but peaked at number four on the Swedish Heatseeker Chart.)	Fricktion

=== Featured singles ===
Title	Year	Peak chart positions	Album
Title	Year	SWE	Album
"Cali" (Näääk featuring Fricky, Denz)	2019	18	Non-album single
"Flyger Högt" (Bennett featuring Fricky)	2020	—	Och du heter?
"Chocolate" (K27 featuring Fricky)	2020	38	99 Overall
