= JBS =

JBS may refer to:

== Schools ==
- John Burroughs School, in Ladue, Missouri, United States
- Judge Business School, at Cambridge University
- June Buchanan School, in Pippa Passes, Kentucky, United States
- John Bosco School, former name of De La Salle John Bosco College
- JBS, an abbreviation for Lycée Jean-Baptiste-Say (JBS Lyceum), Paris

== Groups, organizations, companies ==
- Japan Bible Society
- JBS S.A., a Brazilian meat processor operating worldwide
  - JBS Foods International, International subsidiary of JBS
  - JBS USA, its U.S. subsidiary
- Jewish Broadcasting Service, an American broadcaster
- Johanson–Blizzard syndrome
- John Birch Society

== Other uses ==
- Jubilee Bus Station, in Secunderabad, Telangana, India
- John Bendor-Samuel (1929–2011), a British missionary linguist
- Journal of British Studies
- Journal of Burma Studies
- Journey Beyond Sodor, a 2017 Thomas & Friends film
- JBS (singer), German singer and songwriter

== See also ==
- JB (disambiguation)
- JB's (disambiguation)
