= 1.Cuz =

Swedish rapper (born 1997)

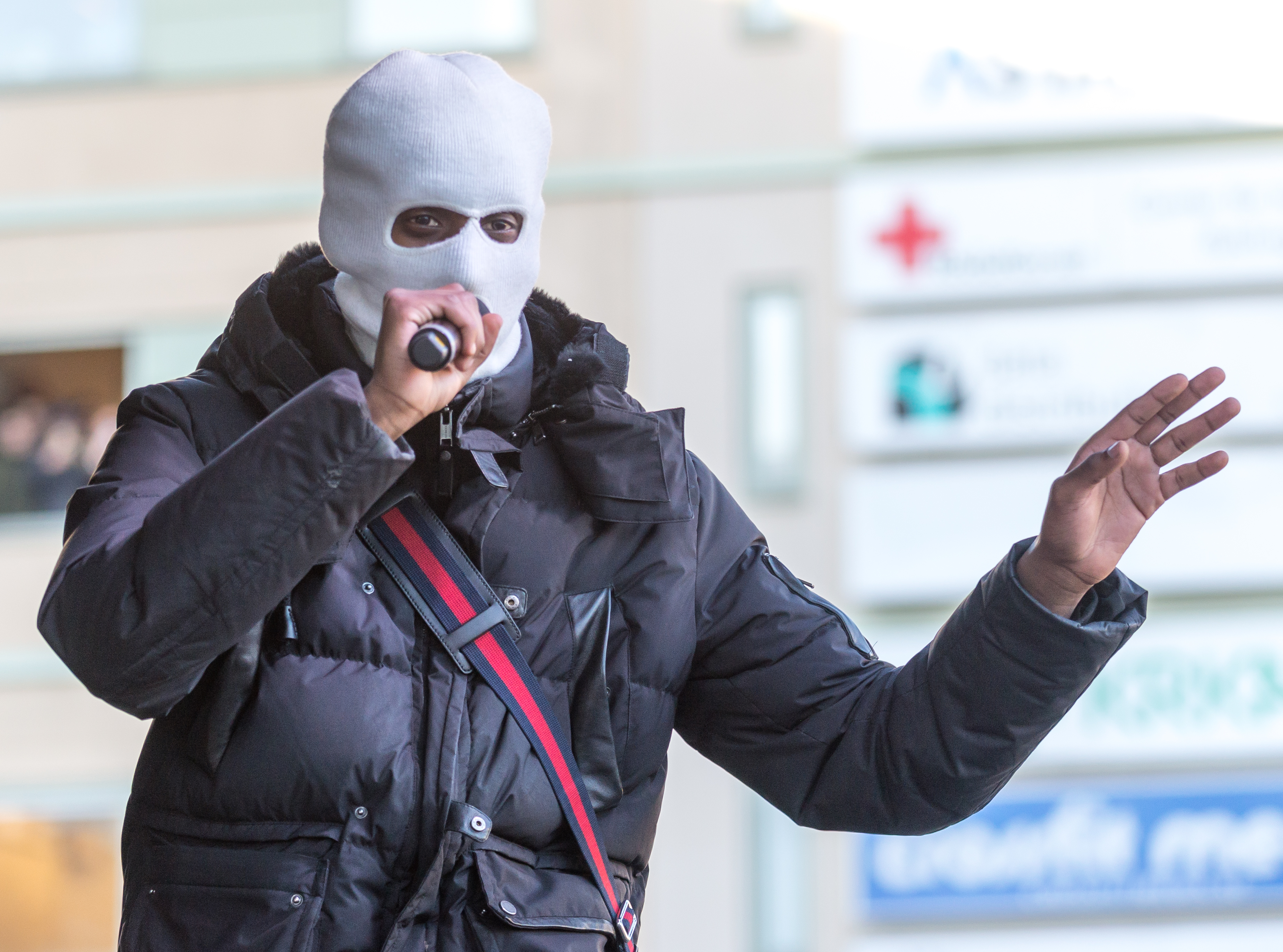
- 1.Cuz in February 2020

Background information
- Born: Abas Abdikarim Bakar; 23 September 1997 (age 29); Jönköping, Sweden
- Origin: Hässelby, Stockholm, Sweden
- Genre: Hip hop
- Occupations: Rapper
- Years active: 2018–2026

Abas Abdikarim Bakar, better known as 1.Cuz (born September 23, 1997), is a Swedish rapper of Somali heritage from Hässelby, Stockholm. He is known for performing with a white balaclava covering his head.

1.Cuz spent two years in prison, an experience that he later said influenced his musical career. In November 2018, he released his debut single "Akta mannen", and in December 2019, his studio album 1 År reached the top of the Swedish Albums Chart. In 2022, 1.Cuz was featured on a remix of Ed Sheeran's song "2step", and the two later performed together at the Ullevi stadium. In August 2025, Ed Sheeran was the secret guest when 1.Cuz played at Gröna Lund performing "2step" with him.

== Community engagement and business activities ==
Among other things, Bakar has collaborated with activist Greta Thunberg; for example, to call for vaccination against COVID-19. Bakar has also become involved in the climate issue by performing at Fridays for Future's events in 2020 and 2022. Bakar runs the company Pro Mr Investment AB for his activities as an artist.

== Discography ==
=== Albums ===
Title	Year	Peak chart positions
Title	Year	SWE
1 år	2019	1
FFF	2020	6

=== EPs ===
Title	Year	Peak chart positions
Title	Year	SWE
Tre hjärnor	2019	13

=== Singles ===
Title	Year	Peak chart positions	Album
Title	Year	SWE	Album
"Akta mannen"	2018	90	Tre hjärnor
"Swedens Most Wanted"	2019	19	Tre hjärnor
"Beef" (with Denz and Dree Low)	2019	40	Non-album singles
"Livet vi lever" (with Asme)	2019	31	Non-album singles
"Ja e Somali" (with Hasta B)	2019	69	Non-album singles
"Akta mannen" (remix) (with Dree Low and Einár)	2019	20	Tre hjärnor
"1kta" (featuring Aden)	2019	40	Non-album single
"Försent" (with Greekazo and Yei Gonzalez)	2019	2	1 år
"1 mill" (with Gidde and Asme)	2019	34	Non-album single
"Mr" (with Luk G featuring Yei Gonzalez)	2019	46	1 år
"Tipp tapp" (with Stress and Dree Low)	2020	21	Playlist 3
"Posten försvann"	2020	40	Non-album singles
"Harry Potter"	2020	47	Non-album singles
"Netfl1x" (with 4yye)	2020	84	Non-album singles
"Fiendes fiende" (with Einár)	2020	11	FFF
"Shahwah" (with Luk G featuring Yei Gonzalez)	2020	—	Non-album single
"Förmögen"	2020	55	FFF
"Siktar högre" (with 4yye and Asme)	2020	— (Note: "Siktar högre" did not enter the Swedish Singles Chart, but peaked at number three on the Swedish Heatseeker chart.)	Antisocial
"En går bort (Oh Why)"	2020	—	Non-album singles
"Salsa" (with Yei Gonzalez and ODZ)	2020	16	Non-album singles
"Ghosts" (with Euroo)	2020	— (Note: "Ghosts" did not enter the Swedish Singles Chart, but peaked at number ten on the Swedish Heatseeker chart.)	Non-album singles
"Exclusive" (with Mona Masrour)	2020	—	Non-album singles
"Demons"	2021	— (Note: "Demons" did not enter the Swedish Singles Chart, but peaked at number 20 on the Swedish Heatseeker chart.)	Non-album singles
"Hotbox" (with Euroo)	2021	— (Note: "Hotbox" did not enter the Swedish Singles Chart, but peaked at number 17 on the Swedish Heatseeker chart.)	Non-album singles
"Caravaggio"	2021	9	Non-album singles
"Skadad"	2021	62	Non-album singles
"2022"	2022	95	Non-album singles
"Back 2 Back"	2022	97	Non-album singles
"Hit" (solo or remix with Devito)	2022	50	Non-album singles
"Police"	2022	32	Non-album singles
"ANC (Ain't No Cap)" (with DNoteOnDaBeat)	2022	96	Non-album singles
"Sticky Situation" (with Sticky and 01an)	2023	43	Non-album singles
"Bottega"	2023	73	Non-album singles
"Stilo"	2023	— (Note: "Stilo" did not enter the Swedish Singellista Chart, but peaked at number two on the Swedish Heatseeker Chart.)	Non-album singles
"Trauma Paranoia" (with 01an)	2023	61	Non-album singles
"Bad Bunny" (with 01an)	2024	— (Note: "Bad Bunny" did not enter the Swedish Singellista Chart, but peaked at number two on the Swedish Heatseeker Chart.)	Non-album singles
"Feeling" (with VC Barre)	2024	61	Non-album singles
"Ingen vila"	2024	91	Non-album singles
"Gå vidare"	2024	— (Note: "Gå vidare" did not enter the Swedish Singellista Chart, but peaked at number 11 on the Swedish Heatseeker Chart.)	Non-album singles
"Här ute" (with 01an)	2025	64	Non-album singles

=== Featured singles ===
Title	Year	Peak chart positions	Album
Title	Year	SWE	Album
"Ingen mening" (Wild-Boy featuring 1.Cuz)	2019	— (Note: "Ingen mening" did not enter the Swedish Singles Chart, but peaked at number four on the Swedish Heatseeker chart.)	Non-album singles
"Va som mig" (Samir & Viktor featuring 1.Cuz)	2019	48	Non-album singles
"Hype" (E4an featuring 1.Cuz)	2020	81	Non-album singles
"2step" (Ed Sheeran featuring 1.Cuz)	2022	1	Non-album singles
"Trakten till epan" (Rasmus Gozzi and Fröken Snusk featuring 1.Cuz)	2023	5	Non-album singles

=== Other charted songs ===
Title	Year	Peak chart positions	Album
Title	Year	SWE	Album
"Out of My Face" (Dree Low featuring 1.Cuz)	2019	70	No hasta mañana 2
"Tre hjärnor"	2019	55	Tre hjärnor
"Sirener"	2019	96	Tre hjärnor
"Till mig" (Dree Low featuring 1.Cuz and Aden x Asme)	2019	45	Flawless
"Räkna mina dagar" (featuring Einár and Yei Gonzalez)	2019	9	1 år
"Bilen" (featuring Dree Low and Yei Gonzalez)	2019	56	1 år
"Ha Ha Ha"	2019	— (Note: "Ha Ha Ha" did not enter the Swedish Singles Chart, but peaked at number two on the Swedish Heatseeker chart.)	1 år
"Rolling Stones"	2019	— (Note: "Rolling Stones" did not enter the Swedish Singles Chart, but peaked at number three on the Swedish Heatseeker chart.)	1 år
"Försent 2" (with Yei Gonzalez, Greekazo, and DnoteOnDaBeat)	2020	97	Gör nu, tänk sen
"I jakt på kaniner" (featuring Yasin)	2020	54	FFF
"Punkigt"	2020	— (Note: "Punkigt" did not enter the Swedish Singles Chart, but peaked at number ten on the Swedish Heatseeker chart.)	FFF
"Hopper" (with Fricky)	2021	80	Fricktion
"Kaxig" (with Asme)	2023	62	Spår av blod
