= Miriam Bryant =

Swedish singer and songwriter

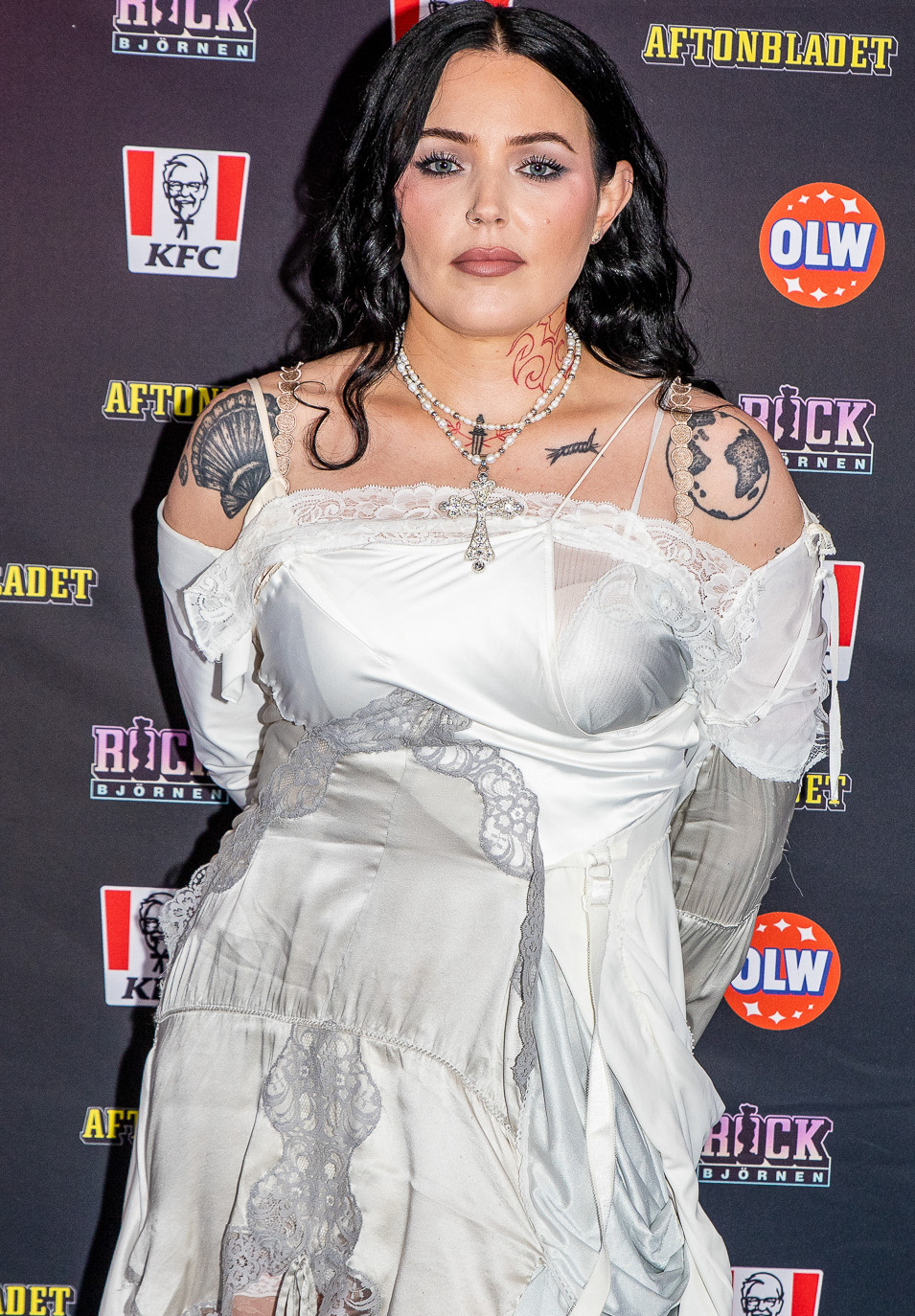
- Bryant in 2024

Background information
- Born: Miriam Melanie Bryant; 8 March 1991 (age 35); Gothenburg, Sweden
- Genres: Pop; soul
- Occupations: Singer; songwriter
- Instrument: Vocals
- Years active: 2011–present
- Labels: Warner Sweden; Interscope; Cherrytree
- Website: miriambryantofficial.com

Miriam Melanie Bryant (born 8 March 1991) is a Swedish singer and songwriter. On 14 February 2016, she became the first act to simultaneously hold the top three entries on the Svensktoppen weekly record chart since its original release on 13 October 1962.

== Biography ==
Bryant was born in Gothenburg, Sweden to a British father and a Finnish mother. She attended Finnish school there and also spent time in Finland, in her mother's hometown of Iisalmi. According to Bryant, during her childhood, people of Finnish background were looked down upon in Sweden, which is why she highlighted her English side as a child.

She began to write songs in 2011 together with her childhood friend, Victor Rådström who is a producer and songwriter. Four months later, she produced three songs released in her single debut "Finders, Keepers" in March 2012 through the record label 100 songs. The song received worldwide attention among bloggers and music sites. She is signed to Warner Music in Sweden and to Interscope Records in the United States.

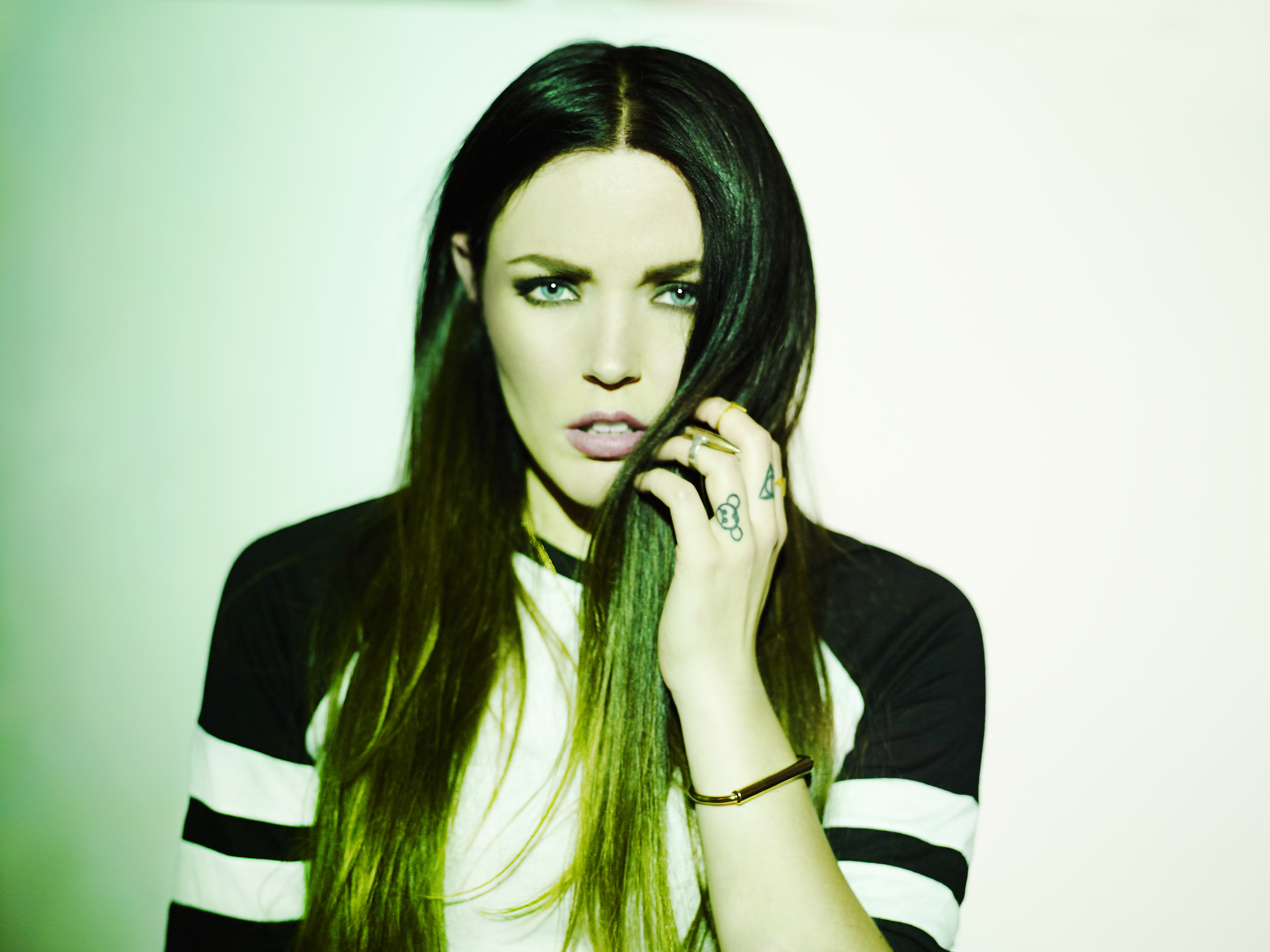
Miriam Bryant in 2014

She has collaborated with music producer and DJ Zedd, who first heard her on the German radio. Zedd made a remix of her song "Push Play" on his re-released album.

Bryant released her Push Play EP on 8 October 2013 through Interscope Records, her debut release in the United States. In 2015, Bryant was one of eight artists being involved in the programme Så mycket bättre on the Swedish commercial channel TV4. After that, her popularity grew quickly.

The single "Black Car" became a hit in homeland Sweden, winning Song of the Year in 2016. In 2017, Bryant was nominated for Best Live Act on the Swedish Grammis. In 2018, British press wrote the following about her single—Clash magazine wrote "Highly Intelligent and completely infectious", and The Line of Best Fit wrote "Miriam Bryant is your next pop superhero". In 2018, she played at Roskilde Festival and The Great Escape Festival, to name a few.

In December 2019, she hosted the TV and radio fundraising project Musikhjälpen in Västerås together with Daniel Hallberg and Farah Abadi.

PS jag hatar dig (2021) was Bryant's first Swedish-language studio album; on the previous two she had sung in English. In 2024 she released her first Finnish-language single "Mustelmilla (Mi Amor)". Later that year, she was a guest at the reception for Finland's Independence Day.

== Discography ==
=== Studio albums ===
Year	Title	Peak positions	Certifications
Year	Title	SWE	Certifications
2013	Raised in Rain	12	
2017	Bye Bye Blue	5	GLF: Gold
2021	PS jag hatar dig	6	
2025	Okej att dö	4	

=== Extended plays ===
Year	Title	Peak positions
Year	Title	SWE
2013	Push Play	—
2015	I Am Dragon	18
2016	Hisingen och hem igen	2
2019	Mi amor	15

=== Singles ===
==== As lead artist ====
List of singles as lead artist, with selected chart positions and certifications, showing year released and album name
Title	Year	Peak positions				Certifications	Album
Title	Year	SWE	AUT	GER	NOR	Certifications	Album
"Finders, Keepers"	2012	—	51	46	—	GLF: Gold	Raised in Rain
"Raised in Rain"	2012	—	—	—	—		Raised in Rain
"Push Play"	2013	12	—	—	—	GLF: 2× Platinum	Raised in Rain
"Last Soul on Earth"	2013	—	—	—	—		Raised in Rain
"Dragon"	2014	29	—	—	—	GLF: Platinum	I Am Dragon
"Black Car"	2016	2	—	—	—	GLF: 4× Platinum	Bye Bye Blue
"Everything"	2017	16	—	—	—		Bye Bye Blue
"Rocket" (featuring Neiked)	2017	21	—	—	—		Bye Bye Blue
"Words"	2017	60	—	—	—		Bye Bye Blue
"O A O A E vi förlorade" (with Markus Krunegård)	2018	—	—	—	—	GLF: Gold	I huvet på en idiot, i en bar, på en ö, i ett hav, på en ö, i en bar, i huvet på en idiot
"Du med dig"	2019	42	—	—	—	GLF: Platinum	Mi amor
"Neråt / Uppåt"	2019	55	—	—	—	GLF: Gold	Mi amor
"Blåmärkshårt (Mi amor)" (solo or with Cherrie, Molly Sandén and Stor)	2019	5	—	—	—	GLF: Platinum	Mi amor
"Du med dig" (acoustic)	2019	— (Note: "Du med dig" (acoustic) did not enter the Swedish Singellista Chart, but peaked at number 18 on the Swedish Heatseeker Chart.)	—	—	—	GLF: Platinum	Non-album single
"Nån av oss"	2020	18	—	—	—	GLF: 2× Platinum	PS jag hatar dig
"Passa dig"	2020	21	—	—	—		PS jag hatar dig
"Ditt fel" (with Jireel)	2020	12	—	—	—	GLF: Platinum	PS jag hatar dig
"Ge upp igen" (with Yasin)	2020	1	—	—	—		Non-album single
"Tystnar i luren" (with Victor Leksell)	2021	1	—	—	—	GLF: 5× Platinum	PS jag hatar dig
"Mitt hjärta blöder"	2021	6	—	—	—		Satan i gatan 10 år
"Lonely in a Crowd" (featuring Joakim Berg)	2021	16	—	—	—		PS jag hatar dig
"Rosor från en loser"	2021	— (Note: "Rosor från en loser" did not enter the Swedish Singellista Chart, but peaked at number two on the Swedish Heatseeker Chart.)	—	—			PS jag hatar dig
"VinterNoll2"	2021	—	—	—	—		Non-album single
"Gubben i lådan" (with Thomas Stenström)	2021	47	—	—	—		Så mycket bättre
"Gråter om du vill" (with Thomas Stenström)	2022	2	—	—	—		Non-album single
"Under någon ny" (with Veronica Maggio)	2023	4	—	—	—		Okej att dö
"Sarkofag"	2023	39	—	—	—		Non-album single
"Vem fan e du?" (with Hooja)	2024	1	—	—	—	GLF: 2× Platinum	TBA
"Okej att dö"	2024	32	—	—	—		Okej att dö
"Dum"	2024	26	—	—	—		Okej att dö
"Regnblöta skor"	2024	1	—	—	—		Okej att dö
"In kom en ängel"	2024	47	—	—	—		Okej att dö
"Halleluja"	2025	31	—	—	—		Okej att dö
"Nothing 4-Ever"	2025	45	—	—	—		Okej att dö
"So Cool" (with Highasakite)	2025	— (Note: "So Cool" did not enter the Swedish Singellista Chart, but peaked at number seven on the Swedish Heatseeker Chart.)	—	—	39		Non-album single
"FaceTime"	2025	40	—	—	—		Okej att dö
"Der du brente vår bro" (with Ruben)	2026	—	—	—	45		Non-album singles
"Superlim & silvertejp" (with Molly Sandén)	2026	10	—	—	—		Non-album singles
"Higher Calling" (with Stor)	2026	— (Note: "Higher Calling" did not enter the Swedish Singellista Chart, but peaked at number 3 on the Swedish Heatseeker Chart.)	—	—	—		Non-album singles
"—" denotes releases that did not chart or were not released in that territory.

==== As featured artist ====
List of singles as featured artist, with selected chart positions and certifications, showing year released and album name
Title	Year	Peak positions							Certifications	Album
Title	Year	SWE	FIN	AUS	BEL (FL) Tip	KOR Int.	US Bubbling	US Dance	Certifications	Album
"Push Play" (Zedd featuring Miriam Bryant)	2013	—	—	—	—	—	—	—		Clarity
"Find You" (Zedd featuring Matthew Koma and Miriam Bryant)	2014	—	—	68	34	61	1	1	GLF: Gold; ARIA: Gold; RIAA: Gold	Divergent
"How Did I Find You" (Neiked featuring Miriam Bryant)	2018	— (Note: "How Did I Find You" did not enter the Sverigetopplistan, but peaked at number one on the Swedish Heatseeker chart.)	—	—	—	—	—	—		Best of Hard Drive
"Den sommaren" (Jireel featuring Miriam Bryant)	2020	20	—	—	—	—	—	—		Sex känslor
"Avundsjuk på regnet" (Daniel Adams-Ray featuring Miriam Bryant)	2020	33	—	—	—	—	—	—	GLF: Gold	Döda hjärtan kan slå igen
"Otan kii" (Isac Elliot featuring Miriam Bryant)	2024	—	3	—	—	—	—	—		Vanhasta uuteen
"—" denotes releases that did not chart or were not released in that territory.

=== Other charted songs ===
Title	Year	Peak positions	Certifications	Album
Title	Year	SWE	Certifications	Album
"One Last Time"	2015	4	GLF: 3× Platinum	Hisingen och hem igen
"Ett sista glas"	2015	4	GLF: 5× Platinum	Hisingen och hem igen
"Life Is a Flower"	2015	11	GLF: 2× Platinum	Hisingen och hem igen
"Stationen"	2015	6	GLF: 2× Platinum	Hisingen och hem igen
"The Only One"	2015	15	GLF: Gold	Hisingen och hem igen
"Allt jag behöver"	2015	2	GLF: 4× Platinum	Hisingen och hem igen
"Serendipity"	2015	— (Note: "Serendipity" did not enter the Swedish Singles Chart, but peaked at number seven on the Swedish Heatseekers chart.)		I Am Dragon
"Game"	2016	97		"Black Car" single
"PS jag hatar dig"	2021	24		PS jag hatar dig
"—" denotes releases that did not chart or were not released in that territory.
