= JB =

JB or J.B. may refer to:

== People ==
- JB (Canadian rapper)
- JB (Swedish musician)
- BlocBoy JB (born 1996), American rapper
- Jay B (born 1994), South Korean singer
- Jack Black (born 1969), American actor and comedian
- Jaffar Byn, Swedish rapper
- JB Pritzker, (born 1965), Governor of Illinois
- J. B. Smoove (born 1965), American actor and comedian
- Jude Bellingham (born 2003), English footballer

== Publications ==
- J.B. (play), 1958, by Archibald MacLeish
- JB Catalogue of Malta Stamps and Postal History
- Jerusalem Bible, a 1966 Catholic translation of the Bible
- Jornal do Brasil, a newspaper

== Transport ==
- British Rail Class 73 locomotives
- Jungfraubahn, a rack railway in Switzerland
- Helijet, a Canadian helicopter airline (IATA:JB)
- , local train services on Japan's Chūō–Sōbu Line

== Other uses ==
- Johor Bahru, a city in Malaysia
- J&B RARE Whisky, by Justerini & Brooks
- JB Hi-Fi, Australian electronics store
- Junior branch, of children's charity CISV International

== See also ==
- JB's (disambiguation)
