= Supersci =

Swedish hip hop group

- Origin: Sundsvall, Sweden
- Genres: Hip hop
- Years active: 1997–present
- Labels: Flyphonic Phonogram
- Members: Arka; Mr. Noun; Erik L DJ Observe; Remedeeh
- Website: Official website

Supersci, formerly Superscientifiku, is a Swedish hip hop group, composed of rapper Mr. Noun, rapper/producer Arka, rapper/singer Remedeeh, multi-instrumentalist/producer Erik L and DJ Observe. They hail from Sundsvall, Sweden. Arka and Erik L are also from the production team Flyphonic. Their debut EP, Soundvalley, was released in 1998. Their second album, Timelines, was nominated to receive the P3 Guld award for "Hiphop of the Year" in 2011.

== Discography ==
Studio albums

- Pinetrees on the Pavement (2006)
- Timelines (2010)
- Entropy (2015)

Singles and EPs

- Soundvalley EP (1998)
- Syntax + Semantics EP (1999)
- Aahyeahwhatchasay EP (2001)
- How We Gonna Fail Now? EP (2002)
- What It Is EP (2009)

Mixtapes

- Cutting Down Trees (2007)

== See also ==
- Swedish hip hop
