= Roffe Ruff =

Swedish hip hop and ragga artist

- Also known as: Roffe the Ruffler
- Origin: Gothenburg, Sweden
- Genres: Hip hop, ragga/dancehall, reggae
- Occupations: Singer, songwriter, record producer
- Years active: 2009 -
- Labels: Stiladig; Olofsson Management

Roffe Ruff is a Swedish hip hop and ragga artist and music producer from Gothenburg. His real identity remains a secret, and he always wears a skull mask in his appearances.

== Biography ==
Roffe Ruff was raised in Majorna, the district in Gothenburg that receives most performing royalties from STIM—the Swedish collecting society. He played in his first band at the age of twelve, and recorded rap songs on a DAT recorder together with a friend when he was seventeen. They made a go for it in the music business three years later and Roffe loved the feeling to be on stage, but hated the feeling after a gig, as he felt self-contempt over the fact that his stage personality—that emanated confidence—was a lie not reflecting the real him.

His first appearance as a solo artist (under the name Roffe the Ruffler), after several years in different bands, came in 2007 when he was offered to record a single for the hit disc Mr. Gillis Reggaepropaganda vol. 2. He sent a card of himself disguised with a skull mask for the cover, the future trademark appearance of Roffe Ruff. He was fired from his job not long after, unrightfully and against Swedish labour law according to himself. His frustration and vindictiveness was vented in his first album Ormar i gräset that was released in 2009. The album was published on his website, downloadable free of charge. Roffe Ruff states that due to the lack of fair ways for artists to make money on their music, he chooses to "fool everyone including myself on the profits". The anonymous release of his music was a liberation, there were no expectations on him and for the first time he could look himself in the mirror without being ashamed of the music. People also seemed to concentrate more on the music and less on the person, allowing people to interpret his music more freely.

As Ormar i gräset was released uncontrolled there are no sales statistics, but the songs from the album have been played over 450,000 times on YouTube—around 100,000 plays more than the songs from Joakim Thåström's Kärlek är for dom, the Swedish Grammy Award album for 2009—and Roffe Ruff was observed in a much wider sphere than he anticipated. The next project, Panterparken EP, a cooperation with his friend and colleague Hofmästarn, was originally meant to be a short four-track EP but was expanded to nine tracks in the end. It was released in 2010, and was made available free of charge by Roffe Ruff on for example The Pirate Bay.

The anonymity created by the mask and the artist name—which at first seemed to have solved his lifelong dilemma—soon became a burden when interest in the man behind the mask was spurred by the mysterious and withdrawn personality. Since Roffe Ruff and his childhood friend sent merchandise from the address where their secret studio was located, more and more people in his neighbourhood figured out the real identity. On New Year's Day 2010 the studio was subject to a burglary, and even one of the policemen who was sent to the crime scene had figured out that Roffe Ruff was one of the victims. A fan of the artist who has recorded the song Snutsvin ("cop pig"), the policeman asked if he could get a hold of a Roffe Ruff shirt anywhere.

Being exposed in just the way he did not want to be, Roffe Ruff's third album Barrabas released in 2011—downloadable for free just as the previous ones. For the first time the songs are about his anonymity, stating that "when I made my previous album I was so naive, I though I was in control of myself and my life. I know now that I was wrong, and that is why I am quitting now. But first I have to do an album that speaks for itself."

2013 the latest album called Bootlegs was released. The album contains 17 tracks recorded together with Rico Won, Snacka San, Hofmästarn, Daltone, Tommy Tip, Organismen. The album contains new and previous released songs at YouTube.

== Musical style ==
Roffe Ruff's albums are a mix of Swedish hip hop, reggae, ragga and dancehall. The atmosphere is mostly dark and the lyric themes include police harassment, criticism of various community institutions, old memories, alienation, depression, social class and consolation drinking. Some of his early songs were created by adding his own texts over the beat of well-known English-speaking artists' productions, such as Chamillionaire's Day dream (became Snutsvin) and Estelle's and Kanye West's American Boy (became Majornapojk), while his last album Barrabas consisted entirely of new productions.

== Discography ==
- Ormar i gräset (2009)
- Panterparken EP (2010) – EP with Hofmästarn
- Barrabas (2011)
- Bootlegs (2013)
- Och han älskade dem alla (2016)
- Lord Gothatron III (2020) – EP
- Panterparken 2 (2023) – with Hofmästarn
