= JB's =

JB's may refer to:

- The J.B.'s James Brown's backing band
- JB's Dudley a club just outside Birmingham, England
- JB's Restaurants located in 6 western states
- JB (disambiguation)
- JBS (disambiguation)
