= VHS (song) =

2021 single by Benjamin Ingrosso and Cherrie

Single by Benjamin Ingrosso & Cherrie
- Released: 19 March 2021
- Length: 3:04
- Label: TEN
- Songwriters: Benjamin Ingrosso; Cherrie; Pontus Persson
- Producer: Pentus Persson

Benjamin Ingrosso singles chronology
"Flickan på min gata" (2021)	"VHS" (2021)	"Allt det vackra" (2021)

Cherrie singles chronology
"Ingen annan än du" (2020)	"VHS" (2021)

"VHS" is a song by Swedish singers Benjamin Ingrosso and Cherrie. It was released as digital download and for streaming on 19 March 2021 by TEN Music Group. The song was written by Benjamin Ingrosso, Cherrie and Pontus Persson.

== Critical reception ==
Jonathan Vautrey from Wiwibloggs said, "The pair deliver a smooth pop song that fits in well with Ingrosso’s recent discography. The Swedish stars sing about a relationship that has now dwindled. While Benjamin wants to rekindle things, the metaphor of a VHS tape is used to signify that Cherrie has moved on to other things."

== Personnel ==
Credits adapted from Tidal.

- Pontus Persson – producer, composer, lyricist
- Benjamin Ingrosso – composer, lyricist
- Cherrie – composer, lyricist
- Sören von Malmborg – engineer
- Simon Sigfridsson – mixer

== Charts ==
Chart (2021)	Peak position
Sweden (Sverigetopplistan)	14

== Certifications ==
Certifications for "VHS"
Region	Certification	Certified units/sales
Sweden (GLF)	Platinum	12,000,000^{†}
^{†} Streaming-only figures based on certification alone.
