= Mange Schmidt =

Swedish rapper

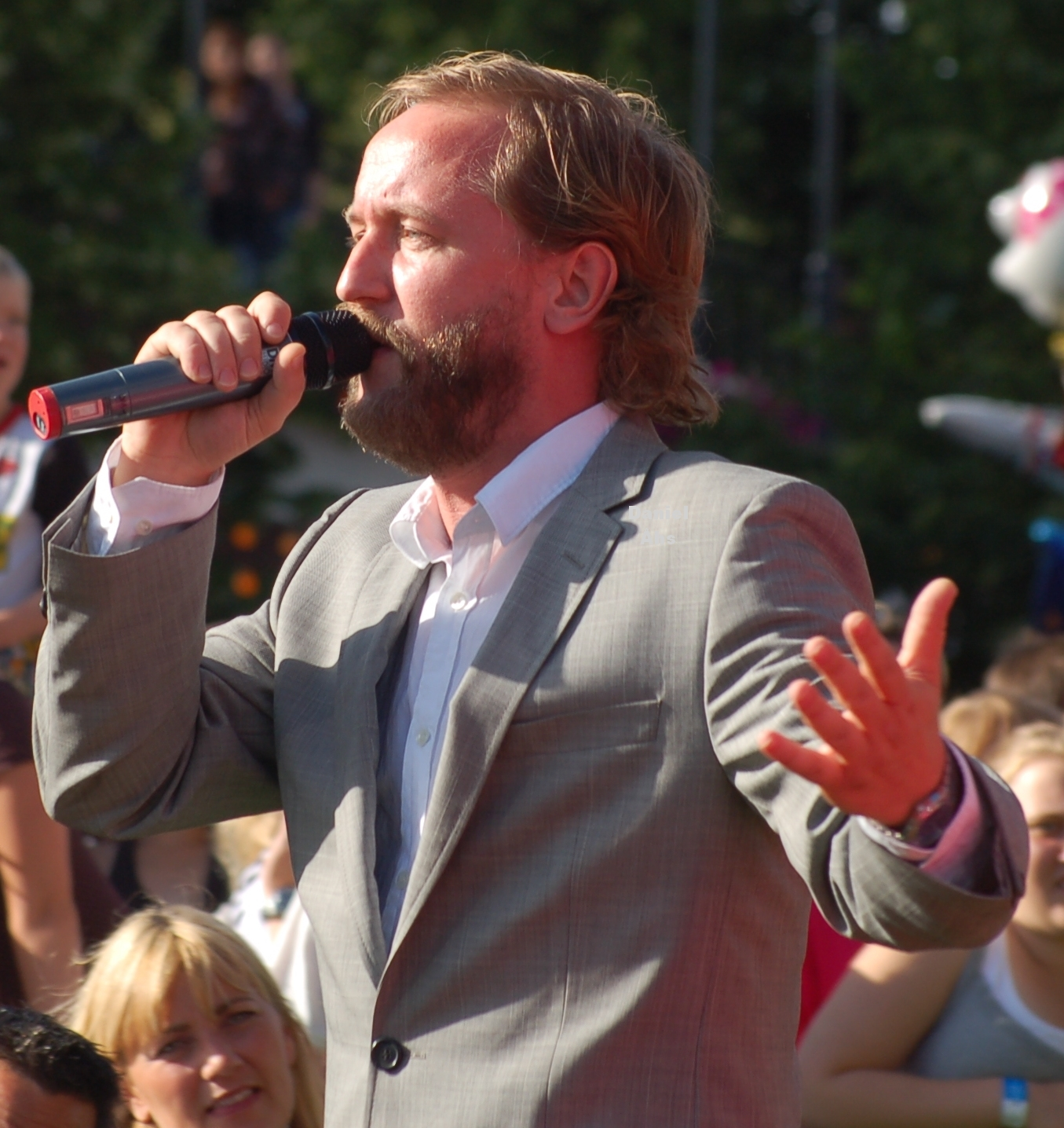
Mange Schmidt at the Gröna Lund, Sommarkrysset

Bo Magnus "Mange" Schmidt (born 17 November 1973), is a Swedish rapper. He was born and raised in Stockholm.

== Discography ==
=== Albums ===
- Mange Schmidt, Greatest Hits
- Samtidigt... i Stockholm (2006)
- Känslan kommer tillbaks (2007)
- Odenplan Stockholm 1988 (2009)
- Ensam bland alla vänner (2013)

=== Singles ===
- "Glassigt" (2006)
- "Vem é han?" (2006)
- "Giftig" ft. Petter (2007)
- "Inget att förlora" (2008)
- "Vet att du förstår" (2009)
- "Ledig" (2009)
- "Wingman" (2010)
- "Allvarligt talat" ft. Vanessa Falk (2010)
- "My name is like the google guy" (2012)
- "Hallå Konsument!" (2020)

== See also ==
- Swedish hip hop
