= Dree Low =

Swedish-Somalian rapper (born 1994)

- Born: Salah Abdi Abdulle; 17 September 1994 (age 32); Österhaninge församling, Stockholm, Sverige
- Other names: Dree; Andre
- Occupations: Rapper; songwriter
- Years active: 2016–2022
- Musical career
- Genre: Hip hop
- Instrument: Vocals
- Labels: CGD; Teldec; RCA; SAIFAM; A&M; Kottolengo

Salah Abdi Abdulle (born 17 September 1994), known professionally as Dree Low, is a Swedish rapper and songwriter of Somali origin. He lives in Husby in western Stockholm. He broke through in 2019 with his albums No hasta mañana and Flawless. In September 2019, Flawless topped the Swedish Albums Chart and his single "Pippi" topped the Swedish Singles Chart. He has collaborated with a number of Swedish rappers; Adel, Пorsche, Stacks & Glocks 1.Cuz, Einár amongst many. He is childhood friends with footballer Robin Quaison.

On the 16th of January 2022, he announced on Instagram that he would stop producing music and that his music would be removed from YouTube, Spotify, Apple Music and similar services, citing he would focus on "what's better" and continue his "creative career in other ways".

== Awards ==
In 2020, Abdulle received two awards at the P3 Guld award ceremony hosted by the public service broadcaster Sveriges Radio P3 Guld.

== Crime ==
Abdulle has been convicted for driving without a license and for drug-related crime.

According to Swedish police, Abdulle has connections to the criminal gang Husbys Hyenor (English: hyenas of Husby), where it is said to be a driving force.

On September 22, 2021, Abdulle was arrested at Stockholm Arlanda Airport in connection to an August convenience store robbery in Akalla, along with two others. He was found guilty on November 1, 2021, and sentenced to one year in prison. He had also been previously wanted for a robbery in western Stockholm in mid-August and was suspected of extortion against a business in the same area over an extended period.

== Discography ==
=== Studio albums ===
Album	Year	Peak chart positions
Album	Year	SWE
No hasta mañana 2	2019	2
Flawless	2019	1
Flawless 2	2020	1
Priceless	2021	1

=== EPs ===
EP	Year	Peak chart positions
EP	Year	SWE
Jet som i France	2017	—
No hasta mañana	2018	16
Tunnelseende	2020	3

=== Singles ===
Title	Year	Peak chart positions		Certification	Album
Title	Year	SWE	DEN	Certification	Album
"Karaktärslösa"	2016	—	—		Non-album single
"För laxen" (featuring Z.E and Blizzy)	2017	— (Note: "För laxen" did not enter the Swedish Singles Chart, but peaked at number 12 on the Swedish Heatseeker chart.)	—		Non-album single
"Långt ifrån samma"	2018	— (Note: "Långt ifrån samma" did not enter the Swedish Singles Chart, but peaked at number four on the Swedish Heatseeker chart.)	—		Non-album single
"Övervakning"	2018	— (Note: "Övervakning" did not enter the Swedish Singles Chart, but peaked at number 14 on the Swedish Heatseeker chart.)	—		Non-album single
"Oj oj oj" (featuring K27)	2018	—	—		Non-album single
"Ramallah" (featuring Adel)	2018	— (Note: "Ramallah" did not enter the Swedish Singles Chart, but peaked at number five on the Swedish Heatseeker chart.)	—		Non-album single
"Hyenor"	2018	56	—		No hasta mañana
"Va"	2019	52	—		No hasta mañana
"Beef" (with Denz and 1.Cuz)	2019	40	—		Non-album single
"Fram" (featuring Yasin)	2019	5	—	GLF: Platinum	No hasta mañana 2
"Akta mannen" (remix) (with 1.Cuz and Einár)	2019	20	—		Tre hjärnor
"På oss"	2019	20	—		Flawless
"Min nivå" (with Einár)	2019	2	—		Non-album single
"Pippi"	2019	1	—	GLF: 4× Platinum	Flawless
"Santa Lucia"	2019	8	—		Flawless
"Kapabel 2" (featuring Adel)	2019	8	—		Flawless
"Dree Low" (with 24 Sju)	2019	—	—		Non-album single
"Top Class" (with P.J)	2019	15	—		Non-album single
"No Cap" (with Adel)	2019	7	—	GLF: Platinum	Non-album single
"XO" (with Yasin)	2019	1	—	GLF: Platinum	Handen under Mona Lisas kjol (Pt:1)
"Mango Lassi" (with Owen)	2020	78	—		Non-album single
"Ice Cream" (with Greekazo)	2020	2	—	GLF: Platinum	Gör nu, tänk sen
"Tipp Tapp" (with Stress and 1.Cuz)	2020	21	—		Playlist 3
"Betong"	2020	62	—		Flawless 2
"Liga"	2020	12	—		Flawless 2
"Pikachu"	2020	19	—		Flawless 2
"SIG Sauer" (with Greekazo and Yasin)	2020	21	—		Non-album single
"Ingen lek" (with Thrife and Einár)	2020	37	—		Nu eller aldrig
"Hela orten dansar"	2020	17	—		Tunnelseende
"Commas" (with Marti)	2020	— (Note: "Commas" did not enter the Swedish Singles Chart, but peaked at number three on the Swedish Heatseeker chart.)	—		Non-album single
"Nina"	2020	62	—		Non-album single
"För stora namn" (with Einár)	2020	34	—		Non-album single
"GS"	2021	8	—		Non-album single
"Ingen kommentar" (with Z.E)	2021	18	—		Non-album single
"Nascar" (with Jamaika and Branco)	2021	—	16		Non-album single
"Skräckfilm" (with Sarettii)	2021	20	—		Non-album single
"Mike Tyson"	2021	34	—		Non-album single
"Sveparen"	2021	26	—		Non-album single
"Go Pro" (featuring O Dawg)	2021	11	—		Non-album single

=== Featured singles ===
Title	Year	Peak chart positions	Album
Title	Year	SWE	Album
"Diva" (remix) (Blizzy featuring Denz, Yasin Byn, Rigo, Aki, Dree Low & Jacco)	2017	— (Note: The remix of "Diva" did not enter the Swedish Singles Chart, but peaked at number three on the Swedish Heatseeker chart.)	Non-album single
"Para" (remix) (Lani Mo featuring Ricky Rich, Thrife, Dree Low, Blizzy and Nathan K)	2018	53	Non-album single
"Robbery" (K27 featuring Dree Low)	2018	94	Non-album single
"Tony & Elvira" (Adel featuring Dree Low)	2019	45	Fem stjärnor
"What It Is" (K27 featuring Dree Low)	2020	36	99 Overall
"Jag har en fråga" (BL featuring Einár, Dree Low and Aden x Asme)	2020	29	Non-album single
"No Way" (Blizzy featuring Dree Low)	2020	64	Phoenix Pt. 1
"Regnar" (Jojo featuring Dree Low)	2020	—	Non-album single
"Tokken" (Hov1 featuring Dree Low)	2021	1	Barn av vår tid
"Nia Mondo" (Owen featuring Dree Low)	2021	33	Non-album single

=== Other charting songs ===
Title	Year	Peak chart positions	Certification	Album
Title	Year	SWE	Certification	Album
"No hasta mañana"	2019	92		No hasta mañana
"Tänk noga" (featuring Asme)	2019	29		No hasta mañana
"Akhi"	2019	32		No hasta mañana 2
"Kapabel" (featuring Adel)	2019	34		No hasta mañana 2
"Out of My Face" (featuring 1.Cuz)	2019	70		No hasta mañana 2
"Tider"	2019	— (Note: "Tider" did not enter the Swedish Singles Chart, but peaked at number one on the Swedish Heatseeker chart.)		No hasta mañana 2
"På riktigt"	2019	— (Note: "På riktigt" did not enter the Swedish Singles Chart, but peaked at number three on the Swedish Heatseeker chart.)		No hasta mañana 2
"Fall inte"	2019	— (Note: "Fall inte" did not enter the Swedish Singles Chart, but peaked at number four on the Swedish Heatseeker chart.)		No hasta mañana 2
"Vad är det"	2019	— (Note: "Vad är det" did not enter the Swedish Singles Chart, but peaked at number 18 on the Swedish Heatseeker chart.)		No hasta mañana 2
"Dag Hammarskjöld" (featuring Einár)	2019	6		Flawless
"Till mig" (featuring 1.Cuz and Aden x Asme)	2019	45		Flawless
"Fryser"	2019	54		Flawless
"Flawless"	2019	55		Flawless
"Världsklass" (featuring P)	2019	56		Flawless
"Äkta mannen" (featuring Thrife)	2019	85		Flawless
"Para knas"	2019	88		Flawless
"Aina eller fans?"	2019	93		Flawless
"Haha"	2019	— (Note: "Haha" did not enter the Swedish Singles Chart, but peaked at number one on the Swedish Heatseeker chart.)		Flawless
"Karaktär"	2019	— (Note: "Karaktär" did not enter the Swedish Singles Chart, but peaked at number four on the Swedish Heatseeker chart.)		Flawless
"Bilen" (1.Cuz featuring Dree Low and Yei Gonzalez)	2019	56		1 år
"Dip Dip" (featuring Owen)	2020	2	GLF: 2× Platinum	Flawless 2
"Bodega" (featuring Adel)	2020	27		Flawless 2
"Hasta luego" (featuring Cherrie)	2020	37		Flawless 2
"What What" (with Thrife and Einár)	2020	41		Flawless 2
"I Made It"	2020	44		Flawless 2
"Outro" (with P.J)	2020	49		Flawless 2
"The Team"	2020	52		Flawless 2
"Kapabel 3" (with Adel)	2020	54		Flawless 2
"Solsidan" (with D.RS)	2020	57		Flawless 2
"Bugs Bunny"	2020	70		Flawless 2
"Sicario" (with Adel)	2020	— (Note: "Sicario" did not enter the Swedish Singles Chart, but peaked at number one on the Swedish Heatseeker chart.)		Flawless 2
"Relate" (with Blizzy)	2020	— (Note: "Relate" did not enter the Swedish Singles Chart, but peaked at number two on the Swedish Heatseeker chart.)		Flawless 2
"Vem e vem?"	2020	— (Note: "Vem e vem?" did not enter the Swedish Singles Chart, but peaked at number five on the Swedish Heatseeker chart.)		Flawless 2
"Träsket"	2020	— (Note: "Träsket" did not enter the Swedish Singles Chart, but peaked at number seven on the Swedish Heatseeker chart.)		Flawless 2
"Satisfaction"	2020	— (Note: "Satisfaction" did not enter the Swedish Singles Chart, but peaked at number 16 on the Swedish Heatseeker chart.)		Flawless 2
"Bovar"	2020	— (Note: "Bovar" did not enter the Swedish Singles Chart, but peaked at number 19 on the Swedish Heatseeker chart.)		Flawless 2
"Ghetto Mamacita" (with Einár)	2020	6		Welcome to Sweden
"På topp" (with Adel and Asme)	2020	58		Guld utav sand
"Dior" (with Adel)	2020	— (Note: "Dior" did not enter the Swedish Singles Chart, but peaked at number 11 on the Swedish Heatseeker chart.)		Guld utav sand
"Audi V2"	2020	25		Tunnelseende
"Fattig som rik"	2020	26		Tunnelseende
"Yea Yea"	2020	70		Tunnelseende
"Vila"	2020	85		Tunnelseende
"Tunnelseende"	2020	— (Note: "Tunnelseende" did not enter the Swedish Singles Chart, but peaked at number two on the Swedish Heatseeker chart.)		Tunnelseende
"Mimosa"	2021	5		Priceless
"SSM LS" (with Einár)	2021	19		Priceless
"Freddy K" (with PJ)	2021	33		Priceless
"Birkin Bag" (with Owen)	2021	39		Priceless
"Benjamins"	2021	44		Priceless
"Plug Talk"	2021	47		Priceless
"Don't Try" (with Einár and Z.E)	2021	53		Priceless
"Small World"	2021	55		Priceless
"General" (with Dani M)	2021	60		Priceless
"Sin City" (with Ricky Rich)	2021	65		Priceless
"Tarzan"	2021	76		Priceless
"Allt är svart"	2021	92		Priceless
"Lita på mig" (with Adel)	2021	— (Note: "Lita på mig" did not enter the Swedish Singles Chart, but peaked at number one on the Swedish Heatseeker chart.)		Priceless
"Trollkarlen" (with Z.E)	2021	92		Hellre död än fattig
"Mbappé" (Asme featuring Dree Low)	2021	55		Tusen Flows
"Calma" (with Adel)	2021	— (Note: "Calma" did not enter the Swedish Singellista Chart, but peaked at number eight on the Swedish Heatseeker Chart.)		Blod svett och tårar
