= Feven =

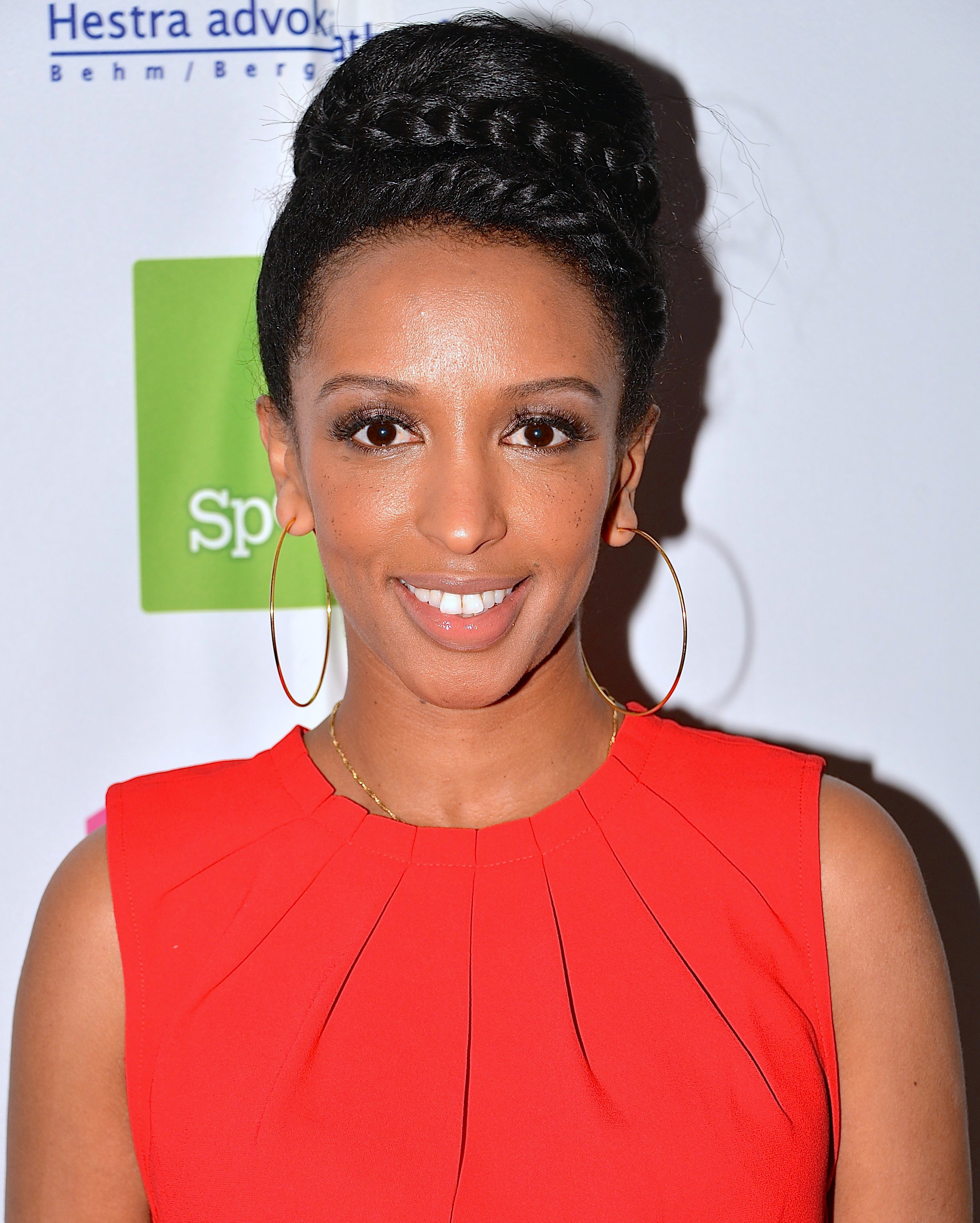
- Feven at the Grammis awards 2013

Background information
- Born: Feven Ghebremicael; 19 September 1975 (age 51); Massawa, Eritrea
- Genre: Rap
- Occupation: Rapper
- Years active: 2000–2001

Feven Ghebremicael (born 19 October 1975), known mononymously as Feven, is a Swedish rap artist.

In 2000, she released the music album Hela vägen ut with the charting songs "Dom tio budorden" and "Bränn BH:n". In 2001, she released the music single "Vill ha" featuring Petter. As well as the music single "It's only love".

She is a co-writer of the book Svartskallar.

On 20 February 2001, she won a Grammis award in the category Hip Hop/Soul Album of the Year. Her thank-you speech received plenty of attention as she heavily used American street slang.

== Singles ==
Title	Year	Peak chart positions	Album	−1	SWE	−1	"Dom tio budorden"	2000	1	Non-album single
