= Yasin (rapper) =

Swedish rapper (born 1998)

- Also known as: Yasin, Yasin Byn, Yasin The Don, Stockholm Don Dara, YB
- Born: Yasin Abdullahi Mahamoud; 11 January 1998 (age 28); Rinkeby, Stockholm, Sweden
- Origin: Rinkeby, Sweden
- Genres: Gangsta rap, hip hop
- Occupations: Rapper, singer
- Years active: 2014–present
- Label: Byn Block Entertainment
- Website: Official website

Yasin Abdullahi Mahamoud (born 11 January 1998), known as Yasin or Yasin Byn, is a Swedish rapper and singer.

== Early life ==
Yasin Abdullahi Mahamoud was born to a Somali family in Rinkeby, part of the Swedish Million Programme for affordable housing in northwest Stockholm, and grew up with his mother and five siblings. His stage name Yasin Byn hints at his connection to Rinkeby, which is popularly called Byn ("the village").

== Career ==
Mahamoud started in hip hop music recording online videos with his childhood friends, including Jaffar Byn. That led to him joining the Swedish hip hop collective Byn Block Entertainment (BBE) with aspiring artists mostly from Rinkeby. BBE subsequently started collaborating with artists from the wider Järva region, forming the larger hip hop collective Ghetto Superstars. In 2016, his music was included in the Ghetto Superstars compilation album Allstars.

In 2019, he released his official debut single "DSGIS", an abbreviation of det som göms i snö ( meaning "that which is hidden in snow") from a Swedish proverb. The follow-up single "XO" in collaboration with Swedish rapper Dree Low topped Sverigetopplistan, the Swedish national record chart. Yasin's album Handen under Mona Lisas kjol (Pt:1) topped the Swedish album chart. His single, "Talk 2 Me", was released in December 2020 and reached the first spot on the Swedish Singles Chart.

== Convictions ==
Mahamoud was sentenced in May 2018 to two years and three months' imprisonment for aggravated weapon-related crimes. He was released after serving two-thirds of his sentence.

On 31 December 2020, Mahamoud was arrested and detained on the charge of kidnapping of rival rapper Einár and was sentenced to 10 months in prison by the Stockholm District Court in 2021. He was later released from prison on 28 December 2021.

== Discography ==
=== Studio albums ===
Title	Year	Peak positions		Certifications
Title	Year	SWE	NOR	Certifications
98.01.11	2020	1	11	IFPI Sverige: 2× Platinum
More to Life	2020	1	—	IFPI Sverige: Gold
Pistoler poesi och sex	2023	1	3	
Your Turn in Blue	2026	2	25	

=== Compilation albums ===
Title	Year	Peak positions	
Title	Year	SWE	NOR
Lost Tapes	2025	1	12

=== EPs ===
Title	Year	Peak positions
Title	Year	SWE
Handen under Mona Lisas kjol (Pt:1)	2019	1
Del två	2021	—
EP med E4an (with E4an)	2022	—
Six V's (with Orio)	2022	7
En paus från internet – Del 1	2023	2

=== Singles ===
Title	Year	Peak positions	Certifications	Album
Title	Year	SWE	Certifications	Album
"Yasin"	2015	—		Non-album singles
"Allstars"	2016	—		Non-album singles
"Stäcka"	2017	—		Non-album singles
"Området"	2017	—		Non-album singles
"Bara om jag känner för det" / "Hey (Rinkeby)"	2017	— (Note: "Hey (Rinkeby)" did not enter the Swedish Singles Chart, but peaked at number four on the Swedish Heatseeker chart.)		Non-album singles
"Chicago"	2018	69	IFPI Sverige: Gold	Non-album singles
"BonVoyage"	2018	86		Non-album singles
"Kevin Gates"	2018	20	IFPI Sverige: Gold	Non-album singles
"Fram" (with Dree Low)	2019	5	IFPI Sverige: Platinum	No hasta mañana 2
"DSGIS"	2019	8		Handen under Mona Lisas kjol (Pt:1)
"XO" (with Dree Low)	2019	1	IFPI Sverige: Platinum	Handen under Mona Lisas kjol (Pt:1)
"SIG Sauer" (with Dree Low and Greekazo)	2020	21		Flawless 2
"Workin"	2020	5	IFPI Sverige: 2× Platinum	Non-album singles
"Ge upp igen" (with Miriam Bryant)	2020	1		Non-album singles
"Feel My Pain"	2020	—		Non-album singles
"123" (Cherrie featuring Yasin)	2020	64		Non-album singles
"Talk 2 Me"	2020	12		Non-album singles
"I Remember"	2020	—		Non-album singles
"Heartbroken"	2021	—		Non-album singles
"Botten" (with E4an)	2021	66		Non-album singles
"20 talet"	2022	3		Non-album singles
"V12"	2022	9		Non-album singles
"Sista spåret"	2022	11		Non-album singles
"Rec 130622"	2022	21		Non-album singles
"Flygplansläge" (with E4an)	2022	17		EP med E4an
"Team 2 Much" (with Eno)	2022	15		Brot
"Magazine" (with Pa Salieu)	2022	29		Non-album single
"Smooth" (with Headie One)	2022	37		No Borders: European Compilation Project
"Nånting i luften"	2022	14	IFPI Sverige: Platinum	Pistoler poesi och sex
"Nordvästra"	2023	16		Pistoler poesi och sex
"Hoodrich"	2023	9		Pistoler poesi och sex
"Spiderman del 2"	2023	33		Pistoler poesi och sex
"Rap är ingen konst"	2023	21		Pistoler poesi och sex
"Online"	2023	31		Pistoler poesi och sex
"Har dig"	2023	2	IFPI Sverige: Platinum	Pistoler poesi och sex
"Fantasy"	2023	13		Non-album singles
"Ambitions of a Rider" (with JB)	2023	25		Non-album singles
"Slowmotion" (with AP51)	2023	— (Note: "Slowmotion" did not enter the Swedish Singellista Chart, but peaked at number one on the Swedish Heatseeker Chart.)		Non-album singles
"Salam"	2023	— (Note: "Salam" did not enter the Swedish Singellista Chart, but peaked at number one on the Swedish Heatseeker Chart.)		Non-album singles
"Salam"	2023	18		Non-album singles
"Zombie" (with Haval)	2023	12		Non-album singles
"Stockholm, Sweden"	2023	6		Non-album singles
"Sticky" (with Lekaye)	2024	28		Non-album singles
"Hur som helst"	2024	18		Non-album singles
"Ännu en dag" (with Sickan)	2024	3		Non-album singles
"Cecilia Lind"	2024	1		Non-album singles
"Vem som helst"	2024	57		Non-album singles
"See Me Shine" / "För idag"	2025	93		Non-album singles
"Min Bitch"	2025	1		Lost Tapes
"Love Doctor's" (with Sexmane)	2025	76		Non-album singles
"Kraft"	2025	36		Non-album singles
"Matadoren"	2026	3		Your Turn in Blue
"Best Friends"	2026	17		Your Turn in Blue
"1991"	2026	8		Your Turn in Blue

=== Other charted and certified songs ===
Title	Year	Peak positions	Certifications	Album
Title	Year	SWE	Certifications	Album
"Trakten min"	2016	— (Note: "Trakten min" did not enter the Swedish Singles Chart, but peaked at number two on the Swedish Heatseeker chart.)	IFPI Sverige: Platinum	Allstars
"Pt:1"	2019	5		Handen under Mona Lisas kjol (Pt:1)
"Not for Sale"	2020	9		Handen under Mona Lisas kjol (Pt:1)
"John Snow"	2020	24	IFPI Sverige: Gold	Handen under Mona Lisas kjol (Pt:1)
"WLIT"	2020	36		Handen under Mona Lisas kjol (Pt:1)
"Young & Heartless"	2020	3	IFPI Sverige: 3× Platinum	98.01.11
"Hiphop n RnB"	2020	6	IFPI Sverige: 3× Platinum	98.01.11
"Source" (with Aden)	2020	7	IFPI Sverige: Platinum	98.01.11
"Buzz Light Year"	2020	9	IFPI Sverige: Gold	98.01.11
"Chris Tukker" (with Asme)	2020	12	IFPI Sverige: Gold	98.01.11
"Drownin"	2020	14	IFPI Sverige: Platinum	98.01.11
"Spiderman (Intro)"	2020	15	IFPI Sverige: Platinum	98.01.11
"Amen"	2020	19	IFPI Sverige: Gold	98.01.11
"Think About It"	2020	21		98.01.11
"I jakt på kaniner" (1.Cuz featuring Yasin)	2020	54		FFF
"Canada Goose" (with Dante)	2020	18	IFPI Sverige: Gold	More to Life
"No Talk"	2020	22	IFPI Sverige: Gold	More to Life
"More to Life (Interlude)"	2020	26		More to Life
"Pull Up"	2020	38		More to Life
"Edu" (with Mona Masrour)	2020	18	IFPI Sverige: Gold	More to Life
"On Sight"	2020	46		More to Life
"Creative"	2020	56		More to Life
"Nirvana"	2020	68		More to Life
"Get the Strap"	2020	69		More to Life
"Ciaga"	2020	81		More to Life
"Applause"	2020	84		More to Life
"Stressa"	2020	98		More to Life
"Another Way"	2020	— (Note: "Another Way" did not enter the Sverigetopplistan, but peaked at number two on the Heatseeker chart.)		More to Life
"Mexico" (Jireel featuring Yasin)	2021	68		1953
"La dame bleue"	2021	8		Del två
"Mitt Notre Dame"	2021	13		Del två
"More Life (Extended Version)"	2021	26		Del två
"Brush It Off"	2021	30		Del två
"Brown Liquor" (Aden featuring Yasin)	2021	— (Note: "Brown Liquor" did not enter the Sverigetopplistan, but peaked at number two on the Heatseeker chart.)		Ingen efter tolv
"Oppblock" (JB featuring Yasin)	2021	70		Guantanamo
"Walalkey" (with E4an)	2022	86		EP med E4an
"Lurkin" (with E4an)	2022	— (Note: "Lurkin" did not enter the Swedish Singellista Chart, but peaked at number one on the Swedish Heatseeker Chart.)		EP med E4an
"Go n Get" (with E4an)	2022	— (Note: "Go n Get" did not enter the Swedish Singellista Chart, but peaked at number four on the Swedish Heatseeker Chart.)		EP med E4an
"v3 (Vaksam)" (with Orio)	2022	64		Six V's
"v4 (Freeslaktish)" (with Orio)	2022	37		Six V's
"v6 (G19)" (with Orio featuring Backroad Gee)	2022	— (Note: "v6 (G19)" did not enter the Swedish Singellista Chart, but peaked at number three on the Swedish Heatseeker Chart.)		Six V's
"v7 (WWW)" (with Orio featuring WeWantWraiths)	2022	— (Note: "v7 (WWW)" did not enter the Swedish Singellista Chart, but peaked at number 19 on the Swedish Heatseeker Chart.)		Six V's
"Free at Last"	2023	54		Pistoler poesi och sex
"Fri från mig själv"	2023	40		Pistoler poesi och sex
"Pistoler poesi och sex"	2023	63		Pistoler poesi och sex
"Turbolens"	2023	53		Pistoler poesi och sex
"Långt hemifrån"	2023	61		Pistoler poesi och sex
"Turbo S"	2023	77		Pistoler poesi och sex
"Tankarna" (Jae featuring Yasin)	2023	89		Långt ifrån Stockholm
"Problem"	2023	50		En paus från internet – Del 1
"Lokalisering"	2023	54		En paus från internet – Del 1
"Black Owned Business"	2023	70		En paus från internet – Del 1
"Twogunkid"	2023	49		En paus från internet – Del 1
"Falling Soldier"	2023	87		En paus från internet – Del 1
"Reminisce" (with Pabi)	2025	11		Lost Tapes
"Vart än jag går"	2025	7		Lost Tapes
"Min 9a"	2025	29		Lost Tapes
"Paranoid"	2025	46		Lost Tapes
"Hooyo"	2025	64		Lost Tapes
"Swosh"	2025	45		Lost Tapes
"Dem kallar mig"	2025	— (Note: "Dem kallar mig" did not enter the Swedish Singellista Chart, but peaked at number one on the Swedish Heatseeker chart.)		Lost Tapes
"Låt oss"	2025	92		Lost Tapes
"Alla mina grabbar dom e hundra"	2025	53		Lost Tapes
"Sikta högt"	2025	— (Note: "Sikta högt" did not enter the Swedish Singellista Chart, but peaked at number four on the Swedish Heatseeker chart.)		Lost Tapes
"Gud förlåt"	2025	40		Lost Tapes
"Pushar" (live)	2025	31		Lost Tapes
"Mob Style" (with WeWantWraiths)	2025	100		Lost in Transit
"The Mud"	2026	48		Your Turn in Blue
"GG"	2026	43		Your Turn in Blue
"AR15"	2026	22		Your Turn in Blue
"SF90"	2026	35		Your Turn in Blue
"Vänta"	2026	21		Your Turn in Blue
"Lilla flicka"	2026	— (Note: "Lilla flicka" did not enter the Swedish Singles Chart, but peaked at number 1 on the Swedish Heatseeker chart.)		Your Turn in Blue
"Beroende personlighet"	2026	— (Note: "Beroende personlighet" did not enter the Swedish Singles Chart, but peaked at number 6 on the Swedish Heatseeker chart.)		Your Turn in Blue
"Konstatera"	2026	— (Note: "Konstatera" did not enter the Swedish Singles Chart, but peaked at number 9 on the Swedish Heatseeker chart.)		Your Turn in Blue
"Idileey"	2026	87		Your Turn in Blue
