= Jaffar Byn =

Swedish rapper

Jafar Ahmed Sadik (born 4 January 1996), better known as Jaffar Byn or JB, is a Swedish-Somali rapper.

== Personal life ==
Sadik was born in Rinkeby, Stockholm, Sweden. He resides in Rinkeby.

== Legal issues ==
In 2017, he was sentenced to four years imprisonment for the possession of weapons; he was released in October 2020 after serving three years of his sentence.

== Discography ==
=== Studio albums ===
| Album | Year | Peak chart positions |
| Album | Year | SWE |
|---|---|---|
| Ghettokända | 2018 | — |
| Guantanamo | 2021 | 7 |
| JB AHSP del 2 | 2022 | 24 |

=== EPs ===
- Trilogin (2021)

=== Singles ===
| Title | Year | Peak chart positions | Album |
| Title | Year | SWE | Album |
|---|---|---|---|
| "Pistol Whip" | 2020 | 11 | Non-album single |
| "Rea" | 2021 | 34 | Guantanamo |
| "Greatest of All Time (Freeslaktish)" | 2021 | — (Note: "Greatest of All Time (Freeslaktish)" did not enter the Swedish Singellista Chart, but peaked at number one on the Swedish Heatseeker Chart.) | Non-album singles |
| "Solvalla" | 2022 | 97 | Non-album singles |
| "Ambitions of a Rider" (with Yasin) | 2023 | 25 | Non-album singles |

=== Other charted songs ===
| Title | Year | Peak chart positions | EP |
| Title | Year | SWE | EP |
|---|---|---|---|
| "Ett paradis utan änglar" (featuring Iman) | 2021 | — (Note: "Ett paradis utan änglar" did not enter the Swedish Singles Chart, but peaked at number nine on the Swedish Heatseeker chart.) | Trilogin |
| "Bakom kulisserna" (with Yasin) | 2021 | 50 | Trilogin |
| "Döden" | 2021 | 48 | Trilogin |
| "Troublesome 21" | 2021 | 67 | Guantanamo |
| "Oppblock" (featuring Yasin) | 2021 | 70 | Guantanamo |
