= Greekazo =

Swedish rapper (born 2001)

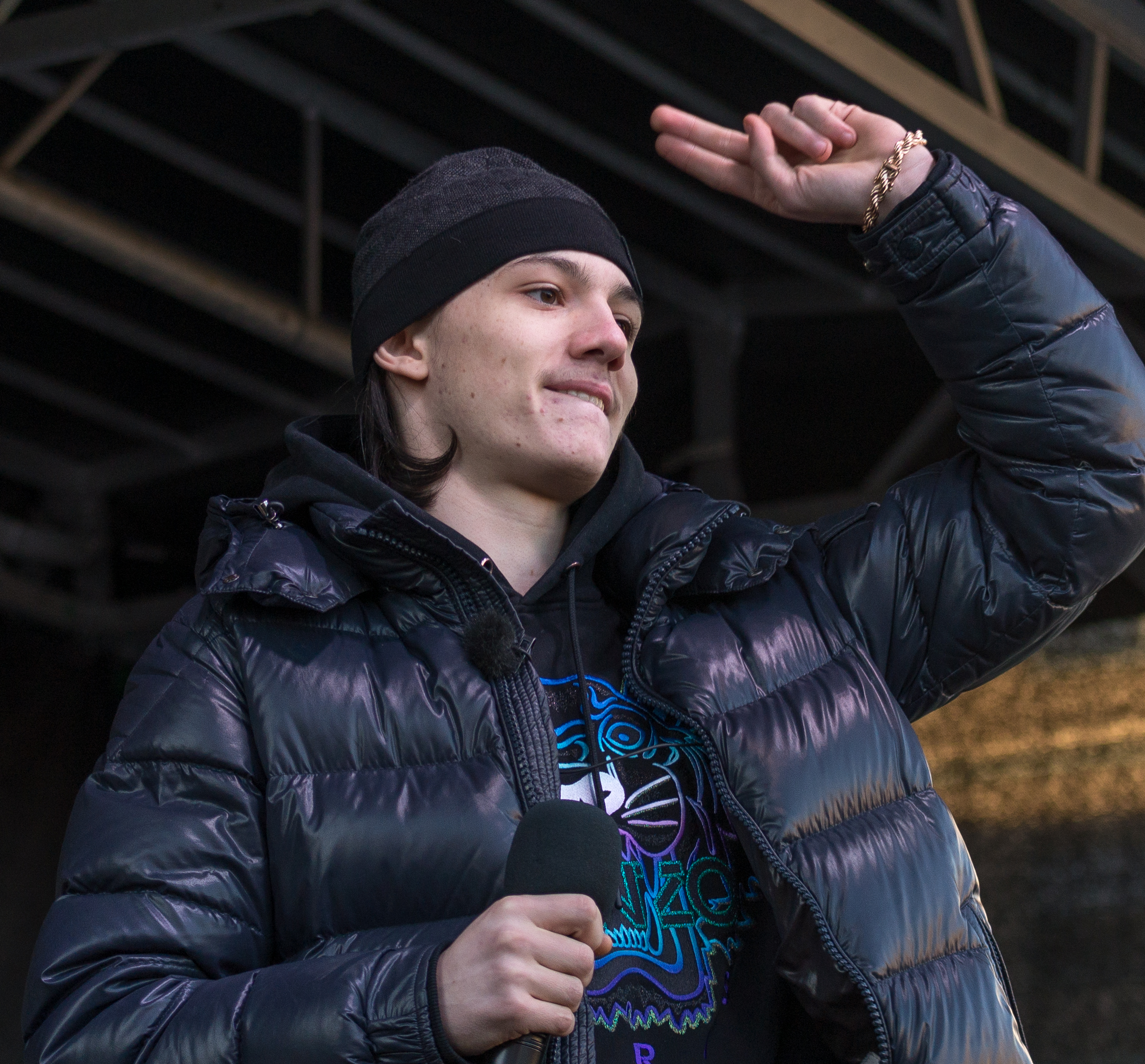
- Greekazo performing in February 2020

Background information
- Also known as: Alex
- Born: Alexander Cielma Miliarakis; 30 March 2001 (age 25); Hässelby, Stockholm, Sweden
- Genres: Hip hop; Gangsta rap
- Occupations: Rapper; singer
- Instrument: Voice
- Years active: 2019–present
- Label: HotSpot Music

Alexander Cielma Miliarakis (born 30 March 2001) known professionally as Greekazo, is a Swedish rapper. Greekazo grew up in Hässelby in Stockholm and was born to parents of Polish and Greek background.

Greekazo started his career on 31 July 2019, with the music single "HotSpot", which has received over 23 million streams on Spotify.

His other songs have been streamed over 60 million times on Spotify. He released his debut studio album Gör nu, tänk sen on 30 March 2020, which peaked at number three on the Swedish Albums Chart.

In December 2019, Greekazo appeared in a much publicized interview with Malou von Sivers on her talkshow Malou efter tio broadcast on TV4. He had been invited to talk about his career, but the interview soon turned into questions about his views on criminality and drugs. The interview received a lot of criticism and a debate about if one person can be held accountable for crime sprees in the suburbs. Greekazo later received an invitation to come back to the show for another interview, but denied the request, since he believed he did not have the need to "prove anything".

== Discography ==
=== Albums ===
Title	Details	Peak chart positions
Title	Details	SWE
Gör nu, tänk sen	Released: 30 March 2020; Label: HotSpot Music; Formats: Digital download, streaming	3
6ton5	Released: 16 April 2021; Label: Iconic Music, HotSpot Music; Formats: Digital download, streaming	15

=== Singles ===
Title	Year	Peak chart positions	Certification	Album
Title	Year	SWE	Certification	Album
"HotSpot" (with DnoteOnDaBeat)	2019	3	GLF: Gold	Gör nu, tänk sen
"Sprayad" (with DnoteOnDaBeat and Yei Gonzalez)	2019	3		Non-album single
"Försent" (with 1.Cuz and Yei Gonzalez)	2019	2	GLF: 2× Platinum	1 år
"Apoteket" (with Yei Gonzalez and DnoteOnDaBeat)	2019	10		Non-album single
"Ice Cream" (with Dree Low)	2020	2	GLF: Platinum	Gör nu, tänk sen
"Puta" (with Yei Gonzalez)	2020	56		Gör nu, tänk sen
"SIG Sauer" (Dree Low featuring Greekazo and Yasin)	2020	21		Non-album single
"Eat Sleep Repeat" (with Yei Gonzalez)	2020	77		Non-album single
"Vart vi står" (with L.T)	2020	—		Non-album single
"Kaktus" (with 24K)	2020	— (Note: "Kaktus" did not enter the Swedish Singles Chart, but peaked at number 15 on the Swedish Heatseeker chart.)		Före min tid 2
"Gangsta Christmas" (featuring E4an)	2020	—		Non-album single
"Jag ljög"	2021	— (Note: "Jag ljög" did not enter the Swedish Singles Chart, but peaked at number nine on the Swedish Heatseeker chart.)		6ton5
"Ingen annan"	2021	96		6ton5
"Fuck You"	2021	— (Note: "Fuck You" did not enter the Swedish Singellista Chart, but peaked at number six on the Swedish Heatseeker Chart.)		6ton5
"Cut 'Em Off" (with B.Baby)	2021	— (Note: "Cut 'Em Off" did not enter the Swedish Singellista Chart, but peaked at number 13 on the Swedish Heatseeker Chart.)		Chase the Baby
"Kommer & går"	2022	60		Non-album singles
"G-Code" (featuring Mackan)	2022	28		Non-album singles
"Bästfriend" (with Mackan)	2022	89		Non-album singles
"Skimma" (with Rami and Mackan)	2022	53		Non-album singles
"Nervous" (with Mackan)	2022	— (Note: "Nervous" did not enter the Swedish Singellista Chart, but peaked at number 12 on the Swedish Heatseeker Chart.)		Non-album singles
"Piloter" (with DNoteOnDaBeat)	2023	95		Non-album singles
"Håll käften"	2024	— (Note: "Håll käften" did not enter the Swedish Singellista Chart, but peaked at number two on the Swedish Heatseeker Chart.)		Non-album singles
"Buntar o sånt" (with 23 and Sweyway)	2024	54		Non-album singles
"2lurar"	2024	5		Non-album singles
"Upplopp" (with Dani M)	2024	91		Non-album singles
"Håller mig själv" (with Adaam and Romanos)	2025	2		Nya skolans ledare
"Trending" (with Adaam and NBLNation)	2025	— (Note: "Trending" did not enter the Swedish Singellista Chart, but peaked at number four on the Swedish Heatseeker Chart.)		Non-album single
"Heard of Me" (with Adaam)	2025	— (Note: "Heard of Me" did not enter the Swedish Singellista Chart, but peaked at number four on the Swedish Heatseeker Chart.)		Nya skolans ledare
"FNM" (with NBLNation)	2026	— (Note: "FNM" did not enter the Swedish Singellista Chart, but peaked at number five on the Swedish Heatseeker Chart.)		Non-album singles
"Final" (with Naod and NBLNation)	2026	86		Non-album singles
"360" (with Romanos and Hanna Ferm)	2026	99		Non-album singles
"La Liga" (with Adaam, Z.E and Naod)	2026	78		Non-album singles

==== Featured singles ====
Title	Year	Peak chart positions	Album
Title	Year	NOR	Album
"Don't You" (Sickick featuring Greekazo)	2021	—	Non-album singles
"Bonanza" (Roc Boyz featuring Greekazo)	2022	2	Non-album singles

=== Other charted songs ===
Title	Year	Peak chart positions	Album
Title	Year	SWE	Album
"Big Mac"	2020	33	Gör nu, tänk sen
"Försent 2" (with Yei Gonzalez, DnoteOnDaBeat and 1.Cuz)	2020	97	Gör nu, tänk sen
"Solo" (with K27 and DnoteOnDaBeat)	2020	— (Note: "Solo" did not enter the Swedish Singles Chart, but peaked at number 15 on the Swedish Heatseeker chart.)	Gör nu, tänk sen
"Piloter" (with DnoteOnDaBeat)	2020	— (Note: "Piloter" did not enter the Swedish Singles Chart, but peaked at number four on the Swedish Heatseeker chart.)	Gör nu, tänk sen
"Smutsig värld" (featuring B.Baby)	2021	— (Note: "Smutsig värld" did not enter the Swedish Singellista Chart, but peaked at number two on the Swedish Heatseeker Chart.)	6ton5
"Känslor" (Asme featuring Greekazo)	2021	— (Note: "Känslor" did not enter the Swedish Singles Chart, but peaked at number 13 on the Swedish Heatseeker chart.)	Tusen flows
