= Denz (rapper) =

Swedish rapper

- Born: Abel Tesfay; 1993 (age 32–33); Bromma, Stockholm, Sweden
- Origin: Rissne, Stockholm
- Genres: Hip hop, rap
- Occupation: Rapper
- Years active: 2014–present
- Labels: Nivy (2014–2018); VVS Music (2018–)

Abel Tesfay (born 1993), known professionally as Denz, is a Swedish rapper. He became known in Sweden in 2014 with the singles Jetski and Måste. He later released the album Medan vi lever (2019).

== Early life ==
Tesfay was born in Bromma, Stockholm, and moved to the suburb of Rissne as a teenager. He has Eritrean background and grew up in the Stockholm area.

== Career ==
Denz began his music career in 2014, first appearing as a guest on rapper Pato Pooh's song Västeraq. He soon released the singles Jetski and Måste.

Over the following years, he released a series of singles and collaborations. In 2019, he released his debut studio album, Medan vi lever. The album was reviewed in Dagens Nyheter.

Denz has continued to release music throughout the 2020s, including singles and extended plays.

== Discography ==
=== Studio albums ===
- Medan vi lever (2019)

=== Extended plays ===
- F.T.T.R (2019)

=== Singles ===
- Jetski (2014)
- Måste (2014)
- Ekta (2017)
- Chit Chat (2022)
