= Swedish hip-hop =

Music genre

Swedish hip-hop originated in the cities of Stockholm and Malmö in the first half of the 1980s. Early on, most rappers in Sweden performed in English. Funkalics and The Latin Kings, two very different acts united by their innovative use of the Swedish language, debuted a decade later and paved the way for a second, and bigger, breakthrough for Swedish hip-hop. Today, some of the most popular rappers use Swedish, often in different accents.

== History ==
=== Origins ===
Percussionist Per Cussion (of reggae-punk band Dag Vag) and Grandmaster Funk are generally credited with bringing hip-hop to Sweden. In 1984 they released the songs "Don't Stop", "Snow Blind" and "Payin´ The Price". Breakdancing had arrived a year earlier and spread quickly, its forerunners known as Robot Lasse, Mark, Spirio and Perkeles.

In 1984, Jan Fex, from Lund, released an album, "Utanför mitt liv", on Mercury Records with the first contemporary R&B, rap and EDM songs in Swedish, 5 years before Just D's debut. The album came about after Fex had lived in New York in 1982 and 1983. Fex moved to Copenhagen, Denmark in 1985 and started a Fairlight CMI rental service, thereby becoming one of the first Swedes to work with digital samplers and sequencers. The vinyl release never made it to CD and a re-master had digital release in 2025.

In the summer of 1984, following a major dance competition, Double M Crew, Abdula & The Rockers, Rock Ski, Almighty T and MC II Fresh joined together to form the hip-hop collective Ice Cold Rockers, a crew consisting of rappers, scratchers, dancers and graffiti artists. Broadcaster D and One Eye Que (later recording under the name Ayo) started their collaboration.

Sweden, outside of Stockholm, soon became familiar with hip-hop when the popular movie Stockholmsnatt, which featured the IC Rockers, came out. Pop-C and Snoopy were on the soundtrack and had a hit in 1986 with their single "Next Time".

New artists followed in their tracks. Rob'n'Raz produced the album Competition Is None and introduced Papa Dee's dub and dancehall influenced rap to the Swedes. See-Que, from Stockholm, collaborated with the American label Priority Records on their compilation album Basement Flavor.

The first real rap song in Swedish "Jag Är Def" came from MC Tim in 1989. The year after, Just D was formed and their decision to rap in Swedish would earn them a huge fan base, and introduce rap to the general populace.

=== The first breakthrough ===
By the end of the 1980s, hip-hop became increasingly more popular in Sweden. The international success of rapper/singer Neneh Cherry's crossover album, Raw Like Sushi, made the Swedish media take a closer look at the genre in the context of Sweden's native artists. The inaugural Swedish Championship in Rap was held in 1989 and the winner was ADL's group Sons Of Soul. The runner-up was Ms Melodie, who went on to have a career as Leila K. Briefly picking up the torch of Neneh Cherry, Leila K had an international crossover hit with the rap track "Got To Get". The third place was taken by the legendary Vasteras rapper Mc Magic Dee and his Thirteen cent Killer. There was now a solid market for rap music and record companies were taking notice.

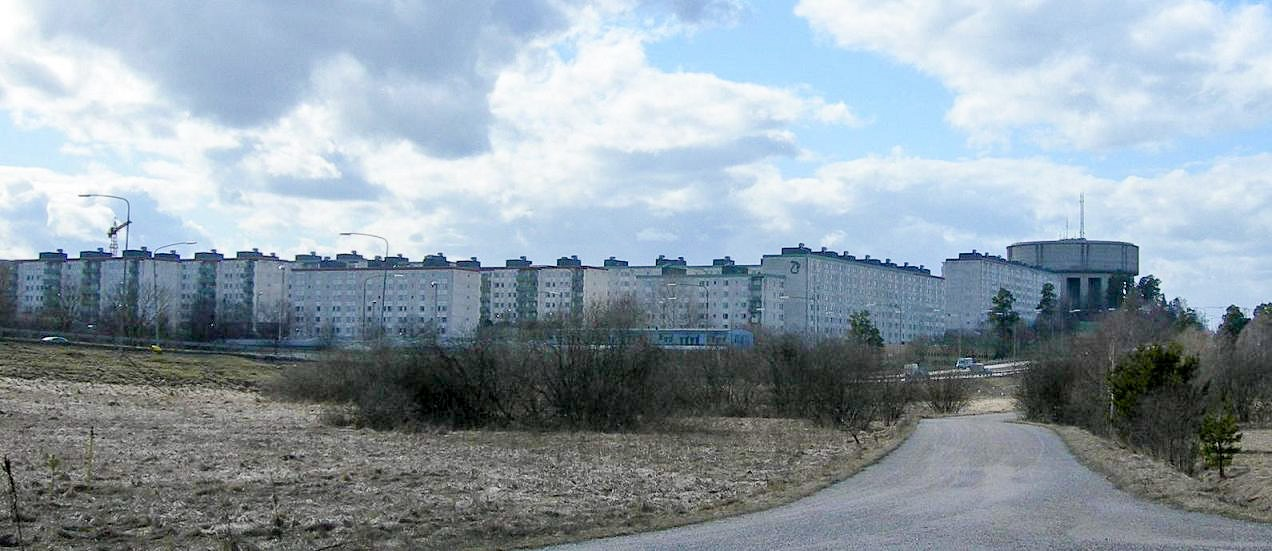
Modern Tensta, with its concrete apartment buildings of Plattenbau style, was (like nearby Rinkeby and Hjulsta) part of the so-called Million Programme.

Just D's ironically titled album Rock N Roll became popular with many people who had yet to embrace hip-hop. Snoopy (aka Quincy Jones III) had moved to the USA to produce acts like Young MC, LL Cool J and Ice Cube. The Sure Shot Groove (MC Stranger and Complicated C) debuted with the 12-inch Rhymes R Flowin'. The collective Infinite Mass won the Swedish qualification finals for the World Rap Competition and released their EP Da Blackmass. One of their songs, "Shoot The Racist", was on the soundtrack for the 1993 movie Sökarna and became hugely popular. It was later renamed "Area Turns Red" due to some media controversy over the lyrics.

The Latin Kings ushered in a new wave of Swedish hip-hop artists. They used "Rinkeby Swedish", sometimes described as a kind of a pidgin language, to describe life in the 'Million Programme' suburbs of Stockholm. Their 1994 debut album Välkommen till Förorten (Welcome to the suburb), produced by Gordon Cyrus and founder of first the Swedish Hip Hop label Breakin Bread, was a success in the charts and favorite with the critics. The coming generation of Swedish hip-hop artists would be distinguished from the first by their inclusion of Swedish language rhymes, as opposed to the exclusive use of English rhymes by Sweden's first generation of rappers.

=== The second breakthrough ===
In 1998 Petter debuted with the album Mitt sjätte sinne, which became an enormous success and started the Swedish hip-hop boom of the late 1990s. With him came an array of artists, such as Thomas Rusiak, DJ Sleepy and Eye-n'-I. Other artists that achieved mainstream popularity following Petter's break include Ken Ring and Ayo. Feven released her acclaimed album Hela Vägen Ut. Looptroop developed a middle class revolutionary style. Timbuktu, a native of Lund, emerged and went on to gain a reputation as one of Sweden's most popular MCs.

=== 21st century ===
Swedish rappers who have achieved nationwide recognition include: Promoe, Snook, Ayesha, Fjärde Världen, Fattaru, Ison & Fille, Advance Patrol, Lazee, Toftgard, and Adam Tensta.

Many of these artists have been exposed to a domestic hip-hop culture since they were born, or very young. In a sense the Swedish scene has become less volatile, and also less vulnerable to becoming extinct. Influence from the U.S. culture is no longer as significant; American hip-hop is still important but outside influences also come from French, British, Danish, and Japanese hip-hop, and other regions around the world with vibrant and innovative music scenes. Due to file sharing via the Internet and changing consumer markets, the number of records an artist has sold is not necessarily indicative of how popular or important that artist is. There are Swedish hip-hop acts who release records for what they know is going to be an economic loss, in hope of earning their money through concerts and other ventures.

The hip-hop genres represented in Swedish hip-hop are plentiful. Alternative hip-hop is, most likely, bigger than Gangsta and Hardcore combined. There are also many fusion genres such as Neo soul, Grime, and Reggaeton.

Swedish rap often deals with themes of multiculturalism and positive suburban identity. Many rappers affirm their ethnic and racial background, but tend to identify more with their community and with Swedish minorities in general rather than with specific ethnic cultures, or with mainstream Swedish culture. Rapper Adam Tensta, for instance, takes his name from the suburb of Tensta and rhymes in his "Banging on the System": "Every burb the same man / and we got every color / we all the same man / at least to them we are / we all immigrants".

2008 is a European Year of Intercultural Dialogue and part of this effort was a hip-hop summit in Stockholm called Make it blast!, which took place on 27 May. Chaired by Timbuktu, the festival featured rappers from Sweden and elsewhere in Europe and aimed to create dialogue between artists as well as audiences of the European urban music scene.

== Notable artists ==
The list of people who have made a name for themselves in Swedish hip-hop can be made very long. With a few exceptions (Feven, Melinda Wrede, Remedeeh) Acts that have had some international success include LE SINNER, Rebstar, Looptroop Bladee, Ecco2k, Thaiboy Digital, Yung Lean, Max Peezay, and Million Stylez.

== Non-commercial hip-hop ==
There have always been elements within the Swedish hip-hop scene that has reacted against the commercial aspects of the music industry and have tried to find alternative distribution and marketing channels for the music. The Internet has had a significant impact in how media is communicated, and through various online communities people without record deals have also been able to find audiences for their music. Examples of such communities that are centered around Swedish hip-hop are Frizon and Whoa.nu.

== Graffiti culture ==
Graffiti is, to a large extent, seen as an art form belonging to hip-hop. In the early 1980s, the American films Style Wars, Wild Style and Beat Street would have a great impact and influence many would-be artists, as would the Swedish cult classic Stockholmsnatt a few years later. The first graffiti artists in the Stockholm area had names such as Disey, Ziggy, Razor, Merley (aka Liam Norberg), Puppet and Zappo.

In 2004, the rapper Promoe had a hit with the track "These Walls Don't Lie", recorded and mixed by Soundism, which dealt with the Swedish graffiti culture, and the dangers of creating illegal art at difficult locations.

== See also ==
- Music of Sweden
- European hip-hop#Sweden
- List of Swedish hip-hop musicians
- Category:Swedish hip-hop musicians
- Drain Gang

== Books ==
- Almqvist, Björn (2005). Writers United. Historien om WUFC (1st ed.). Dokument förlag. ISBN 978-91-973981-3-8. (About Writers United Football Club, a graffiti crew from Nacka)
- Andersson, Per (2005). Medan Svensson åt plankstek (1st ed.). Norstedts. ISBN 978-91-1-301241-4. (About a group of graffiti artists from the suburbs of Stockholm)
- Jacobson, Malcolm (2000). Dom kallar oss klottrare (1st ed.). Dokument förlag. ISBN 978-91-630-8611-3. (Interviews and photographs from the Swedish graffiti scene)
- Jacobson, Malcolm; Tobias Barenthin Lindblad (2006). Overground. 2 (1st ed.). Dokument förlag. ISBN 978-91-973981-4-5. (Interviews with eight Scandinavian graffiti masters)
- Ludvigsson, Emma; Jonas Frank (2005). The Latin Kings portafolio (1st ed.). Wahlström & Widstrand. ISBN 978-91-46-21140-2. (A biography)
- Palmgren, Johan; Oskar Ponnert; Karolina Ramqvist (2004). Shoot! (1st ed.). Gidappa Förlag. ISBN 978-91-631-5630-4. (A collection of photos of the greatest hip-hop acts between 1996–2004)
- Sernhede, Ove (2007). AlieNation is my nation (1st ed.). Ordfront förlag AB. ISBN 978-91-7037-323-7. (About the hip-hop culture in Gothenburg)
- Strage, Fredrik (2001). Mikrofonkåt (1st ed.). Bokförlaget Atlas KB. ISBN 978-91-89044-89-0. (Facts and rumors about most of the Swedish hip-hop artists)
- Sännås, Per-Olof (1996). Graffiti : ett gäng hip hopare och deras konst (2nd ed.). Action bild. ISBN 91-7970-777-7. (About the Swedish graffiti culture)
