= Linda Pira =

Swedish female rapper

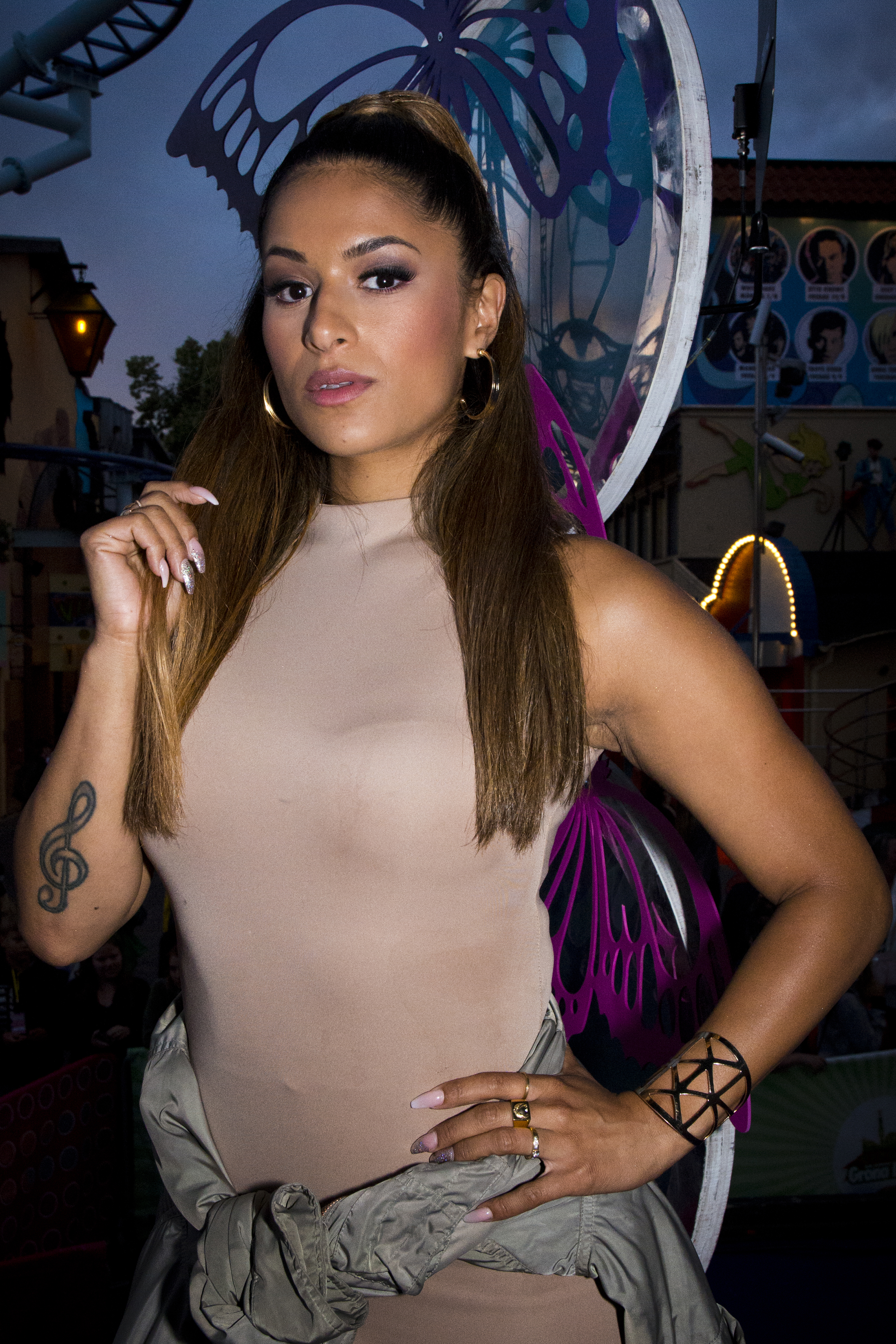
- Linda Pira at Sommarkrysset 2016

Background information
- Birth name: Linda Pira
- Born: 25 August 1985 (age 39); Colombia
- Occupation: Rapper
- Years active: 2006–present
- Labels: Redline Records

Linda Marie Pira Giraldo (born 25 August 1985) is a Swedish rapper. She grew up in Hässelby in western Stockholm where she still resides.

Her parents, Kjell, a bar owner, and Zulima lived in Colombia. After Linda was born, they all moved to Sweden. Linda Pira went to high school at Fryshuset, where she studied music with artists such as Lykke Li, Näääk and Sebastian Stakset.

Pira was featured on rapper Stor's single "Rom och Kush" in the fall of 2012. During the summer of 2013, she released the double single "Bang Bang" / "Bäng Bäng". The Salazar Brothers produced her first EP, Matriarken, in late 2013. The EP was released under Redline Records label.

During 2013, SVT play broadcast the documentary Linda Pira – Som du inte visste. The six-episode documentary series was produced by Anneli Kustfält and Agnes-Lo Åkerlind. Åkerlind described Pira with the words "She is thoughtful and rational, political and at the same time she is not, a person who seeks adrenaline kicks and chill. She is a role model but is still doing her own thing. Also she works in an industry where the female sex is underrepresented and that is interesting to me.".

In 2014, Linda Pira received an award at Grammis Awards in the category "Best Newcomer 2013". and on 2 March 2014 the remix of "Knäpper mina fingrar" entered Digilistan being an all-female collective effort by Linda Pira, Rawda, Vanessa Falk, Julia Spada, Joy, Sep, Rosh, Kumba and Cleo. On 19 June 2014, she released the songs "Överlever allt", and "Sho katt" featuring Dani M. She participated in Stjärnornas stjärna broadcast on TV4.

== Awards ==
- 2014: Newcomer of the year during Grammis Awards 2014
- 2014: Live performance of the year during Award Awards

== Discography ==
=== Albums ===
Title	Year	Peak positions
Title	Year	SWE
Legendarisk	2019	26

=== EPs ===
- 2013: Matriarken

=== Singles ===
Year	Single	Peak positions	Certification
Year	Single	SWE	Certification
2015	"Visa vid vindens ängar"	47	
2016	"Ey gäri" (featuring Molly Sandén)	90	
2018	"Vem e ni!?"	— (Note: "Vem e ni!?" did not enter the Sverigetopplistan, but peaked at number six on the Swedish Heatseeker chart.)	
2019	"Gang Gang" (featuring Masse)	86	
2019	"Plástico" (with Dani M)	52	
2020	"Bonita" (with Stress)	— (Note: "Bonita" did not enter the Swedish Singellista Chart, but peaked at number 13 on the Swedish Heatseeker Chart.)	

Featured on

Year	Single	Peak positions	Certification
Year	Single	SWE	Certification
2006	"Ain't Good Enough (Bonita Señorita)" (Bes feat. Linda Pira)	26	
