= Stor =

Swedish rapper

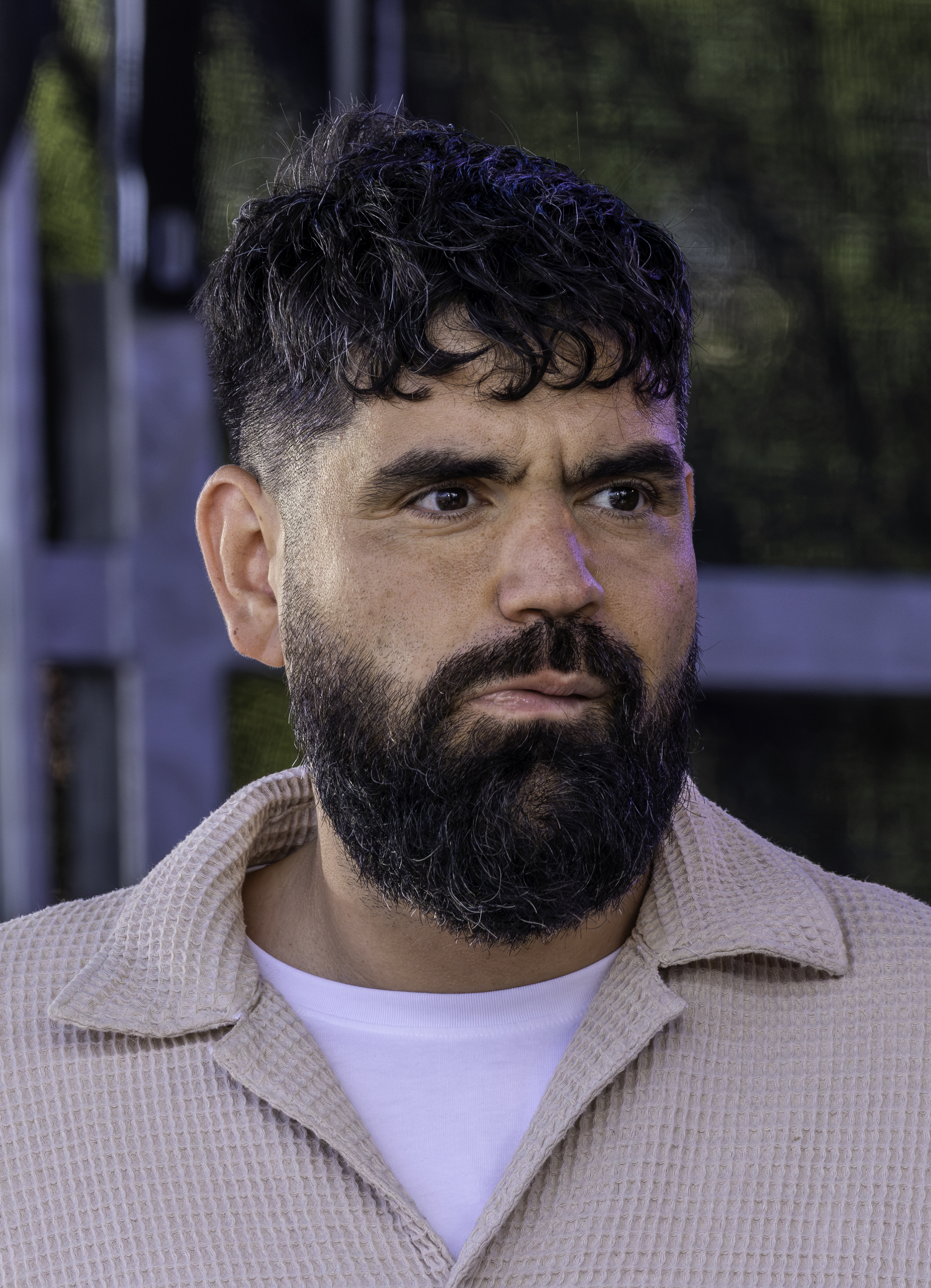
- Stor (2026)

Background information
- Born: Ulises Infante Azocar; 8 April 1987 (age 39); Huddinge, Sweden
- Genre: Hip hop
- Occupations: Rapper; singer

Ulises Infante Azocar (born 8 April 1987), better known as Stor, is a Swedish rapper. Azocar grew up in Huddinge outside of Stockholm with his mother and siblings. His parents are Chilean who fled to Sweden in 1976. his father is the Chilean poet Sergio Infante and his grandfather is the poet Rubén Azócar. Azocar is a member of the hiphop music collective AYLA which consists of Azocar Carlito, Mohammed Ali and their producer Mack Beats.

== Career ==
Azocar released his debut music album in 2009 called Nya skolans ledare, for which he was awarded a P3 Guld award in the category Hiphop/soul of the Year. On the album he collaborates with rapper Petter, Dan Jah, Promoe and Adam Tensta. Azocar collaborates with Petter on his album En räddare i nöden (2010), where he and Petter performs on the single Vem är Stor?.

Besides Nya skolans ledare Azocar has also released the mixtape called Dikter ifrån bikten, amongst other there are the song Där ni ser mig. Azocar has released the song 2 Lurar with the music group Teddybears (2009). On 30 November 2010, the song Stationen was released by Ison & Fille where Azocar participates. On 9 November 2018 he released the music single Rom & Kush with rapper Linda Pira. On 3 May 2013, Azocar released the album Shere Khan XIII where Linda Pira, Aki and Dani M also collaborates.

On 28 May 2015, he released the song Swish along with Linda Pira, Gee Dixon & Bamma B.

On 19 May 2016, the musicvideo to the song Svartskallar was put on YouTube. The video makes references to historical slave roles were the actors Helena af Sandeberg and Jonas Malmsjö plays the roles of slaves and where Linda Pira, Cherrie, Fanny Jernström, Ali Sabriye and Teddy Vidal plays upper-class people. On 18 November 2016, he and Seinabo Sey released the song Vägen hem together.

On 9 June 2017, he released his third music album called Under broarna, an album influenced by his experiences with the city of Stockholm and the Chilean poet Pablo Neruda. In 2018, he participated in the show Så mycket bättre along with several other Swedish singers, the show is broadcast on TV4.

== Discography ==
=== Albums ===
- Över Broarna (2023) – No. 7 Sweden

=== Singles ===
Title	Year	Peak chart positions	Album
Title	Year	SWE	Album
"Säga mig" (featuring Jireel)	2018	4	Non-album singles
"Elden" (featuring Dizzy and Manny Flaco)	2021	64	Non-album singles
"Stora blå" (with Thomas Stenström and Ison & Fille)	2023	31	Över Broarna
"Higher Calling" (with Miriam Bryant)	2026	— (Note: "Higher Calling" did not enter the Swedish Singellista Chart, but peaked at number 3 on the Swedish Heatseeker Chart.)	Non-album single
