= Näääk =

Swedish rapper (born 1983)

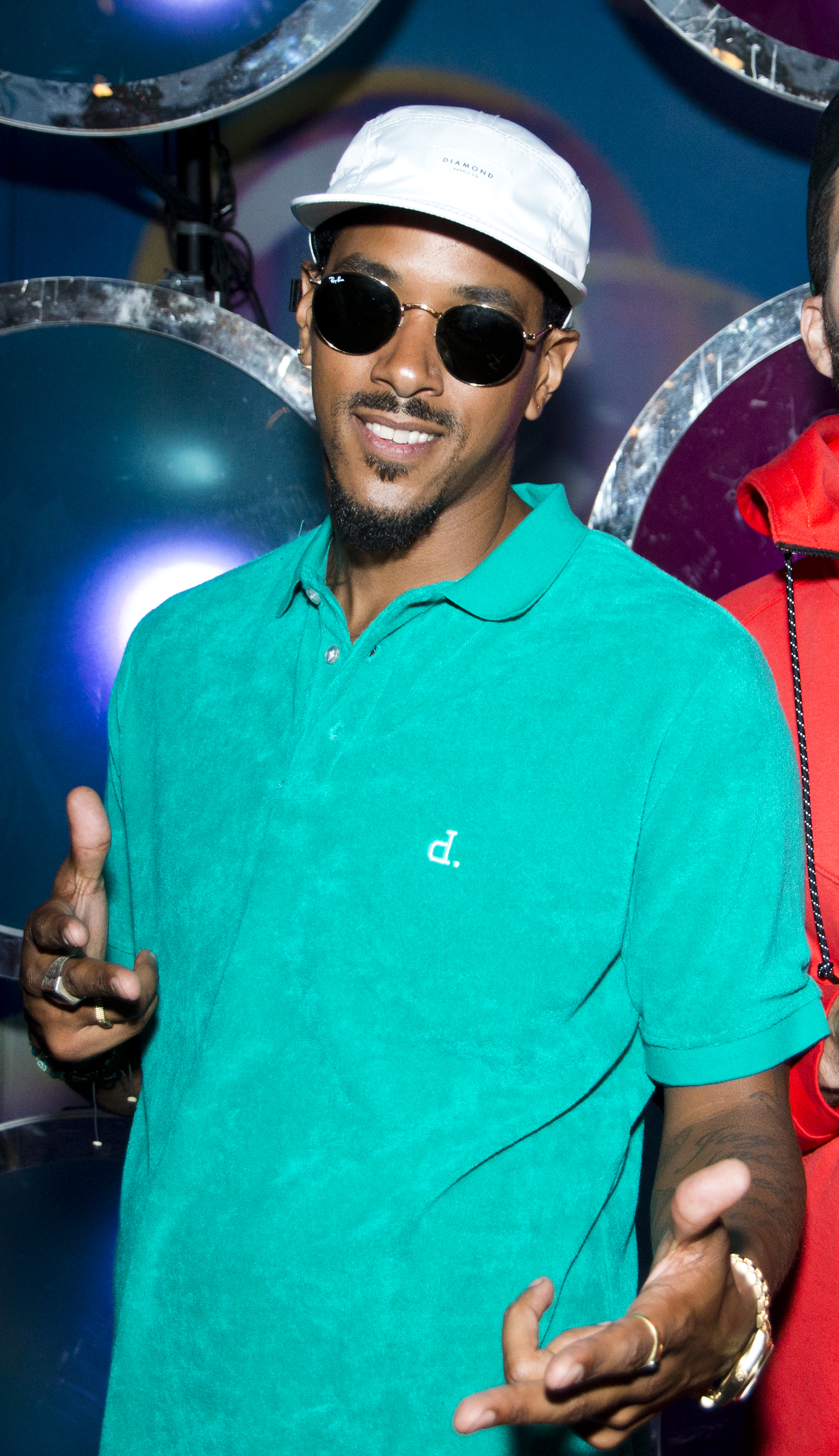
- Näääk

Background information
- Born: Matar Henrikki Samba; 1983 (age 42–43); Rinkeby, Stockholm
- Genres: Funk; hip hop
- Occupations: Singer; rapper; songwriter
- Instruments: Vocals
- Years active: 2000–present
- Label: Safe House

Matar Henrikki Samba, better known as Näääk (born 1983), is a Swedish rapper and singer.

== Biography ==
Näääk was born and raised in the Stockholm suburb Rinkeby to a Finnish mother and a Gambian father. He moved to Gullmarsplan when he started high school. His grandmother is from Rovaniemi.

In 2009, Näääk released his debut album Näääk Vem? ("Näääk Who?") which he recorded with Safe House Studios during 2008. The debut was nominated for the prize of "This Years Rap Album" on the Swedish radio station Sveriges Radio P3's "Gold Awards", but did not win anything. The latest album, Mannen utan mask ("The man without mask"), was released on 26 September 2012.

When Näääk Vem? was released, the rap duo Näääk & Nimo from Stockholm was formed. Jetlag and Blåser min rök ("Blow my smoke") are two singles that Näääk released with Nimo as the guest rapper.

== Personal life ==
In a 2010 interview in 2010, Näääk said he was single and did not have any desire of being in a relationship.

He said he got his name, Näääk, from a friend who tried to spell the word "Negro" in Finnish, but misspelled it and wrote "N-Ä-Ä-Ä-K-E-R-R-I" instead of the right spelling; "N-E-E-K-E-R-I".

== Discography ==
=== Albums ===
- Näääk Vem? (21 October 2009)
- Mannen utan mask (26 September 2012)

=== Singles ===
- 2007: "Mina Gangsters"
- 2012: "Jetlag"

Title	Year	Peak chart positions	Album
Title	Year	SWE	Album
"Dela min tid" (featuring Jireel)	2019	87	Non-album single
"Cali" (Näääk featuring Fricky, Denz)	2019	18	Non-album single

=== Other and featured singles ===
Title	Year	Peak chart positions	Album
Title	Year	SWE	Album
"Lyckliga gatan" (credited to Näääk & Nimo featuring Kaliffa)	2015	22	Non-album single
"Jag hade en gång en båt" (Allyawan feat. Näääk)	2015	2	Non-album single
