= List of number-one singles of the 2020s (Sweden) =

List of number-one singles of the 2020s in Sweden

This is a list of number-one singles during the 2020s according to the Sverigetopplistan, a chart that ranks the best-performing singles of Sweden.

== 2020 ==
List of number-one songs of 2020
Issue date	Title	Artist(s)
3 January	"XO"	Yasin and Dree Low
10 January	"Blinding Lights"	The Weeknd
17 January	"Mitten av september"	Hov1
24 January	"Svag"	Victor Leksell
31 January	"Svag"	Victor Leksell
7 February	"Svag"	Victor Leksell
14 February	"Svag"	Victor Leksell
21 February	"Svag"	Victor Leksell
28 February	"Svag"	Victor Leksell
6 March	"Svag"	Victor Leksell
13 March	"Move"	The Mamas
20 March	"Svag"	Victor Leksell
27 March	"Blinding Lights"	The Weeknd
3 April	"Blinding Lights"	The Weeknd
10 April	"Blinding Lights"	The Weeknd
17 April	"Blinding Lights"	The Weeknd
24 April	"Blinding Lights"	The Weeknd
1 May	"Blinding Lights"	The Weeknd
8 May	"Svag"	Victor Leksell
15 May	"Blinding Lights"	The Weeknd
22 May	"Blinding Lights"	The Weeknd
29 May	"Blinding Lights"	The Weeknd
5 June	"Svag"	Victor Leksell
12 June	"Svag"	Victor Leksell
19 June	"Svag"	Victor Leksell
26 June	"Svag"	Victor Leksell
3 July	"Savage Love (Laxed – Siren Beat)"	Jawsh 685 and Jason Derulo
10 July	"Savage Love (Laxed – Siren Beat)"	Jawsh 685 and Jason Derulo
17 July	"Savage Love (Laxed – Siren Beat)"	Jawsh 685 and Jason Derulo
24 July	"Savage Love (Laxed – Siren Beat)"	Jawsh 685 and Jason Derulo
31 July	"Savage Love (Laxed – Siren Beat)"	Jawsh 685 and Jason Derulo
7 August	"Savage Love (Laxed – Siren Beat)"	Jawsh 685 and Jason Derulo
14 August	"Savage Love (Laxed – Siren Beat)"	Jawsh 685 and Jason Derulo
21 August	"Savage Love (Laxed – Siren Beat)"	Jawsh 685 and Jason Derulo
28 August	"Svag"	Victor Leksell
4 September	"Mood"	24kGoldn featuring Iann Dior
11 September	"Mood"	24kGoldn featuring Iann Dior
18 September	"Mood"	24kGoldn featuring Iann Dior
25 September	"Mood"	24kGoldn featuring Iann Dior
2 October	"Mood"	24kGoldn featuring Iann Dior
9 October	"Mood"	24kGoldn featuring Iann Dior
16 October	"Mood"	24kGoldn featuring Iann Dior
23 October	"Mood"	24kGoldn featuring Iann Dior
30 October	"Mood"	24kGoldn featuring Iann Dior
6 November	"Långsamt farväl"	Benjamin Ingrosso
13 November	"Mood"	24KGoldn featuring Iann Dior
20 November	"Ge upp igen"	Miriam Bryant and Yasin
27 November	"Ge upp igen"	Miriam Bryant and Yasin
4 December	"Ge upp igen"	Miriam Bryant and Yasin
11 December	"Ge upp igen"	Miriam Bryant and Yasin
18 December	"Du måste finnas"	Newkid
25 December	"All I Want for Christmas Is You"	Mariah Carey

== 2021 ==
List of number-one songs of 2021
Issue date	Title	Artist(s)
1 January	"Du måste finnas"	Newkid
8 January	"Du måste finnas"	Newkid
15 January	"Du måste finnas"	Newkid
22 January	"Drivers License"	Olivia Rodrigo
29 January	"Drivers License"	Olivia Rodrigo
5 February	"Barn av vår tid"	Hov1
12 February	"Barn av vår tid"	Hov1
19 February	"Tystnar i luren"	Miriam Bryant and Victor Leksell
26 February	"Tystnar i luren"	Miriam Bryant and Victor Leksell
5 March	"Tystnar i luren"	Miriam Bryant and Victor Leksell
12 March	"Gamora"	Hov1 featuring Einár
19 March	"Voices"	Tusse
26 March	"Voices"	Tusse
2 April	"Gamora"	Hov1 featuring Einár
9 April	"Gamora"	Hov1 featuring Einár
16 April	"Gamora"	Hov1 featuring Einár
23 April	"Gamora"	Hov1 featuring Einár
30 April	"Gamora"	Hov1 featuring Einár
7 May	"Tystnar i luren"	Miriam Bryant and Victor Leksell
14 May	"Tokken"	Hov1 featuring Dree Low
21 May	"Tokken"	Hov1 featuring Dree Low
28 May	"Zitti e buoni"	Måneskin
4 June	"Samma gamla vanliga"	A36
11 June	"Samma gamla vanliga"	A36
18 June	"Samma gamla vanliga"	A36
25 June	"Samma gamla vanliga"	A36
2 July	"Samma gamla vanliga"	A36
9 July	"Samma gamla vanliga"	A36
16 July	"Stay"	The Kid Laroi and Justin Bieber
23 July	"Flickorna i Båstad"	Hov1
30 July	"Stay"	The Kid Laroi and Justin Bieber
6 August	"Stay"	The Kid Laroi and Justin Bieber
13 August	"Stay"	The Kid Laroi and Justin Bieber
20 August	"Stay"	The Kid Laroi and Justin Bieber
27 August	"Stay"	The Kid Laroi and Justin Bieber
3 September	"Stay"	The Kid Laroi and Justin Bieber
10 September	"Don't Shut Me Down"	ABBA
17 September	"Stay"	The Kid Laroi and Justin Bieber
24 September	"Stay"	The Kid Laroi and Justin Bieber
1 October	"Stay"	The Kid Laroi and Justin Bieber
8 October	"Räkna dagar"	Hov1
15 October	"Shivers"	Ed Sheeran
22 October	"Easy on Me"	Adele
29 October	"Dansa"	Einár and Adaam
5 November	"Easy on Me"	Adele
12 November	"Easy on Me"	Adele
19 November	"Easy on Me"	Adele
26 November	"Easy on Me"	Adele
3 December	"All I Want for Christmas Is You"	Mariah Carey
10 December	"All I Want for Christmas Is You"	Mariah Carey
17 December	"All I Want for Christmas Is You"	Mariah Carey
24 December	"Last Christmas"	Wham!
31 December	"Last Christmas"	Wham!

== 2022 ==
List of number-one songs of 2022
Issue date	Title	Artist(s)
7 January	"ABCDEFU"	Gayle
14 January	"Som dom"	Sarettii
21 January	"Som dom"	Sarettii
28 January	"30 personer"	Hov1 and Elias Hurtig
4 February	"Länge leve vi"	23
11 February	"Länge leve vi"	23
18 February	"Länge leve vi"	23
25 February	"Mano"	Jireel
4 March	"Mano"	Jireel
11 March	"Run to the Hills"	Klara Hammarström
18 March	"Hold Me Closer"	Cornelia Jakobs
25 March	"Hold Me Closer"	Cornelia Jakobs
1 April	"Hold Me Closer"	Cornelia Jakobs
8 April	"As It Was"	Harry Styles
15 April	"Ut med allt"	Björn Holmgren
22 April	"Fakka ur"	Loam and Adaam
29 April	"Fakka ur"	Loam and Adaam
6 May	"Fakka ur"	Loam and Adaam
13 May	"Matador"	Sarettii
20 May	"2step"	Ed Sheeran featuring 1.Cuz
27 May	"Komplicerat"	Ant Wan
3 June	"2step"	Ed Sheeran featuring 1.Cuz
10 June	"Running Up That Hill (A Deal with God)"	Kate Bush
17 June	"Lilla Nisse"	Einár
24 June	"Missförstått"	Bell
1 July	"Kan inte gå"	Bolaget
8 July	"Kan inte gå"	Bolaget
15 July	"Kan inte gå"	Bolaget
22 July	"Kan inte gå"	Bolaget
29 July	"Din låt"	Victor Leksell and Einár
5 August	"Din låt"	Victor Leksell and Einár
12 August	"Din låt"	Victor Leksell and Einár
19 August	"Din låt"	Victor Leksell and Einár
26 August	"Din låt"	Victor Leksell and Einár
2 September	"Din låt"	Victor Leksell and Einár
9 September	"Din låt"	Victor Leksell and Einár
16 September	"Din låt"	Victor Leksell and Einár
23 September	"Sevilla"	Thrife
30 September	"I'm Good (Blue)"	David Guetta and Bebe Rexha
7 October	"I'm Good (Blue)"	David Guetta and Bebe Rexha
14 October	"I'm Good (Blue)"	David Guetta and Bebe Rexha
21 October	"Dum"	Ant Wan
28 October	"I'm Good (Blue)"	David Guetta and Bebe Rexha
4 November	"Ingen annan rör mig som du"	Molly Hammar
11 November	"Ingen annan rör mig som du"	Molly Hammar
18 November	"Ingen annan rör mig som du"	Molly Hammar
25 November	"Ingen annan rör mig som du"	Molly Hammar
2 December	"All I Want for Christmas Is You"	Mariah Carey
9 December	"All I Want for Christmas Is You"	Mariah Carey
16 December	"All I Want for Christmas Is You"	Mariah Carey
23 December	"Last Christmas"	Wham!
30 December	"Last Christmas"	Wham!

== 2023 ==
List of number-one songs of 2023
Issue date	Title	Artist(s)
6 January	"Rid mig som en dalahäst"	Rasmus Gozzi and Fröken Snusk
13 January	"Nätterna i Göteborg"	Victor Leksell
20 January	"Flowers"	Miley Cyrus
27 January	"Flowers"	Miley Cyrus
3 February	"Du & jag"	Einár
10 February	"Du & jag"	Einár
17 February	"Flowers"	Miley Cyrus
24 February	"Flowers"	Miley Cyrus
3 March	"Tattoo"	Loreen
10 March	"Tattoo"	Loreen
17 March	"Tattoo"	Loreen
24 March	"Tattoo"	Loreen
31 March	"Lilla B"	Hov1
7 April	"Lilla B"	Hov1
14 April	"Lilla B"	Hov1
21 April	"Ikväll igen"	Bolaget
28 April	"Ikväll igen"	Bolaget
5 May	"Ikväll igen"	Bolaget
12 May	"Ikväll igen"	Bolaget
19 May	"Cha Cha Cha"	Käärijä
26 May	"Grät"	Hov1
2 June	"Grät"	Hov1
9 June	"Ikväll igen"	Bolaget
16 June	"Vill va med dig"	Einár
23 June	"Ikväll igen"	Bolaget
30 June	"Ikväll igen"	Bolaget
7 July	"Ikväll igen"	Bolaget
14 July	"Ikväll igen"	Bolaget
21 July	"Ikväll igen"	Bolaget
28 July	"Ikväll igen"	Bolaget
4 August	"Ikväll igen"	Bolaget
11 August	"Ikväll igen"	Bolaget
18 August	"Ikväll igen"	Bolaget
25 August	"Soldat"	VC Barre, Pablo Paz and Takenoelz
1 September	"Prada"	Cassö, Raye and D-Block Europe
8 September	"Prada"	Cassö, Raye and D-Block Europe
15 September	"Saudade"	Hov1 and Håkan Hellström
22 September	"Farväl"	Bolaget
29 September	"Dans från dig"	Einár, Sara Kurt and Le Winter
6 October	"Go"	Ant Wan
13 October	"Automatic"	C.Gambino
20 October	"Automatic"	C.Gambino
27 October	"Det kommer aldrig va över för mig"	Veronica Maggio
3 November	"Det kommer aldrig va över för mig"	Veronica Maggio
10 November	"Si No Estás"	Íñigo Quintero
17 November	"Hjärta"	B.Baby
24 November	"Bättre nu (The Wedding)"	Peg Parnevik
1 December	"Last Christmas"	Wham!
8 December	"Last Christmas"	Wham!
15 December	"Last Christmas"	Wham!
22 December	"Last Christmas"	Wham!
29 December	"Last Christmas"	Wham!

== 2024 ==
List of number-one songs of 2024
Issue date	Title	Artist(s)
5 January	"Låt mig va"	Bolaget and Victor Leksell
12 January	"Svar"	C.Gambino
19 January	"Svar"	C.Gambino
26 January	"Lean & Sprite"	Owen and Asme
2 February	"Kite"	Benjamin Ingrosso
9 February	"Lean & Sprite"	Owen and Asme
16 February	"Lean & Sprite"	Owen and Asme
23 February	"Unga & fria"	Fröken Snusk
1 March	"Unga & fria"	Fröken Snusk
8 March	"Unga & fria"	Fröken Snusk
15 March	"Unforgettable"	Marcus & Martinus
22 March	"Que Sera"	Medina
29 March	"Vem fan e du?"	Hooja and Miriam Bryant
5 April	"Vem fan e du?"	Hooja and Miriam Bryant
12 April	"Vem fan e du?"	Hooja and Miriam Bryant
19 April	"Vem fan e du?"	Hooja and Miriam Bryant
26 April	"I Like the Way You Kiss Me"	Artemas
3 May	"A Bar Song (Tipsy)"	Shaboozey
10 May	"A Bar Song (Tipsy)"	Shaboozey
17 May	"A Bar Song (Tipsy)"	Shaboozey
24 May	"A Bar Song (Tipsy)"	Shaboozey
31 May	"A Bar Song (Tipsy)"	Shaboozey
7 June	"A Bar Song (Tipsy)"	Shaboozey
14 June	"Sista gång"	C.Gambino
21 June	"Look Who's Laughing Now"	Benjamin Ingrosso
28 June	"Look Who's Laughing Now"	Benjamin Ingrosso
5 July	"A Bar Song (Tipsy)"	Shaboozey
12 July	"A Bar Song (Tipsy)"	Shaboozey
19 July	"A Bar Song (Tipsy)"	Shaboozey
26 July	"A Bar Song (Tipsy)"	Shaboozey
2 August	"A Bar Song (Tipsy)"	Shaboozey
9 August	"A Bar Song (Tipsy)"	Shaboozey
16 August	"Regnblöta skor"	Miriam Bryant
23 August	"Regnblöta skor"	Miriam Bryant
30 August	"Regnblöta skor"	Miriam Bryant
6 September	"I Might"	Sarettii
13 September	"I Might"	Sarettii
20 September	"I Might"	Sarettii
27 September	"Lost and Found"	Molly Sandén and Victor Leksell
4 October	"Lost and Found"	Molly Sandén and Victor Leksell
11 October	"Lost and Found"	Molly Sandén and Victor Leksell
18 October	"Cecilia Lind"	Yasin
25 October	"Cecilia Lind"	Yasin
1 November	"Cecilia Lind"	Yasin
8 November	"Lost and Found"	Molly Sandén and Victor Leksell
15 November	"Lost and Found"	Molly Sandén and Victor Leksell
22 November	"Lost and Found"	Molly Sandén and Victor Leksell
29 November	"Last Christmas"	Wham!
6 December	"Last Christmas"	Wham!
13 December	"Last Christmas"	Wham!
20 December	"Last Christmas"	Wham!
27 December	"Last Christmas"	Wham!

== 2025 ==
List of number-one songs of 2025
Issue date	Title	Artist(s)
3 January	"Längesen"	Bolaget
10 January	"Längesen"	Bolaget
17 January	"Min Bitch"	Yasin
24 January	"Lucky Luciano"	23
31 January	"Apt."	Rosé and Bruno Mars
7 February	"Apt."	Rosé and Bruno Mars
14 February	"Bullerbyn är död"	Simon Superti
21 February	"On and On and On"	Klara Hammarström
28 February	"Bara bada bastu"	KAJ
7 March	"Bara bada bastu"	KAJ
14 March	"Bara bada bastu"	KAJ
21 March	"Bara bada bastu"	KAJ
28 March	"Bara bada bastu"	KAJ
4 April	"Bara bada bastu"	KAJ
11 April	"Bara bada bastu"	KAJ
18 April	"Bara bada bastu"	KAJ
25 April	"Bara bada bastu"	KAJ
2 May	"Bara bada bastu"	KAJ
9 May	"Bara bada bastu"	KAJ
16 May	"Bara bada bastu"	KAJ
23 May	"Bara bada bastu"	KAJ
30 May	"Tusen spänn"	Tjuvjakt and Fanny Avonne
6 June	"Tusen spänn"	Tjuvjakt and Fanny Avonne
13 June	"Tusen spänn"	Tjuvjakt and Fanny Avonne
20 June	"Tusen spänn"	Tjuvjakt and Fanny Avonne
27 June	"Tusen spänn"	Tjuvjakt and Fanny Avonne
4 July	"Tusen spänn"	Tjuvjakt and Fanny Avonne
11 July	"Tusen spänn"	Tjuvjakt and Fanny Avonne
18 July	"Tusen spänn"	Tjuvjakt and Fanny Avonne
25 July	"Tusen spänn"	Tjuvjakt and Fanny Avonne
1 August	"Golden"	Huntrix (Ejae, Audrey Nuna and Rei Ami)
8 August	"Golden"	Huntrix (Ejae, Audrey Nuna and Rei Ami)
15 August	"Golden"	Huntrix (Ejae, Audrey Nuna and Rei Ami)
22 August	"Golden"	Huntrix (Ejae, Audrey Nuna and Rei Ami)
29 August	"Golden"	Huntrix (Ejae, Audrey Nuna and Rei Ami)
5 September	"Golden"	Huntrix (Ejae, Audrey Nuna and Rei Ami)
12 September	"Golden"	Huntrix (Ejae, Audrey Nuna and Rei Ami)
19 September	"Golden"	Huntrix (Ejae, Audrey Nuna and Rei Ami)
26 September	"Golden"	Huntrix (Ejae, Audrey Nuna and Rei Ami)
3 October	"Golden"	Huntrix (Ejae, Audrey Nuna and Rei Ami)
10 October	"The Fate of Ophelia"	Taylor Swift
17 October	"The Fate of Ophelia"	Taylor Swift
24 October	"Golden"	Huntrix (Ejae, Audrey Nuna and Rei Ami)
31 October	"Golden"	Huntrix (Ejae, Audrey Nuna and Rei Ami)
7 November	"Golden"	Huntrix (Ejae, Audrey Nuna and Rei Ami)
14 November	"The Fate of Ophelia"	Taylor Swift
21 November	"The Fate of Ophelia"	Taylor Swift
28 November	"The Fate of Ophelia"	Taylor Swift
5 December	"Last Christmas"	Wham!
12 December	"Last Christmas"	Wham!
19 December	"Last Christmas"	Wham!
26 December	"Last Christmas"	Wham!

== 2026 ==
List of number-one songs of 2026
Issue date	Title	Artist(s)
2 January	"The Fate of Ophelia"	Taylor Swift
9 January	"Djurens vaggvisa"	Humlan Djojj and Josefine Götestam
16 January	"End of Beginning"	Djo
23 January	"Lush Life"	Zara Larsson
30 January	"Lush Life"	Zara Larsson
6 February	"Iconic"	A-Teens
13 February	"My System"	Felicia
20 February	"My System"	Felicia
27 February	"My System"	Felicia
6 March	"My System"	Felicia
13 March	"My System"	Felicia
20 March	"My System"	Felicia
27 March	"My System"	Felicia
3 April	"My System"	Felicia
10 April	"My System"	Felicia
17 April	"My System"	Felicia
24 April	"Beauty and a Beat"	Justin Bieber featuring Nicki Minaj
1 May	"Beauty and a Beat"	Justin Bieber featuring Nicki Minaj
8 May	"Djurens vaggvisa"	Humlan Djojj and Josefine Götestam
15 May	"Djurens vaggvisa"	Humlan Djojj and Josefine Götestam
22 May	"Bangaranga"	Dara
29 May	"Bangaranga"	Dara
5 June	"När vi gräver guld i USA"	Tjuvjakt, Simon Strömstedt and Julia Glenmark
12 June	"Det ligger nåt i luften"	Bolaget
19 June	"Det ligger nåt i luften"	Bolaget
26 June	"Det ligger nåt i luften"	Bolaget
3 July	"Det ligger nåt i luften"	Bolaget
10 July	"Dai Dai"	Shakira and Burna Boy
17 July	"Dai Dai"	Shakira and Burna Boy
24 July	"Dai Dai"	Shakira and Burna Boy
31 July	"Dai Dai"	Shakira and Burna Boy
7 August	"Dai Dai"	Shakira and Burna Boy
14 August	"Tänk om"	Victor Leksell and Molly Sandén
21 August	"Dai Dai"	Shakira and Burna Boy
28 August	"Dai Dai"	Shakira and Burna Boy
4 September	"Djurens vaggvisa"	Humlan Djojj and Josefine Götestam
11 September	"Om du frågar Nooshi"	Fröken Snusk, Rasmus Gozzi and Louise Andersson Bodin
18 September	"Om du frågar Nooshi"	Fröken Snusk, Rasmus Gozzi and Louise Andersson Bodin
25 September	"Djurens vaggvisa"	Humlan Djojj and Josefine Götestam
2 October	"Djurens vaggvisa"	Humlan Djojj and Josefine Götestam
9 October	"Djurens vaggvisa"	Humlan Djojj and Josefine Götestam
16 October	"Djurens vaggvisa"	Humlan Djojj and Josefine Götestam
23 October	"Djurens vaggvisa"	Humlan Djojj and Josefine Götestam
30 October	"Housewife"	Tate McRae
6 November	"Housewife"	Tate McRae
13 November	"Mayday"	Keisha
20 November	"Mayday"	Keisha
