= Masked Singer Sverige season 5 =

Masked Singer Sverige
- Season 5

Release
- Original network: TV4
- Original release: 28 March – 23 May 2025

Season chronology
- ← Previous; Season 4 Next → Season 6

The fifth season of the Swedish version of Masked Singer ran from 28 March 2025 to 23 May 2025 on TV4. The new panel members for this season were Carina Berg and Behrouz Badreh, who joined presenter David Hellenius and the other two panel members Måns Zelmerlöw and Pernilla Wahlgren.

In Week 7, Zelmerlöw was replaced as panel member by comedian Måns Möller due to Zelmerlöw's participation in Melodifestivalen 2025.

== Contestants ==
| Stage Name | Identity | Occupation | Episode | | | | | | | | |
| Stage Name | Identity | Occupation | 1 | 2 | 3 | 4 | 5 | 6 | 7 | 8 | 9 |
|---|---|---|---|---|---|---|---|---|---|---|---|
| Porslinsdockan "Porcelain Doll" | Lisa Ajax | Singer | WIN | | SAFE | | WIN | | WIN | WIN | WINNER |
| Racingräven "Racing Fox" | Peter Jöback | Singer | WIN | | SAFE | | SAFE | | WIN | RISK | RUNNER-UP |
| Sushin "Sushi" | Kishti Tomita | Singer | | RISK | | SAFE | | WIN | WIN | RISK | THIRD |
| Scengångaren "Stage Sloth" | Alexander Karim | Actor | | WIN | | SAFE | | SAFE | RISK | OUT | |
| Skogsjätten "Forest Giant" | Niklas Wikegård | Former ice hockey player | WIN | | SAFE | | RISK | | RISK | OUT | |
| Bläckfisken "Octopus" | IJustWantToBeCool | Comedy Trio | | WIN | | SAFE | | RISK | OUT | | |
| Glödlampan "Light Bulb" | Marie Serneholt | Singer | | RISK | | RISK | | OUT | | | |
| Majskolven "Corn on the Cob" | Mikael Sandström | Physician | RISK | | RISK | | OUT | | | | |
| Detektivugglan "Detective Owl" | Anis Don Demina | Rapper | | WIN | | OUT | | | | | |
| Fågelholken "Birdhouse" | Pia Johansson | Actress | RISK | | OUT | | | | | | |
| Schackdrottningen "Chess Queen" | Kajsa Bergqvist | High Jumper | | OUT | | | | | | | |
| Bacillen "Bacilli" | Sarah Sjöström | Swimmer | OUT | | | | | | | | |

== Episodes ==
=== Week 1 (28 March) ===
Performances on the first episode
| # | Stage name | Song | Result | |
|---|---|---|---|---|
| 1 | Racingräven | "Faith" by Stevie Wonder ft. Ariana Grande | WIN | |
| 2 | Bacillen | "17 År" by ADAAM ft. Takenoelz & Pablo Paz | RISK | |
| 3 | Fågelholken | "Danza Kuduro" by Don Omar | RISK | |
| 4 | Skogsjätten | "Forever Young" by Alphaville | WIN | |
| 5 | Majskolven | "Svag" by Victor Leksell | RISK | |
| 6 | Porslinsdockan | "Lose Control" by Teddy Swims | WIN | |
| Face-off details | | | Identity | Result |
| 1 | Bacillen | "Ikväll Igen" by Bolaget | Sarah Sjöström | OUT |
| 2 | Fågelholken | "Cotton Eye Joe" by Rednex | undisclosed | SAFE |

=== Week 2 (4 April) ===
Performances on the second episode
| # | Stage name | Song | Result | |
|---|---|---|---|---|
| 1 | Scengångaren | "Can't Stop the Feeling!" by Justin Timberlake | WIN | |
| 2 | Glödlampan | "Electric" by Leila K | RISK | |
| 3 | Schackdrottningen | "Give My Heart a Break" by Cazzi Opeia | RISK | |
| 4 | Detektivugglan | "When We Were Young" by Adele | WIN | |
| 5 | Sushin | "I'm in Love with a Monster" by Fifth Harmony | RISK | |
| 6 | Bläckfisken | "The Code" by Nemo | WIN | |
| Face-off details | | | Identity | Result |
| 1 | Schackdrottningen | "Genom eld och vatten" by Sarek | Kajsa Bergqvist | OUT |
| 2 | Sushin | "Firework" by Katy Perry | undisclosed | SAFE |

=== Week 3 (11 April) ===
Performances on the third episode
| # | Stage name | Song | Result | |
|---|---|---|---|---|
| 1 | Racingräven | "Can't Get You Out of My Head" by Kylie Minogue | SAFE | |
| 2 | Majskolven | "Your Man" By Josh Turner | RISK | |
| 3 | Porslinsdockan | "2 Be Loved (Am I Ready)" by Lizzo | SAFE | |
| 4 | Fågelholken | "Hello" By Lionel Richie | RISK | |
| 5 | Skogsjätten | "I'm Still Standing" by Elton John | SAFE | |
| Face-off details | | | Identity | Result |
| 1 | Majskolven | "Take Me Home, Country Roads" by John Denver | undisclosed | WIN |
| 2 | Fågelholken | "Y.M.C.A." by Village People | Pia Johansson | OUT |

=== Week 4 (18 April) ===
Performances on the fourth episode
| # | Stage name | Song | Result | |
|---|---|---|---|---|
| 1 | Detektivugglan | "Locked Out of Heaven" by Bruno Mars | RISK | |
| 2 | Scengångaren | "Inget stoppar oss nu" by Lucianoz | SAFE | |
| 3 | Sushin | "Husavik" by My Marianne | SAFE | |
| 4 | Glödlampan | "Unga & fria" by Fröken Snusk | RISK | |
| 5 | Bläckfisken | "Bye Bye Bye" by NSYNC | SAFE | |
| Face-off details | | | Identity | Result |
| 1 | Detektivugglan | "I Will Survive" by Gloria Gaynor | Anis Don Demina | OUT |
| 2 | Glödlampan | "I Love It" by Icona Pop ft. Charli XCX | undisclosed | WIN |

=== Week 5 (25 April) ===
Performances on the fifth episode
| # | Stage name | Song | Result | |
|---|---|---|---|---|
| 1 | Skogsjätten | "Home" by Michael Bublé | RISK | |
| 2 | Majskolven | "Que Sera" by Medina | RISK | |
| 3 | Porslinsdockan | "Me Too" by Meghan Trainor | SAFE | |
| 4 | Racingräven | "Are You Gonna Go My Way" by Lenny Kravitz | SAFE | |
| Winner Face-off details | | | Result | |
| 1 | Porslinsdockan | "Fångad av en stormvind" by Carola | WIN | |
| 2 | Racingräven | "True Colors" by Cyndi Lauper | SAFE | |
| Face-off details | | | Identity | Result |
| 1 | Majskolven | "Rock Around the Clock"/"Blue Swede Shoes"/"Shake, Rattle and Roll" by Elvis Presley | Mikael Sandström | OUT |
| 2 | Skogsjätten | "When You're Looking Like That" by Westville | undisclosed | WIN |

=== Week 6 (2 May) ===
Performances on the sixth episode
| # | Stage name | Song | Result | |
|---|---|---|---|---|
| 1 | Scengångaren | "Stad I Ljus" by Tommy Körberg | SAFE | |
| 2 | Glödlampan | "Conga" by Gloria Estefan and Miami Sound Machine | RISK | |
| 3 | Sushin | "Unforgettable" by Marcus & Martinus | SAFE | |
| 4 | Bläckfisken | "9 to 5" by Dolly Parton | RISK | |
| Winner Face-off details | | | Result | |
| 1 | Scengångaren | "Finesse" by Bruno Mars | SAFE | |
| 2 | Sushin | "Defying Gravity" by Cynthia Erivo & Ariana Grande | WIN | |
| Face-off details | | | Identity | Result |
| 1 | Glödlampan | "Birds of a Feather" by Billie Eilish | Marie Serneholt | OUT |
| 2 | Bläckfisken | "What Makes You Beautiful" by One Direction | undisclosed | WIN |

=== Week 7 (9 May) ===
Performances on the seventh episode
| # | Stage name | Song | Result | |
|---|---|---|---|---|
| 1 | Porslinsdockan | "Oscar Winning Tears" by Raye | WIN | |
| 2 | Bläckfisken | "Michelangelo" by Björn Skifs | RISK | |
| 3 | Skogsjätten | "Moves like Jagger" by Maroon 5 | RISK | |
| 4 | Sushin | "APT." by Rosé & Bruno Mars | WIN | |
| 5 | Scengångaren | "Despacito" by Luis Fonsi & Daddy Yankee | RISK | |
| 6 | Racingräven | "Kite" by Benjamin Ingrosso | WIN | |
| Face-off details | | | Identity | Result |
| 1 | Scengångaren | "Scatman" by Scatman John | undisclosed | SAFE |
| 2 | Bläckfisken | "Guld och gröna skogar" by Hasse Andersson | IJustWantToBeCool | OUT |

=== Week 8 (16 May) ===
Performances on the eighth episode
| # | Stage name | Song | Duet Partner | Identity | Result |
|---|---|---|---|---|---|
| 1 | Skogsjätten | "Det är ju dej jag går och väntar på" by Lucianoz | Lucianoz | Niklas Wikegård | OUT |
| 2 | Racingräven | "Die With a Smile" by Lady Gaga & Bruno Mars | Margaux Flavet | undisclosed | RISK |
| 3 | Scengångaren | "Been Like This" by Meghan Trainor & T-Pain | Sarah Dawn Finer | undisclosed | RISK |
| 4 | Porslinsdockan | "The Prayer" by Andrea Bocelli & Celine Dion | Oscar Zia | undisclosed | WIN |
| 5 | Sushin | "Heroes" by Måns Zelmerlöw | Smash Into Pieces | undisclosed | RISK |
| Face-off details | | | | Identity | Result |
| 1 | Scengångaren | "Diggi-Loo Diggi-Ley" by Herreys | | Alexander Karim | OUT |
| 2 | Sushin | "Euphoria" by Loreen | | undisclosed | WIN |

=== Week 9 (23 May) ===
- Group number: "Let's Go Crazy" by Prince

Performances on the ninth episode
| # | Stage name | Song | Identity | Result |
|---|---|---|---|---|
| 1 | Racingräven | "Abracadabra" by Lady Gaga | undisclosed | SAFE |
| 2 | Sushin | "Lighter" by Galantis & Kygo | Kishti Tomita | THIRD |
| 3 | Porslinsdockan | "Symphony" by Clean Bandit ft. Zara Larsson | undisclosed | SAFE |
| Final Face-off details | | | Identity | Result |
| 1 | Racingräven | "Faith" by Stevie Wonder ft. Ariana Grande/"Are You Gonna Go My Way" by Lenny Kravitz/"Kite" by Benjamin Ingrosso | Peter Jöback | RUNNER-UP |
| 2 | Porslinsdockan | "2 Be Loved (Am I Ready)" by Lizzo/"Lose Control" by Teddy Swims/"Fångad av en stormvind" by Carola | Lisa Ajax | WINNER |
