= Epadunk =

Music genre

Epadunk, (Swedish pronunciation: [ˈêːpaˌdɵŋk]) or raggardunk, is a genre of music, often electronic, that has been associated with EPA tractors and A-tractors in Sweden since the early 2020s.

The lyrics often focus on themes like alcohol, sex and driving A-tractors (a car modified to have a low maximum speed that can be driven from 15 years of age and which is often associated with rural Sweden). The genre achieved significant commercial success in Sweden in 2022, with several songs among the most streamed on streaming services. The musical style can be viewed as part of a wider lifestyle and culture where young people driving EPA-tractors or A-tractors want to show off their vehicles with accompanying sound systems. In addition to electronic party music (including 1990s Eurodance), songs by artists such as Eddie Meduza and Lasse Stefanz have also been heard blaring from these vehicles.

Bolaget, Rasmus Gozzi, Fröken Snusk and Hooja are some of the names associated with the genre.

== Background ==
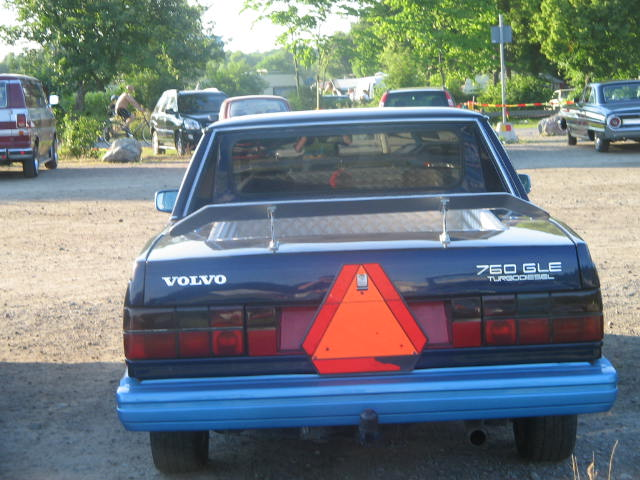
A-tractor, a slow-moving vehicle marked with a red triangle sign at the back, is often associated with the Epadunk style of music.

Epadunk has been described as a cross between electronic dance music (EDM) and könsrock, a Swedish term for a type of Swedish rock music characterized by humoristic and irreverent lyrics that often include sexually explicit lyrics, innuendos, toilet humor and positive descriptions of alcohol consumption and drunkenness. Among the precursors and sources of inspiration for the genre are the Norwegian genre russemusikk as well as the so-called "fjortisdunk" (a derogatory Swedish term used to describe dance music commonly listened to by young people in the 2000s, by artists like Basshunter). Dansband and hiphop music have also been cited as sources of inspiration.
