= Felicia Eriksson =

Swedish singer (born 2001)

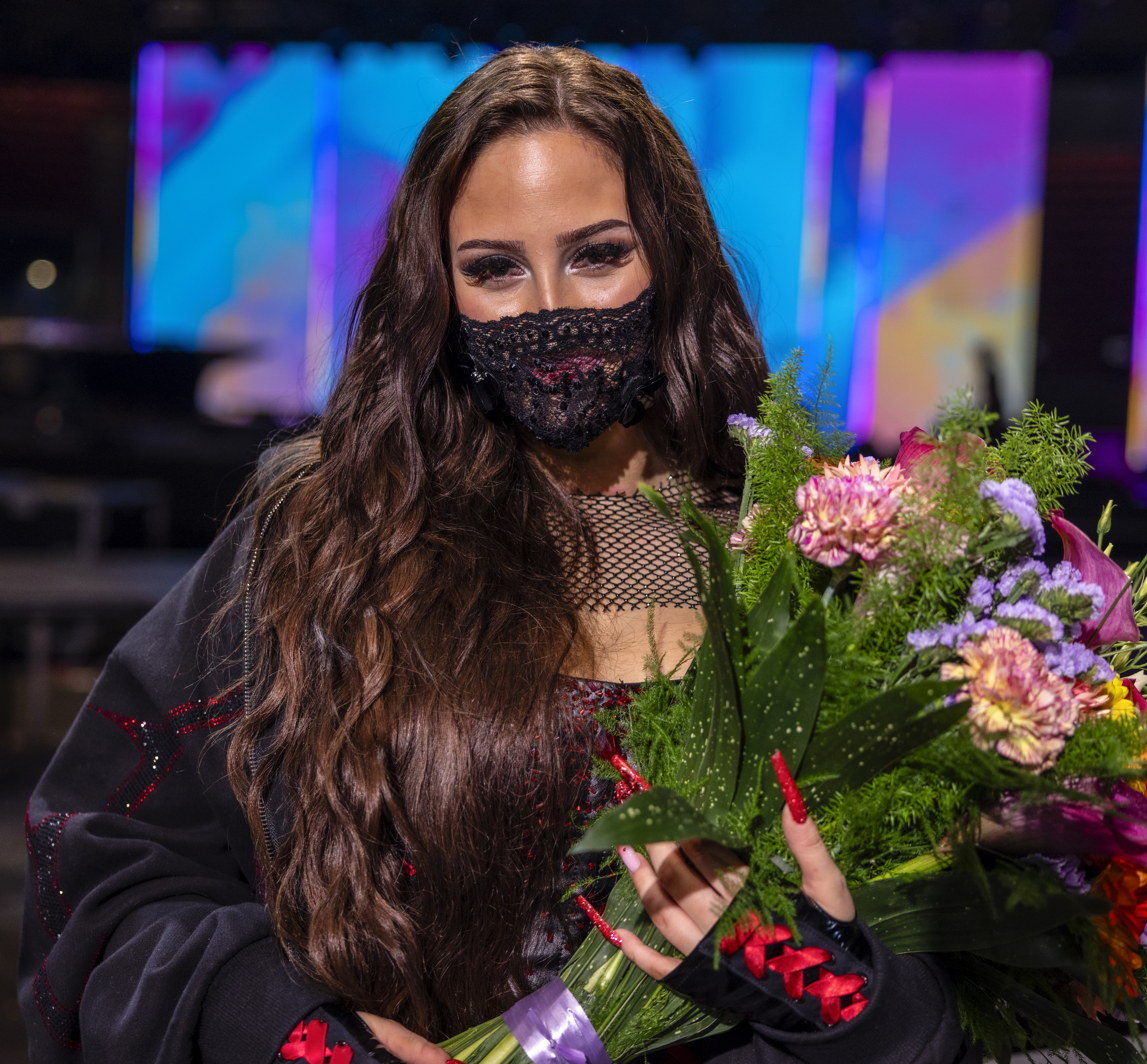

Background information
- Also known as: Felicia
- Born: Felicia Agneta Eriksson; 5 October 2001 (age 25); Tullinge, Sweden
- Genres: Pop; EDM
- Occupation: Singer
- Years active: 2022–present
- Label: Warner Music Group
- Formerly of: Fröken Snusk

Felicia Agneta Eriksson (born 5 October 2001), also known mononymously as Felicia (stylised in all caps), is a Swedish singer, first known as the original singer for the music project Fröken Snusk. She represented Sweden in the Eurovision Song Contest 2026 with the song "My System".

== Career ==
From 2022, Felicia Eriksson provided vocals and live performances for the music project Fröken Snusk, using a balaclava that concealed her identity.

As Fröken Snusk, she competed in Melodifestivalen 2024 with the song "Unga & fria", and later in spring of the same year she won the fourth season of Masked Singer Sverige which was broadcast on TV4. She also won the first season of the SVT reality competition Spelet. The season was filmed in early 2025 while Eriksson was still in the role but aired after she had left the Fröken Snusk project, and she was referred to as “the original Fröken Snusk”.

She was replaced in the role as Fröken Snusk in spring 2025 and subsequently launched a solo career, initially using the single-letter name F. Under this name, she collaborated with Darin on a reworked version of his single "Mimosa" and appeared as a guest artist during his 20th anniversary concert at Ullevi in July 2025.

Eriksson has continued to use a mask to partially cover her face, stating that it is primarily to avoid receiving hate comments about how she looks, acknowledging previous body shaming experiences during her time as Fröken Snusk, while also saying that she intends to remove the mask eventually.

In September 2025, Eriksson began publicly using her real name Felicia and released her debut solo single "Black Widow" after signing with Warner Music Sweden. Later that year, she performed in Musikhjälpen 2025.

She participated in Melodifestivalen 2026 with the song "My System", eventually winning with 161 points and earning her the right to represent Sweden in the Eurovision Song Contest 2026. In various interviews after winning Melodifestivalen, she criticised Israel's participation in Eurovision.

She qualified to the Eurovision final from Semi Final 1, in which she placed 20th with 51 points.

In June 2026, Eriksson released the single "Me Without U", a Spotify collaboration and reinterpretation of Edward Maya and Vika Jigulina’s 2009 hit song “Stereo Love”, and began her first tour under her own name, opening at Gröna Lund in Stockholm. Later that month, she performed at the season premiere of Allsång på Skansen. In August, Eriksson hosted an episode of Sommar i P1 on Sveriges Radio.

At the Rockbjörnen awards in September 2026, she won Breakthrough of the Year and was also nominated for Female Artist of the Year and Swedish Song of the Year for "My System". Later in September, DreamWorks’ animated film Forgotten Island was released in Sweden, with Eriksson providing one of the voices in the Swedish dub.

In October, she appeared as a guest performer on the first weekly live final of Idol 2026, and a week later, she won NRJ Sweden's Swedish Artist of the Year on the same day as the NRJ Music Awards.

On 30 October 2026, Eriksson released her debut album Popstar.

== Discography ==
=== Albums ===
List of studio albums, with selected details and chart positions
Title	Album details	Peaks
Title	Album details	SWE
Popstar	Released: 30 October 2026; Label: Warner Music Sweden; Formats: CD, digital download, streaming	6

=== Extended plays ===
List of extended plays, with selected details and chart positions
Title	Details	Peaks
Title	Details	SWE
My System	Released: 6 February 2026; Label: Warner Music Sweden; Formats: Digital download, streaming	7

=== Singles ===
Title	Year	Peak chart positions							Album or EP
Title	Year	SWE	AUT	FIN	GER	SWI	UK Dance	UK Sales	Album or EP
"Black Widow"	2025	14	—	—	—	—	—	—	My System (Note: "Black Widow", "Sugar High", "Hard" and "My System" are also included on the Popstar album.)
"Sugar High"	2025	— (Note: "Sugar High" did not enter the Swedish Singellista Chart, but peaked at number 2 on the Swedish Heatseeker Chart.)	—	—	—	—	—	—	My System
"HARD"	2026	—	—	—	—	—	—	—	My System
"My System"	2026	1	9	8	87	79	39	17	My System
"Me Without U" (with Edward Maya and Vika Jigulina)	2026	90	—	—	—	—	—	—	Popstar
"Hulk"	2026	—	—	—	—	—	—	—	Popstar
"Popstar"	2026	— (Note: "Popstar" did not enter the Swedish Singellista Chart, but peaked at number 7 on the Swedish Heatseeker Chart.)	—	—	—	—	—	—	Popstar
"—" denotes a recording that did not chart or was not released in that territory.

== Notes ==
Awards and achievements
Preceded by KAJ with "Bara bada bastu"	Sweden in the Eurovision Song Contest; 2026	Succeeded by TBD
