= Simsalabim (Lucianoz song) =

2023 single by Lucianoz

Single by Lucianoz
- Language: Swedish
- Released: 29 September 2023
- Length: 3:53
- Label: Sony
- Songwriters: Stefan Olsson; Emil Jonsson; Caroline Jonsson
- Producer: Stefan Olsson

Lucianoz singles chronology
"Inget stoppar oss nu" (2023)	"Simsalabim" (2023)

Music video
- "Simsalabim" on YouTube

"Simsalabim" is a song by Swedish singer Lucianoz. It was released on 29 September 2023 through Sony.

== Credits and personnel ==
- Lucianoz – vocals
- Stefan Olsson – songwriter, producer
- Emil Jonsson – songwriter
- Caroline Jonsson – songwriter

== Charts ==
Chart performance for "Simsalabim"
Chart (2023)	Peak position
Sweden (Sverigetopplistan)	74

== Release history ==
Release dates and formats for "Simsalabim"
Region	Date	Format(s)	Label(s)	Ref.
Various	29 September 2023	Digital download; streaming	Sony	
