= My System (song) =

2026 single by Felicia

Single by Felicia

from the EP My System and the album Popstar
- Released: 7 February 2026
- Genre: Techno-house; eurotechno
- Length: 3:02
- Label: Universal
- Songwriters: Audun Agnar; Emily Harbakk; Felicia Eriksson; Julie Bergan; Theresa Rex
- Producers: Audun Agnar; Gucci Caliente

Felicia singles chronology
"Hard" (2026)	"My System" (2026)

Music video
- "My System" on YouTube

Eurovision Song Contest 2026 entry
- Country: Sweden
- Artist: Felicia
- Language: English
- Composers: Audun Agnar; Emily Harbakk; Julie Bergan; Theresa Rex
- Lyricists: Audun Agnar; Emily Harbakk; Felicia Eriksson; Julie Bergan; Theresa Rex

Finals performance
- Semi-final result: 9th
- Semi-final points: 96
- Final result: 20th
- Final points: 51

Entry chronology
- ◄ "Bara bada bastu" (2025)

Official performance video
- "My System" (first semi-final) on YouTube

"My System" is a song by Swedish singer Felicia, released as a single on 7 February 2026. The track was co-written by Felicia alongside Audun Agnar, Emily Harbakk, Julie Bergan, and Theresa Rex. The song was performed in Melodifestivalen 2026, and later qualified for the final, which it won. It represented Sweden in the Eurovision Song Contest 2026, where it placed 20th amongst the 35 competing songs. The single debuted at number one in Sweden and charted in the top ten in Finland and Austria.

== Background and composition ==
"My System" was conceived during an international songwriting camp held in Iceland, which brought together a Nordic creative team consisting of songwriters from Sweden, Denmark, and Norway. The track, co-written by Felicia alongside Audun Agnar, Emily Harbakk, Julie Bergan, and Theresa Rex, holds the Melodifestivalen record for the most foreign songwriters on a single entry.

"My System" was Felicia's second Melodifestivalen entry. She had first competed in Melodifestivalen 2024 as Fröken Snusk, a persona whose performer was kept anonymous, with the song "Unga & fria", which failed to qualify for the final but peaked at number one in the Swedish singles chart. She later told the Swedish newspaper Aftonbladet that she experienced depression during this period due to a highly demanding work environment. This led her to abandon the masked persona and start performing and releasing music under her real name.

Musically, "My System" has been described as a techno-house track, built around a heavy, club-oriented beat. Lyrically, the song is sung from the perspective of someone who cannot stop thinking about a former romantic interest. Felicia described it as an emotional song about someone stuck in your head or heart, likening it to a crush you cannot shake off; as she put it, "you can't get the person out of your system".

== Critical reception ==
=== Swedish media and personalities ===
"My System" was met with generally positive to mixed reviews from Swedish music critics. In Expressen, Maria Brander gave the song a five out of five, describing the track as a "hard-hitting transformation" from Felicia's previous Melodifestivalen attempt as Fröken Snusk. Brander further characterised the production as "straight techno-house" featuring a "Berghain-esque drop" that blended "Swedish melancholy" with Felicia's "unrealistically bright humanoid voice". Ronny Larsson and Ken Olausson from the magazine QX both rated the song five out of five. Larsson described the song as "combining Mello-pop with Eurotechno-dunk" and praised its stage performance, but wished for a little more of the song. Olausson described the track as a "2026-blinged Cascada song" and also commended its staging and choreography. Johan Hammerby of Hallandsposten dubbed the track the "most modern song" in Melodifestivalen 2026, praised its staging by calling it "world-class", and complimented Felicia's vocal delivery.

Writing for Barometern, Christian Gustafsson gave the song four out of five stars, calling it the "best song of the year" and predicted that it would win Melodifestivalen 2026 in "Ebba Andersson on the five-mile" style. Matilda Källén of Dagens Nyheter also rated it a four out of five, noting that the track is "professionally produced" that is "maxed out, well-choreographed, [and] ready for Eurovision", albeit stating that her first attempt, "Unga & fria", was a "more fun entry".

In Sydsvenskan, Lee Strandberg rated the track a two out of five, calling its lyrics "bland lines about not being able to let go of the person you have a crush on". While he praised its visual production, he questioned whether the song was the strongest choice to represent the country at Eurovision. Johan Lindqvist of Göteborgs-Posten offered a critical assessment, comparing the track's sound to "something at the bottom of a 'Ball techno from the Baltics' playlist". He further criticised most of the songs from Melodfestivalen, including "My System", for a perceived lack of soul, comparing the songwriting process to an AI-generated "compromise" that feels "vaguely familiar but also strangely foreign".

=== Eurovision-related and international media ===
Eva Frantz of Yle gave a five out of five rating, calling the song a "convincing whole that brings to mind 'Unforgettable' by Marcus & Martinus". In MTV Uutiset, Silja Välske listed the song as one of the entries "you should keep an eye on", describing it as a "functional EDM-pop that comes to life on stage with a light show" and that it is "finely tuned and risk-free". Glen Weldon of National Public Radio ranked the entry second on his list of the 10 best songs competing at Eurovision 2026, acknowledging its potential to win over the viewing public's "hearts and hips". He, however, questioned Sweden's choice of an EDM track, suggesting it might "alienate the juries" whom he described as "the very fuddiest of duddies".

Jon O'Brien from Vulture ranked the entry 11th out of the 35 entries, describing it as a "full-throttle confession of infatuation" where there is "little restrained" in its delivery. He wrote that the sound combines "the abrasiveness of PC Music, the hard-hitting techno of Berghain circa 4 a.m., and the cheesy Clubland pop of Cascada", albeit noting that "mainstream votes might not be so plentiful". In TV 2, Line Haus gave the entry a five out of six, calling it a track with massive "potential to become an international hit". However, she criticised the song's "Matrix-inspired" performance and choreography to be "a bit too sloppy" at times. Further, she noted that viewers would find it difficult to engage to the performance when they "either see eyes but no mouth singing, or mouth singing but no eyes". In the Norwegian newspaper Dagbladet, Ralf Lofstad gave the song a four out of six, calling it a "high-energy rave" entry with "nice dynamics" that has a calm verse building up to the chorus. However, he criticised the song for not being strong enough and Felicia for struggling with her vocals and stage performance at times.

== Eurovision Song Contest 2026 ==
=== Melodifestivalen 2026 ===
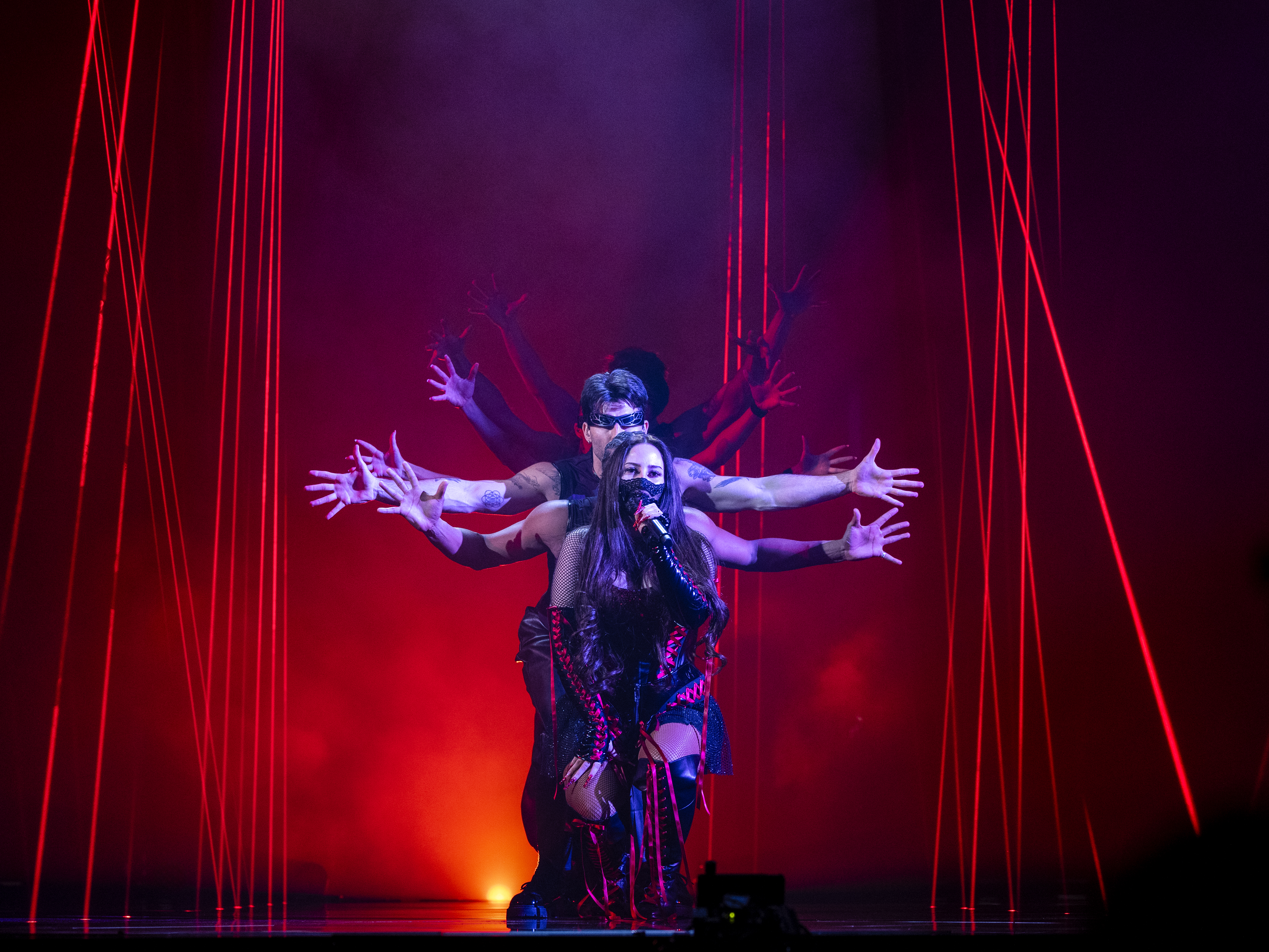
Felicia performing "My System" during the Melodifestivalen 2026 Heat 2 rehearsal

Sveriges Television (SVT), the Swedish broadcaster for the Eurovision Song Contest, organised Melodifestivalen 2026, a competition to select the country's entrant for the 2026 contest. A total of 30 entries competed, with Felicia performing during the second heat in Gothenburg on 7 February 2026. Felicia won the heat, qualifying directly for the final, which took place in Stockholm on 8 March. In the final, she placed first with the international juries and televoting, ultimately winning the competition with 161 points.

=== At Eurovision ===
The Eurovision Song Contest 2026 took place at Wiener Stadthalle in Vienna, Austria, and consisted of two semi-finals held on the respective dates of 12 and 14 May and the final on 16 May 2026. During the allocation draw held on 12 January 2026, Sweden was drawn to compete in the first semi-final, performing in the first half of the show. Felicia was later drawn to perform second, after Moldova's Satoshi and before Croatia's Lelek. "My System" qualified for the grand final.

Felicia performed a repeat of her performance in the grand final on 16 May. The song performed 20th, after Lithuania's Lion Ceccah and before Cyprus' Antigoni. The song received 51 points, finishing in 20th place.

== Charts ==
Chart performance for "My System"
Chart (2026)	Peak position
Austria (Ö3 Austria Top 40)	9
Finland (Suomen virallinen lista)	8
Germany (GfK)	87
Greece International (IFPI)	28
Lithuania (AGATA)	28
Norway (IFPI Norge)	87
Sweden (Sverigetopplistan)	1
Switzerland (Schweizer Hitparade)	79
UK Dance (Official Charts)	39
UK Singles Sales (OCC)	17

== Certifications ==
Certifications for "My System"
Region	Certification	Certified units/sales
Streaming
Sweden (GLF)	Gold	6,000,000^{†}
^{†} Streaming-only figures based on certification alone.

== Release history ==
Release dates and formats for "My System"
Region	Date	Format(s)	Version	Label	Ref.
Various	6 February 2026	Digital download; streaming	Original	Warner	
Various	10 April 2026	Digital download; streaming	Acoustic	Warner	
Various	8 May 2026	Digital download; streaming	Blasterjaxx remix	Spinnin'	
Italy	15 May 2026	Radio airplay	Original	Warner	
