= Masked Singer Sverige season 4 =

Masked Singer Sverige
- Season 4

Release
- Original network: TV4
- Original release: 22 March – 17 May 2024

Season chronology
- ← Previous; Season 3 Next → Season 5

The fourth season of the Swedish version of Masked Singer started on 22 March 2024 on TV4. David Hellenius returns as presenter of the show while Nour El Refai, Felix Herngren, Pernilla Wahlgren and Måns Zelmerlöw all return as jury.

== Guest panelists ==
Various guest panelists appeared as the fourth judge in the judging panel for one episode. These guest panelists included:

| Episode | Guest Panelist | Notability |
|---|---|---|
| 2 | Henrik Schyffert | Actor/Comedian |
| 4 | Jessica Almenäs | TV presenter |
| 7 | Fredrik Hallgren | Actor |
| 8 | Shima Niavarani | Actress/Singer |

== Contestants ==
| Stage Name | Identity | Occupation | Episode | | | | | | | | |
| Stage Name | Identity | Occupation | 1 | 2 | 3 | 4 | 5 | 6 | 7 | 8 | 9 |
|---|---|---|---|---|---|---|---|---|---|---|---|
| Kameleonten "Chameleon" | Fröken Snusk | Singer | WIN | | SAFE | | WIN | | WIN | WIN | WINNER |
| Pandorna "Pandas" | Markoolio | Singer | | WIN | | SAFE | | SAFE | WIN | RISK | RUNNER-UP |
| Skelettet "Skeleton" | Hanna Ardéhn | Actress | | RISK | | SAFE | | WIN | WIN | RISK | THIRD |
| Ufot "UFO" | Peter Brynolf | Magicians | RISK | | RISK | | RISK | | RISK | OUT | |
| Ufot "UFO" | Jonas Ljung | Magicians | RISK | | RISK | | RISK | | RISK | OUT | |
| Prinsesstårtan "Princess Cake" | Sarah Dawn Finer | Singer | | RISK | | SAFE | | RISK | RISK | OUT | |
| Diskokulan "Disco Ball" | Jessica Almenäs | TV presenter | RISK | | SAFE | | SAFE | | OUT | | |
| Pirathajen "Pirate Shark" | Per Morberg | Actor | | WIN | | RISK | | OUT | | | |
| Bergatrollet "Mountain Troll" | Thomas Ravelli | Football player | WIN | | SAFE | | OUT | | | | |
| Skyddsängeln "Guardian Angel" | Therese Alshammar | Olympic swimmer | | WIN | | OUT | | | | | |
| Väckarklockan "Alarm Clock" | Ewa Roos | Singer | WIN | | OUT | | | | | | |
| Lejonet "Lion" | Markus Aujalay | Chef | | OUT | | | | | | | |
| Snögubben "Snowman" | Tomas Brolin | Football player | OUT | | | | | | | | |

== Episodes ==
=== Week 1 (22 March) ===
Performances on the first episode
| # | Stage name | Song | Result | |
|---|---|---|---|---|
| 1 | Kameleonten | "Can't Tame Her" by Zara Larsson | WIN | |
| 2 | Snögubben | "Hej, mitt vinterland" by Carola Häggkvist | RISK | |
| 3 | Bergatrollet | "On My Way" by Panetoz | WIN | |
| 4 | Diskokulan | "Dance the Night" by Dua Lipa | RISK | |
| 5 | Ufot | "Air" by Marcus & Martinus | RISK | |
| 6 | Väckarklockan | "Cha Cha Cha" by Käärijä | WIN | |
| Face-off details | | | Identity | Result |
| 1 | Snögubben | "Högt över havet" by Arja Saijonmaa | Tomas Brolin | OUT |
| 2 | Diskokulan | "Bad Romance" by Lady Gaga | undisclosed | SAFE |

=== Week 2 (29 March) ===
Performances on the second episode
| # | Stage name | Song | Result | |
|---|---|---|---|---|
| 1 | Pandorna | "Baby" by Justin Bieber | WIN | |
| 2 | Skelettet | "Bones" by Imagine Dragons | RISK | |
| 3 | Prinsesstårtan | "Tattoo" by Loreen | RISK | |
| 4 | Skyddsängeln | "Unholy" by Sam Smith ft. Kim Petras | WIN | |
| 5 | Lejonet | "It's My Life" by Bon Jovi | RISK | |
| 6 | Pirathajen | "Uptown Funk" by Bruno Mars | WIN | |
| Face-off details | | | Identity | Result |
| 1 | Skelettet | "Pour Some Sugar on Me" by Def Leppard | undisclosed | SAFE |
| 2 | Lejonet | "You Shook Me All Night Long" by AC/DC | Markus Aujalay | OUT |

=== Week 3 (5 April) ===
Performances on the third episode
| # | Stage name | Song | Result | |
|---|---|---|---|---|
| 1 | Ufot | "Diskoteka" by Hooja | RISK | |
| 2 | Diskokulan | "Superstar" by Bianca Ingrosso | SAFE | |
| 3 | Väckarklockan | "Hung Up" by Madonna | RISK | |
| 4 | Kameleonten | "Easy On Me" by Adele | SAFE | |
| 5 | Bergatrollet | "Whatever It Takes" by Imagine Dragons | SAFE | |
| Face-off details | | | Identity | Result |
| 1 | Ufot | "Fight For Your Right" by Beastie Boys | undisclosed | WIN |
| 2 | Väckarklockan | "I Can Jive" by Jerry Williams | Ewa Roos | OUT |

=== Week 4 (12 April) ===
Performances on the fourth episode
| # | Stage name | Song | Result | |
|---|---|---|---|---|
| 1 | Skelettet | "Toxic" by Britney Spears | SAFE | |
| 2 | Skyddsängeln | "Vogue" by Madonna | RISK | |
| 3 | Pirathajen | "That's Amore" by Dean Martin | RISK | |
| 4 | Pandorna | "Shape of My Heart" by Backstreet Boys | SAFE | |
| 5 | Prinsesstårtan | "Con Calma" by Daddy Yankee | SAFE | |
| Face-off details | | | Identity | Result |
| 1 | Skyddsängeln | "Eye of The Tiger" by Survivor | Therese Alshammar | OUT |
| 2 | Pirathajen | "Moviestar" by Harpo | undisclosed | WIN |

=== Week 5 (19 April) ===
Performances on the fifth episode
| # | Stage name | Song | Result | |
|---|---|---|---|---|
| 1 | Bergatrollet | "Amazing" by Danny Saucedo | RISK | |
| 2 | Kameleonten | "Something's Got a Hold on Me" by Etta James | SAFE | |
| 3 | Discokulan | "Cupid" by Fifty-Fifty | SAFE | |
| 4 | Ufot | "Satellit" by Darin | RISK | |
| Winner Face-off details | | | Result | |
| 1 | Kameleonten | "I Will Always Love You" by Whitney Houston | WIN | |
| 2 | Discokulan | "Mer av dig" by Theoz | SAFE | |
| Face-off details | | | Identity | Result |
| 1 | Bergatrollet | "Andas in andas ut" by Thomas Stenström | Thomas Ravelli | OUT |
| 2 | Ufot | "Tainted Love" by Soft Cell | undisclosed | WIN |

=== Week 6 (26 April) ===
Performances on the sixth episode
| # | Stage name | Song | Result | |
|---|---|---|---|---|
| 1 | Pandorna | "Sunroof" by Nicky Youre and Dazy | SAFE | |
| 2 | Prinsesstårtan | "I'm Coming" by Tove Lo | RISK | |
| 3 | Pirathajen | "Josefin" by Albin Lee Meldau | RISK | |
| 4 | Skelettet | "Let's Get Loud" by Jennifer Lopez | SAFE | |
| Winner Face-off details | | | Result | |
| 1 | Pandorna | "Burning Love" by Elvis Presley | SAFE | |
| 2 | Skelettet | "Can't Help Falling in Love" by Elvis Presley | WIN | |
| Face-off details | | | Identity | Result |
| 1 | Prinsesstårtan | "Should I Stay or Should I Go" by The Clash | undisclosed | WIN |
| 2 | Pirathajen | "Sway" by Michael Bublé | Per Morberg | OUT |

=== Week 7 (3 May) ===
Performances on the seventh episode
| # | Stage name | Song | Result | |
|---|---|---|---|---|
| 1 | Diskokulan | "Celebration" by Kool & the Gang | RISK | |
| 2 | Skelettet | "Välkommen åter" by Hanna Ferm and Junie | WIN | |
| 3 | Kameleonten | "S&M" by Rihanna | WIN | |
| 4 | Prinsesstårtan | "What Was I Made For?" by Billie Eilish | RISK | |
| 5 | Ufot | "Ålderdomshemmet" by Miss Li | RISK | |
| 6 | Pandorna | "Never Gonna Not Dance Again" by P!nk | WIN | |
| Face-off details | | | Identity | Result |
| 1 | Diskokulan | "Does Your Mother Know" by ABBA | Jessica Almenäs | OUT |
| 2 | Prinsesstårtan | "So What" by P!nk | undisclosed | WIN |

=== Week 8 (10 May) ===
Performances on the eighth episode
| # | Stage name | Song | Duet Partner | Identity | Result |
|---|---|---|---|---|---|
| 1 | Pandorna | "Girls Girls Girls" by Dolly Style | Dolly Style | undisclosed | RISK |
| 2 | Ufot | "Gimme Some Lovin'" by the Spencer Davis Group | Viktor Norén | undisclosed | RISK |
| 3 | Prinsesstårtan | "Juice" by Lizzo | Maxida Märak | Sarah Dawn Finer | OUT |
| 4 | Kameleonten | "...Baby One More Time" by Britney Spears | Måns Zelmerlöw | undisclosed | WIN |
| 5 | Skelettet | "Shuffla"/"Hela världen väntar" by Samir & Viktor | Samir & Viktor | undisclosed | RISK |
| Face-off details | | | | Identity | Result |
| 1 | Pandorna | "Wake Me Up" by Avicii | | undisclosed | WIN |
| 2 | Ufot | "The Fox (What Does the Fox Say?)" by Ylvis | | Peter Brynolf and Jonas Ljung | OUT |

=== Week 9 (17 May) ===
- Group number: "Larger Than Life" by Backstreet Boys

Performances on the ninth episode
| # | Stage name | Song | Identity | Result |
|---|---|---|---|---|
| 1 | Kameleonten | "You Love Who You Love" by Zara Larsson | undisclosed | SAFE |
| 2 | Pandorna | "Dynamite" by BTS | undisclosed | SAFE |
| 3 | Skelettet | "Cry Me a River" by Justin Timberlake | Hanna Ardéhn | THIRD |
| Final Face-off details | | | Identity | Result |
| 1 | Kameleonten | "Can't Tame Her" by Zara Larsson/"Something's Got a Hold on Me" by Etta James/"S&M" by Rihanna | Fröken Snusk | WINNER |
| 2 | Pandorna | "Sunroof by Nicky Youre and Dazy/"Never Gonna Not Dance Again" by P!nk/"Burning Love" by Elvis Presley | Markoolio | RUNNER-UP |
