= A-tractor =

Converted agricultural vehicle in Sweden

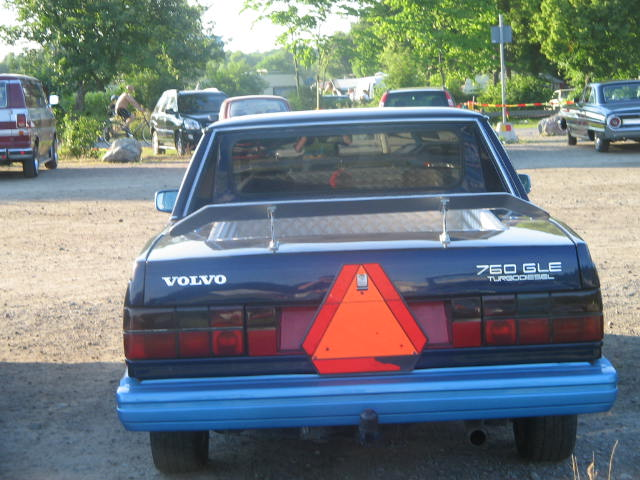
Characteristic and mandatory: the reflective warning triangle on the rear of the vehicle

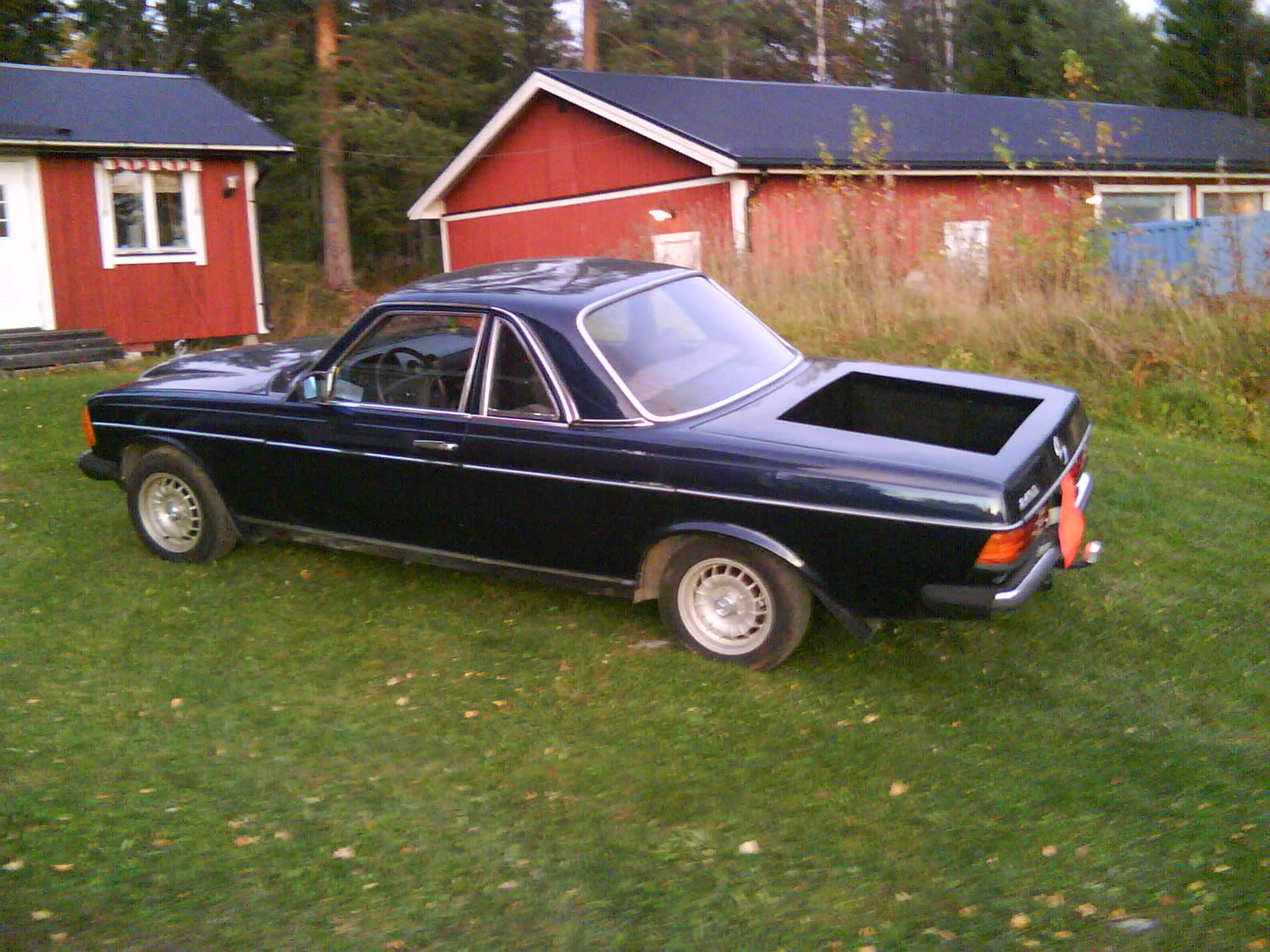
A shortened Mercedes-Benz W123 used as an A-tractor in Sweden

An A-tractor is a self-constructed agricultural tractor in Sweden from a converted production vehicle or vehicle parts, which can be driven with an AM driver's license. The top speed is mechanically and/or electronically limited to 30 km/h (19 mph). A-tractors are very popular among young people in Sweden.

Colloquially, A-tractors are often referred to as EPA tractors, which were the direct predecessors of these tractors.

== History ==
The construction of so-called EPA tractors began in Sweden in the late 1920s. These were self-constructed vehicles made from scrap vehicle parts or converted production vehicles (mostly cars), and were quite common in the 1930s.

In 1963, A-tractors were introduced as an alternative to EPA tractors. However, they were subject to stricter requirements and were therefore not widely used by young people. By 31 March 1975, EPA tractors were to be banned and completely replaced by A-tractors by March 1978 because the Swedish government considered EPA tractors a traffic and accident risk. After protests and the collection of approximately 6,800 signatures, the government changed its mind in 1978, and the regulations for EPA tractors and A-tractors were merged, allowing their continued use (including by young people) to this day.

By 2020, approximately 12,000 A-tractors (EPA tractors) were said to be in operation in Sweden. On 15 July 2020, the Swedish Ministry of Infrastructure eased the technical requirements for conversion to A-tractors, so that by the end of 2021, approximately 36,000 were said to be in operation.

== Differences in tractors in Sweden ==
Since 1975, no new EPA tractors can be registered. A-type tractors are often referred to as EPA tractors, even if they refer to A-type tractors newly registered after 1975.

In addition to A-type tractors and B-type tractors, there is also a classification into tractor A and tractor B. Simply put, an A-type tractor is a car converted into a tractor, while a tractor A is a slow-moving tractor (the maximum speed of tractor A is 40 km/h (25 mph)). Tractors with a higher design speed are classified as tractor B. The distinction between tractor A and tractor B was only introduced in 2016.

== Design restrictions and specifications ==
Mandatory warning triangle on the rear of an A-class tractor to identify it as a slow-moving vehicle

The maximum design speed of an A-class tractor on a horizontal road surface may not exceed 30 km/h (±10%). An A-class tractor must be equipped with a towing hitch, passengers may only be transported on one row of seats (the driver and a maximum of two passengers), and the vehicle must be equipped with a so-called LGF sign (Swedish: Långsamtgående fordon) at the rear. This sign identifies the A-class tractor as a slow-moving vehicle.

As with the EPA tractor, the A-class tractor must be structurally designed to withstand the loads. A roll bar may be installed in certain circumstances. Unlike the EPA tractor, the A-class tractor is not required to have a rigid base frame; the body can also be self-supporting. Before first putting an A-class tractor into operation, it must undergo a registration inspection. After that, regular inspections are required: the first 48 months after initial registration and then every 24 months.

Workshops in Sweden offer vehicle conversions into A-class tractors.
