= Det är ju dej jag går och väntar på =

1984 song by Stefan Borsch

Song by Stefan Borsch

from the album Sissi
- Language: Swedish
- Released: 1984
- Studio: KMH (Stockholm); CMM (Skara)
- Genre: Pop
- Length: 2:57
- Label: Mariann
- Songwriters: Søren Bundgaard; Keld Heick; Danne Stråhed
- Producer: Anders Engberg

"Det är ju dej jag går och väntar på" is a song recorded by Swedish singer Stefan Borsch for his fifth studio album, Sissi (1984). It was written by Søren Bundgaard, Keld Heick and Danne Stråhed, with production by Anders Engberg. It is a Swedish version of ”Det lige det” by Hot Eyes, which was the Danish entry in the Eurovision Song Contest 1984.

== Credits and personnel ==
- Stefan Borsch – vocals
- Søren Bundgaard – songwriter
- Keld Heick – songwriter
- Danne Stråhed – songwriter
- Anders Engberg – producer, arranger
- Åke Grahn – engineering
- Conny Ebegård – engineering
- Lennart Karlsmyr – engineering
- Janis Laganovskis – engineering

Credits and personnel adapted from the Sissi album liner notes.

== Lucianoz version ==
"Det är ju dej jag går och väntar på"

Single by Lucianoz
- Language: Swedish
- Released: 25 December 2022
- Length: 2:57
- Label: Sony
- Songwriters: Søren Bundgaard; Keld Heick; Danne Stråhed
- Producers: Stefan Olsson; Calle Ask

Lucianoz singles chronology
"Det är ju dej jag går och väntar på" (2022)	"Inga blommor växer på en sjömans grav" (2023)

In 2022, Swedish singer Lucianoz recorded a cover of "Det är ju dej jag går och väntar på". Lucianoz's version was produced by Stefan Olsson and Calle Ask. Lucianoz and Borsch met in 2024.

=== Track listing and formats ===
- Digital single
1. "Det är ju dej jag går och väntar på" – 2:57

=== Credits and personnel ===
- Lucianoz – vocals
- Stefan Olsson – producer
- Calle Ask – producer

=== Charts ===
Chart (2023)	Peak position
Sweden (Sverigetopplistan)	32

=== Certifications ===
Certifications for "Det är ju dej jag går och väntar på"
Region	Certification	Certified units/sales
Sweden (GLF)	Platinum	8,000,000^{†}
^{†} Streaming-only figures based on certification alone.

=== Release history ===
Release dates and formats for "Det är ju dej jag går och väntar på"
Region	Date	Format(s)	Label(s)	Ref.
Various	25 December 2022	Digital download; streaming	Sony	
Sweden	27 June 2023	Radio airplay	Sony	
