= Sarettii =

Swedish rapper

- Genre: Hip hop
- Occupations: Rapper; singer

Sarettii is a Swedish rapper, also known as Sarettii (𝟧𝟣𝟦𝟪), he creates his music in and lives in Hisings Backa. His biggest commercial success has been the single "Som Dom" reaching number 1 on Sverigetopplistan, the official Swedish Singles Chart. Sarettis music video for the song "Matador" became the most viewed music video of 2022 for Sweden on YouTube.

== Discography ==
=== Albums ===
| Title | Details | Peak chart positions |
| Title | Details | SWE |
|---|---|---|
| Come Alive | Released: 19 April 2023; Label: Ringtone; Formats: Digital download, streaming | 2 |

=== Singles ===
| Title | Year | Peak chart positions | | Certifications | Album |
| Title | Year | SWE | NOR | Certifications | Album |
|---|---|---|---|---|---|
| "Runt" | 2020 | — | — | | Non-album singles |
| "Mariachi" | 2020 | — | — | | Non-album singles |
| "Distans" | 2020 | — | — | | Non-album singles |
| "Allt sånt" | 2021 | 37 | — | | Non-album singles |
| "On the Road" | 2021 | 93 | — | IFPI: Gold | Non-album singles |
| "Skräckfilm" (with Dree Low) | 2021 | 20 | — | | Non-album singles |
| "Som dom" | 2021 | 1 | — | | Non-album singles |
| "Matador" | 2022 | 1 | — | IFPI: 2× Platinum | Come Alive |
| "Ella Mai" | 2023 | 10 | — | | Come Alive |
| "Likkle Boy" | 2023 | 30 | — | | Non-album singles |
| "Duktig tjej" | 2024 | 11 | — | | Non-album singles |
| "Hemsk" (with Asme) | 2024 | 1 | — | IFPI: Platinum | Non-album singles |
| "I Might" | 2024 | 1 | 24 | | Non-album singles |
| "Love Drug" | 2024 | — (Note: "Love Drug" did not enter the Swedish singles chart, but peaked at number ten on the Swedish Heatseeker chart.) | — | | Non-album singles |
| "00:42" | 2025 | 27 | — | | Non-album singles |
| "Rina Rina" | 2025 | 22 | — | | Non-album singles |
| "Tribe" | 2025 | — (Note: "Tribe" did not enter the Swedish singles chart, but peaked at number eight on the Swedish Heatseeker chart.) | — | | Non-album singles |
| "Jetpack" (with Asme) | 2025 | 23 | — | | Non-album singles |
| "Sweet Propane" | 2025 | 14 | — | | Non-album singles |
| "Project 4 (Freestyle)" | 2026 | 64 | — | | Non-album singles |
| "Terminalen zutt (Freestyle)" | 2026 | — (Note: "Terminalen zutt (Freestyle)" did not enter the Swedish Singellista Chart, but peaked at number 10 on the Swedish Heatseeker Chart.) | — | | Non-album singles |
| "Moët" (with G3B) | 2026 | 31 | — | | Non-album singles |

=== Other charted songs ===
| Title | Year | Peak chart positions | Album |
| Title | Year | SWE | Album |
|---|---|---|---|
| "Blickar" | 2023 | 71 | Come Alive |
| "Vi kan" | 2023 | — (Note: "Vi kan" did not enter the Swedish Singellista Chart, but peaked at number 19 on the Swedish Heatseeker Chart.) | Come Alive |
| "GGTM" | 2023 | — (Note: "GGTM" did not enter the Swedish Singellista Chart, but peaked at number 16 on the Swedish Heatseeker Chart.) | Come Alive |
| "Waka Waka" | 2023 | 12 | Come Alive |
| "Cali Kush" | 2023 | — (Note: "Cali Kush" did not enter the Swedish Singellista Chart, but peaked at number four on the Swedish Heatseeker Chart.) | Come Alive |
