= IJustWantToBeCool =

Swedish comedy trio

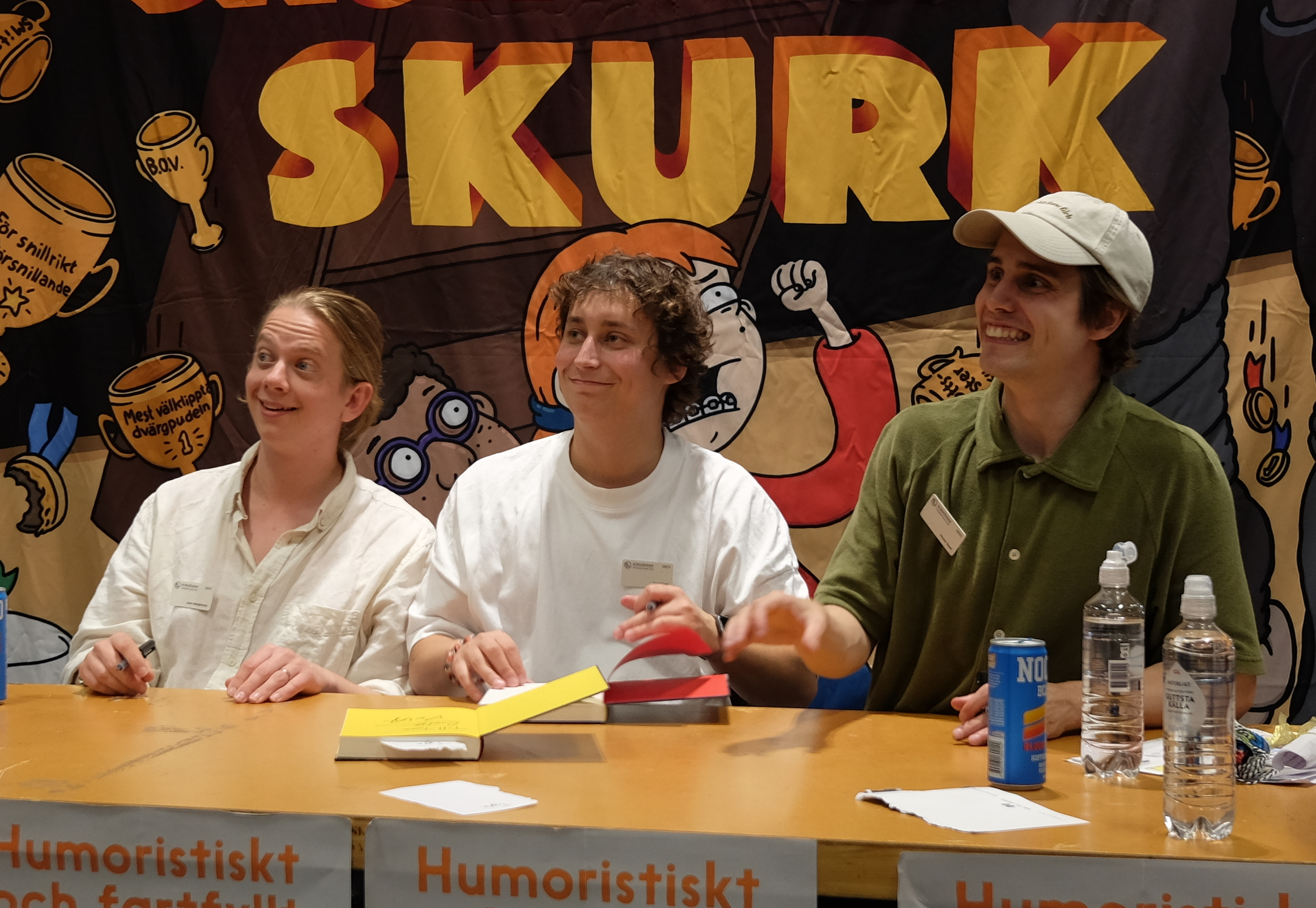
- I Just Want To Be Cool signing their book Skurkarnas skurk at the Gothenburg Book Fair in 2023. (From left: Joel Adolphson, Emil Beer, Victor Beer)

Comedy career
- Medium: YouTube, TV, podcast
- Genre: Sketch comedy
- Members: Victor Beer; Emil Ejdemo Beer; Joel Adolphson

YouTube information
- Channels: @IJustWantToBeCool; @IJustWantToBeCool2; @IJustWantToBeCoolGaming
- Years active: 2009–present
- Subscribers: 1.02 million (main channel); 926 thousand (second channel); 246 thousand (gaming channel)
- Views: 539 million (main channel); 838 million (second channel); 138 million (gaming channel)
- Last updated: 16 November 2026

I Just Want To Be Cool, written by the group as IJustWantToBeCool (sometimes abbreviated to IJWTBC), is a Swedish comedy trio consisting of brothers Victor Beer (born February 5, 1992) and Emil Ejdemo Beer (born October 28, 1994), along with their cousin Joel Adolphson (born March 26, 1992). Since 2011, the trio has gained popularity by publishing comedic videos (sketches) on YouTube and has consistently been listed as the most influential social media personalities in Sweden, reaching a peak in 2022.

== Background ==
I Just Want To Be Cool was formed by brothers Victor Beer (born February 5, 1992) and Emil Beer (born October 28, 1994) along with their cousin Joel Adolphson (born March 26, 1992). The members grew up in Lindholmen in Vallentuna and were making their own films as a hobby even as children. However, it was not until the end of 2011 that they started uploading their clips to YouTube. An article in Sydsvenskan from July 2013 stated that all three were studying at that time: Victor Beer at KTH Royal Institute of Technology, Emil Beer at a media high school, and Joel Adolphson digital film effects at Campus i12 in Eksjö. In a video clip published on updates, including that Joel Adolphson had moved back to Stockholm and that all three had completed their studies.

== Career ==
I Just Want To Be Cool has had four of their own web series on Sveriges Television, including Semi (2013), The Art Of Making Your Mom Cry (2014–2015), A Completely Ordinary Day (2019), and The School (2019). They also had a TV series on TV4 called Small Town (2017).

Since 2019, the group has produced several audiobook series on Storytel.

In 2020, the group launched a podcast called "What Would You Do?". The name was later shortened to "What? with IJustWantToBeCool" to keep it concise and include the brand name in the title. In the podcast, they ask and answer each other's questions about what they would do in various situations. At the beginning of 2023, the podcast moved to Spotify, and on October 16, 2026, they made a channel for it.

In 2022, the group released the first book in a trilogy titled Skurkarnas skurk. The third and final part was released in 2024, and on February 6, 2026, they released a movie for the first book, with the second installment premiering in theaters January 29, 2027.

On July 8, 2024, their main YouTube channel reached one million subscribers.
