= Bolaget =

Swedish band

- Origin: Falun, Sweden
- Genres: Pop; epadunk
- Years active: 2019–present
- Labels: Bolaget; Warner Music Sweden
- Members: Adam Bergestål; Gustav Jörgensen; Oliver Norqvist; William Ahlborg
- Website: bolagetrecords.com

Bolaget (Swedish pronunciation: [buːˌlɑːɡɛt]) are a Swedish musical group from Falun. Formed in 2019, the band consists of Adam Bergestål, Gustav Jörgensen, Oliver Norqvist and William Ahlborg. They had the most-streamed song in Sweden in 2022 ("Kan inte gå") and 2023 ("Ikväll igen"). In 2024, they won the Grammis for Song of the Year for "Ikväll igen". As of January 2025, they have five number-one singles in Sweden.

The four members met while at a hockey high school in Falun, and first started making music while freestyling for fun on a computer and microphone at a pre-party at Bergestål's home in May 2019. They listened to the recording the next day and liked its sound so they decided to re-record and release the song on Spotify. The song, "Fem komma tvåan", is considered their breakthrough single and was inspired and named after a can of beer. Bolaget wrote two more songs and were approached by a nighclub in Falun asking if they wanted to perform; their set list consisted of their three songs and a Magnus Uggla cover. During the COVID-19 pandemic, the band could not perform live but continued to write songs. Initially releasing music through their own Bolaget Records, the band signed a record deal with Warner Music Sweden in February 2023, and they signed a publishing deal with Warner Chappell Music in January 2024. In May 2025, the band opened The King's Fox, a gastropub on Kungsgatan, Stockholm, in collaboration with Burgsvik Group.

The name Bolaget (lit. 'the company') comes from a sign for the Swedish alcohol monopoly Systembolaget hanging on the living room wall of one of the band members. The band consider their music to be pop or pop punk; they have also been described as epadunk, a classification which the band rejects. Most of their songs are about binge drinking and partying. The band members do not consider themselves musicians but have learned some guitar, bass, piano and drums.

== Band members ==
All members of Bolaget were born between 1996 and 1998, and have quit their day jobs to focus full-time on their music careers. All four members contribute to songwriting.

- Adam Bergestål – lead vocalist, guitarist, bassist, and responsible for recording and production. From Falun, but has since moved to Stockholm, and formerly employed in the wood industry.
- Gustav Jörgensen – guitarist, bassist, and responsible for recording and production. From Falun and formerly worked in the wood industry. Played as a forward for Falu IF in the 2018–2019 season. Lives in Falun.
- Oliver Norqvist – from Stockholm and has since moved back. Formerly worked as a hotel receptionist for Scandic. Played as a right winger for Falu IF in the 2014–2015 season, then for the San Diego Sabers in the 2015–2016 season, and then for Tegs SK Hockey for a few months in 2016. In March 2026, it was announced that Norqvist would be a judge on the Swedish Idol series for that year's season.
- William Ahlborg – DJ and CEO of Bolaget Records. From Gävle and formerly worked as a coffee machine technician. Played as a defenceman for Falu IF for three seasons in 2016–2019. He lives in Falun with his wife, Jennifer Dolleris, and their two children. His sister is influencer Linn Ahlborg.

== Discography ==
=== Singles ===
List of singles, with year released and chart positions
Title	Year	Peak positions		Certification
Title	Year	SWE	NOR	Certification
"Vin & pengar" (featuring William Ahlborg)	2019	—	—	
"Fem komma tvåan"	2019	— (Note: "Fem komma tvåan" did not enter the Swedish singles chart, but peaked at number three on the Swedish Heatseeker chart.)	—	IFPI Sverige: 2× Platinum
"Afterwork"	2019	— (Note: "Afterwork" did not enter the Swedish singles chart, but peaked at number two on the Swedish Heatseeker chart.)	—	IFPI Sverige: Gold
"Nykter"	2019	— (Note: "Nykter" did not enter the Swedish singles chart, but peaked at number eight on the Swedish Heatseeker chart.)	—	IFPI Sverige: Platinum
"Efterskida"	2020	—	—	
"Jag & Åke"	2020	— (Note: "Jag & Åke" did not enter the Swedish singles chart, but peaked at number four on the Swedish Heatseeker chart.)	—	IFPI Sverige: Gold
"Fingrarna i halsen"	2020	40	—	IFPI Sverige: 2× Platinum
"Dum"	2020	20	—	IFPI Sverige: 2× Platinum
"Borde gå hem"	2021	90	—	IFPI Sverige: Platinum
"Brände hela lönen" (with De Vet Du)	2021	57	—	IFPI Sverige: Platinum
"Kan inte gå"	2021	1	—	IFPI Sverige: 4× Platinum
"Supa" (with De Vet Du)	2022	14	—	IFPI Sverige: Platinum
"Någon annan (efter fem)"	2022	100	—	IFPI Sverige: Gold
"Ikväll igen"	2023	1	29	IFPI Sverige: 5× Platinum; IFPI Norge: Gold
"Farväl"	2023	1	—	
"Astronaut"	2023	2	—	
"Låt mig va" (with Victor Leksell)	2023	1	—	
"Välkommen ner"	2024	4	—	IFPI Sverige: Platinum
"Längesen"	2024	1	—	
"Alla ska dö"	2025	7	—	
"Superman" (with Hoffmaestro)	2025	8	—	
"Knock Me Out"	2025	16	—	
"Fel på dig" (with Dante)	2026	4	—	
"Det ligger nåt i luften"	2026	1	—	
"Veteraner"	2026	3	—	
"—" denotes a release that did not chart.

== Awards and nominations ==
Award	Year	Category	Recipient(s)	Result	Ref.
Dalecarlia Music Awards	2021	Band of the Year	Bolaget	Nominated	
Dalecarlia Music Awards	2021	Song of the Year	"Fingrarna i halsen"	Nominated	
Dalecarlia Music Awards	2021	Music Video of the Year	"Dum" – Anton Elfsberg	Nominated	
Dalecarlia Music Awards	2022	Band of the Year	Bolaget	Nominated	
Dalecarlia Music Awards	2022	Music Video of the Year	"Brände hela lönen" (with De Vet Du) – Anton Elfsberg and Karl Bergsten	Nominated	
Dalecarlia Music Awards	2023	Band of the Year	Bolaget	Won	
Dalecarlia Music Awards	2023	Live Experience of the Year	Midsommarfesten, Leksand	Nominated	
Dalecarlia Music Awards	2024	Band of the Year	Bolaget	Won	
Dalecarlia Music Awards	2024	Song of the Year	"Ikväll igen"	Won	
Dalecarlia Music Awards	2024	Music Video of the Year	"Ikväll igen" – Anton Elfsberg and Karl Bergsten	Won	
Dalecarlia Music Awards	2025	Band of the Year	Bolaget	Nominated	
Dalecarlia Music Awards	2026	Band of the Year	Bolaget	Nominated	
Dalecarlia Music Awards	2026	Live Experience of the Year	Stora torget, Falun	Nominated	
Grammis	2024	Artist of the Year	Bolaget	Nominated	
Grammis	2024	Song of the Year	"Ikväll igen"	Won	
Grammis	2024	Newcomer of the Year	Combined work from the year	Nominated	
Grammis	2024	Pop of the Year	Combined work from the year	Nominated	
Rockbjörnen	2023	Group of the Year	Bolaget	Nominated	
Rockbjörnen	2023	Breakthrough of the Year	Bolaget	Nominated	
Rockbjörnen	2023	Fans of the Year	Bolaget fans	Nominated	
Rockbjörnen	2024	Group of the Year	Bolaget	Nominated	
Rockbjörnen	2024	Fans of the Year	Bolaget fans	Nominated	
Rockbjörnen	2025	Group of the Year	Bolaget	Nominated	
