= Linn Ahlborg =

Swedish blogger and YouTube personality

- Born: Linn Joanna Elsa Ahlborg; 4 September 1999 (age 26); Stockholm, Sweden
- Occupation: Blogger
- Website: www.linnahlborg.se

Linn Joanna Elsa Ahlborg (born 4 September 1999) is a Swedish blogger and YouTube personality.

Linn runs one of Sweden's largest YouTube channels with almost 370,000 subscribers and over 500,000 followers on Instagram. Her blog with over 2.5 million readers a week makes Linn's blog one of Sweden's largest blogs. She also runs the limited company Linn Ahlborg AB.

== Career ==
She has had several blogs until she started her current one in 2013. By 2018 her blog is the most visited one at blog portal Nouw with approximately 868 247 page views per week. Since 2012 Ahlborg vlogs frequently on YouTube, with all content being in Swedish.

== Awards and nominations ==
Year	Nominated	Award	Result
2014	Herself	Guldtuben: Newcomer of the Year	Nominated
2014	Herself	Guldtuben: Lifestyle Channel of the Year	Won
2016	Herself	Finest Awards: Fashion Blog of the Year	Nominated
2016	Herself	Finest Awards: YouTube Channel of the Year	Nominated
