= C.Gambino =

Swedish rapper (1998–2024)

- Born: 4 April 1998; Stockholm
- Origin: Gothenburg, Sweden
- Died: 4 June 2024 (aged 26) Gothenburg, Sweden
- Genres: Swedish hip hop; gangsta rap
- Occupation: Rapper • singer
- Instrument: Voice
- Years active: 2018-2024
- Labels: GG Music; Asylum Nordics; Warner

Karar Ali Salem Ramadan (4 April 1998 – 4 June 2024), best known by his stage name C.Gambino, was a Swedish masked rapper and singer signed to Warner Music Sweden.

== Career ==
He was from Angered, Gothenburg. C.Gambino debuted in 2019 with the single "Rebell", produced by Primo Gambino. Following a pair of singles in the coming year, including "Buntar" featuring Aden, "NADA" and "LALA", C.Gambino released his six-track debut EP Demons No Angels (DNA) in December 2020.

On January 7, 2022, C.Gambino released the debut album Sin City. The eleven-track album contained the previously released singles "CCTV" and "Tankar", and featured guest appearances by 23 on track 6, "M5". Sin City reached second place on the Swedish Toplist. The following year, C.Gambino collaborated with Swedish rapper 23 on the six-track EP M.O.B, a project that topped the Swedish charts for four weeks.

C.Gambino was named by Adidas and Spotify as one of the artists in the Class of 2021 - with promising future names to keep an eye on in Swedish hip-hop. In conjunction with the nomination, C.Gambino together with Spotify Studio 100 released the single "Woman", produced by Markos "Mackan" Yosif.

At the beginning of C.Gambino's career, he and his collective GG Music released the songs independently through the distribution service Amuse, but in October 2023, he chose to sign a contract with Warner Music Sweden and left all previous releases to Warner.

On January 5, 2024, C.Gambino released his second studio album, In Memory of Some Stand Up Guys, which also became his last album release before his death. The album, which was produced by Oscar "Chase" Karlsson, contains twelve tracks, including the previously released singles "G63", "Automatic", and the accompanying remix that featured guests from Italy's Baby Gang. The album peaked at number one in Sweden, number seven in Norway and number 19 in Finland. On March 22 of the same year, C.Gambino released a deluxe version of the album – In Memory Of Some Stand Up Guys (Private Collection) and contained six additional tracks.

At the 2024 Grammis Awards, C.Gambino won in the Hip-Hop of the Year category for his 2023 total output. He was posthumously nominated for two Grammis in 2025.

== Death and aftermath ==
On the evening of 4 June 2024, Ramadan was shot in a parking garage located in Gothenburg, near where he lived at the time. He was admitted to hospital, where he died from his injuries hours later. He was 26 years old. Days before the murder, C.Gambino released the single "Sista Gång" and promoted the song as his absolute last.

At the Swedish 2025 Grammy Awards, C.Gambino posthumously won the Hip Hop of the Year category for 2024's Sista Gång, In Memory Of Some Stand Up Guys (Private Collection). Upon winning, C.Gambino was honored with producer Oscar Chase playing an acoustic version of the unreleased song "Ängel" with the Stockholm Studio Orchestra.

On 16 July 2025, a court in Gothenburg sentenced three people to up to 22 years' imprisonment for his murder.

== Discography ==
=== Studio albums ===
List of studio albums, with selected chart positions
Title	Album details	Peak chart positions			
Title	Album details	SWE	DEN	FIN	NOR
Sin City	Released: 7 January 2022; Label: Asylum Nordics, Warner; Format: Digital download, streaming	2	—	—	—
In Memory of Some Stand Up Guys	Released: 5 January 2024; Label: Asylum Nordics, Warner; Format: Digital download, streaming	1	33	22	6
"—" denotes a recording that did not chart or was not released in that territory.

=== EPs ===
List of EPs, with selected chart positions
Title	EP details	Peak chart positions	
Title	EP details	SWE	NOR
Demons No Angels (DNA)	Released: 18 December 2020; Label: Asylum Nordics, Warner; Format: Digital download, streaming	42	—
M.O.B (with 23)	Released: 5 January 2023; Label: Paid in Full; Format: Digital download, streaming	1	32
Silent Hills	Released: 3 November 2023; Label: Asylum Nordics, Warner; Format: Digital download, streaming	—	—
"—" denotes a recording that did not chart or was not released in that territory.

=== Singles ===
List of singles, with selected chart positions
Title	Year	Peak chart positions			Certifications	Album
Title	Year	SWE	FIN	NOR	Certifications	Album
"Rebell"	2019	—	—	—		Non-album single
"Buntar" (with Aden)	2019	—	—	—		Non-album single
"Lala"	2020	—	—	—		Non-album single
"Nada"	2020	—	—	—		Non-album single
"Redo"	2020	—	—	—		Non-album single
"Tap Tap"	2020	—	—	—		Non-album single
"Cosa Nostra" (with 2.clock)	2020	—	—	—		Non-album single
"Coca"	2020	—	—	—		Demons No Angels (DNA)
"Dangerous"	2021	—	—	—		Non-album single
"Svävar"	2021	— (Note: "Svävar" did not enter the Swedish Singles Chart, but peaked at number 10 on the Swedish Heatseeker chart.)	—	—		Non-album single
"Cante"	2021	—	—	—		Non-album single
"CCTV"	2021	25	—	—	GLF: Platinum	Sin City
"Tankar"	2021	36	—	—	GLF: Gold	Sin City
"Bando"	2021	— (Note: "Bando" did not enter the Swedish Singles Chart, but peaked at number 4 on the Swedish Heatseeker chart.)	—	—		Sin City
"Woman"	2022	23	—	—		Non-album single
"Regler (Blåset)"	2022	11	—	—	GLF: Platinum	Non-album single
"Say Less"	2022	47	—	—		Non-album single
"En chans" (with 23)	2022	13	—	—	GLF: Platinum	M.O.B
"XXX (Bow Wow Wow)"	2022	63	—	—	GLF: Gold	Non-album single
"M.O.B" (with 23)	2022	14	—	—	GLF: Platinum	M.O.B
"Ghetto Psykos (GS)" (with 01an)	2023	21	—	—	GLF: Gold	Non-album single
"G63"	2023	2	—	6	GLF: 2× Platinum	In Memory of Some Stand Up Guys
"Catwalk"	2023	—	—	—	GLF: Gold	Non-album single
"Automatic"	2023	1	6	9	GLF: Gold	In Memory of Some Stand Up Guys
"Sista gång"	2024	1	—	4		Non-album single
"—" denotes a recording that did not chart or was not released in that territory.

=== Featured singles ===
List of singles, with selected chart positions
Title	Year	Peak chart positions	Certifications	Album
Title	Year	SWE	Certifications	Album
"Inkassera" (Robin Kadir featuring C.Gambino and 23)	2023	9	GLF: Platinum	Deja Vu
"Mentalité RMX" (Baby Gang featuring C.Gambino)	2023	7	GLF: Gold	In Memory of Some Stand Up Guys
"Saint Laurent" (Robin Kadir featuring C.Gambino)	2023	24	GLF: Gold	Deja Vu

=== Other charted songs ===
List of other charted songs, with selected chart positions
Title	Year	Peak chart positions	Certifications	Album
Title	Year	SWE	Certifications	Album
"Fastnat"	2021	— (Note: "Fastnat" did not enter the Swedish Singles Chart, but peaked at number 7 on the Swedish Heatseeker chart.)		Demons No Angels (DNA)
"Street" (Asme featuring C.Gambino)	2021	78		Tusen flows
"Rider"	2022	40	GLF: Gold	Sin City
"ManyMen"	2022	— (Note: "ManyMen" did not enter the Swedish Singles Chart, but peaked at number 6 on the Swedish Heatseeker chart.)		Sin City
"Skakar"	2022	91	GLF: Gold	Sin City
"Ey Maria"	2022	— (Note: "Ey Maria" did not enter the Swedish Singles Chart, but peaked at number 12 on the Swedish Heatseeker chart.)		Sin City
"M5" (with 23)	2022	2	GLF: Platinum	Sin City
"Faller"	2022	— (Note: "Faller" did not enter the Swedish Singles Chart, but peaked at number 3 on the Swedish Heatseeker chart.)		Sin City
"Tärningar" (with 23)	2023	96		M.O.B
"Drill" (with 23)	2023	46		M.O.B
"Dreams" (with 23)	2023	5	GLF: Platinum	M.O.B
"Man" (with 23)	2023	75		M.O.B
"No Go"	2023	80		Silent Hills
"Extend"	2023	15		Silent Hills
"Val d'Isère"	2023	— (Note: "Val d'Isère" did not enter the Swedish Singles Chart, but peaked at number 15 on the Swedish Heatseeker chart.)		Silent Hills
"Who We Are"	2024	17		In Memory of Some Stand Up Guys
"Rich H*es"	2024	32		In Memory of Some Stand Up Guys
"Svar"	2024	1		In Memory of Some Stand Up Guys
"TSM"	2024	20		In Memory of Some Stand Up Guys
"Ma vie"	2024	53		In Memory of Some Stand Up Guys
"Ey Mamma"	2024	61		In Memory of Some Stand Up Guys
"Amsterdam"	2024	55		In Memory of Some Stand Up Guys
"Akid"	2024	65		In Memory of Some Stand Up Guys
"In Memory of Some Stand Up Guys"	2024	51		In Memory of Some Stand Up Guys
"Good & Bad"	2024	— (Note: "Good & Bad" did not enter the Swedish Singellista Chart, but peaked at number six on the Swedish Heatseeker Chart.)		In Memory of Some Stand Up Guys (Private Collection)
"Diamanter"	2024	48		In Memory of Some Stand Up Guys (Private Collection)
"Dör för dig" (acoustic)	2024	9		In Memory of Some Stand Up Guys (Private Collection)
"Kriminell"	2024	80		In Memory of Some Stand Up Guys (Private Collection)
"Bella"	2024	— (Note: "Bella" did not enter the Swedish Singellista Chart, but peaked at number one on the Swedish Heatseeker Chart.)		In Memory of Some Stand Up Guys (Private Collection)
"—" denotes a recording that did not chart or was not released in that territory.

== See also ==
- List of murdered hip hop musicians
