= EPA tractor =

Self-constructed Swedish vehicle

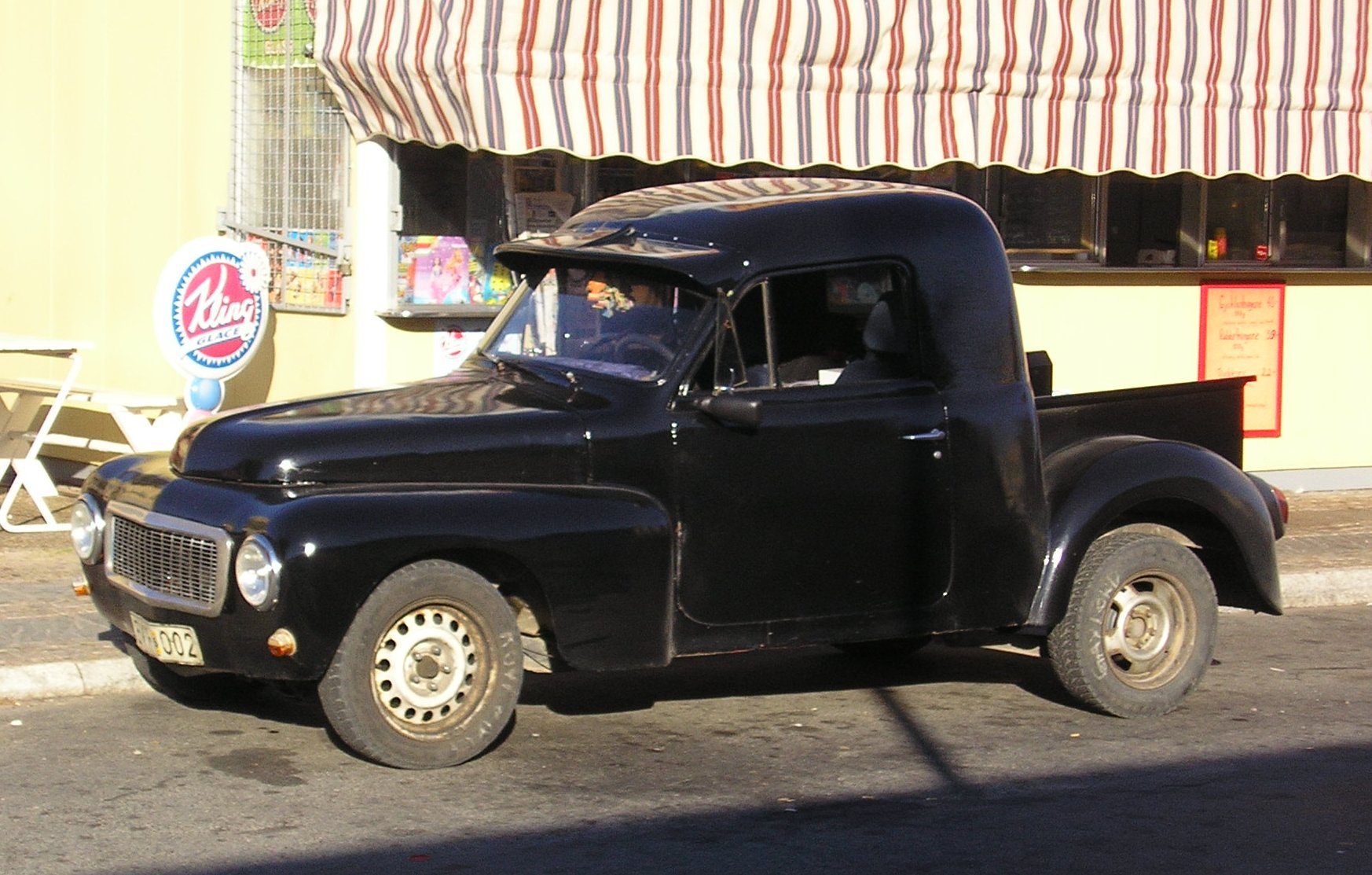
EPA tractor based on a Volvo Duett (Volvo PV445)

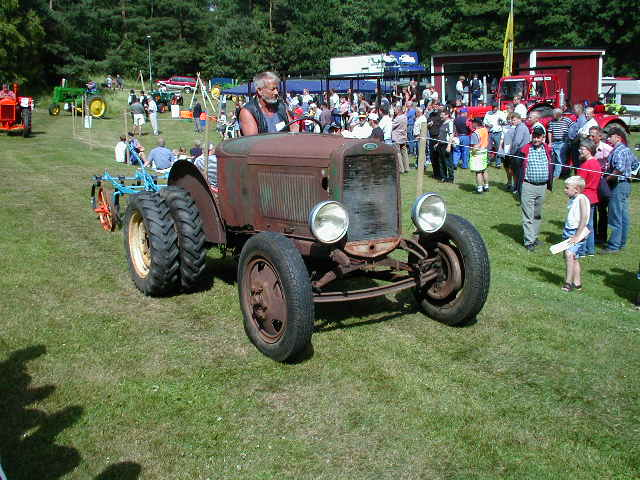
A former Ford Model A converted into an EPA tractor

An EPA tractor is a type of agricultural tractor in Sweden, made from a converted production vehicle or vehicle remains. Later, EPA tractors were converted and used primarily by young people in rural areas, as they were limited to a design-related top speed of 30 km/h (19 mph) and could be driven from the age of 15 with a moped license. The EPA tractors were replaced by the so-called A-tractors in 1975 and continue to enjoy great popularity among young people in Sweden.

== Name ==
The name EPA tractor is derived from EPA, for Enhetsprisaktiebolaget, Enhetspris AB, the name of a discount supermarket chain which was very well-known in Sweden in the 1950s and 1960s. This expressed the fact that these were inexpensively manufactured vehicles of simple design and quality. The word traktor is used in Sweden for agricultural machines and tractors, similar to the meanings in German and English (as tractor).

== History ==
The construction and use of EPA tractors began in the late 1920s, and they became more common in Sweden in the 1930s. On 31 May 1940, a separate law (1940:440) was passed for the conversion and use of these EPA tractors, and on 1 July 1952, mandatory registration for EPA tractors was introduced.

Due to the economic changes in Sweden after World War II and the now more cost-effective use of mass-produced tractors from well-known manufacturers in Sweden, many EPA tractors were decommissioned and then used by young people. This led to a renewed increase in the number of EPA tractors in the 1960s and 1970s. In 1963, A-tractors were introduced as an alternative to EPA tractors, but they were subject to stricter requirements and therefore attracted little interest among young people. EPA tractors were to be banned on 31 March 1975, and completely replaced by A-tractors by March 1978 because the Swedish government considered EPA tractors a traffic and accident risk. After protests and the collection of approximately 6,800 signatures, the government changed its plan in 1978, merging the regulations for EPA tractors and A-tractors, and allowing their continued use – even by young people – to this day.

By 2020, approximately 12,000 A-tractors (EPA tractors) were said to be in operation in Sweden. On 15 July 2020, the Swedish Ministry of Infrastructure eased the technical requirements for converting to an A-class tractor, and around 36,000 are now said to be in operation.

== Conversion to an EPA tractor ==
The requirements for building an EPA tractor or converting a standard motor vehicle into an EPA tractor were a load-bearing frame and no self-supporting body, the distance between the wheel axles (wheelbase) could not exceed 225 cm (89 in), no rear axle suspension, reduction of seating to one row, creation of a loading area, installation of a trailer hitch, permanent and irreversible restriction of engine power and thus driving speed (maximum gear ratio of 1:10 between wheels and engine). From 1 July 1970, EPA tractors were required to have special requirements for the cab or a roll bar.
