= Rasmus Gozzi =

Swedish singer and songwriter

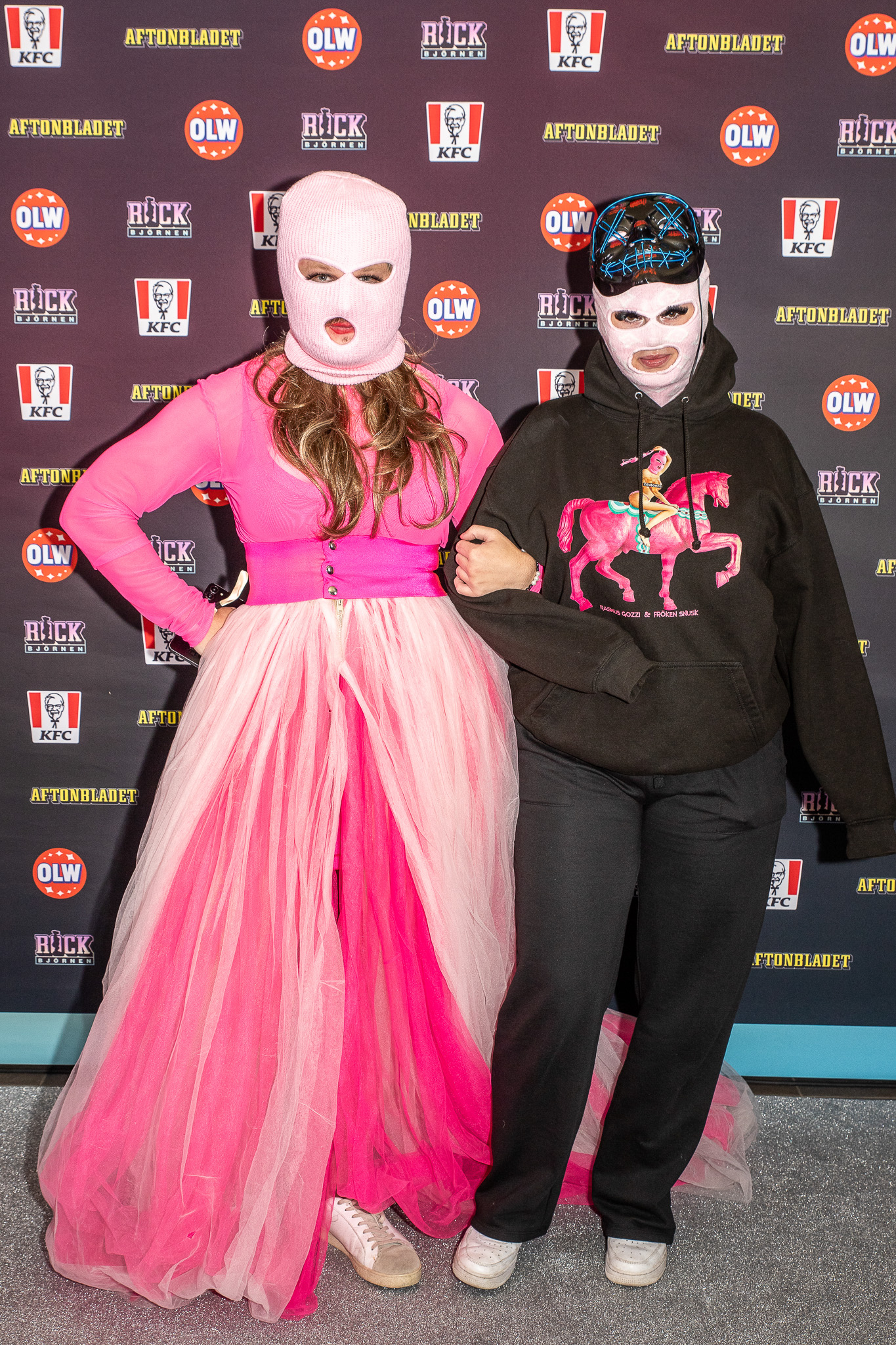
- Gozzi (left) and Fröken Snusk in 2024, dressed up as each other

Background information
- Born: Rasmus Eric Uselius; 14 April 1993 (age 33); Uppsala, Sweden
- Genre: Epadunk
- Occupations: singer-songwriter, DJ and record producer
- Label: Gozzi Records

Eric Gozzi Uselius (born April 14, 1993 as Rasmus Eric Uselius), better known as Rasmus Gozzi, is a Swedish singer, songwriter, DJ and record producer. He started his music career in 2016, and has co-written songs with Louise Andersson Bodin. He is well known for his extensive collaboration with Fröken Snusk, and has also worked with Lazee and Sean Kingston. Gozzi has been associated with the music genre Epadunk. Basshunter inspired Gozzi to make music. Gozzi lives outside Uppsala with his son.

== Discography ==
=== Albums ===
Title	Details	Peak chart positions
Title	Details	SWE
Jag vill ha dig här hos mig (with Fröken Snusk)	Released: 25 March 2022; Label: Gozzi; Formats: Digital download, streaming	18

=== Singles ===
Title	Year	Peak chart positions		Album
Title	Year	SWE	NOR	Album
"Klamydia"	2020	85	—	Non-album singles
"Strypsex i ditt garage"	2021	21	—	Non-album singles
"Ingen Albatraóz i min raggarbil"	2021	91	—	Non-album singles
"Äckligt"	2021	— (Note: "Äckligt" did not enter the Swedish Singellista Chart, but peaked at number 11 on the Swedish Heatseeker Chart.)	—	Non-album singles
"Fuck Off and Die"	2021	— (Note: "Fuck Off and Die" did not enter the Swedish Singellista Chart, but peaked at number 13 on the Swedish Heatseeker Chart.)	—	Non-album singles
"Daddy" (with Lurifaks and Fröken Snusk)	2021	— (Note: "Daddy" did not enter the Swedish Singellista Chart, but peaked at number 12 on the Swedish Heatseeker Chart.)	—	Non-album singles
"Oskuld" (with Fröken Snusk)	2021	— (Note: "Oskuld" did not enter the Swedish Singellista Chart, but peaked at number eight on the Swedish Heatseeker Chart.)	—	Non-album singles
"Fröken Snusk" (with Fröken Snusk and Lurifaks)	2021	— (Note: "Fröken Snusk" did not enter the Swedish Singles Chart, but peaked at number nine on the Swedish Heatseeker chart.)	—	Non-album singles
"Jag vill ha dig här hos mig" (with Fröken Snusk)	2022	— (Note: "Jag vill ha dig här hos mig" did not enter the Swedish Singellista Chart, but peaked at number 20 on the Swedish Heatseeker Chart.)	—	Jag vill ha dig här hos mig
"Rid mig som en dalahäst" (with Fröken Snusk)	2022	1	—	Jag vill ha dig här hos mig
"Om han bjuder bubbel" (with Fröken Snusk and Jeppson)	2022	61	—	Non-album singles
"Dyr bensin" (with Fröken Snusk)	2022	— (Note: "Dyr bensin" did not enter the Swedish Singellista Chart, but peaked at number 14 on the Swedish Heatseeker Chart.)	—	Non-album singles
"Snurrar som ett hjul" (with Fröken Snusk)	2022	46	—	Non-album singles
"Jag ska bli kvinna inatt" (with Fröken Snusk)	2022	81	—	Non-album singles
"Jag vet vad du vill" (with Fröken Snusk)	2022	— (Note: "Jag vet vad du vill" did not enter the Swedish Singellista Chart, but peaked at number 12 on the Swedish Heatseeker Chart.)	—	Non-album singles
"Strippa i ditt vardagsrum" (with Fröken Snusk)	2022	76	—	Non-album singles
"Raggarhimlen" (with Fröken Snusk, or with Fröken Snusk and Halva Priset)	2023	11	24	Non-album singles
"Trakten till epan" (with Fröken Snusk and 1.Cuz)	2023	5	—	Non-album singles
"Höjer våra glas igen" (with De Vet Du)	2023	27	—	Non-album singles
"Turn Me On" (with Ringnes-Ronny and Fröken Snusk)	2023	— (Note: "Turn Me On" did not enter the Swedish Singellista Chart, but peaked at number one on the Swedish Heatseeker Chart.)	—	Non-album singles
"Homofil" (with Fröken Snusk)	2023	— (Note: "Homofil" did not enter the Swedish Singellista Chart, but peaked at number 16 on the Swedish Heatseeker Chart.)	—	Non-album singles
"Luft för mig" (with Fröken Snusk and Coola Kids)	2023	— (Note: "Luft för mig" did not enter the Swedish Singellista Chart, but peaked at number two on the Swedish Heatseeker Chart.)	—	Non-album singles
"Raggarbil" (with Fröken Snusk)	2023	50	—	Non-album singles
"Min kära mamma" (with Fröken Snusk)	2023	76	—	Non-album singles
"Epa-Dunk" (with Fröken Snusk and Jeppson)	2023	98	—	Non-album singles
"Sojapojken" (with Fröken Snusk)	2023	— (Note: "Sojapojken" did not enter the Swedish Singellista Chart, but peaked at number two on the Swedish Heatseeker Chart.)	—	Non-album singles
"Nu är jag din bukis" (with Fröken Snusk)	2023	— (Note: "Nu är jag din bukis" did not enter the Swedish Singellista Chart, but peaked at number 15 on the Swedish Heatseeker Chart.)	—	Non-album singles
"Raggartjej" (with Baddies and Fröken Snusk)	2023	34	31	Non-album singles
"Hjärtat på flygsplansläge" (with Fröken Snusk and Jone)	2023	99	—	Non-album singles
"Inga fingrar ner i halsen" (with Fröken Snusk)	2023	— (Note: "Inga fingrar ner i halsen" did not enter the Swedish Singellista Chart, but peaked at number one on the Swedish Heatseeker Chart.)	—	Non-album singles
"Frökens Nikotin" (with Fröken Snusk)	2023	100	—	Non-album singles
"Fel namn" (with Fröken Snusk)	2023	72	—	Non-album singles
"Krypa hem" (with Jeppson and Fröken Snusk)	2023	59	—	Non-album singles
"Gustav Vasa (Norge varit Svenskt)" (with Fröken Snusk and Gustav Vasa)	2023	— (Note: "Gustav vasa (Norge varit Svenskt)" did not enter the Swedish Singellista Chart, but peaked at number four on the Swedish Heatseeker Chart.)	—	Non-album singles
"Midsommarstånd (Bas & fiol)" (with Fröken Snusk)	2023	81	—	Non-album singles
"Kung i baren" (with Fröken Snusk and Kuselofte)	2023	— (Note: "Kung i baren" did not enter the Swedish Singellista Chart, but peaked at number seven on the Swedish Heatseeker Chart.)	—	Non-album singles
"Otrogen" (with Fröken Snusk)	2023	— (Note: "Otrogen" did not enter the Swedish Singellista Chart, but peaked at number one on the Swedish Heatseeker Chart.)	—	Non-album singles
"Natt till dag" (with Ringnes-Ronny Fröken Snusk)	2023	78	—	Non-album singles
"Värdelös" (with Fröken Snusk and B3nte)	2023	— (Note: "Värdelös" did not enter the Swedish Singellista Chart, but peaked at number four on the Swedish Heatseeker Chart.)	—	Non-album singles
"Raggarbilar (Warra Warra)" (with Danjal and Fröken Snusk)	2023	3	—	Non-album singles
"Gynekologen" (with Fröken Snusk)	2023	50	—	Non-album singles
"Tuta" (with Fröken Snusk)	2023	— (Note: "Tuta" did not enter the Swedish Singellista Chart, but peaked at number 17 on the Swedish Heatseeker Chart.)	—	Non-album singles
"Tonårsnatt" (with Fröken Snusk and DJ Roine)	2023	— (Note: "Tonårsnatt" did not enter the Swedish Singellista Chart, but peaked at number four on the Swedish Heatseeker Chart.)	—	Non-album singles
"Skeva bil" (with Fröken Snusk and Daddy D)	2023	62	—	Non-album singles
"Fara för trafiken" (with Fröken Snusk)	2023	— (Note: "Fara för trafiken" did not enter the Swedish Singellista Chart, but peaked at number 18 on the Swedish Heatseeker Chart.)	—	Non-album singles
"Följa dig hem" (with Fröken Snusk)	2023	— (Note: "Följa dig hem" did not enter the Swedish Singellista Chart, but peaked at number one on the Swedish Heatseeker Chart.)	—	Non-album singles
"Välkommen till byn" (with Fröken Snusk)	2023	— (Note: "Välkommen till byn" did not enter the Swedish Singellista Chart, but peaked at number 14 on the Swedish Heatseeker Chart.)	—	Non-album singles
"Dansar aldrig nykter" (with Fröken Snusk)	2023	— (Note: "Dansar aldrig nykter" did not enter the Swedish Singellista Chart, but peaked at number two on the Swedish Heatseeker Chart.)	—	Non-album singles
"Ingen censur" (with Fröken Snusk)	2023	— (Note: "Ingen censur" did not enter the Swedish Singellista Chart, but peaked at number two on the Swedish Heatseeker Chart.)	—	Non-album singles
"Då målar vi om" (with Fröken Snusk)	2023	99	—	Non-album singles
"Grisarna till bacon" (with Fröken Snusk)	2023	— (Note: "Grisarna till bacon" did not enter the Swedish Singellista Chart, but peaked at number 14 on the Swedish Heatseeker Chart.)	—	Non-album singles
"Feliz Navidad" (with Fröken Snusk and Danjal)	2023	29	—	Non-album singles
"Frimärke" (with Fröken Snusk)	2023	— (Note: "Frimärke" did not enter the Swedish Singellista Chart, but peaked at number 14 on the Swedish Heatseeker Chart.)	—	Non-album singles
"Sockerpullan" (with Fröken Snusk)	2024	— (Note: "Sockerpullan" did not enter the Swedish Singellista Chart, but peaked at number 18 on the Swedish Heatseeker Chart.)	—	Non-album singles
"Alla jag legat med"	2024	— (Note: "Alla jag legat med" did not enter the Swedish Singellista Chart, but peaked at number 19 on the Swedish Heatseeker Chart.)	—	Non-album singles
"Weed i raggarbil" (with Fröken Snusk and Emilush featuring Snoop Dogg)	2024	27	—	Non-album singles
"Voi till min fuckboi" (with Fröken Snusk)	2024	— (Note: "Voi till min fuckboi" did not enter the Swedish Singellista Chart, but peaked at number six on the Swedish Heatseeker Chart.)	—	Non-album singles
"Dräng & dalatjej" (with Drängarna and Froken Snusk)	2024	68	—	Non-album singles
"Vad gör du nu" (with Fröken Snusk and Emil Assergård)	2024	91	—	Non-album singles
"Hawk Tuah" (with Fröken Snusk)	2024	— (Note: "Hawk Tuah" did not enter the Swedish Singellista Chart, but peaked at number three on the Swedish Heatseeker Chart.)	—	Non-album singles
"Gå vidare" (with Fröken Snusk and Antik)	2024	— (Note: "Gå vidare" did not enter the Swedish Singellista Chart, but peaked at number 16 on the Swedish Heatseeker Chart.)	—	Non-album singles
"Eloise" (with Fröken Snusk)	2025	— (Note: "Eloise" did not enter the Swedish Singellista Chart, but peaked at number four on the Swedish Heatseeker Chart.)	—	Non-album singles
"Explodera" (with Fröken Snusk)	2025	— (Note: "Explodera" did not enter the Swedish Singellista Chart, but peaked at number 15 on the Swedish Heatseeker Chart.)	—	Non-album singles
"Vi är gul och blå – VM låt 2026" (with Fröken Snusk and Edi'Vibz)	2026	5	—	Non-album singles
"Så länge som mitt hjärta slår" (with Fröken Snusk and Åkezzonz)	2026	41	—	Non-album singles
"Om du frågar Nooshi" (with Fröken Snusk and Louise Andersson Bodin)	2026	1	—	Non-album singles
"Magdalena (Aldrig sur)" (with Fröken Snusk and Louise Andersson Bodin)	2026	54	—	Non-album singles
