= Lucianoz =

Swedish singer (born 1993)

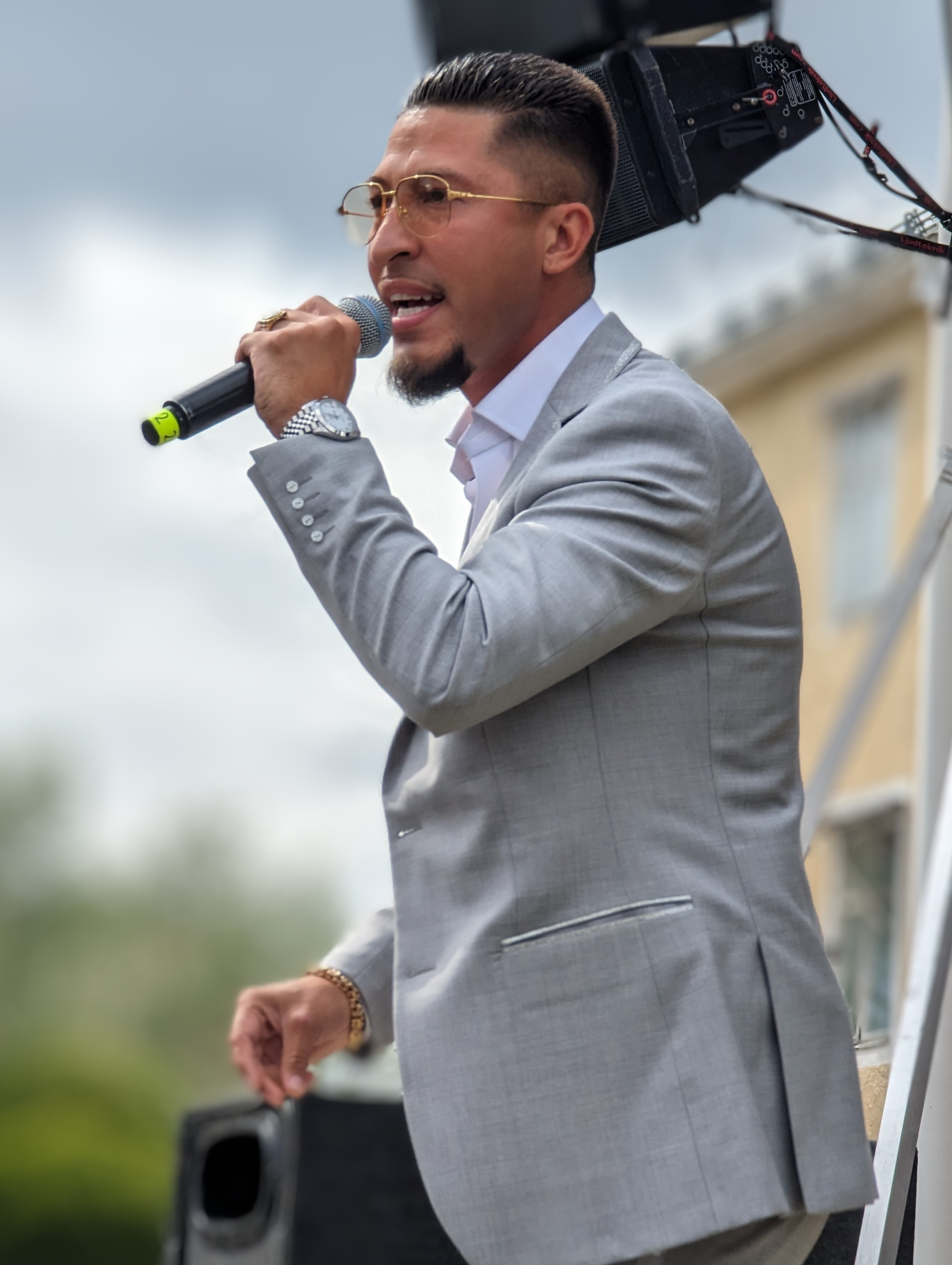
- Lucianoz performing in 2023
- Born: Luciano Jerry Axelsson; 13 May 1993 (age 31); Stockholm, Sweden
- Occupation: Singer
- Musical career
- Genres: Dansband
- Instruments: Vocals
- Labels: Sony

Luciano Jerry Axelsson (born 13 May 1993), known professionally as Lucianoz, is a Swedish singer.

== Biography ==
Lucianoz was born in Rinkeby, an immigrant-majority district of Stockholm, in 1993. From childhood, he was influenced by his parents who often listened to dansband artists such as Stefan Borsch and Flamingokvintetten. He first attempted to begin his music career as a rhythm and blues artist, and auditioned in this style with limited success on Swedish Idol.

In October 2022, Lucianoz amassed a large following on TikTok after a video his sister recorded of him singing Stefan Borshs's "Det är ju dej jag går och väntar på" went viral and quickly received hundreds of thousands of views. This led to Lucianoz releasing a full cover of the song on Spotify, securing his first record deal, and making several appearances on Swedish television. Within months, he was invited to Melodifestivalen, Sweden's preselection competition for the Eurovision Song Contest, to perform a tribute to Pernilla Wahlgren with a dansband cover of "Piccadilly Circus". It was Lucianoz's first time performing in-person before a large public audience.

In the spring of 2023, Lucianoz went on tour in Sweden. During the summer, he performed on Allsång på Skansen as well as at the Victoria Days celebration on Öland. In June 2023, Swedish television channel TV4 announced the production of a documentary series about Lucianoz, set to be released in the fall of 2023.
