= Hooja =

Swedish musical duo

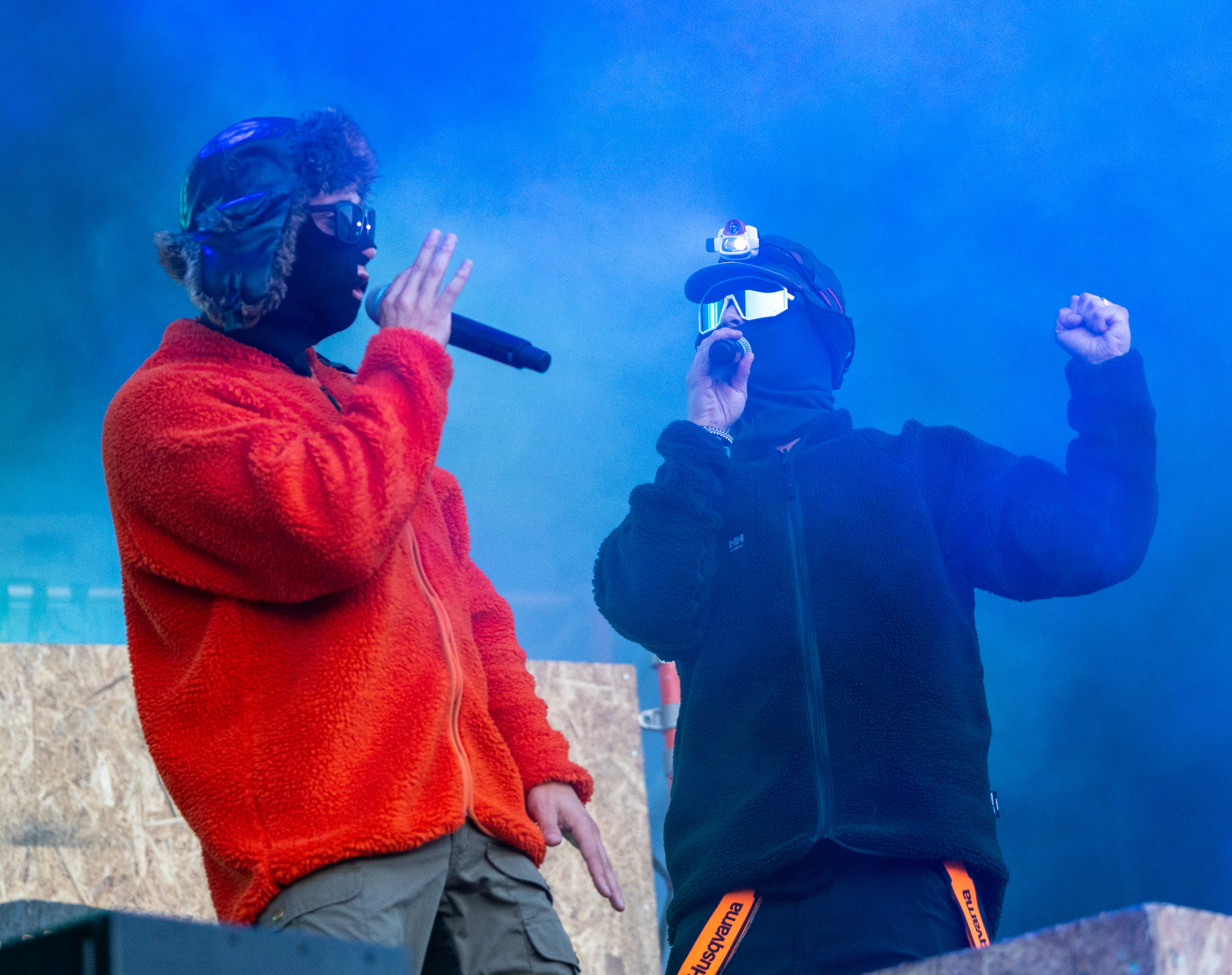
- Hooja in 2024

Background information
- Origin: Gällivare, Sweden
- Genres: Epadunk
- Years active: 2021–present
- Labels: Roxy Recordings; Playground Music
- Members: Hooja; DJ Mårdhund
- Website: www.instagram.com/hoojahooja/

Hooja is a Swedish electronic music duo. Consisting of Hooja and DJ Mårdhund, the duo's identities were unknown the first years. In July 2023, their identities were revealed by the Swedish newspaper Aftonbladet.

Hooja has been associated with the music genre Epadunk.

== Discography ==
=== Compilation albums ===
- Hooja (2024) – No. 12 Sweden

=== Singles ===
List of singles, with selected chart positions
Title	Year	Peak chart positions
Title	Year	SWE
"Donkey Kong"	2021	22
"Banan Melon Kiwi & Citron"	2021	5
"På disco"	2021	—
"Levererar"	2021	—
"Där gäddan simmar"	2021	76
"In i dimman"	2022	—
"Polers"	2022	44
"Livet på en pinne"	2022	9
"Går det bra?"	2022	31
"Jukkasjärvi"	2022	—
"Skogsrejv"	2022	—
"Mer & mer"	2022	3
"När radion dånar"	2022	9
"Dit älven går"	2022	9
"Kommer du ihåg?"	2023	5
"Pantamaskineriet (Pantamera)"	2023	57
"Happis"	2023	16
"Grusväg"	2023	18
"Diskoteka"	2023	3
"Försöker le"	2023	7
"Flyga som en ripa" (from Ett sista race)	2023	66
"Gammal i gemet"	2024	30
"Mayday (Fjällräddningspatrullen)"	2024	19
"Vem fan e du?" (with Miriam Bryant)	2024	1
"En gång till"	2024	38
"Dränk den"	2024	40
"Försöker le" (with Moonica Mac)	2024	—
"San Francisco Boy" (with Käärijä)	2025	4
"Ojojoj"	2025	10
"Banananas"	2025	20
"Uppenbart"	2025	30
"Få men samlad"	2025	19
"Spelsmanslag"	2025	81
"Blåtandssnäcka"	2026	74
"Be with U" (with Little Sis Nora)	2026	70
"Pernilla på polisen"	2026	— (Note: "Pernilla på polisen" did not enter the Swedish Singellista chart, but peaked at number 1 on the Swedish Heatseeker chart.)
