= Fröken Snusk =

Swedish music artist

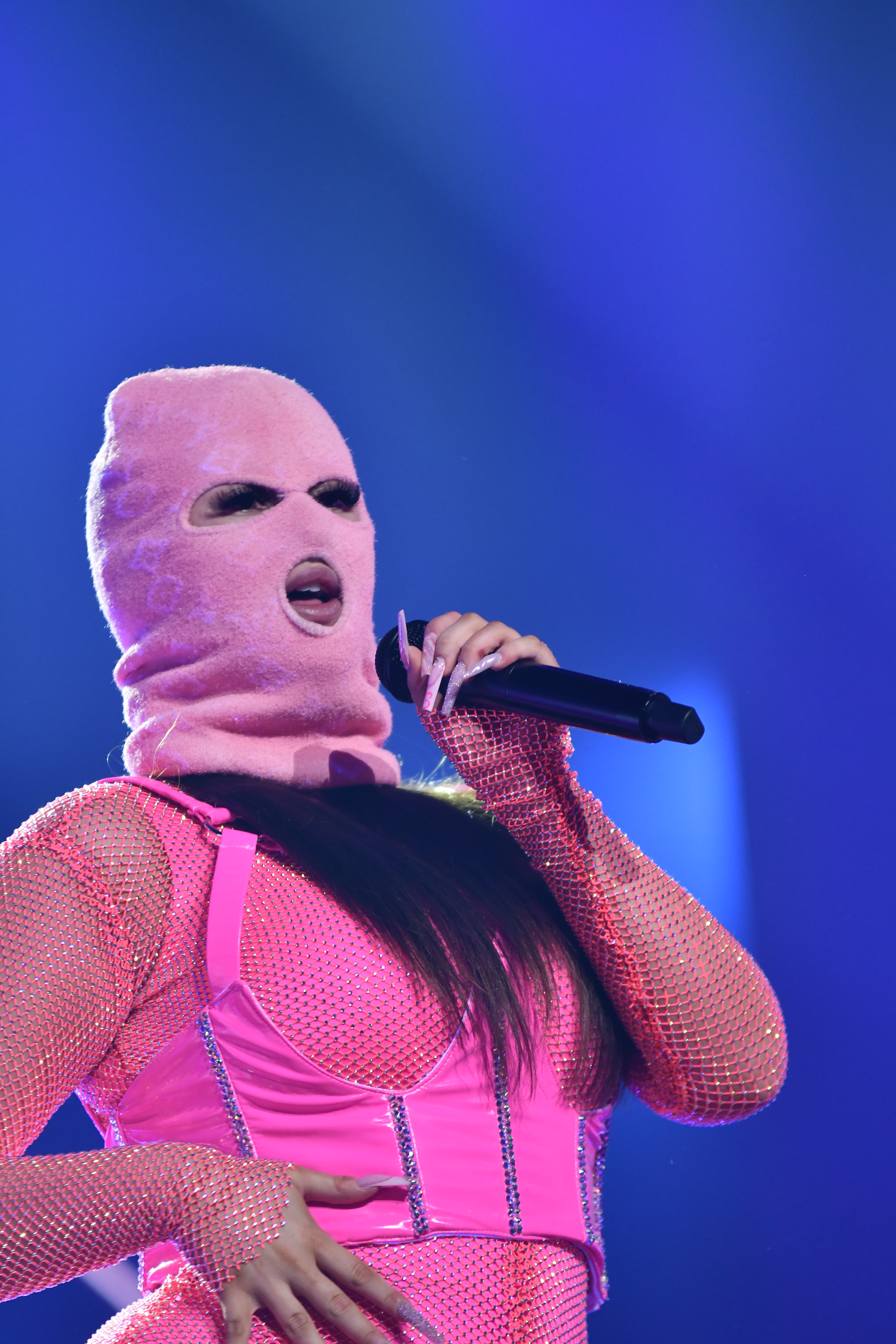
- Felicia Eriksson performing as Fröken Snusk at Melodifestivalen 2024

Background information
- Genre: Epadunk
- Years active: 2022–present
- Label: Gozzi
- Members: Rasmus Gozzi; Unidentified female singer
- Past members: Felicia Eriksson

Fröken Snusk (transl. Miss Smut) is a Swedish musical act and persona created by songwriter and producer Rasmus Gozzi. The character is known for wearing a pink balaclava to maintain anonymity and gained widespread popularity after competing in Melodifestivalen 2024 with the song "Unga & fria". Originally portrayed by Felicia Eriksson, the role was taken over by a new unidentified performer in April 2025 after Eriksson transitioned to a solo career.

== Career ==
The original Fröken Snusk claimed to have been born in 2004 or 2005, while Aftonbladet claimed she was slightly older. As her stage name implies, her songs often have crude and sexual lyrics. In 2023, she collaborated with the gangster rapper 1.Cuz on the song "Trakten till epan" and also participated in Musikhjälpen.

She took part in Melodifestivalen 2024, and was eliminated in the runoff voting round. Rasmus Gozzi has worked on several songs with Fröken Snusk. She sings and performs mainly the music style epadunk.

In May 2024, she won the fourth season of Masked Singer Sverige.

In April 2025, the original singer for Fröken Snusk was replaced by a different singer, provoking backlash from the public and concert promoters. Later that month, Expressen revealed the identity of the original singer as 23-year-old Felicia Eriksson from Stockholm.

== Discography ==
Charting solo singles (Felicia Eriksson)
Title	Year	Peak chart positions	Album
Title	Year	SWE	Album
"Rid mig som en dalahäst"	2022	1	Non-album singles
"Unga & fria"	2024	1	Non-album singles
"Voi till min fuckboi" (with Rasmus Gozzi)	2024	— (Note: "Voi till min fuckboi" did not enter the Swedish Singellista Chart, but peaked at number six on the Swedish Heatseeker Chart.)	Non-album singles
"Dö" (with Loam)	2024	41	Non-album singles
"Black Widow"	2025	14	Non-album singles
"Om du frågar Nooshi" (with Rasmus Gozzi and Louise Andersson Bodin)	2026	1	Non-album singles
"Magdalena (Aldrig sur)" (with Rasmus Gozzi and Louise Andersson Bodin)	2026	54	Non-album singles
