= Unga & fria =

Single by Fröken Snusk
- Released: 10 February 2024
- Length: 3:02
- Label: Iconic Music
- Songwriters: Sara Ryan; Fröken Snusk
- Producer: Fröken Snusk

Fröken Snusk singles chronology
"Rid mig som en Hollywoodfru" (2024)	"Unga & fria" (2024)	"Sockerpullan" (2024)

"Unga & fria" (English: "Young & Free") is a song by Swedish singer Fröken Snusk, released as a single on 10 February 2024. It was performed in Melodifestivalen 2024, after which it reached number one on the Swedish singles chart.

== Charts ==
Chart performance for "Unga & fria"
Chart (2024)	Peak position
Sweden (Sverigetopplistan)	1
