= Dom ska veta =

Studio album by Molly Sandén
- Released: 7 May 2021
- Genre: Pop
- Length: 34:26
- Language: Swedish
- Label: Milkshake; Sony Music Sweden
- Producer: Victor Thell; Pontus Persson; John Alexis; Elvira Anderfjärd; Oskar Linnros; Hampus Lindvall

Molly Sandén chronology
Det bästa kanske inte hänt än (2019)	Dom ska veta (2021)	Allting däremellan (2023)

Singles from Dom ska veta
- 1. "Jag mår bra nu" Released: 4 September 2020; 2. "Kärlek slutar alltid med bråk" Released: 22 January 2021; 3. "Nån annan nu" Released: 26 March 2021; 4. "Vi ska aldrig gå hem" Released: 30 September 2021

Dom ska veta is the fifth studio album by Swedish pop singer Molly Sandén, released on 7 May 2021 by Milkshake and Sony Music Sweden. The album charted atop the Swedish Albums Chart and also appeared on the Swedish Albums Year-end chart in 2021, and 2022, charting at number 14 and 30, respectively. The album's production was handled by Victor Thell, Elvira Anderfjärd, Pontus Persson, John Alexis, Hampus Lindvall and Oskar Linnros, while it was written by Sandén, Smith & Thell, Jonathan Johansson, David Larsson, Anderfjärd, Alexis, and Daniela Rathana, among others. For the album, Sandén won the Rockbjörnen for Female Artist of the Year in 2021, which was her third win in that category.

== Background and promotion ==
=== Magazine ===
In conjunction with the release of Dom ska veta, Sandén released a magazine with the same name. It consisted of 260 pages and 2,000 copies were made. The magazine included all lyrics from the songs on the album, along with exclusive material such as Sandén's own photos from analog photo albums, handwritten notes, screenshots of email conversations, diabetes stickers, (Note: Sandén was diagnosed with Type 1 diabetes in 2012.) and Sandén's interviews with other artists.

=== Singles ===
The album was preceded by three singles. The first single, "Jag mår bra nu", featuring Newkid, was released on 4 September 2020 and peaked at number four on the Swedish Singles Chart. The second single, "Kärlek slutar alltid med bråk", was released on 22 January 2021 and peaked at number 17 on the same chart, while the third single "Nån annan nu" was released on 26 March 2021 and peaked at number four. A fourth single, "Vi ska aldrig gå hem", was released on 30 September 2021, following the album's release, and was added on as the album's last track; it peaked at number six.

=== Tour ===
In February 2022, Sandén embarked on the Dom ska veta Arena Tour, consisting of 13 concerts in Sweden. It began on 4 February 2022 in Gothenburg (Scandinavium) and concluded in Malmö (Malmö Arena) on 19 March the same year.

== Critical reception ==
Professional ratings
Review scores
Source	Rating
Aftonbladet	4/5 stars
Borås Tidning	3/5 stars
Dagens Nyheter	4/5
Göteborgs-Posten	4/5 stars

Natasha Azarmi of Aftonbladet gave the album a positive review, calling the title track "Dom ska veta" one of "Sandén's best tracks yet". Azarmi described the production on the record as "low-key, yet razor-sharp and compelling" and opined that Sandén's vocals are delivered with "precision and confidence". Karin Grönroos of Borås Tidning highlighted "Dom ska veta", "E du där", "Lillebror" and "10 000 timmar" as the best tracks on the album, while criticizing the album's lack of cohesion and hit potential. Grönroos wrote that "the album never feels truly cohesive, simply because the lyrics are allowed to explore so many different angles. The end result does indeed paint an effective portrait of Molly Sandén, but at the expense of direct hit potential". Writing for Dagens Nyheter, Sara Martinsson compared Sandén's work on the album to that of Robyn, noting that the track "Nån annan nu" references Robyn's "Dancing on My Own". Martinsson opined that Sandén "sometimes lingers unnecessarily on the past", stating that "just like Robyn, Sandén also feels the need to process, through her artistry, the fact that she became famous at a young age [...] This preoccupation with the past is understandable, but somewhat unnecessary". Johan Lindqvist of Göteborgs-Posten compared the album favorably to previous releases from Sandén, stating that it's musically varied, "smart, and well-produced as Molly Sandén, even more clearly than before, combines modern, urban pop music with a touch of classic Swedish schlager". Lindqvist described the album as a summary of Sandén's life experiences, and deemed it "a very good pop record".

== Track listing ==
Dom ska veta track listing
No.	Title	Writer(s)	Producer(s)	Length
1.	"Dom ska veta"	Victor Thell; Jonathan Johansson; Molly Sandén	Thell	1:55
2.	"Fucking Stockholm"	John Alexis; Johansson; Sandén; Pontus Persson	Persson; Alexis	3:22
3.	"Nån annan nu"	Thell; David Larson; Maria Jane Smith; Sandén	Thell	3:20
4.	"Noice Cancellation"	Elvira Anderfjärd; Sandén	Aderfjärd	3:17
5.	"E du där" (featuring Daniela Rathana)	Elias Kapari; Rathana; Johansson; Sandén; Oskar Linnros	Linnros	3:25
6.	"Fotoalbum"	Alexis; Sandén; Persson	Persson; Alexis	3:28
7.	"Lillebror"	Anderfjärd; Johansson; Sandén	Anderfjärd	2:49
8.	"Kärlek slutar alltid med bråk"	Linnéa Södahl; Anderfjärd; Sandén	Anderfjärd	3:07
9.	"Dag för dag"	Södahl; Hampus Lindvall; Sandén	Lindvall	3:32
10.	"10 000 timmar"	Thell; Johansson; Sandén	Thell	2:58
11.	"Jag mår bra nu" (featuring Newkid)	Thell; Alex Ferrer; Kevin Högdahl; Sandén	Thell	3:07
Total length:				34:26

Dom ska veta digital rerelease additional track
No.	Title	Writer(s)	Producer	Length
12.	"Vi ska aldrig gå hem"	Thell; Sandén	Thell	3:15
Total length:				37:41

== Charts ==
=== Weekly charts ===
Weekly chart performance for Dom ska veta
Chart (2021–2023)	Peak position
Swedish Albums (Sverigetopplistan)	1

=== Year-end charts ===
Year-end chart performance for Dom ska veta
Chart	Year	Position
Swedish Albums (Sverigetopplistan)	2021	14
Swedish Albums (Sverigetopplistan)	2022	30

== Certifications ==
Certifications for Dom ska veta
Region	Certification	Certified units/sales
Sweden (GLF)	Platinum	30,000^{‡}
^{‡} Sales+streaming figures based on certification alone.
