= Husavik (song) =

2020 song performed by Will Ferrell and My Marianne

- Cahill Remix artwork

Song by Will Ferrell and My Marianne

from the album Eurovision Song Contest: The Story of Fire Saga (Music from the Netflix Film)
- Released: June 26, 2020
- Length: 3:22
- Label: Arista; Sony Music Entertainment
- Songwriters: Fat Max Gsus; Rickard Göransson; Savan Kotecha
- Producer: Fat Max Gsus

"Husavik" (also known as "Húsavík" or "Husavik (My Hometown)") is a song performed by Will Ferrell and Molly Sandén (under the stage name My Marianne) for the film Eurovision Song Contest: The Story of Fire Saga (2020). The song was written by Fat Max Gsus, Rickard Göransson, and Savan Kotecha, and received a nomination for Best Original Song at the 93rd Academy Awards.

== Context ==
The song can be first heard when Sigrit (Rachel McAdams) is writing a song and playing the piano after returning to her hotel room. Lars (Will Ferrell) overhears Sigrit working on a new song, not knowing that it's a song she wants to dedicate to him. Lars wrongly concludes that it is a love song for Alexander (Dan Stevens), another contestant in the Eurovision Song Contest.

The song is sung during the finals of the contest. Lars arrives just in time for the grand final after asking for a ride from some initially unwilling American tourists. Instead of their official entry "Double Trouble", Sigrit and Lars perform "Husavik", an ode to their hometown. Since Fire Saga changed the song for the finals, they are disqualified from the contest but "won the hearts of the people". Lars and Sigrit kiss for the first time after performing the song.

== Accolades ==
"Husavik" was nominated for Best Original Song at the 93rd Academy Awards. It was also nominated for Best Song at the 26th Critics' Choice Awards and for Best Original Song in a Feature Film at the 11th Hollywood Music in Media Awards.

At the 2021 Society of Composers and Lyricists Awards, "Husavik" won Outstanding Original Song for Visual Media. It won the Hollywood Critics Association Awards for Best Original Song.

The town of Húsavík, after which the song is titled, has adopted the song as its local anthem.

Awards
| Award | Category | Result |
|---|---|---|
| Academy Awards | Best Original Song | Nominated |
| Critics' Choice Awards | Best Song | Nominated |
| Hollywood Music in Media Awards | Best Original Song in a Feature Film | Nominated |
| Society of Composers and Lyricists Awards | Outstanding Original Song for Visual Media | Won |
| Hollywood Critics Association Awards | Best Original Song | Won |

== Music video ==
Sandén released a music video for an acoustic version of "Husavik (My Hometown)" in August 2020. Filmed on Öland, the video features accompaniment by pianist Pontus Persson. Sandén had previously shared a performance of an acoustic version of the song through an Instagram account for her My Marianne persona; the video features piano accompaniment by David Karl Larson of the Royal Concept. As of July 2022, the music video has reached 16 million views on YouTube

== Tracklist ==
- Cahill remix

1. "Husavik (My Hometown)" (Cahill remix) – 3:51

== Charts ==
| Chart (2020) | Peak position |
|---|---|
| Australia Digital Song Sales (Billboard) | 8 |
| Hot Canadian Digital Song Sales (Billboard) | 15 |
| Euro Digital Songs (Billboard) | 12 |
| Hungary (Single Top 40) | 21 |
| Iceland (Tónlist) | 2 |
| New Zealand Hot Singles (RMNZ) | 17 |
| Scotland Singles (Official Charts) | 8 |
| Sweden (Sverigetopplistan) | 30 |
| UK Singles (Official Charts) | 59 |
| US Digital Song Sales (Billboard) | 16 |
