= Molly Sandén =

Swedish singer and actress (born 1992)

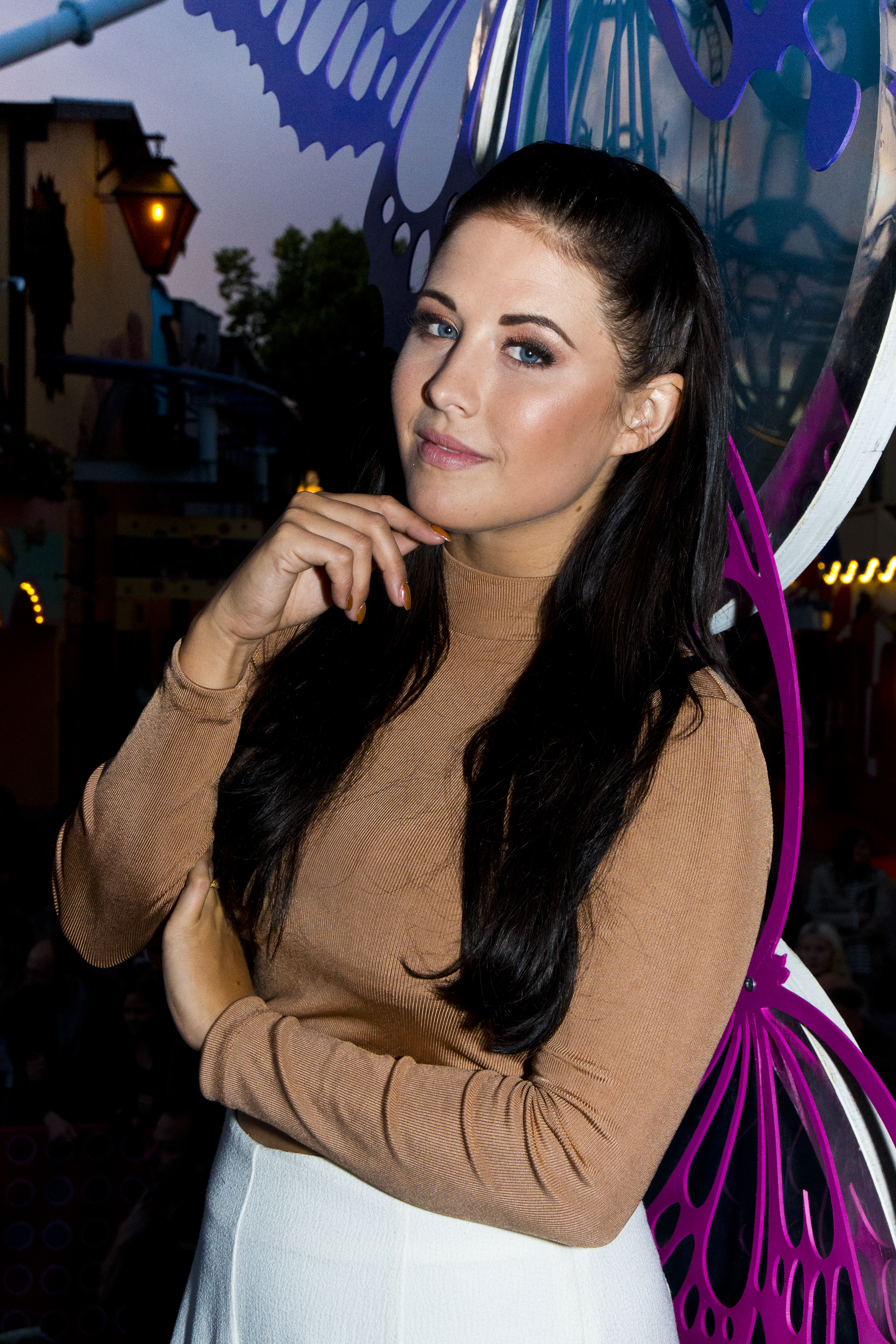
- Sandén at Sommarkrysset in 2016.

Background information
- Also known as: My Marianne
- Born: Molly My Marianne Sandén; 3 July 1992 (age 34); Huddinge, Stockholm County, Sweden
- Genres: Pop; dance-pop; R&B
- Occupations: Singer; voice actress; host
- Years active: 2004–present
- Labels: Warner Music (2009); EMI (2011–2012); Sony (2015–present)
- Website: Official website

Molly My Marianne Sandén (born 3 July 1992), also known by her middle name My Marianne, is a Swedish pop singer and voice actress. As a teenager, she represented Sweden in the Junior Eurovision Song Contest in 2006 and participated in Melodifestivalen in 2009, 2012, and 2016. Her sisters Frida and Mimmi are also singers. In 2018, Sandén released her third studio album, Större. Her fourth studio album was released in early 2019, called Det bästa kanske inte hänt än.

== Biography ==
Molly My Marianne Sandén was born in Stockholm. She attended the Adolf Fredrik's Music School. She then attended the gymnasium school Rytmus Music High School, from where she graduated in spring 2011. Sandén practised and wrote music at Helges song studio in Gävle, where she also became a member of the band Helges All Stars with Alice Svensson, Amy Diamond, Zara Larsson, and her sisters Frida and Mimmi.

== Career ==
=== 2006–2007: Junior Eurovision Song Contest ===
Sandén represented Sweden at the Junior Eurovision Song Contest in 2006, singing "Det finaste någon kan få". She came third, which remains Sweden's best result. She appeared in SVT's New Years' celebrations on 31 December 2006, which was broadcast live from Skansen. She also won the talent competition "Stellar Shots". She performed a duet with Magnus Carlsson in the song "Julens tid är här" ("Christmas time is here") on his Christmas album Spår i snön in 2006.

Sandén also met Markoolio and sang with him during this period, on his new album called Snow at Christmas rock. In summer 2007, Sandén participated in Diggiloo along with Lasse Holm, Linda Bengtzing, Lotta Engberg, Tony Roche, Charlotte Perrelli, Thomas Pettersson, Jan Johansen, Niklas Andersson, Lasse Berghagen, Benjamin Wahlgren and Magnus Johansson.

She sang a duet with Ola Svensson on a Swedish version of "You Are the Music in Me" from the Disney film High School Musical 2. They also sang in the Lilla Melodifestivalen final ahead of the Junior Eurovision Song Contest in 2007. The previous year, Sandén was chosen to present the Swedish votes during the contest.

=== 2008–2016: Melodifestivalen, and Like No One's Watching ===
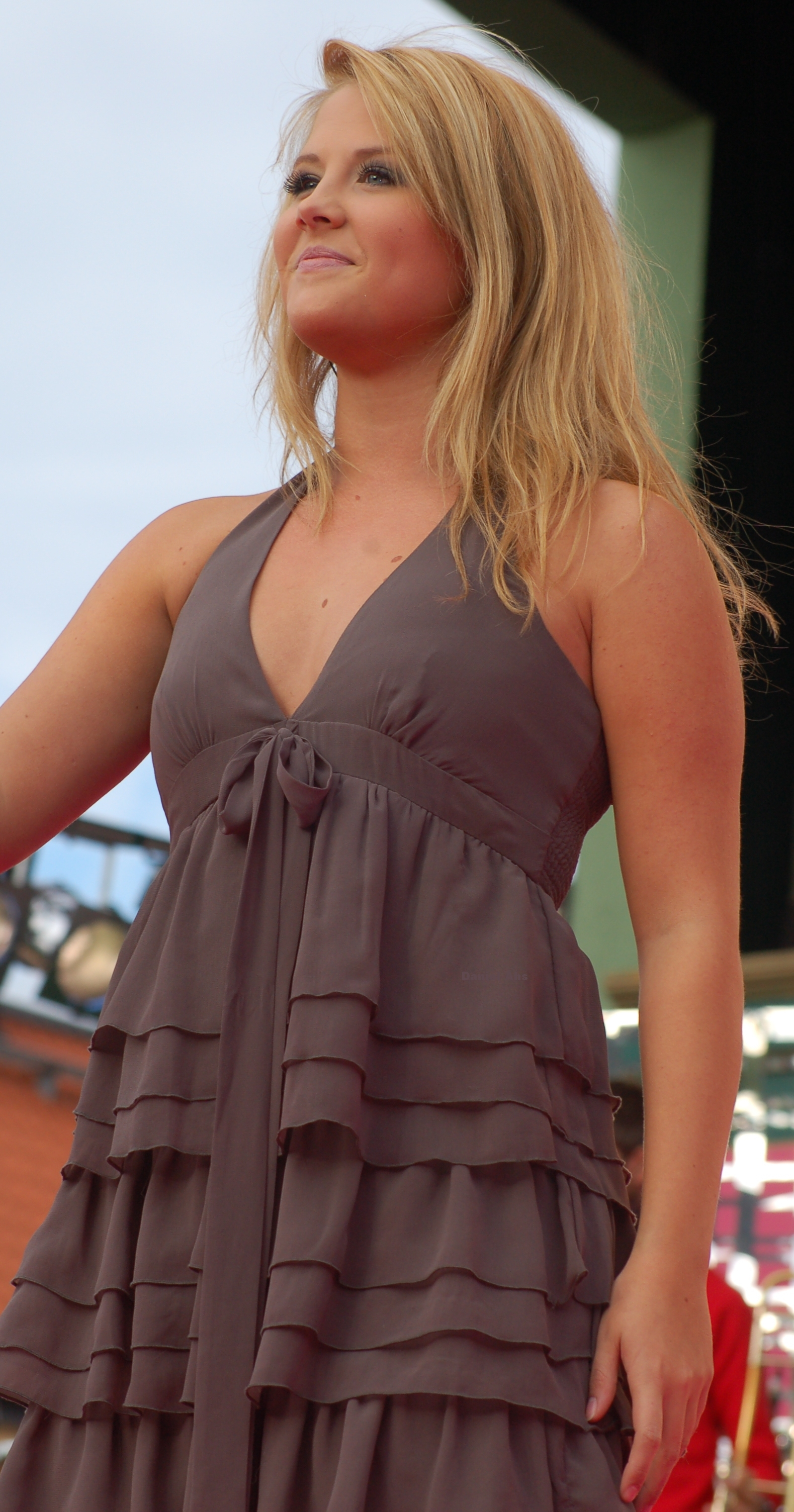
Sandén in 2008

Sandén appeared on Så ska det låta on 11 April 2008 with Magnus Bäcklund. In summer 2008, she participated again in Diggiloo with Lasse Holm, Linda Bengtzing, Lotta Engberg, Thomas Pettersson, Måns Zelmerlöw, Nanne Grönvall, Stefan and Kim and Magnus Johansson. A compilation CD was released and included her performances of "Hallelujah" and "Gabriella's song". Her cover of Dea Norberg's song "Den underbara dagen du kommer hem" was used in advertisements for the fast food chain Sibylla in 2008.

Also in 2008, Sandén participated with Janne Schaffer, Jan Johansen, Johan Boding and Sara Löfgren in Sun, Wind & Water, a tribute to Ted Gärdestad. The same year, she and Brandur released a Swedish version of the song "Right Here, Right Now" from High School Musical 3. She participated in the celebrity dancing competition Let's Dance in 2010, which was broadcast on TV4; she placed fourth.

In the 2009 Melodifestivalen, Sandén qualified for the grand final with her song "Så vill stjärnorna" but finished last with only two points, which were awarded by the international jury.

Sandén entered the Melodifestivalen again in 2012, again qualifying for the final with her song "Why Am I Crying", for which she finished in fifth place. In August 2013, Sandén announced the debut of her online clothing brand, 'My by Molly'.

She released the EP titled Like No One's Watching on 12 June 2015. It includes the hit singles "Freak", "Phoenix" and "Like No One's Watching".

In November 2015, it was announced that Sandén was to participate in the Melodifestivalen for the third time in Melodifestivalen 2016. She performed in the fourth heat in Gävle on 27 February with the song "Youniverse", which she co-wrote with Danny Saucedo and John Alexis. She qualified from the semi-finals to the final on 12 March. In the final, she placed sixth with the juries and televoting and also placed sixth overall.

=== 2017–2019: Större, and Det bästa kanske inte hänt än ===
Sandén released the studio album Större through Sony on 27 April 2018. It contains six singles. It peaked at number four in Sweden.

Sandén's fourth studio album, Det bästa kanske inte hänt än, was released on 29 May 2019 under the Sony label. The album contains nine tracks, including two singles and one promotional single. The album peaked at number two on the Swedish album chart.

=== 2020–present: Eurovision Song Contest: The Story of Fire Saga and Dom ska veta ===
In the Netflix musical film Eurovision Song Contest: The Story of Fire Saga, released in 2020, Sandén lent her voice to all songs performed by the character Sigrit Ericksdóttir, played by Rachel McAdams in the film. The film's soundtrack album, on which Sandén is heavily featured, was nominated for Best Compilation Soundtrack For Visual Media at the 63rd Annual Grammy Awards. The song "Husavik (My Hometown)" was nominated for Best Original Song at the 93rd Academy Awards. Dom ska veta, Sandén's third studio album in Swedish, was released on 7 May 2021 and was preceded by three singles: "Jag mår bra nu" with Newkid, "Kärlek slutar alltid med bråk", and "Nån annan nu".

== Personal life ==
Sandén dated Eric Saade from 2007 to 2012. Sandén was in a relationship with Danny Saucedo from February 2013 to 2019, and they were formerly engaged.

On 28 September 2012, she announced that she had been diagnosed with type 1 diabetes after collapsing while on a trip to Barcelona, Spain.

In June 2023, Sandén gave birth to her first child.

== Discography ==
=== Albums ===
==== Studio albums ====
Title	Details	Peak chart positions		Certifications
Title	Details	SWE	NOR	Certifications
Samma himmel	Released: 27 May 2009; Label: Warner Music Sweden; Format: Digital download, CD	16	—	
Unchained	Released: 23 May 2012; Label: EMI Music Sweden; Format: Digital download, CD	1	—	
Större	Released: 27 April 2018; Label: Molly Sandén AB, Sony Music; Format: Digital download, CD, LP	4	—	GLF: Platinum
Det bästa kanske inte hänt än	Released: 29 May 2019; Label: Milkshake, Sony Music; Format: Digital download, CD, LP	2	—	GLF: Platinum
Dom ska veta	Released: 7 May 2021; Label: Milkshake, Sony Music; Format: Digital download, LP	1	—	GLF: Platinum
Strawberry Blonde	Released: 13 June 2025; Label: Milkshake, Sony Music; Format: Digital download	5	22	
Blåögd	Released: 17 October 2025; Label: Milkshake, Sony Music; Format: Digital download	5	—	

==== Soundtrack albums ====
Title	Details	Peak chart positions								
Title	Details	SWE	AUS	BEL FL	ICE	NOR	UK Down.	UK OST	US	US OST
Eurovision Song Contest: The Story of Fire Saga (Music from the Netflix Film)	Released: 26 June 2020; Label: Arista, Sony; Format: Digital download	8	44	64	2	13	4	1	170	5

==== Compilation albums ====
Title	Details	Peak chart positions
Title	Details	SWE
Allting däremellan	Released: 26 October 2023; Label: Milkshake, Sony Music; Format: Digital download	8
Strawberry Blonde & Blåögd	Released: 13 November 2026; Label: Milkshake, Sony Music; Format: 2×LP	16

=== Extended plays ===
Title	Details	Peak chart positions
Title	Details	SWE
Like No One's Watching	Released: 12 June 2015; Label: Sony Music Entertainment Sweden; Format: Digital download, CD	15

=== Singles ===
==== As lead artist ====
Title	Year	Peak chart positions			Certifications	Album
Title	Year	SWE	DEN Air.	NOR	Certifications	Album
"Keep on (Movin')"	2004	—	—	—		Non-album single
"Det finaste någon kan få"	2006	—	—	—		Junior Eurovision Song Contest 2006
"Julens tid är här" (with Magnus Carlsson)	2006	—	—	—		Spår i snön
"Allt som jag kan ge" (Lilla Melodifestivalen 2007 guest performance)	2007	—	—	—		Non-album single
"Du är musiken i mig" (featuring Ola)	2007	—	—	—		High School Musical 2
"Just här, just nu" (featuring Brandur)	2008	—	—	—		High School Musical 3
"Så vill stjärnorna"	2009	11	—	—		Samma himmel
"Spread a Little Light"	2011	—	—	—		Unchained
"Why Am I Crying"	2012	8	—	—	GLF: Platinum	Unchained
"Unchained / Mirage"	2012	—	—	—		Unchained
"A Little Forgiveness" (featuring Christopher)	2012	—	—	—		Unchained / Colours
"Freak"	2014	16	—	—	GLF: Platinum	Like No One's Watching
"Phoenix"	2015	74	—	—		Like No One's Watching
"Like No One's Watching"	2015	73	—	—		Like No One's Watching
"Alla kan göra nåt" (with Mauro Scocco, Patrik Isaksson, Uno Svenningsson, Sarah Dawn Finer, Lilla Namo and Plura Jonsson)	2015	— (Note: "Alla kan göra nåt" did not enter the Swedish Singles Chart, but peaked at number nine on the Swedish Heatseeker chart.)	—	—		Non-album single
"Youniverse"	2016	8	—	—	GLF: Platinum	Melodifestivalen 2016
"Jag hatar hat" (with Magnus Carlson)	2016	—	—	—		Den långa vägen hem
"Rygg mot rygg"	2017	23	—	—	GLF: Platinum	Större
"Utan dig" (with New Kid)	2017	16	—	—	GLF: Platinum	Större
"Ditt sanna jag" (featuring Leslie Tay)	2018	35	—	—	GLF: Gold	Större
"Undanflykter"	2018	— (Note: "Undanflykter" did not enter the Swedish Singellista Chart, but peaked at number nine on the Swedish Heatseeker Chart.)	—	—		Större
"Större"	2018	17	—	—	GLF: Platinum	Större
"Sand"	2018	15	—	—	GLF: 4× Platinum	Större
"Kär i din kärlek" (Recorded at Spotify)	2018	11	—	—	GLF: Gold	Non-album singles
"Ingen som jag" (Recorded at Spotify)	2018	75	—	—		Non-album singles
"Jag e (Vierge moderne)"	2018	32	—	—		Non-album singles
"Den som e den"	2019	15	—	—	GLF: Gold	Det bästa kanske inte hänt än
"Rosa himmel" (from Störst av allt)	2019	3	—	—	GLF: 4× Platinum; IFPI Norge: Gold	Non-album single
"Va det då?"	2019	10	—	—		Det bästa kanske inte hänt än
"Det bästa kanske inte hänt än"	2019	5	—	—		Det bästa kanske inte hänt än
"Smartare" (with Estraden)	2019	28	—	—	GLF: Platinum	Mellan hägg och syrén
"Alla våra smeknamn"	2019	7	—	—		Det bästa kanske inte hänt än
"Sverige" (with Victor Leksell and Joakim Berg)	2020	11	—	—	GLF: Platinum	Non-album single
"Jag mår bra nu" (with Newkid)	2020	4	—	—		Dom ska veta
"Kärlek slutar alltid med bråk"	2021	17	—	—		Dom ska veta
"Nån annan nu"	2021	4	—	—		Dom ska veta
"Vi ska aldrig gå hem"	2021	6	—	—		Dom ska veta
"Vi:et i vinsten"	2022	8	—	—		Non-album single
"Psykos"	2023	25	—	—		Allting däremellan
"Hålla mig"	2024	11	—	—		Blåögd
"Gimme! Gimme! Gimme! (A Man After Midnight)"	2024	— (Note: "Gimme! Gimme! Gimme! (A Man After Midnight)" did not enter the Swedish Singellista Chart, but peaked at number three on the Swedish Heatseeker Chart.)	—	—		Non-album single
"Slutet av sommarn"	2024	6	—	—		Strawberry Blonde
"Lost and Found" (with Victor Leksell)	2024	1	—	—	GLF: Platinum	Blåögd
"Tur i oturen"	2025	13	—	—		Strawberry Blonde
"Konfetti" (with Astrid S)	2025	15	—	18		Strawberry Blonde
"Trophy"	2025	19	10	—		Strawberry Blonde
"Blåögd"	2025	8	10	—		Blåögd
"Superlim & silvertejp" (with Miriam Bryant)	2026	10	—	—		Non-album singles
"Tänk om" (with Victor Leksell)	2026	1	—	—		Non-album singles
"—" denotes a single that did not chart.

==== As featured artist ====
Title	Year	Peak chart positions			Album
Title	Year	SWE	DEN	NOR	Album
"Kærlighed & krig" (Burhan G featuring Molly Sandén)	2014	—	3	—	Din for evigt
"Ey gäri" (Linda Pira featuring Molly Sandén)	2016	90	—	—	Non-album single
"Regnet" (Petter featuring Molly Sandén and Sami)	2018	29	—	—	Lev nu
"Mi amor (Blåmärkshårt)" (Miriam Bryant featuring Cherrie, Molly Sandén and Stor)	2019	5	—	—	Mi amor
"Når alt ikke er nok" (Stig Brenner x Unge Ferrari featuring Molly Sandén)	2020	—	—	29	Hvite duer, sort magi
"Live on Love" (Armin van Buuren and Diane Warren featuring My Marianne)	2022	—	—	—	Feel Again, Pt. 2
"—" denotes a single that did not chart or was not released in that territory.

=== Other charted songs ===
Title	Year	Peak chart positions									Album
Title	Year	SWE	AUS Down.	CAN Down.	ICE	NZ Hot	SCO	UK	UK Down.	US Down.	Album
"Satellites"	2015	— (Note: "Satellites" did not enter the Swedish Singles Chart, but peaked at number one on the Swedish Heatseeker chart.)	—	—	—	—	—	—	—	—	Like No One's Watching
"Hata mig"	2019	27	—	—	—	—	—	—	—	—	Det bästa kanske inte hänt än
"Luften e fri"	2019	61	—	—	—	—	—	—	—	—	Det bästa kanske inte hänt än
"Spelar ingen roll"	2019	82	—	—	—	—	—	—	—	—	Det bästa kanske inte hänt än
"^Stark^"	2019	87	—	—	—	—	—	—	—	—	Det bästa kanske inte hänt än
"<& Allting där emellan>"	2019	— (Note: "<& Allting där emellan>" did not enter the Swedish Singellista Chart, but peaked at number three on the Swedish Heatseeker Chart.)	—	—	—	—	—	—	—	—	Det bästa kanske inte hänt än
"V Svag V"	2019	— (Note: "V Svag V" did not enter the Swedish Singellista Chart, but peaked at number eight on the Swedish Heatseeker Chart.)	—	—	—	—	—	—	—	—	Det bästa kanske inte hänt än
"Husavik" (Will Ferrell and My Marianne)	2020	30	8	15	2	17	8	59	6	16	Eurovision Song Contest: The Story of Fire Saga (Music from the Netflix film)
"Double Trouble" (Will Ferrell and My Marianne)	2020	69	—	—	36	—	20	76	20	—	Eurovision Song Contest: The Story of Fire Saga (Music from the Netflix film)
"JaJa Ding Dong" (Will Ferrell and My Marianne)	2020	—	—	—	10	—	30	—	30	—	Eurovision Song Contest: The Story of Fire Saga (Music from the Netflix film)
"Song-a-Long: "Believe", "Ray of Light", "Waterloo", "Ne partez pas sans moi", and "I Gotta Feeling"" (as part of Eurovision Song Contest Cast)	2020	—	—	—	—	—	37	—	39	—	Eurovision Song Contest: The Story of Fire Saga (Music from the Netflix film)
"Volcano Man" (Will Ferrell and My Marianne)	2020	—	—	—	—	—	57	—	80	—	Eurovision Song Contest: The Story of Fire Saga (Music from the Netflix film)
"Come Whatever, Come What May" (Jonathan Johansson and My Marianne)	2020	29	—	—	—	—	—	—	—	—	Non-album single
"Dom ska veta"	2021	5	—	—	—	—	—	—	—	—	Dom ska veta
"Lillebror"	2021	65	—	—	—	—	—	—	—	—	Dom ska veta
"Fucking Stockholm"	2021	84	—	—	—	—	—	—	—	—	Dom ska veta
"Noise Cancellation"	2021	89	—	—	—	—	—	—	—	—	Dom ska veta
"E du där?" (featuring Daniela Rathana)	2021	— (Note: "E du där?" did not enter the Swedish Singles Chart, but peaked at number one on the Swedish Heatseeker chart.)	—	—	—	—	—	—	—	—	Dom ska veta
"Dag för dag"	2021	— (Note: "Dag för dag" did not enter the Swedish Singles Chart, but peaked at number five on the Swedish Heatseeker chart.)	—	—	—	—	—	—	—	—	Dom ska veta
"Fotoalbum"	2021	— (Note: "Fotoalbum" did not enter the Swedish Singles Chart, but peaked at number eight on the Swedish Heatseeker chart.)	—	—	—	—	—	—	—	—	Dom ska veta
"10 000 timmar"	2021	— (Note: "10 000 timmar" did not enter the Swedish Singles Chart, but peaked at number 17 on the Swedish Heatseeker chart.)	—	—	—	—	—	—	—	—	Dom ska veta
"Vi tar det imorn"	2025	— (Note: "Vi tar det imorn" did not enter the Swedish Singles Chart, but peaked at number eight on the Swedish Heatseeker chart.)	—	—	—	—	—	—	—	—	Strawberry Blonde
"Det får världen aldrig veta"	2025	30	—	—	—	—	—	—	—	—	Blåögd
"Där runt hörnet"	2025	92	—	—	—	—	—	—	—	—	Blåögd

== Filmography ==
=== Film ===
- 2010: Tangled as Rapunzel (Swedish voice)
- 2020: Eurovision Song Contest: The Story of Fire Saga as Sigrit Ericksdóttir (vocals for singing scenes)

=== Television ===
- 2019: Quicksand as "Singer at funeral"

== Awards and nominations ==
=== Academy Awards ===
Year	Nominee / work	Award	Result	Ref.
2021	"Husavik"	Best Original Song	Nominated	

=== Blog Awards ===
Year	Nominee / work	Award	Result	Ref.
2012	Herself	Blog Rocket of the Year	Won	

=== Critics' Choice Awards ===
Year	Nominee / work	Award	Result	Ref.
2021	"Husavik"	Best Song	Nominated	

=== Grammis ===
Year	Nominee / work	Award	Result	Ref.
2020	Det bästa kanske inte hänt än	Album of the Year	Won	
2020	Det bästa kanske inte hänt än	Pop of the Year	Won	
2020	Herself	Artist of the Year	Won	
2020	Herself	Lyricist of the Year	Nominated	
2020	"Rosa Himmel"	Song of the Year	Nominated	
2022	Dom ska veta	Pop of the Year	Nominated	
2025	"Hålla mig"	Song of the Year	Nominated	
2025	Herself	Pop of the Year	Nominated	

=== Hollywood Critics Association Awards ===
Year	Nominee / work	Award	Result	Ref.
2021	"Husavik"	Best Original Song	Won	

=== Hollywood Music in Media Awards ===
Year	Nominee / work	Award	Result	Ref.
2020	"Husavik"	Best Original Song in a Feature Film	Nominated	

=== P3 Gold Awards ===
Year	Nominee / work	Award	Result	Ref.
2020	Det bästa kanske inte hänt än	Pop of the Year	Won	
2020	Herself	Guldmicken	Won	

=== Rockbjörnen ===
Year	Nominee / work	Award	Result	Ref.
2012	Herself	Female Live Artist of the Year	Nominated	
2020	Herself	Female Live Artist of the Year	Won	

=== Society of Composers and Lyricists Awards ===
Year	Nominee / work	Award	Result	Ref.
2021	"Husavik"	Outstanding Original Song for Visual Media	Won	

Awards and achievements
Preceded by M1 with "Gränslös kärlek"	Sweden in the Junior Eurovision Song Contest; 2006	Succeeded by Frida Sandén with "Nu eller aldrig"
