= Fånga mig när jag faller =

Studio album by Victor Leksell
- Released: 17 June 2020
- Genre: Pop
- Length: 34:25
- Label: Sony Music Sweden; Virrejao
- Producer: William Forsling; Petter Alfredsson; Victor Thell; Jonas Jurström; Marcus Svedin; Niklas Carson Mattsson; Carl Silvergran; Felix Flygare Floderer; Hampus Bergh

Victor Leksell chronology
Fånga mig när jag faller (2020)	Tid & tro (2024)

Singles from Fånga mig när jag faller
- 1. "Vart du sover" Released: 25 May 2018; 2. "Tappat" Released: 12 October 2018; 3. "Allt för mig" Released: 25 January 2019; 4. "Klär av dig" Released: 7 June 2019; 5. "Svag" Released: 17 January 2020; 6. "Fantasi" Released: 13 March 2020

Fånga mig när jag faller (Swedish for Catch Me When I'm Falling) is the debut studio album by Swedish singer Victor Leksell. It was released on 17 June 2020 by Sony Music Sweden and Virrejao.

The album has spawned six singles, including the Sweden top ten singles "Allt för mig", "Tappat", "Klär av dig", "Fantasi", and "Svag", with the last becoming Leksell's first number-one single in Sweden. "Svag" also topped in Norway and reached top 40 in Denmark.

== Promotion ==
=== Singles ===
"Vart du sover" was released as Leksell's debut single and the album's lead single on 25 May 2018 through 2AM Music. The song debuted at number 75 in Sweden and stayed there for three weeks. After the release of the album, "Vart du sover" re-entered the chart and reached its new peak of number 49.

"Tappat" was released as the second single from the album and Leksell's first single through the major music label, Sony Music Sweden. The song instantly earned the singer his first top ten single, debuting at number eight, and peaked at number six on the following week. The song has charted on the Sverigetopplistan chart for 40 non-consecutive weeks and received a double platinum certification from the Swedish Recording Industry Association (GLF).

"Allt för mig" was released on 25 January 2019 as the third single from the album. The song debuted and peaked at number four on the Sverigetopplistan chart before dropping the top 100 after ten weeks. "Allt för mig" re-entered the chart after the release of Fånga mig när jag faller at number 86.

"Klär av dig" was released as the fourth single from the album. The song debuted at number 10 and peaked at number eight in its third week on the Sverigetopplistan chart. The song has charted on the chart for fifty weeks, becoming Leksell's longest-charting song.

"Svag" was released as the fifth single from the album to a commercial success. The song debuted at number one and has held the position for 13 non-consecutive weeks, earning triple platinum certification from GLF. The song also reached number one in Norway and stayed on the spot for 10 consecutive weeks, as well as reaching top 40 in Denmark.

"Fantasi" was released as the sixth single from the album. The song debuted and peaked at number seven in Sweden.

== Commercial performance ==
Fånga mig när jag faller debuted at number one on the Swedish Sverigetopplistan chart, replacing Yasin's 98.01.11, and stayed at the spot for 27 weeks. In Norway, the album debuted at number four on the VG-lista and climbed to number three in the following week. On its first week of release, all the songs from the album charted inside the top 100 in Sweden, as well as Leksell's two other singles "Sverige" and "Bra för dig".

== Track listing ==
Fånga mig när jag faller track listing
No.	Title	Writer(s)	Producer(s)	Length
1.	"Ha dig igen"	Adam Englund; Victor Thell; Jonas Jurström; Marcus Svedin; Victor Laksell; Richard Smitt	Thell; Jurström; Svedin	2:53
2.	"Vart du sover"	Isac Halldin; William Forsling; Petter Alfredsson; Leksell	Alfredsson; Forsling	3:10
3.	"Om igen"	Forsling; Alfredsson; Leksell	Forsling; Alfredsson	3:15
4.	"Tappat"	Forsling; Alfredsson; Leksell	Forsling; Alfredsson	3:35
5.	"Alla dessa gånger"	Forsling; Alfredsson; Leksell	Alfredsson	2:54
6.	"Klär av dig"	Forsling; Alfredsson	Forsling; Alfredsson	3:23
7.	"Bedövning"	Kevin Högdahl; Magnus Jamalde; Niklas Carson Mattsson; Forsling; Alfredsson; Leksell	Mattsson; Alfredsson	3:05
8.	"Allt för mig"	Halldin; Forsling; Alfredsson	Forsling; Alfredsson	2:57
9.	"Svag"	Mattsson; Högdahl; Leksell; Carl Silvergran; Felix Flygare Floderer	Mattsson; Silvergran; Floderer	3:11
10.	"Fantasi"	Felix Bergendahl; Jakob Kullberg; Jonas Knutsson; Hampus Bergh; Leksell; Högdahl; Thell	Bergh; Thell	3:15
11.	"Va min" (featuring Jireel and Newkid)	Jireel; Newkid; Forsling; Alfredsson; Leksell	Forsling; Alfredsson	2:52
Total length:				34:25

== Charts ==
=== Weekly charts ===
Weekly chart performance for Fånga mig när jag faller
Chart (2020)	Peak position
Norwegian Albums (VG-lista)	3
Swedish Albums (Sverigetopplistan)	1

=== Year-end charts ===
Year-end chart performance for Fånga mig när jag faller
Chart	Year	Position
Swedish Albums (Sverigetopplistan)	2020	1
Norwegian Albums (VG-lista)	2021	30
Swedish Albums (Sverigetopplistan)	2021	2
Swedish Albums (Sverigetopplistan)	2022	9
Swedish Albums (Sverigetopplistan)	2023	10
Swedish Albums (Sverigetopplistan)	2024	16
Swedish Albums (Sverigetopplistan)	2025	16
