= Newkid =

Swedish singer and rapper (born 1990)

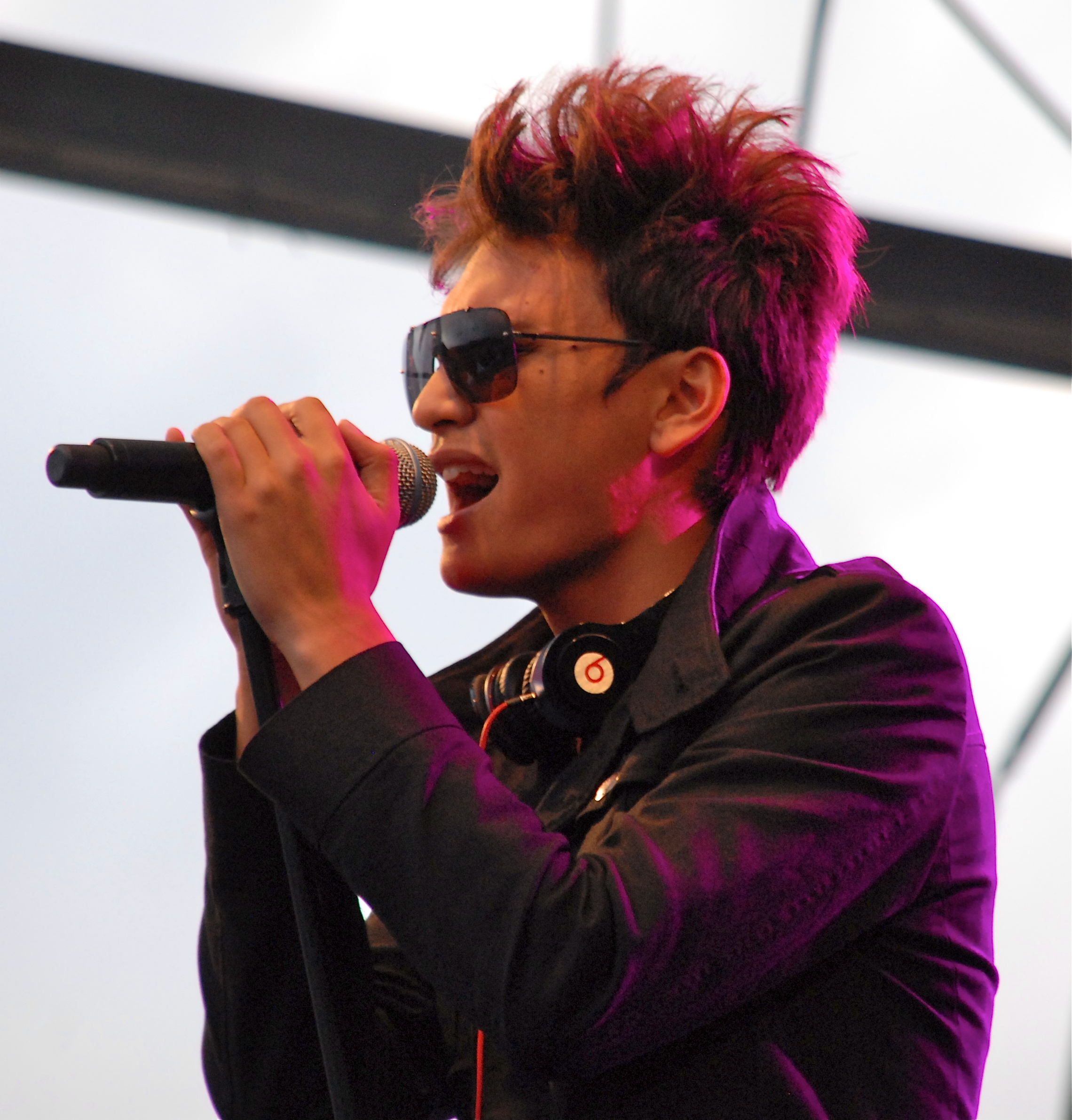
- Newkid in August 2011

Background information
- Also known as: Newkid
- Born: Jhun Alexander Ferrer; 2 December 1990 (age 35); Uddevalla, Sweden
- Origin: Uddevalla, Sweden
- Genres: R&B; hip hop
- Occupations: Singer; rapper
- Instrument: Vocals
- Labels: Baseline, Sony Music Entertainment

Jhun Alexander Ferrer, also known by his stage name Newkid (born 2 December 1990), is a Swedish–Filipino singer and rapper signed to Sony Music Entertainment.

== Career ==
Jhun Alexander Ferrer was born in Uddevalla, Sweden in 1990 to a Swedish mother and a Spanish–Filipino father.

Adopting the stage name Newkid, he released his debut studio album on 15 April 2011, named Alexander JR Ferrer and his debut single in Sweden was "Jag gråter bara i regnet". He is also featured on Lorentz & Sakarias' songs "Lever min dröm" and "Swischa förbi", as well as Ison & Fille's song "Lever såhär". Ferrer released the EP SS18 in the summer of 2018, which peaked at number 21 on the Swedish Albums Chart. He released his second studio album, SS/AW18, later that year. He also featured on Tjuvjakt's single "Apelsinskal", which peaked at number eleven on the Swedish Singles Chart. On 24 April 2020, he released the single "Kanske var vi rätt bra ändå". It peaked at number six on the Swedish Singles Chart. A music video for the song was released on Newkid's YouTube channel on 29 April 2020. Swedish newspaper Aftonbladet stated that Newkid will participate in the upcoming eleventh season of TV4's TV-show Så mycket bättre, which will be recorded in June 2020.

Newkid announced he would his third studio album in 2020. He released the single "Chambea" on 22 May 2020. On 29 May, Newkid released his previously announced third studio album, titled Mount Jhun. It peaked at number three on the Swedish Albums Chart, making it Newkid's first album to make the top 10 on the chart. The album contains the previously released singles "Kanske var vi rätt bra ändå", "Mi Amor", "Chambea" and "Över dig".

== Discography ==
=== Albums ===
Title	Details	Peak chart positions
Title	Details	SWE
Alexander JR Ferrer	Released: 15 April 2011; Label: Family Tree Music; Formats: Digital download, streaming	—
SS/AW18	Released: 28 December 2018; Label: Sony Music; Formats: Digital download, streaming	— (Note: While the album did not chart, the EP SS18 peaked at number 21 on the Swedish album chart.)
Mount Jhun	Released: 29 May 2020; Label: Sony Music; Formats: Digital download, streaming	3
Vi	Released: 21 January 2022; Label: Sony Music; Formats: Digital download, streaming	1

=== Singles ===
(The singles are mostly adapted from Spotify.)

Title	Year	Peak chart positions	Album
Title	Year	SWE	Album
"Gör det för"	2010	—	Non-album single
"Jag gråter bara i regnet"	2011	51	Alexander JR Ferrer
"Kate Moss"	2017	— (Note: "Kate Moss" did not enter the Swedish Singles Chart, but peaked at number 18 on the Swedish Heatseeker chart.)	Non-album singles
"Drama"	2017	—	Non-album singles
"Ny lur"	2018	—	Non-album singles
"Lakan"	2018	55	SS/AW18
"Går under med dig"	2018	—	SS/AW18
"Tyst för länge"	2018	—	SS/AW18
"Mona Lisa"	2018	—	SS/AW18
"Mi amor"	2019	75	Non-album singles
"Över dig"	2020	96	Non-album singles
"Svag" (Note: Cover of Victor Leksell's single.)	2020	— (Note: "Svag" did not enter the Swedish Singellista Chart, but peaked at number one on the Swedish Heatseeker Chart.)	Karantän vibbar
"F.A.M.E (LeyLey)" (Note: Cover of Dani M's and Simon Superti's single.)	2020	— (Note: "F.A.M.E" did not enter the Swedish Singellista Chart, but peaked at number six on the Swedish Heatseeker Chart.)	Karantän vibbar
"En säng av rosor" (Note: Cover of Darin's single.)	2020	— (Note: "En säng av rosor" did not enter the Swedish Singellista Chart, but peaked at number 10 on the Swedish Heatseeker Chart.)	Karantän vibbar
"Kanske var vi rätt bra ändå"	2020	6	Mount Jhun
"Chambea"	2020	43	Mount Jhun
"Du måste finnas"	2020	1	Så mycket bättre 2020 – Tolkningarna
"Starkare"	2020	2	Så mycket bättre 2020 – Tolkningarna
"Mitt hjärta bara sviker mig"	2020	19	Så mycket bättre 2020 – Tolkningarna
"Vill vi samma sak"	2020	26	Så mycket bättre 2020 – Tolkningarna
"Aldrig haft något annat val"	2021	8	Vi
"Chansa" (with Dani M and Jireel featuring Simon Superti)	2021	39	Push3r
"Ingen luft mellan oss"	2021	17	Vi
"Vänner" (with Myra Granberg)	2022	16	Vi
"Aska"	2022	48	Vi
"Stå med mig i regnet" (Spotify Studio It's Hits recording)	2022	32	Non-album singles
"Julibarn" (with Naod)	2023	37	Non-album singles
"Underbart"	2024	86	Non-album singles
"Nära"	2024	— (Note: "Nära" did not enter the Swedish Singellista Chart, but peaked at number 18 on the Swedish Heatseeker Chart.)	Non-album singles
"Istället" (with Reyn and Dani M)	2025	— (Note: "Istället" did not enter the Swedish Singellista Chart, but peaked at number 1 on the Swedish Heatseeker Chart.)	Non-album singles
"Hos dig är jag stark" (with Tjuvjakt and Clayton)	2025	34	Non-album singles
"Hurricane"	2026	41	Non-album singles
"Tillbaka till dig"	2026	— (Note: "Tillbaka til dig" did not enter the Swedish Singellista Chart, but peaked at number 4 on the Swedish Heatseeker Chart.)	Non-album singles
"Vänner tittar inte så på varandra"	2026	— (Note: "Vänner tittar inte så på varandra" did not enter the Swedish Singellista Chart, but peaked at number 20 on the Swedish Heatseeker Chart.)	Non-album singles
"Kom över"	2026	45	Non-album singles

=== Featured singles ===
Title	Year	Peak chart positions	Album
Title	Year	SWE	Album
"Lever såhär" (Ison & Fille featuring Newkid)	2010	—	För evigt
"Mighty" (Petter featuring Newkid)	2013	—	Början på allt
"Utan dig" (Molly Sandén featuring Newkid)	2017	16	Större
"Apelsinskal" (Tjuvjakt featuring Newkid)	2020	11	Tomma fickor
"Jag mår bra nu" (Molly Sandén featuring Newkid)	2020	4	Dom ska veta
"Tusen gånger om" (Estraden featuring Newkid)	2022	13	TBA

=== Other charted songs ===
Title	Year	Peak chart positions	Album
Title	Year	SWE	Album
"Dör för min" (featuring Jireel)	2020	77	Mount Jhun
"Våga"	2022	9	Vi
"Laga det som rasat"	2022	— (Note: "Laga det som rasat" did not enter the Swedish Singellista Chart, but peaked at number 17 on the Swedish Heatseeker Chart.)	Vi
"Fångat en ängel"	2022	— (Note: "Fångat en ängel" did not enter the Swedish Singellista Chart, but peaked at number 14 on the Swedish Heatseeker Chart.)	Vi
