= Bra för dig =

2019 single by Estraden and Victor Leksell

Single by Estraden and Victor Leksell

from the album Mellan hägg och syrén
- Language: Swedish
- English title: "Good for You"
- Released: 30 August 2019
- Length: 3:46
- Label: Sony

Estraden singles chronology
"Smartare" (2019)	"Bra för dig" (2019)	"Det svåraste" (2020)

Victor Leksell singles chronology
"Klär av dig" (2011)	"Bra för dig" (2019)	"Svag" (2020)

"Bra för dig" is a song by Swedish pop group Estraden and Swedish singer Victor Leksell, released in August 2019.

== Charts ==
=== Weekly charts ===
Chart (2019/20)	Peak position
Sweden (Sverigetopplistan)	2

=== Year-end charts ===
Chart (2019)	Position
Sweden (Sverigetopplistan)	41
Chart (2020)	Position
Sweden (Sverigetopplistan)	26

== Certifications ==
Region	Certification	Certified units/sales
Sweden (GLF)	3× Platinum	24,000,000^{†}
^{†} Streaming-only figures based on certification alone.
