= Victor Leksell =

Swedish singer from Torslanda (born 1997)

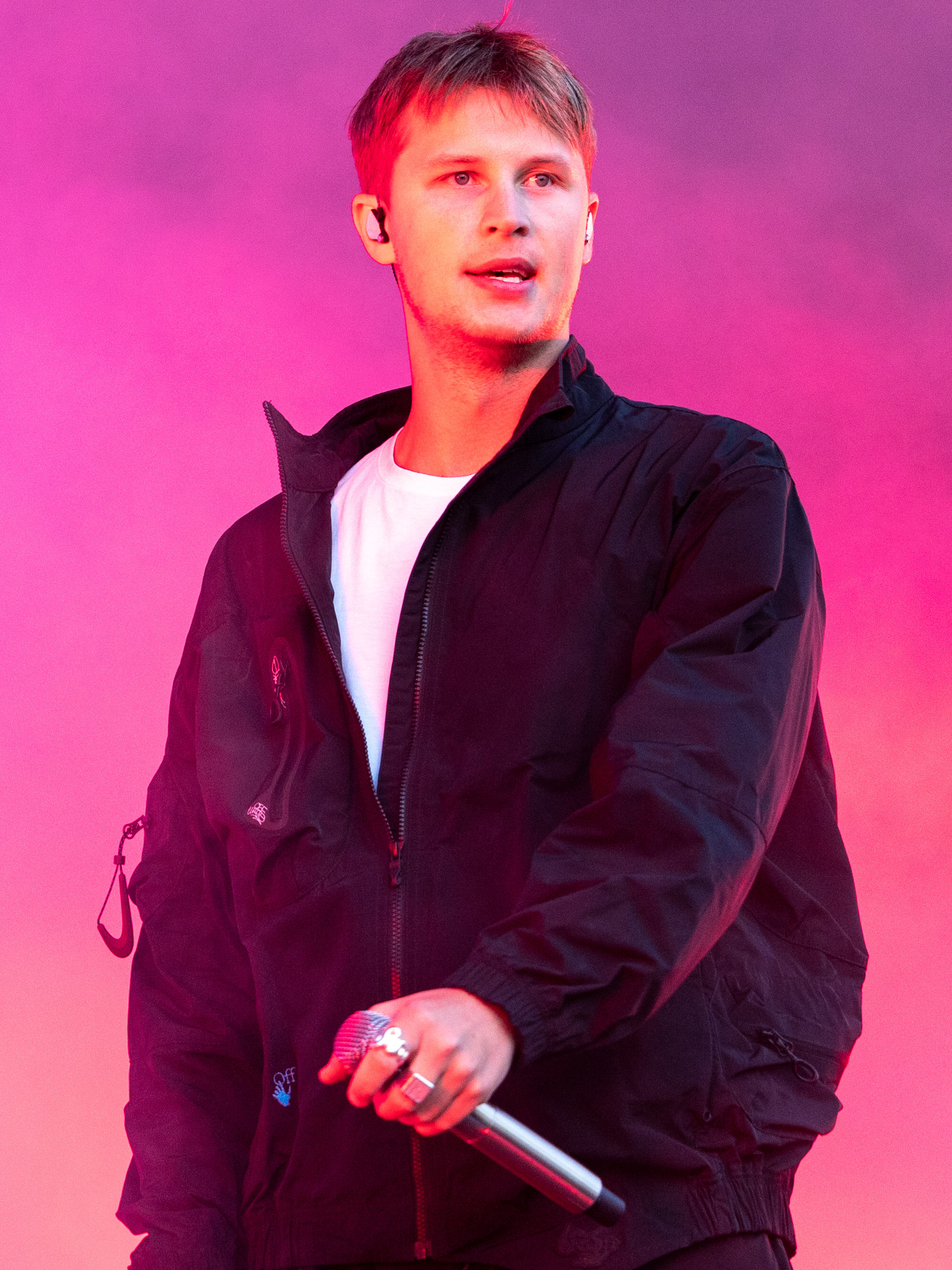
- Leksell in 2024

Background information
- Born: 4 April 1997 (age 29); Torslanda, Sweden
- Genre: Pop
- Occupation: Singer
- Instrument: Vocals
- Years active: 2017–present
- Label: Sony Music
- Member of: Björnzone
- Website: victorleksell.com

Victor Leksell (born 4 April 1997) is a Swedish singer from Torslanda. Since his first releases in 2018, his most successful single was released in 2020, called "Svag". The song peaked at number one on the Swedish Singles Chart and it was also certified nonuple platinum in the country. On 17 June 2020, Leksell released his debut studio album, Fånga mig när jag faller. It peaked at number 1 in Sweden and made it to number 3 in Norway.

== Early life ==
He was born on 4 April 1997 in Torslanda, Sweden.

== Career ==
Leksell participated in Idol 2017 where he made it to the Top 21 and qualifying week before being voted off. In 2018, he released the song "Tappat" which received over 5 million streams on Spotify. As of February 2020, the song has amassed over 25 million streams. His fifth single "Svag" peaked at number one on the Swedish singles chart, thus becoming Leksell's first single to reach that position. He released the song a few weeks after performing it at Musikhjälpen in 2019. The song held the number one spot for seven consecutive weeks, from week four to week eleven, being replaced by the Weeknd's "Blinding Lights" in the latter week. However, "Svag" returned to number one on the chart in week 12 and stayed there for one week. On 3 May 2020, the song also placed at number one on Sveriges Radio's chart Svensktoppen.

The song was subsequently certified nonuple platinum in Sweden. It also peaked at number one on the Norwegian chart. He released his sixth single in March 2020, "Fantasi", which peaked at number seven on the Swedish singles chart.

On 10 April 2020, Leksell, Molly Sandén and Joakim Berg released a cover of Kent's song "Sverige", with all of its revenue going to Radiohjälpen's fundraising for the COVID-19 risk groups in Sweden. The song peaked at number 11 on the Swedish singles chart.

Leksell subsequently performed at the SVT live-show En kväll tillsammans on 11 April 2020, in support of the fundraising. In May 2020, Leksell performed the song "Svag" together with Norwegian singer Astrid S at the border between Norway and Sweden.

On 17 June 2020, Leksell released his debut studio album, titled Fånga mig när jag faller. The album contains the previously released singles "Vart du sover", "Tappat", "Allt för mig", "Klär av dig", "Svag" and "Fantasi". The album debuted at number one on the Swedish albums chart.

In 2023, he collaborated with Basshunter on "Ingen kan slå (Boten Anna)". It charted at number four on the Swedish singles chart. On 19 January 2024, Leksell released his second studio album, Tid & tro. This album also topped the charts in Sweden.

In 2025, Leksell started releasing singles ahead of his third studio album, including "Skriker mitt namn" in January and "Hur många mil" in April.

== Awards and nominations ==
In the summer of 2019, Leksell was nominated in three categories at the Swedish magazine Aftonbladet's competition "Rockbjörnen". Subsequently, he won his first "Rockbjörn" on 13 August 2019 in the category "Årets genombrott". Leksell was also nominated for "Årets nykomling" at the Swedish "Grammisgalan" in 2020.

== Personal life ==
As of April 2024, Leksell lives in Stockholm with his girlfriend, Lisa Magnusson; they also own an apartment in Gothenburg. The two met at a mutual friend's graduation party.

== Discography ==
=== Studio albums ===
Title	Details	Peak chart positions		Certification
Title	Details	SWE	NOR	Certification
Fånga mig när jag faller	Released: 17 June 2020; Label: Sony Music; Formats: Digital download, streaming, LP	1	3	IFPI Danmark: Gold; IFPI Norge: Platinum
Tid & tro	Released: 19 January 2024; Label: Sony Music; Formats: Digital download, streaming, LP	1	—	IFPI Sverige: Platinum

=== Singles ===
Title	Year	Peak chart positions			Certification	Album
Title	Year	SWE	DEN	NOR	Certification	Album
"Vart du sover"	2018	49	—	—	IFPI Sverige: Platinum	Fånga mig när jag faller
"Tappat"	2018	6	—	—	IFPI Sverige: 3× Platinum	Fånga mig när jag faller
"Allt för mig"	2019	4	—	—	IFPI Sverige: Platinum	Fånga mig när jag faller
"Klär av dig"	2019	8	—	—	IFPI Sverige: Platinum	Fånga mig när jag faller
"Bra för dig" (with Estraden)	2019	2	—	—	IFPI Sverige: 3× Platinum	Mellan hägg och syrén
"Svag"	2020	1	18	1	IFPI Sverige: 9× Platinum; IFPI Danmark: Platinum; IFPI Norge: 9× Platinum	Fånga mig när jag faller
"Fantasi"	2020	7	—	—	IFPI Sverige: Platinum	Fånga mig när jag faller
"Gav allt" (with Jireel and Reyn)	2020	4	—	—	IFPI Sverige: Platinum	Sex känslor
"Sverige" (with Molly Sandén and Joakim Berg)	2020	11	—	—	IFPI Sverige: Platinum	Non-album single
"Tystnar i luren" (with Miriam Bryant)	2021	1	—	—	IFPI Sverige: 5× Platinum	PS jag hatar dig
"Snälla bli min"	2021	2	—	—		Satan i gatan 10 år
"Eld & lågor"	2021	4	—	—	IFPI Sverige: 3× Platinum	Vinterviken
"Hela världen är min"	2022	6	—	—	IFPI Sverige: 2× Platinum	Tid & tro
"Leilo brenner" (Spotify Studio It's Hits recording; with Ramón)	2022	51	—	17		Non-album single
"Din låt" (with Einár)	2022	1	—	—	IFPI Sverige: 5× Platinum; IFPI Norge: Gold	Tid & tro
"Rymden och tillbaks" (with Norlie & KKV)	2022	9	—	—		Så mycket bättre 2022 – Tolkningarna
"Nätterna i Göteborg"	2023	1	—	—		Tid & tro
"Fånga mig när jag faller"	2023	3	—	—		Tid & tro
"Ingen kan slå (Boten Anna)" (with Basshunter)	2023	4	—	—		Non-album single
"Natten blir till dag"	2023	4	—	—		Tid & tro
"Ramla"	2023	8	—	—		Tid & tro
"Låt mig va" (with Bolaget)	2023	1	—	—		Non-album single
"Tid & tro"	2024	5	—	—		Tid & tro
"En del av dig" (from the Netflix film)	2024	— (Note: "En del av dig" did not enter the Swedish Singellista Chart, but peaked at number one on the Swedish Heatseeker Chart.)	—	—		Non-album single
"Lost and Found" (with Molly Sandén)	2024	1	—	—	IFPI Sverige: Platinum	Blåögd
"Skriker mitt namn"	2025	2	—	—		TBA
"Hur många mil"	2025	5	—	—		TBA
"Lys på mig"	2025	8	— (Note: "Lys på mig" peaked at number 18 on the Danish airplay chart.)	—		TBA
"Ta mig aldrig härifrån" (with De Vet Du)	2025	4	—	—		TBA
"Väntat"	2026	8	—	—		TBA
"Fiji"	2026	15	—	—		TBA
"Atom" (with Lovet)	2026	2	—	—		TBA
"Tänk om" (with Molly Sandén)	2026	1	—	—		TBA
"Azalea"	2026	3	—	—		TBA
"—" denotes a release that did not chart or was not released in that territory.

=== Featured singles ===
Title	Year	Peak chart positions		Certification	Album
Title	Year	SWE	DEN	Certification	Album
"Flightmode" (Rymdpojken featuring Victor Leksell)	2020	36	—		Non-album single
"Stor man" (Tobias Rahim featuring Victor Leksell)	2023	15	19	GLF: Gold	Non-album single

=== Other charting songs ===
Title	Year	Peak positions	Album
Title	Year	SWE	Album
"Bedövning"	2020	3	Fånga mig när jag faller
"Ha dig igen"	2020	5	Fånga mig när jag faller
"Om igen"	2020	10	Fånga mig när jag faller
"Va min" (featuring Jireel and Newkid)	2020	15	Fånga mig när jag faller
"Alla dessa gånger"	2020	32	Fånga mig när jag faller
"Zenith" (with Vittorio Grasso)	2024	— (Note: "Zenith" did not enter the Swedish Singellista Chart, but peaked at number seven on the Swedish Heatseeker Chart.)	Vinterviken and Tid & tro
"Fotografi"	2024	36	Tid & tro
"Om jag somnar"	2024	47	Tid & tro
"Natthimlen"	2024	74	Tid & tro
"Dårar"	2024	90	Tid & tro
"Bättre än mig"	2024	— (Note: "Bättre än mig" did not enter the Swedish Singellista Chart, but peaked at number eight on the Swedish Heatseeker Chart.)	Tid & tro
"031."	2024	— (Note: "031." did not enter the Swedish Singellista Chart, but peaked at number five on the Swedish Heatseeker Chart.)	Tid & tro
