= Norlie & KKV =

Swedish hip hop rapping and singing duo

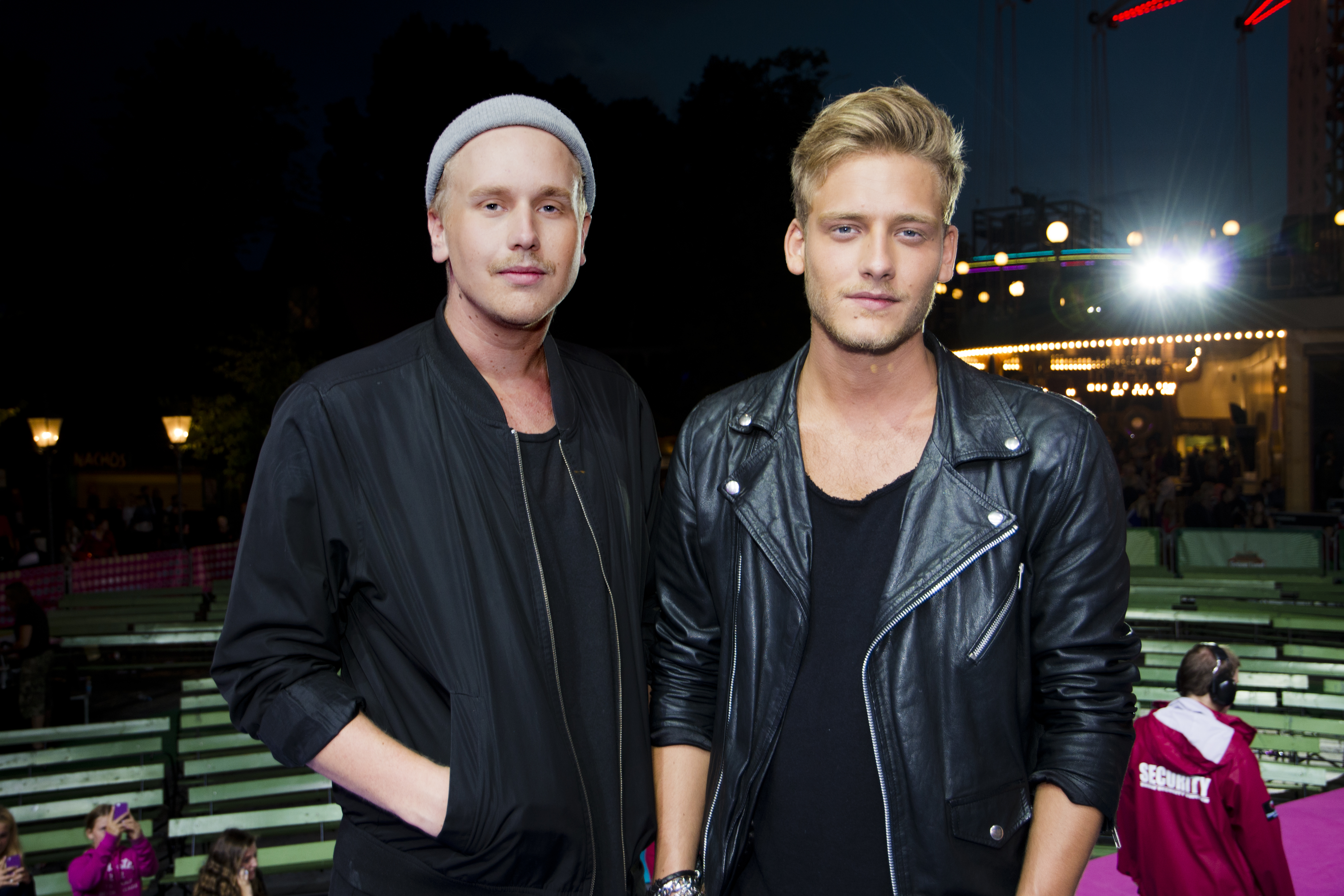

Background information
- Origin: Stockholm, Sweden
- Genre: Hip hop
- Years active: 2008-present
- Label: Universal Music
- Members: Sonny Fahlberg (Norlie); Kim Vadenhag (KKV)

Norlie & KKV is a Swedish hip hop rapping and singing duo made up of Sonny Fahlberg (known as Norlie) and Kim Vadenhag (known as KKV). They are signed to Universal Music Sweden.

== Career ==
The duo met in the Stockholm suburb of Huddinge in 2008 and formed a duo to release modern rap materials, influenced by pop, rock, house, electro music and techno. They were helped by David Günther, a well-known Stockholm DJ. They released "Can I Be the One", produced by Daniel Gidlund and featuring vocals from Lazee, with the music video filmed in Los Angeles. They also performed at NRJ Summer Club in 2010, in Helsinki's Nickelodeon Dagen 2011 (with Lazee) and in Ungdomens hus i Upplands-Bro (again with Lazee).

In Spring 2011, they were picked as "Artist of the Month" by MTV and Comviq, made a successful appearance at Vakna! med The Voice (meaning Wake up! with The Voice) and were on NRJ radio's landed first on NRJ's "Dagens Topp 3" (meaning "Today's Top 3") with the single "Pressad av tid", landing them a deal with Universal Music.

The duo's debut single for the label was "När jag går ner", which reached number 18 on the Swedish Singles Chart. Their most successful single to date, considering chart positions, is "Mer för varandra", which features Estraden. The single peaked at number one on the Swedish Singles Chart.

== Discography ==
=== Albums ===
Year	Album	Peak	Certification	Notes
Year	Album	SWE	Certification	Notes
2013	Snart	17		Tracklist: 1. "Snart" (4:09); 2. "Pansar" (4:45); 3. "När jag går ner" (3:26); 4. "Faller" (3:37); 5. "Aldrig" (2:26); 6. "Hon vill vara du" (3:31); 7. "Tröjan du hatar" (3:29); 8. "Soldat" (3:41); 9. "Där jag hänger min hatt" (3:35); 10. "Nej" (3:14); 11. "Imorgon kommer aldrig bli som igår" (4:07)
2016	Alla våra låtar	5	GLF: 2× Platinum	
2019	Se på oss	14		

=== EPs ===
- En liten del av någonting (2011)
- Där jag hänger min hatt (2012)
- Sad Romance Pt. 1 (2024) – No. 25 Sweden

=== Singles ===
Title	Year	Peak	Certification	Album
Title	Year	SWE	Certification	Album
"Samma barn"	2011	—		Non-album single
"Pressad av tid"	2011	—		En liten del av någonting
"När jag går ner"	2011	18	GLF: 2× Platinum	Snart
"Tröjan du hatar"	2012	2	GLF: 3× Platinum	Snart
"Där jag hänger min hatt"	2012	5	GLF: 2× Platinum	Snart
"Hon vill vara du"	2012	—		Snart
"Nej"	2013	42		Snart
"Faller"	2013	33		Snart
"Ingen annan rör mig som du"	2015	2	GLF: 5× Platinum	Alla våra låtar
"Du får göra vad du vill med mig"	2015	25		Alla våra låtar
"Västerbron"	2015	53		Alla våra låtar
"Din idiot"	2016	7	GLF: Platinum	Alla våra låtar
"Det vet väl du"	2016	57		Alla våra låtar
"Alla våra låtar"	2016	67		Alla våra låtar
"Säg nåt som får mig att stanna"	2017	27		
"Mer för varandra" (with Estraden)	2018	1		
"Om du lämnar mig nu"	2018	15		
"Seven Eleven"	2019	31		Se på oss
"Bilen"	2019	41		Se på oss
"Se på oss"	2019	44		Se på oss
"Saker som gör ont"	2020	29		Non-album singles
"September"	2020	27		Non-album singles
"Tillfälligheter"	2020	96		Non-album singles
"Komma över dig" (Spotify Studio It's Hits) (with Junie)	2020	7		Non-album singles
"Glad för din skull"	2020	28		Non-album singles
"Ensam"	2021	12		Non-album singles
"Ringar på vattnet"	2021	61		Non-album singles
"Jag lovar"	2022	57		Non-album singles
"Tänker på dig"	2022	— (Note: "Tänker på dig" did not enter the Swedish Singellista Chart, but peaked at number four on the Swedish Heatseeker Chart.)		Non-album singles
"Jag vill inte bråka"	2022	— (Note: "Jag vill inte bråka" did not enter the Swedish Singellista Chart, but peaked at number 17 on the Swedish Heatseeker Chart.)		Non-album singles
"Som ett minne blott" (featuring Benjamin Ingrosso)	2022	13		Non-album singles
"En sån som han"	2022	17		Non-album singles
"Cara Mia"	2022	18		Non-album singles
"Rymden och tillbanks" (with Victor Leksell)	2022	9		Non-album singles
"Sensommarvind"	2022	54		Non-album singles
"2015"	2023	47		Non-album singles
"Hjärtat utanpå min skjorta"	2023	35		Non-album singles
"Långa vägen hem"	2024	44		Non-album singles
"Näktergal"	2024	66		Non-album singles
"Enchanté" (with Svea)	2024	62		Non-album singles
"Hur ska jag sova inatt"	2024	44		Non-album singles
"Tiden läker alla sår"	2024	— (Note: "Tiden läker alla sår" did not enter the Swedish Singellista Chart, but peaked at number eight on the Swedish Heatseeker Chart.)		Non-album singles
"Trubbel & kaos"	2025	94		Non-album singles
"Heartbreak & 808s" (featuring Bruno)	2026	— (Note: "Heartbreak & 808s" did not enter the Swedish Singellista Chart, but peaked at number 10 on the Swedish Heatseeker Chart.)		Non-album singles

== Videography ==
Year	Title	Role	Notes
2011	"Standard"	Themselves	Music video
2011	"Can I Be the One" (featuring Lazee)	Themselves	Music video
