= Svag =

2020 single by Victor Leksell

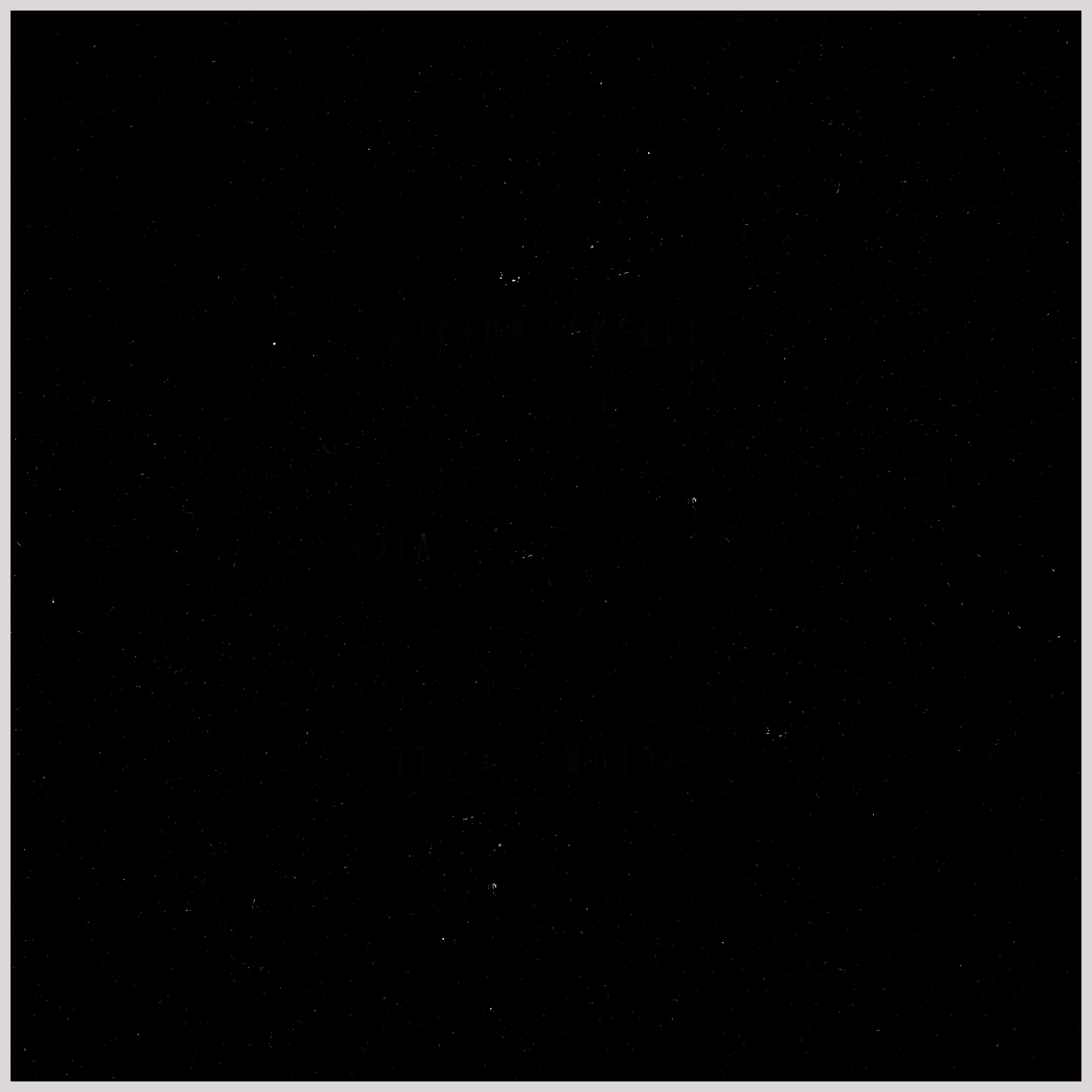

Single by Victor Leksell

from the album Fånga mig när jag faller
- Language: Swedish
- English title: "Weak"
- Released: 17 January 2020
- Length: 3:11
- Label: Sony
- Songwriters: Carl Silvergran; Felix Flygare Floderer; Kevin Högdahl; Niklas Carson Mattsson; Victor Leksell
- Producers: Carl Silvergran; Felix Flygare Floderer; Niklas Carson Mattsson

Victor Leksell singles chronology
"Bra för dig" (2019)	"Svag" (2020)	"Fantasi" (2020)

"Svag" is a song by Swedish singer Victor Leksell, released as a single from his debut album, Fånga mig när jag faller (2020). Leksell performed the song at Musikhjälpen in December 2019; following positive reception from fans, the song was released on 17 January 2020. "Svag" was written by Leksell along with Carl Silvergran, Felix Flygare Floderer, Kevin Högdahl, and Niklas Carson Mattsson, and produced by Silvergran, Floderer, and Mattsson. According to Leksell, the song expresses the feeling of having one's breath taken away while in the presence of a love interest.

In Sweden, "Svag" debuted at number-one on the singles chart and stayed atop for 14 non-consecutive weeks; it has subsequently been certified nonuple platinum by the Swedish Recording Industry Association. The song also topped the singles chart in Norway and has reached the top 20 in Denmark, where it has been certified platinum. Leksell and Norwegian singer Astrid S performed "Svag" on the Svinesund Bridge on the Norway–Sweden border; the duet was performed in the singers' respective languages of Swedish and Norwegian. Due to the song's success in the Nordic countries, Leksell was awarded the 2020 Nordens språkpris (transl. Nordic Language Award) by Föreningen Norden for breaking down linguistic barriers. In October 2020, "Svag" became the most-streamed Swedish-language song on Spotify, accruing over 100 million streams. As of March 2021, it has been streamed over 130 million times.

In 2020, "Svag" was awarded the Rockbjörnen for Swedish Song of the Year (Årets svenska låt), and was nominated for International Hit of the Year (Årets internationale hit) at the Danish Music Awards. It was also awarded the 2020 Svensktoppen award for Song of the Year (Årets låt). At the P3 Gold Awards in 2021, the song won in the category of Song of the Year (Årets låt). Additionally, "Svag" won Song of the Year (Årets låt) at the 2021 Grammis.

Victor Leksell was in talks with Basshunter about working together, and Basshunter was supposed to remix "Svag", but instead of it they recorded "Ingen kan slå (Boten Anna)".

== Charts ==
=== Weekly charts ===
Chart (2020)	Peak position
Denmark (Tracklisten)	18
Norway (VG-lista)	1
Sweden (Sverigetopplistan)	1

=== Year-end charts ===
Chart	Year	Position
Denmark (Tracklisten)	2020	41
Norway (VG-lista)	2020	1
Sweden (Sverigetopplistan)	2020	1
Norway (VG-lista)	2021	24
Sweden (Sverigetopplistan)	2021	6
Sweden (Sverigetopplistan)	2022	49
Sweden (Sverigetopplistan)	2023	73
Sweden (Sverigetopplistan)	2024	92
Sweden (Sverigetopplistan)	2025	76

== Certifications ==
Region	Certification	Certified units/sales
Denmark (IFPI Danmark)	2× Platinum	180,000^{‡}
Norway (IFPI Norway)	9× Platinum	540,000^{‡}
Sweden (GLF)	9× Platinum	72,000,000^{†}
^{‡} Sales+streaming figures based on certification alone.^{†} Streaming-only figures based on certification alone.

== See also ==
- List of number-one singles of 2020 (Norway)
- List of number-one singles of 2020 (Sweden)
