= Myra Granberg =

Swedish singer-songwriter and producer (born 1994)

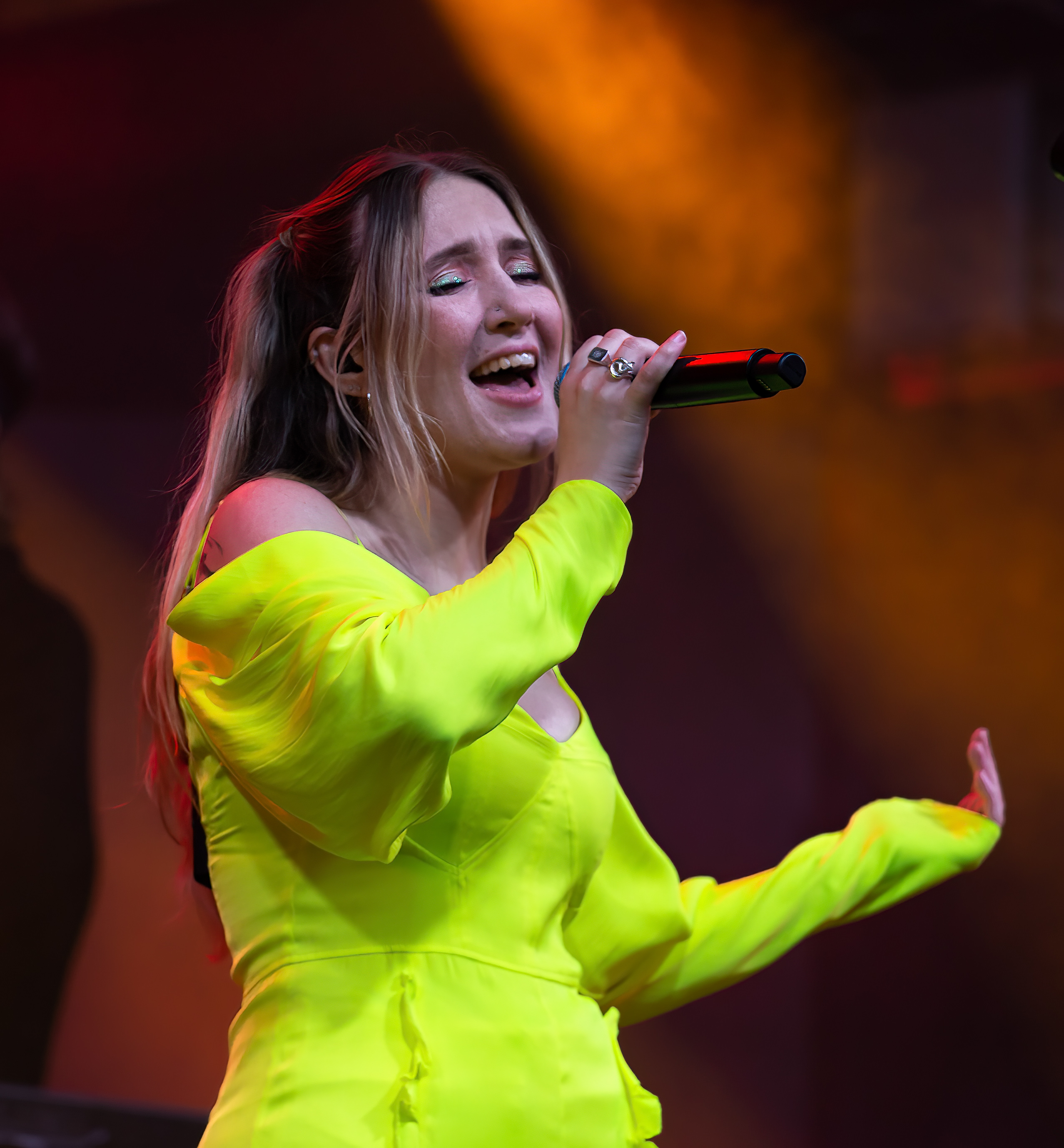
- Granberg in 2021

Background information
- Also known as: Lvly
- Born: August 7, 1994 (age 32)
- Origin: Nybro, Sweden
- Occupations: Singer-songwriter; producer
- Instrument: Vocals
- Years active: 1990-present
- Labels: Nick; Sony

Myra Eila Matilda Kenttä Granberg (born August 7, 1994) is a Swedish singer-songwriter and producer. Her debut single "Tills mitt hjärta går under" peaked at number six on the Swedish singles chart and has been streamed 11 million times. In 2019, she signed with Sony Music. On 14 February 2020, Granberg released the single "Äru min nu" and it peaked at number four on the Swedish Heatseekers Chart. On 15 May 2020, she released the single "Salt i såren", featuring Malin Christin. She is also known as Lvly, a name that she uses on Epidemic Sound for pop and electronic music in English.

On 16 April 2021, Granberg released "Lose My Mind", the first track from her upcoming debut studio album; the album released on 10 September 2021.

== Discography ==
=== Studio albums ===
List of albums
Title	Details	Peak chart positions
Title	Details	SWE
Andra sidan är ni klara	Released: 10 September 2021; Label: Sony Music Sweden; Formats: Digital download, streaming	6

=== EPs ===
List of EPs
Title	Details
Bara hälften kvar	Released: 16 October 2020; Label: Sony Music Sweden; Formats: digital download, streaming

=== Singles ===
==== As solo artist ====
Title	Year	Peak chart positions	Certification	Album
Title	Year	SWE	Certification	Album
"Tills mitt hjärta går under"	2019	6	GLF: 3× Platinum	Bara hälften kvar
"Äru min nu"	2020	— (Note: While "Äru min nu" didn't enter the Swedish Singellista Chart, it peaked at number four on the Swedish Heatseekers Chart.)		Bara hälften kvar
"Salt i såren" (with Malin Christin)	2020	—		Non-album single
"Då kan dom inte ta oss"	2020	—		Bara hälften kvar
"HKF (Håll käften & försvinn)"	2020	15		Bara hälften kvar
"Finn fem fel"	2020	—		Bara hälften kvar
"Systra mi" (with Hon)	2021	— (Note: "Systra mi" did not enter the Swedish Singles Chart, but peaked at number 11 on the Swedish Heatseeker chart.)		När allt rinner över
"Lose My Mind"	2021	3		Andra sidan är ni klara
"Jag kommer"	2021	30		Satan i gatan 10 år
"Sad Boy"	2021	— (Note: "Sad Boy" did not enter the Swedish Singles Chart, but peaked at number ten on the Swedish Heatseeker chart.)		Andra sidan är ni klara
"När hjärtat bankar" (Theme from Eva & Adam)	2021	— (Note: "När hjärtat bankar" did not enter the Swedish Singles Chart, but peaked at number two on the Swedish Heatseeker chart.)		Eva & Adam
"Liten&Lost"	2021	68		Andra sidan är ni klara
"First Aid Kit"	2021	39		Andra sidan är ni klara
"Vidare" (with Imenella)	2021	— (Note: "Vidare" did not enter the Swedish Singellista Chart, but peaked at number 13 on the Swedish Heatseeker Chart.)		Non-album singles
"Vänner" (with Newkid)	2022	16		Non-album singles
"Highlights"	2022	— (Note: "Highlights" did not enter the Swedish Singellista Chart, but peaked at number one on the Swedish Heatseeker Chart.)		Non-album singles
"Du förtjänar det"	2022	62		Non-album singles
"Psykopat"	2023	— (Note: "Psykopat" did not enter the Swedish Singellista Chart, but peaked at number three on the Swedish Heatseeker Chart.)		Non-album singles
"Nej tack, det är bra!"	2023	61		Non-album singles
"Tills jag somnar"	2023	— (Note: "Tills jag somnar" did not enter the Swedish Singellista Chart, but peaked at number five on the Swedish Heatseeker Chart.)		Non-album singles
"Dansa min docka"	2024	— (Note: "Dansa min docka" did not enter the Swedish Singellista Chart, but peaked at number 15 on the Swedish Heatseeker Chart.)		Non-album singles

As Lvly

Title	Year	Album
Head Under Water	2018	Messed It Up
Messed It Up	2018	Messed It Up
Dance With You	2018	Messed It Up
Catching Fire	2018	Messed It Up
Reputation	2018	Messed It Up
Only Seventeen	2018	Messed It Up
Not Ready For Darkness	2018	Messed It Up
Brand New (Helium)	2018	Brand New (Helium)
Next To Me	2018	Brand New (Helium)
Way Way Back	2018	Way Way Back
Feel So Good	2018	Way Way Back
Paper Chasing	2018	Way Way Back
Sucker For Hearts	2018	Way Way Back
Bottom Of My Bottle	2018	Way Way Back
Red Lights	2018	Way Way Back
Mad Woman	2018	Mad Woman
Looking For A Lover	2018	Mad Woman
My Bare Bones	2018	Mad Woman
On The Clock	2018	Mad Woman
Wild	2018	Mad Woman
No Money On My Mind	2018	No Money On My Mind
Busy Loving Myself	2018	No Money On My Mind
No Money On My Mind (Chez Remix)	2018	No Money On My Mind
Believer (with Tape Machines)	2018	The Winner
Coming To Get You	2019	Just Lvly
Celebration	2019	Just Lvly
Wash It Over Me	2019	Just Lvly
Sleep Deprived	2019	Just Lvly
Rose Coloured Glasses	2019	Just Lvly
Hey You	2019	Just Lvly
In Your Head	2019	Just Lvly
Million	2019	Just Lvly
No Remedy	2019	Just Lvly
Fool For You	2019	Just Lvly
Messed It Up (Chez Remix)	2019	Just Lvly
Around You	2019	Around You
Flicker Thicker Flames	2019	Around You
Things I Love	2019	Things I Love
Table Talk	2019	Things I Love
Worst Behavior	2019	Things I Love
Forest Fire	2019	Things I Love
I Told You So	2019	Things I Love
High Life	2019	Things I Love
Not About Us	2019	Things I Love
Dive	2019	Things I Love
White Shirt Collar	2019	Things I Love
One Drink	2019	Things I Love
Rhythm	2019	Things I Love
Lifeline	2019	Things I Love
Honeycomb	2019	Things I Love
Don't Make Sense	2019	Things I Love
We Got This	2019	Things I Love
Night After Night	2019	Night After Night
With You Always	2019	Night After Night
Hold Tight	2019	Night After Night
Dance	2019	Night After Night
Deep Into The Wild	2019	Night After Night
Done	2019	Done
Out On The Roof	2019	Done
Love Me Like Yesterday	2019	Love Me Like Yesterday
Bitter End (Aftermath)	2019	Love Me Like Yesterday
Liar Liar Liar	2019	Love Me Like Yesterday
Won't Do That Again	2019	Love Me Like Yesterday
Mom's Old Hatchback (In Too Deep)	2019	Mom's Old Hatchback (In Too Deep)
Sorry (Come Back)	2019	Mom's Old Hatchback (In Too Deep)
Mad Love	2019	Mad Love
Everlasting Ego	2019	Mad Love
Demons (In My Mind)	2019	Mad Love
Next To Me (Acoustic Version)	2020	Non-album single
Over	2020	Non-album single
End Destination	2020	End Destination
Love You On The Inside	2020	End Destination
Way Way Back (Acoustic Version)	2020	Non-album single
The Sun Goes Down (with STRLGHT)	2020	Non-album single
Toxic Love	2020	Non-album single
Love of Mine	2020	Non-album single
Can't Forgive Myself	2020	Non-album single
Feel Good (Summit) (with Smartface, Pandaraps)	2021	Non-album single
Again and Again and Again	2022	Non-album single

==== As featured artist ====
Title	Year	Peak positions	Album
Title	Year	SWE	Album
"Älska mig" (Robinholta featuring Myra Granberg)	2015	—	Non-album single
"Smutsiga barn" (Sebastian Stakset featuring Myra Granberg)	2020	—	Non-album single
"Glömma dig" (Rymdpojken featuring Myra Granberg)	2020	—	Non-album single
"Bara för bra" (Petter featuring Myra Granberg)	2021	37	Non-album single
