= Bell (singer) =

Swedish singer and songwriter (born 2000)

- Born: Bell Mothander; 2000 (age 25–26); Stockholm, Sweden
- Origin: Hässelby, Sweden
- Genres: Pop; hyperpop
- Occupations: Singer; songwriter
- Years active: 2021–present
- Labels: EMI

Bell Mothander (born 2000), known by her stage name Bell, is a Swedish singer and songwriter. In 2022, her single "Misförstått" reached number-one on the Swedish charts. She was nominated in the category of Newcomer of the Year at the 2023 Grammis.

== Early life ==
Bell Mothander was born in Stockholm in 2000 and grew up in the suburb of Hässelby. She started writing songs as a child and started with hip-hop at the age of 11. Bell moved to Tingsryd to study music at gymnasium. In 2016, she went viral on Facebook with "Gatuvåld", a song written for young people who have died due to gun violence and street crime. She was subsequently invited to perform the song on Nyhetsmorgon. She spent over a year working on the song and released it on Spotify in 2017. After gymnasium, Bell attended Birkagårdens folkhögskola, a folk high school for one year, studying live music.

== Career ==
In June 2021, Bell signed a recording contract with EMI, and started a TikTok account later that year. Her debut single, "Bättre sent än aldrig", was released in January 2022. Later that year, a clip of her freestyle rapping over "Bonaqua" by Henric Edström became viral on TikTok. As a result, she and producer Jonathan Hellberg went into the studio to finish and record the song, titled "Misförstått", which was subsequently released as a single on 17 June. The single reached number-one in Sweden and has been certified Platinum by IFPI Sverige. The song also became popular in Norway, resulting in a remix with Norwegian rap group Roc Boyz. She was nominated in the category of Newcomer of the Year at the 2023 Grammis. Her debut EP, BRB...<3, was released on 24 May 2024. In 2025, Bell authored an easy read poetry collection based on her lyrics, which is part of a series aimed at encouraging young people to read.

In 2022, Bell classified herself as a pop musician, with influences of emo, hip-hop, indie rock and metal. Her later music has been described as hyperpop. She has looked up to hip-hop musician Daniel Adams-Ray since she was young, and names Olivia Rodrigo, Billie Eilish and Lil Nas X as influences.

== Personal life ==
Bell realised she was bisexual in high school and says her family was accepting so she did not need to come out. In an interview with Kingsize Magazine, Bell described herself as having a strong personality, which led to her being bullied in elementary and high school. Her social media handle @allahatarbell (transl. everyone hates Bell) was an act of reclamation following her experiences being bullied. She has also discussed struggling with anxiety and her mental health. In February 2025, Bell was announced as an ambassador for the mental health organisation Mind, in order to inspire people to open up and talk about mental health issues.

== Discography ==
=== EPs ===
- BRB...<3 (2024)

=== Singles ===
List of singles, with year released and chart positions
Single	Year	Peak positions		Certifications	Album
Single	Year	SWE	NOR	Certifications	Album
"Gatuvåld"	2017	—	—		Non-album singles
"Bättre sent än aldrig"	2022	—	—		Non-album singles
"Låtsas som att allt är bra"	2022	—	—		Non-album singles
"Är du inte trött på att vara du?"	2022	—	—		Non-album singles
"Missförstått"	2022	1	—	IFPI Sverige: Platinum	Non-album singles
"Missförstått" (Roc Boyz remix) (with Roc Boyz)	2022	—	16		Non-album singles
"Missförstått" (remix) (with Rami)	2022	82	—		Non-album singles
"Pang! Boom!"	2022	43	—		Non-album singles
"Ed Hardy"	2022	—	—		Non-album singles
"Genom eld"	2023	67	—		Non-album singles
"Som en vän" (with Peg Parnevik)	2023	77	—		Non-album singles
"Pollen" (with Papi Santana)	2023	50	—		Non-album singles
"Du e någon annans (ou na na na)"	2023	—	—		Non-album singles
"Festen" (remix) (with Irmeli)	2023	—	—		Non-album singles
"Konny" (with Tjuvjakt and Parham)	2023	— (Note: "Konny" did not enter the Swedish Singles Chart, but peaked at number sixteen on the Swedish Heatseeker chart.)	—		Tjuvjakt
"Raging Bull" (with Afasi)	2023	—	—		TBA
"Om du skulle gå (du gick)"	2024	—	—		BRB...<3
"TSM <3 (Pantamera!)"	2024	—	—		Non-album single
"Kramiz<3" (with Elias Hurtig)	2024	—	—		BRB...<3
"Jag mår inte bra </3"	2024	—	—		BRB...<3
"Nathalie"	2025	—	—		Non-album singles
"Opp og nikke" (with Broiler and Bargee)	2025	—	58		Non-album singles

=== Featured singles ===
- 2025: "Evigt liv" (Petter featuring Bell)
