= Tjuvjakt =

Swedish rap group

- Origin: Lidingö, Stockholm, Sweden
- Genres: hip hop; rap; hip pop
- Years active: 2012–present
- Members: Fredrik "Woodz" Eriksson; Olle Grafström; Jesper Swärd; Arvid Lundquist; Kid Eriksson
- Past members: Jonathan Holmquist
- Website: Official website

Tjuvjakt is a Swedish rap group from Lidingö, Stockholm. The group consists of members Fredrik "Woodz" Eriksson, Olle Grafström, Jesper Swärd, Arvid Lundquist and Kid Eriksson. As of March 2021, the group has released five studio albums. Tjuvjakt's most successful single yet is "Tårarna i halsen", which peaked at number six on the Swedish Singles Chart. In total, the song charted for 31 weeks. In 2020, the group released the single "Kärt återseende", which peaked at number 38 on the same chart. The EP Tomma fickor was subsequently released, peaking at number 26 on the Swedish Albums Chart.

== Discography ==
=== Albums ===
Title	Details	Peak chart positions
Title	Details	SWE
Man ska vara seriös	Released: 9 October 2013; Label: Mångata, Roxystars	—
Musik är ju kul	Released: 31 March 2014; Label: Mångata, Roxystars	—
Välkommen till Mångata	Released: 20 May 2016; Label: Mångata, Roxystars	19
Pojkvän	Released: 9 June 2017; Label: Mångata, Roxystars, Playground	4
Okokokokokokok	Released: 1 June 2018; Label: Mångata, Roxystars, Playground	6
Blåa jeans, tomma fickor	Released: 6 November 2020; Label: Mångata, Universal	26
Lov att leva	Released: 9 June 2023; Label: Mångata, Universal	27

=== Extended plays ===
Title	Year	Peak chart positions
Title	Year	SWE
Vems värld är det här?	2013	46
Tomma fickor	2020	26

=== Singles ===
Title	Year	Peak chart positions		Certifications	Album
Title	Year	SWE	NOR	Certifications	Album
"Tandtråd"	2013	23 (Note: "Tandtråd" was released as a single in 2013, but charted in Sweden in June 2017, before reaching a new peak in 2025.)	—	GLF: Platinum	Non-album singles
"Pipa" (featuring Organismen)	2014	—	—		Non-album singles
"Va händerå?"	2014	—	—		Non-album singles
"Cornflakes i sängen"	2016	— (Note: "Cornflakes i sängen" did not enter the Swedish Singles Chart, but peaked at number 12 on the Swedish Heatseeker chart.)	—		Välkommen till Mångata
"Smuggel"	2016	— (Note: "Smuggel" did not enter the Swedish Singles Chart, but peaked at number 12 on the Swedish Heatseeker chart.)	—		Välkommen till Mångata
"Tårarna i halsen"	2017	6	—	GLF: 3× Platinum	Pojkvän
"Mittenfingret upp"	2017	71	—		Pojkvän
"G-Unit & Canada Goose"	2018	14	—	GLF: Gold	Okokokokokokok
"Vårt år" (with Estraden)	2019	9	—		Non-album singles
"Sodavatten" (with Movits!)	2019	34	—		Non-album singles
"Stockholm" (with Petter)	2019	42	—		Non-album singles
"Apelsinskal" (with Newkid)	2020	11	—		Tomma fickor
"Kärt återseende"	2020	38	—		Tomma fickor
"Blåa jeans"	2020	— (Note: "Blåa jeans" did not enter the Swedish Singles Chart, but peaked at number 12 on the Swedish Heatseeker chart.)	—		Blåa jeans, tomma fickor
"Vaskar mina tårar"	2021	43	—		Lov att leva
"För evigt"	2021	74	—		Lov att leva
"En sekund" (with Erik Lundin)	2021	37	—		Lov att leva
"Fru gårman"	2023	— (Note: "Fru gårman" did not enter the Swedish Singles Chart, but peaked at number 1 on the Swedish Heatseeker chart.)	—	IFPI Sverige: Gold	Non-album single
"John Daly"	2023	35	—		Lov att leva
"Taggtråd" (with Adaam and Philippe)	2023	45	—		Non-album singles
"Cash"	2023	60	—		Non-album singles
"Durackord" (with Adaam)	2023	67	—		Non-album singles
"Konny" (with Parham and Bell)	2023	— (Note: "Konny" did not enter the Swedish Singles Chart, but peaked at number 16 on the Swedish Heatseeker chart.)	—		Non-album singles
"Bara vi, bara jag, bara du" (with Estraden)	2025	57	—		Non-album singles
"Tusen spänn" (with Fanny Avonne)	2025	1	20		Non-album singles
"Dagen efter"	2025	— (Note: "Dagen efter" did not enter the Swedish Singles Chart, but peaked at number 20 on the Swedish Heatseeker chart.)	—		Non-album singles
"Hos dig är jag stark" (with Newkid and Clayton)	2025	34	—		Non-album singles
"Stammis" (with Simon Strömstedt)	2026	57	—		Non-album singles
"När vi gräver guld i USA" (with Simon Strömstedt and Julia Glenmark)	2026	1	—		Non-album singles

=== Other charted songs ===
Title	Year	Peak chart positions	Album
Title	Year	SWE Heat.	Album
"Blommor"	2023	12	Lov att leva
