= Lilla Namo =

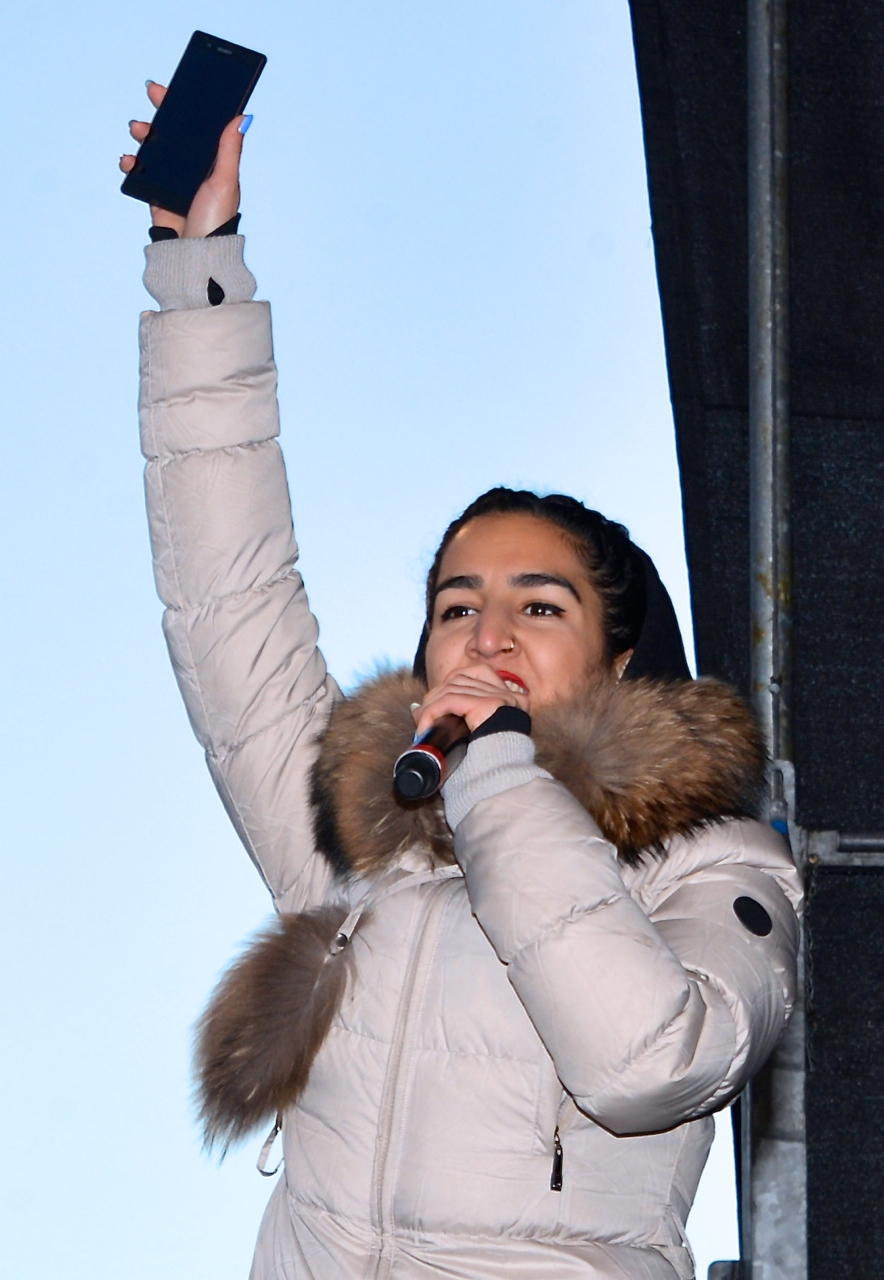
- Lilla Namo in 2013

Background information
- Born: Namo Marouf; 25 September 1988 (age 37)
- Genres: Hip-hop, pop
- Occupations: Singer, rapper
- Years active: 2012–present

Namo Marouf (born 25 September 1988), known professionally as Lilla Namo, is a Swedish singer and rapper.

In the summer of 2012, Lilla Namo released her first music single called "Haffa guzz". She has earlier co-operated with singers like Maskinen, Mack Beats, Mohammed Ali and Marcus Price. In 2012 she was also nominated in the category of hiphop/soul in that years P3 Guld-awards. In 2013 she sang in the rapper Petter's song "King" from the album Början på allt, and in 2015 she appeared in the song "Vandrar" from Petter's album Mitt folk.

In 2013 her debut album was released called Tuggare utan gränser.
