= Petter (rapper) =

Swedish rapper (born 1974)

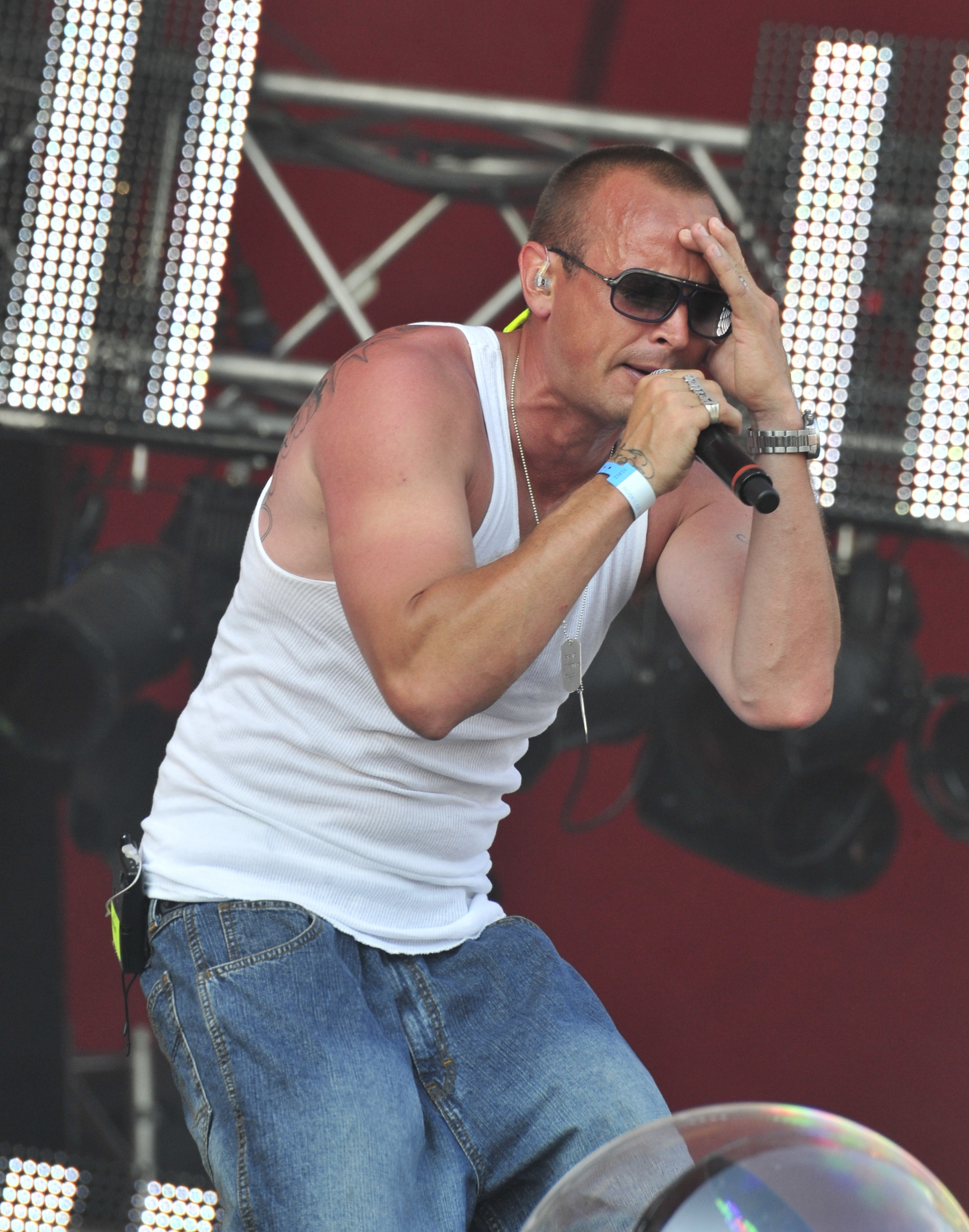
- Petter opening Orange Scene on Roskilde Festival 2009

Background information
- Also known as: Petter
- Born: Petter Alexis Askergren; 25 May 1974 (age 52); Sweden
- Origin: Stockholm, Sweden
- Genre: Hip hop
- Occupations: Rapper; singer
- Website: www.petter.nu

Petter Alexis Askergren (born 25 May 1974, who simply uses his given name Petter as a stage name, is a Swedish rapper from Stockholm, Sweden, rapping in Swedish. He debuted in 1998 with the album Mitt sjätte sinne (My Sixth Sense), which became a success and started the Swedish hip hop boom in the late 1990s and early 2000s. He owns a record company called Bananrepubliken (English: The Banana Republic). He also studied art history at Uppsala University for some time. He has also worked with the Norwegian rap producer Tommy Tee several times in his career. Petter also frequently works with Swedish disk jockey Patrik Elofsson who goes by the stage name DJ Sleepy.

In 2014 he hosted Musikhjälpen in Uppsala.

== Personal life ==
Petter is married to Michaela Fröstad Askergren, with whom he has four children: Ronin, Lexus, Vita, and Belle; he also has a fifth child, Alfons, from a previous relationship. He was diagnosed with ADHD in 2011.

== Discography ==
=== Studio albums ===
Album	Year	Peak positions		Certification
Album	Year	SWE	NOR	Certification
Mitt sjätte sinne	1998	5	—	GLF: 2× Platinum
Bananrepubliken	1999	1	34	GLF: 3× Platinum
Petter	2001	16	—	GLF: Gold
Ronin	2004	5	37	
P	2006	1	—	GLF: Gold
God Damn It	2007	12	—	
En räddare i nöden	2010	11	—	
Början på allt	2013	5	—	GLF: Gold
Mitt folk	2015	12	—	
Skeppsholmen	2016	3	—	
Lev nu	2018	6	—	
9818	2018	17	—	
Dö sen	2018	9	—	
Varholmsgatan	2020	24	—	
Hälsa Stockholm	2022	34	—	
Vart trött sen 98	2023	14	—	

=== Compilation albums ===
Album	Year	Peak positions
Album	Year	SWE
X – Greatest Hits	2008	31
3 Original Album Classics	2009	—
Samlar ut den	2010	3
Mitt sjätte sinne (Jubileumsutgåva)	2013	29
Lev nu dö sen	2019	—

=== Remix albums ===
- 2007: Skruvat och choppat av Afasi

=== EPs ===
- 2019: Så mycket bättre – Tolkningarna
- 2025: Petter med Getter

=== Singles ===
Single	Year	Peak positions	Certification	Album
Single	Year	SWE	Certification	Album
"Vinden har vänt"	1998	6	GLF: Gold	Mitt sjätte sinne
"Du vet att jag gråter" (with Kaah)	1998	51		Mitt sjätte sinne
"Mikrofonkåt"	1999	53		Mitt sjätte sinne
"Saker & ting" (featuring Eye N' I)	1999	2	GLF: Gold	Bananrepubliken
"Så klart!" (featuring Eye N' I)	2000	6	GLF: Gold	Bananrepubliken
"Rulla med oss" (featuring Timbuktu, PeeWee and Eye N' I)	2000	34		Bananrepubliken
"Tar det tillbaka"	2001	13		Petter
"Ey yo" (featuring ADL)	2001	35		Petter
"En sonett till dig" (featuring Luckz and Governor Andy)	2002	—		Petter
"Fredrik Snortare och Cecilia Synd"	2004	11		Ronin
"Repa skivan" (featuring AFC)	2004	28		Ronin
"Tidens tempo" (featuring Timbuktu)	2004	—		Ronin
"Det går bra nu"	2006	3	GLF: Gold	P
"Storstadsidyll"	2006	—		P
"God Damn It"	2007	14		God Damn It
"Logiskt" (featuring Säkert!)	2007	10		God Damn It
"Reflexion 07" (featuring Anna Ternheim)	2007	—		God Damn It
"Goda dagars magi"	2008	—		God Damn It
"Min click" (featuring Kihlen)	2008	—		X – Greatest Hits
"Slag under bältet"	2009	—		En räddare i nöden
"Fri nu"	2009	—		Non-album single
"För alla dom" (with Ison & Fille and Mogge)	2009	21		Non-album single
"Fast för evigt"	2010	—		En räddare i nöden
"Gör min dag" (featuring Magnus Carlson)	2010	47		En räddare i nöden
"Längesen" (featuring Veronica Maggio)	2010	2	GLF: Platinum	En räddare i nöden
"Stockholm i mitt hjärta"	2010	9		Samlar ut den
"Dansa din djävul"	2010	33		Samlar ut den
"En tuff brud i lyxförpackning"	2010	24		Samlar ut den
"Hjärtats ensamma slag"	2010	—		Samlar ut den
"Satellites"	2010	—		Samlar ut den
"Fulla för kärlekens skull"	2010	—		Samlar ut den
"Baksmälla" (with September)	2010	3	GLF: Platinum	Samlar ut den
"Krafter" (featuring Adolphson & Falk)	2011	—		En räddare i nöden
"Måste vidare"	2011	—		Non-album single
"Håll om mig" (with Daniel Adams-Ray)	2013	25	GLF: Platinum	Början på allt
"2013Live" (with Ison & Fille)	2013	—		Non-album single
"King" (with Lilla Namo)	2013	—		Början på allt
"Början på allt" (featuring Eye-n-I)	2013	—		Början på allt
"Kul på vägen" (featuring Sam-E and Sara Zacharias)	2015	67		Mitt folk
"Leva & dö" (featuring Daniel Boyacioglu)	2015	— (Note: "Leva & dö" did not enter the Swedish Singles Chart, but peaked at number two on the Swedish Heatseeker chart.)		Mitt folk
"Vi är"	2015	68		Mitt folk
"Mitt folk" (featuring Daniel Adams-Ray)	2015	— (Note: "Mitt folk" did not enter the Swedish Singles Chart, but peaked at number 18 on the Swedish Heatseeker chart.)		Mitt folk
"Svarta rävar" (featuring Linnea Olsson)	2015	— (Note: "Svarta rävar" did not enter the Swedish Singles Chart, but peaked at number eight on the Swedish Heatseeker chart.)		Mitt folk
"Följer mig" (featuring Rosh)	2015	—		Mitt folk
"Cityljus" (featuring Yasin and Blen)	2015	—		Mitt folk
"Pris på mitt huvud" (featuring Daniel Adams-Ray)	2016	75		Mitt folk
"Skärvor på mitt golv"	2016	—		Mitt folk
"Då var då, nu är nu" (featuring Mauro Scocco)	2016	— (Note: "Då var då, nu är nu" did not enter the Swedish Singles Chart, but peaked at number 11 on the Swedish Heatseeker chart.)		Mitt folk
"Se på mig nu" (featuring Linnea Henriksson)	2016	5		Skeppsholmen
"Toppen av ett berg" (featuring Madi Banja)	2018	4	GLF: Platinum	Lev nu
"En grej i taget" (featuring Mapei and MagnusTheMagnus)	2018	97		Lev nu
"Regnet" (featuring Molly Sandén and Sami)	2018	29		Lev nu
"Brevet" (featuring David Jassy)	2018	— (Note: "Brevet" did not enter the Swedish Singles Chart, but peaked at number 17 on the Swedish Heatseeker chart.)		Dö sen
"Blommorna" (with Miss Li)	2019	— (Note: "Blommorna" did not enter the Swedish Singles Chart, but peaked at number one on the Swedish Heatseeker chart.)		Non-album single
"Kung för en dag" (featuring Magnus Uggla)	2019	23		Så mycket bättre – Tolkningarna
"Stockholm" (featuring Tjuvjakt)	2019	42		Så mycket bättre – Tolkningarna
"Sanningen" (featuring Linnea Henriksson)	2019	31		Så mycket bättre – Tolkningarna
"Jag lovar"	2019	29		Så mycket bättre – Tolkningarna
"Bonfire"	2019	— (Note: "Bonfire" did not enter the Swedish Singles Chart, but peaked at number 14 on the Swedish Heatseeker chart.)		Så mycket bättre – Tolkningarna
"Astronaut" (featuring OBLX)	2020	82		Non-album single
"Astronaut" (Varholmsgatan version) (featuring Maja Francis)	2020	68		Varholmsgatan
"Dom får mig aldrig levande" (featuring Thomas Stenström)	2020	35		Varholmsgatan
"Ögonblick" (with Imenella)	2020	— (Note: "Ögonblick" did not enter the Swedish Singles Chart, but peaked at number four on the Swedish Heatseeker chart.)		Non-album singles
"Bara för bra" (featuring Myra Granberg)	2021	37		Non-album singles
"Förutom dig"	2021	57		Non-album singles
"Hundratusen" (featuring Gammal)	2022	— (Note: "Hundratusen" did not enter the Swedish Singellista Chart, but peaked at number 15 on the Swedish Heatseeker Chart.)		Hälsa Stockholm
"Komma över dig" (featuring Benjamin Ingrosso)	2022	23		Hälsa Stockholm
"Tar det tillbaka igen" (with Adaam)	2023	26		Vart trött sen 98
"Längesen (Epilog)" (with Simon Superti)	2023	28		Vart trött sen 98
"Skimmer" (featuring Reyn)	2024	— (Note: "Skimmer" did not enter the Swedish Singellista Chart, but peaked at number two on the Swedish Heatseeker Chart.)		Non-album single
"Thug" (featuring Adaam)	2025	16		Petter med Getter
"Getsnack" (featuring Imenella)	2025	—		Petter med Getter
"Röntgen" (featuring B.Baby)	2025	—		Petter med Getter
"Evigt liv" (featuring Bell)	2025	—		Petter med Getter
"Vinnare" (with Estraden)	2025	65		Non-album singles
"Bakom molnen" (with Eah Je)	2025	33		Non-album singles

=== Featured singles ===
Single	Year	Peak chart positions			Album
Single	Year	SWE	FIN	NOR	Album
"Crossing Borders" (Tommy Tee featuring Petter and Diaz)	1999	—	—	9	Norske byggeklosser
"Stockholm–Helsinki" (Fintelligens featuring Petter and PeeWee)	2000	—	1	—	Renesanssi
"Städer när jag blöder" (Saska featuring Thåström and Petter)	2000	30	—	—	Non-album single
"Fatta förstå" (Ayo featuring Petter)	2000	—	—	—	Non-album single
"Vår stil" (DJ Sleepy featuring Petter and Eye-n-I)	2000	—	—	—	Non-album single
"Vill ha!" (Feven featuring Petter)	2001	38	—	—	Hela vägen ut
"Giftig" (Mange Schmidt featuring Petter)	2007	2	—	—	Känslan kommer tillbaks
"Inga problem" (remix) (Snook featuring Veronica Maggio and Petter)	2007	—	—	—	Non-album single
"Håbet" (Dee Pee featuring Petter and Patrick B)	2009	—	—	—	Perspektivet
"Sanna min ord" (Stress featuring Petter and Johnel)	2011	—	—	—	Playlist
"Over" (Madcon featuring Petter)	2018	—	—	—	Contakt Vol. 2
"Kivijalka" (Fintelligens featuring Petter)	2018	—	—	—	Non-album single
"Sjel" (Adam Falk featuring Petter)	2018	—	—	—	Non-album single

=== Other charted songs ===
Song	Year	Peak positions	Album
Song	Year	SWE	Album
"Fyrverkeri" (Tjuvjakt featuring Petter)	2018	— (Note: "Fyrverkeri" did not enter the Swedish Singles Chart, but peaked at number 11 on the Swedish Heatseeker chart.)	okokokokokokok
"Lev nu dö sen" (featuring Vargas & Lagola)	2018	39	Lev nu
"Faller av" (featuring Thomas Rusiak, PeeWee and Eye-N-I)	2018	— (Note: "Faller av" did not enter the Swedish Singles Chart, but peaked at number six on the Swedish Heatseeker chart.)	9818
"Ikväll" (featuring Ana Diaz)	2018	71	Dö sen
"Barnängens ängar" (featuring Joel Alme)	2020	— (Note: "Barnängens ängar" did not enter the Swedish Singles Chart, but peaked at number five on the Swedish Heatseeker chart.)	Varholmsgatan
"Hälsa Stockholm" (featuring Molly Hammar)	2022	— (Note: "Hälsa Stockholm" did not enter the Swedish Singles Chart, but peaked at number seven on the Swedish Heatseeker chart.)	Hälsa Stockholm
"Glatta livet" (featuring Titiyo)	2022	— (Note: "Glatta livet" did not enter the Swedish Singles Chart, but peaked at number 14 on the Swedish Heatseeker chart.)	Hälsa Stockholm

== See also ==
- Swedish hip hop
