= Double Trouble (Will Ferrell and My Marianne song) =

2020 song performed by Will Ferrell and My Marianne

Song by Will Ferrell and My Marianne

from the album Eurovision Song Contest: The Story of Fire Saga (Music from the Netflix Film)
- Released: June 26, 2020
- Length: 2:54
- Label: Arista Records; Sony Music Entertainment
- Composer(s): Arnthor Birgisson; Rami Yacoub; Savan Kotecha
- Lyricist(s): Arnthor Birgisson; Rami Yacoub; Savan Kotecha
- Producer(s): Arnthor Birgisson; Rami Yacoub

"Double Trouble" is a song performed by Will Ferrell and My Marianne in the film Eurovision Song Contest: The Story of Fire Saga (2020). The song was written by Arnthor Birgisson, Rami Yacoub and Savan Kotecha.

== Context ==
In the film, the song is first sung by Fire Saga during the Söngvakeppnin, the Icelandic pre-selection for the Eurovision Song Contest. Their performance had gone wrong due to Lars (Will Ferrell) falling as he and Sigrit (Rachel McAdams) were being lifted from the stage. The song was then sung again during the semi-finals for the Eurovision Song Contest. It initially went well, but as Sigrit approached the hamster wheel her scarf got stuck in the spinning and made it fall off its axis, causing both Lars and Sigrit to be driven off the stage along with it. After they fall off, they get back up and finish the song to a dumbfounded audience.

== Charts ==
Chart (2020)	Peak position
Hungary (Single Top 40)	29
Iceland (Tónlistinn)	36
Scotland (OCC)	20
Sweden (Sverigetopplistan)	69
UK Singles (OCC)	76
