= Estraden =

Swedish pop group

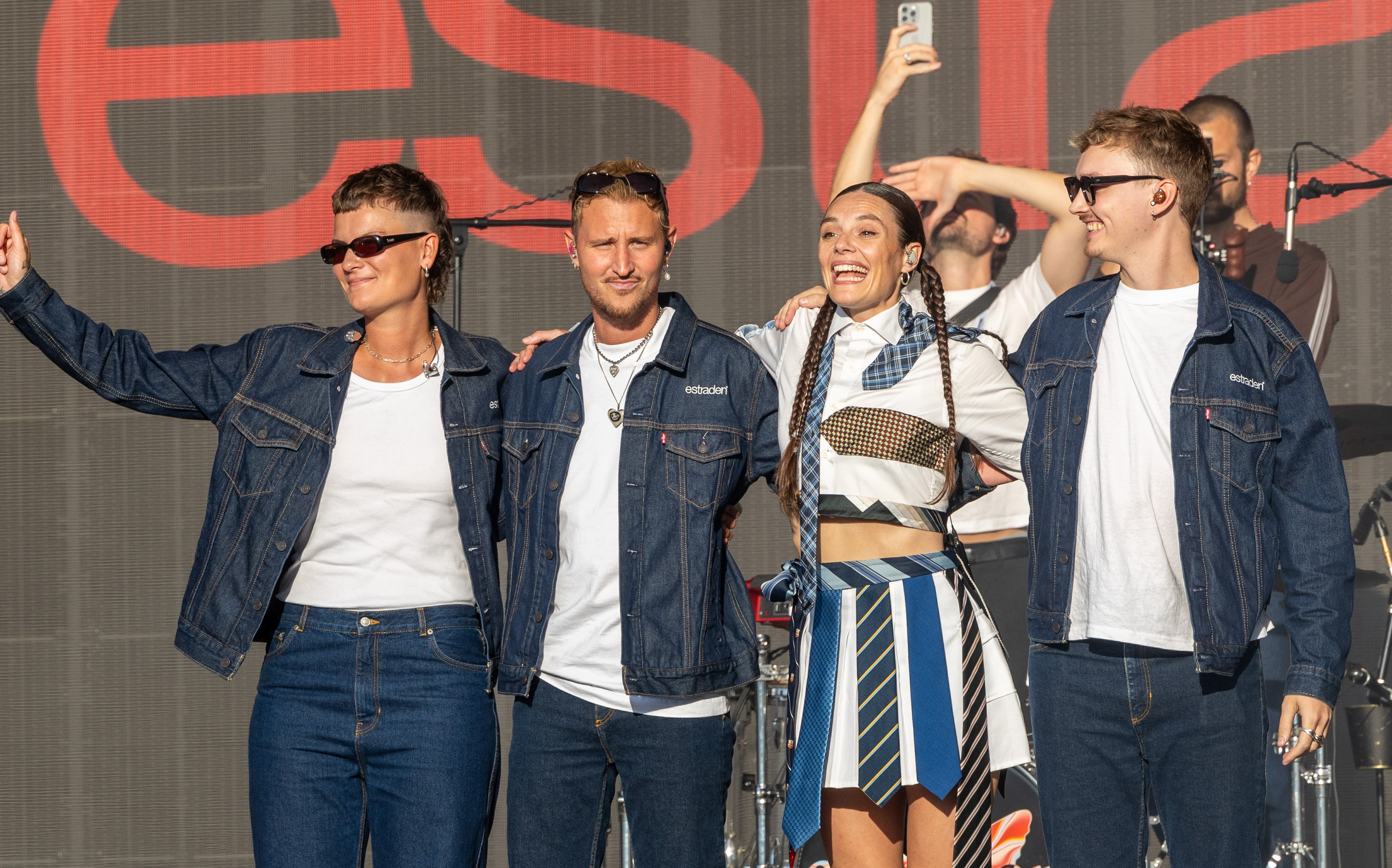
- Estraden in 2024

Background information
- Origin: Sweden
- Genre: Pop
- Years active: 2017–present
- Label: Sony Music
- Members: Carl Silvergran; Felix Flygare Floderer; Lou Elliotte
- Past members: Sandro Cavazza

Estraden, stylized as estraden, is a Swedish pop group consisting of Carl Silvergran, Felix Flygare Floderer, Lou Elliotte (Louise Lennartsson) and formerly also Sandro Cavazza. The group was formed in 2017 and releases its music through Sony Music. Until June 2019 the group's name was Estrad but due to a naming dispute, it had to change its name. The group's single "Mer för varandra", featuring Norlie & KKV, peaked at number one on the Swedish Singles Chart. In 2020, they released the singles "Det svåraste", "Dansar med mig själv" and "Aldrig mer vara du". The singles charted in the top 30 on the Swedish Singles Chart. The group released its debut studio album during the same year, entitled Mellan hägg och syrén. It debuted at number 13 on the Swedish Albums Chart.

== Discography ==
=== Albums ===
Title	Details	Peak chart positions
Title	Details	SWE
Mellan hägg och syrén	Released: 28 August 2020; Label: Sony Music; Formats: Digital download, streaming	13
20-Nånting	Released: 6 October 2023; Label: Sony Music; Formats: Digital download, streaming	38

=== Singles ===
==== As lead artist ====
Title	Year	Peak chart positions	Certification	Album
Title	Year	SWE	Certification	Album
"Mer för varandra" (with Norlie & KKV)	2018	1		Non-album single
"Vårt år" (with Tjuvjakt)	2019	9	GLF: 2× Platinum	Mellan hägg och syrén
"Vi två"	2019	55		Mellan hägg och syrén
"Inget som nu"	2019	69		Mellan hägg och syrén
"Smartare" (with Molly Sandén)	2019	28	GLF: Platinum	Mellan hägg och syrén
"Bra för dig" (with Victor Leksell)	2019	2	GLF: 3× Platinum	Mellan hägg och syrén
"Det svåraste"	2020	23	GLF: Gold	Mellan hägg och syrén
"Dansar med mig själv"	2020	27	GLF: Gold	Mellan hägg och syrén
"Aldrig mer vara du"	2020	20	GLF: Gold	Mellan hägg och syrén
"Sommarn är över" (featuring Eah)	2021	30		20-Nånting
"Kyssa dig nu"	2021	71		20-Nånting
"Säg till din mamma"	2022	— (Note: "Säg till din mamma" did not enter the Swedish Singellista Chart, but peaked at number 16 on the Swedish Heatseeker Chart.)		20-Nånting
"Tusen gånger om" (featuring Newkid)	2022	13		20-Nånting
"Gråter tillsammans över varandra"	2023	21		20-Nånting
"Mitt hjärta slår"	2023	72		20-Nånting
"Glömmer att glömma"	2023	35		20-Nånting
"Bästa var du"	2023	45		20-Nånting
"20-Nånting"	2023	57		20-Nånting
"Genom eld & vatten"	2024	27		Non-album singles
"Stanna här"	2024	86		Non-album singles
"Stenad i Stockholm" (with Simon Superti)	2024	— (Note: "Stenad i Stockholm" did not enter the Swedish Singellista Chart, but peaked at number 13 on the Swedish Heatseeker Chart.)		Non-album singles
"Varningsklocka"	2025	— (Note: "Stenad i Stockholm" did not enter the Swedish Singellista Chart, but peaked at number 10 on the Swedish Heatseeker Chart.)		Non-album singles
"Bara vi, bara jag, bara du" (with Tjuvjakt)	2025	57		Non-album singles
"Vinnare" (with Petter)	2025	65		Non-album singles
"Bitch"	2025	— (Note: "Bitch" did not enter the Swedish Singellista Chart, but peaked at number 17 on the Swedish Heatseeker Chart.)		Non-album singles
"—" denotes a single that did not chart or was not released in that territory.

==== As featured group ====
Title	Year	Peak chart positions	Album
Title	Year	SWE	Album
"För Evigt" (Jireel featuring Estraden)	2020	10	Non-album single
"Alla vill" (A36 featuring Estraden)	2024	21	Planet 36

==== Promotional ====
Title	Year	Peak chart positions	Album
Title	Year	SWE	Album
"Världen är inte vacker (Men det är vi)" (Swedish cover of Sophie Zelmani's "The World Ain't Pretty""	2024	— (Note: "Världen är inte vacker (Men det är vi)" did not enter the Swedish Singellista Chart, but peaked at number one on the Swedish Heatseeker Chart.)	Så mycket bättre Tolkningarna
"Jag borde gå" (Swedish cover of Seinabo Sey's "Shores")	2024	71	Så mycket bättre Tolkningarna
"Efter efterfesten" (Swedish cover of Alba August's "Summer of 99")	2024	—	Så mycket bättre Tolkningarna
"Underbart är kort" (Povel Ramel cover)	2024	—	Så mycket bättre Tolkningarna
"Duktig flicka" (Cover of Simon Superti's "Demoner")	2024	—	Så mycket bättre Tolkningarna
"Stanna här" (Swedish cover of Alcazar's "Stay the Night")	2024	—	Så mycket bättre Tolkningarna
"Stenad i Stockholm" (Per Persson cover with Simon Superti)	2024	—	Så mycket bättre Tolkningarna
"—" denotes a single that did not chart or was not released in that territory.

=== Other charted songs ===
Title	Year	Peak chart positions	Album
Title	Year	SWE	Album
"Minns det bästa"	2020	31	Mellan hägg och syrén

== Other appearances ==
Title	Year	Artist(s)	Album
"Sverige"	2017	Gulddreng	Farvel
