= Einár discography =

- Studio albums: 4
- EPs: 1
- Singles: 42

The discography of Swedish rapper Einár consists of four studio albums, one EP and 42 singles.

== Studio albums ==
Title	Details	Peak chart positions	
Title	Details	SWE	NOR
Första klass	Released: 7 June 2019; Label: Self-released; Formats: Digital download, streaming	1	19
Nummer 1	Released: 5 September 2019; Label: Self-released; Formats: Digital download, streaming	1	—
Welcome to Sweden	Released: 15 May 2020; Label: Self-released; Formats: Digital download, streaming	2	28
Unge med extra energi	Released: 28 September 2020; Label: Self-released; Formats: Streaming	1	29

== Extended plays ==
Title	Details
Einár	Released: 7 June 2022; Label: Self-released; Formats: Streaming

== Singles ==
=== As lead artist ===
Title	Year	Peak chart positions	Certification	Album
Title	Year	SWE	Certification	Album
"Duckar Popo"	2018	— (Note: "Duckar Popo" did not enter the Swedish Singles Chart, but peaked at number 16 on the Swedish Heatseeker chart.)		Non-album single
"Katten i trakten"	2019	1	GLF: 3× Platinum	Första klass
"Fusk" (featuring K27)	2019	2	GLF: 2× Platinum	Första klass
"Rör mig"	2019	3	GLF: Platinum	Första klass
"Akta mannen" (remix) (with 1.Cuz and Dree Low)	2019	20		Tre hjärnor
"Aldrig nånsin haft" (with Simon Superti and Dani M)	2019	27		Pusher II
"Paigons" (with Juice)	2019	18		Non-album singles
"Min nivå" (with Dree Low)	2019	2		Non-album singles
"Paff Pass" (with Nilo)	2019	26		Non-album singles
"Nu vi skiner"	2019	1		Nummer 1
"Mamma förlåt" (with Sebastian Stakset)	2019	9		Livet efter döden
"Tänker på mig" (with Black Moose and Danny Saucedo)	2019	20		Non-album singles
"Härifrån" (with Dizzy)	2019	3		Non-album singles
"Skrrt" (with K27)	2019	11		Non-album singles
"Drip 2 Hard"	2019	3		Non-album singles
"Sema7ni" (with Jelassi)	2019	39		Port 43
"Tesla" (with Macky)	2019	3	GLF: 2× Platinum	Non-album single
"Inlåst" (with Sebastian Stakset)	2019	— (Note: "Inlåst" did not enter the Swedish Singellista Chart, but peaked at number 16 on the Swedish Heatseeker Chart.)		Livet efter döden
"Frank Lucas"	2020	5		Welcome to Sweden
"Ungen" (with Stress)	2020	26		Non-album single
"Rymden och tillbaka" (with Stress)	2020	6		Welcome to Sweden
"Hell Ye" (with Abidaz and Haval)	2020	— (Note: While "Hell Ye" didn't enter the Swedish Singellista Chart, it peaked at number 3 on the Swedish Heatseeker Chart.)		Non-album singles
"Automat" (with Adel)	2020	83		Non-album singles
"Hundra" (with Adel)	2020	70		Non-album singles
"Show" (with Adel)	2020	65		Non-album singles
"Ingen lek" (with Dree Low and Thrife)	2020	37		Nu eller aldrig
"Tills vidare" (with Sebastian Stakset)	2020	—		Non-album singles
"Helt ärligt" (with Sebastian Stakset)	2020	—		Non-album singles
"Pop Smoke" (with 5iftyy and Moewgli)	2020	5		Unge med extra energi
"Luren skakar" (with Moewgli and 5iftyy)	2020	56		Non-album single
"Feelings" (featuring Sami)	2020	5		Unge med extra energi
"För stora namn" (with Dree Low)	2020	34		Non-album singles
"Sätter dom på plats"	2021	2		Non-album singles
"9 månader" (with Dani M)	2021	49		Non-album singles
"Trendsetter" (with 23)	2021	53		Non-album singles
"Voi" (with Dani M)	2021	19		Non-album singles
"Haparanda"	2021	14		Non-album singles
"Chiquita" (with 5iftyy)	2021	42		Non-album singles
"Dansa" (with Adaam)	2021	1		Non-album singles
"Fast här i trakten" (with VC Barre and Trobi)	2021	6		Non-album singles
"Din låt" (with Victor Leksell)	2022	1		Non-album singles
"Day One"	2022	2		Non-album singles
"Du & jag"	2023	1		Non-album singles
"Vill va med dig"	2023	1		Non-album singles
"Standard" (with A36)	2023	3		Non-album singles
"Dans från dig" (with Sara Kurt and Le Winter)	2023	1		Non-album singles

=== As featured artist ===
Title	Year	Peak chart positions	Album
Title	Year	SWE	Album
"Jag har en fråga" (BL featuring Einár, Dree Low and Aden x Asme)	2020	29	Non-album single
"vasägeru?" (L1NA featuring Einár and KD)	2020	— (Note: While "vasägeru?" did not enter the Swedish Singellista Chart, it peaked at number 12 on the Swedish Heatseeker Chart.)	TBA
"Fiendes fiende" (1.Cuz featuring Einár)	2020	11	FFF
"Gamora" (Hov1 featuring Einár)	2021	1	Barn av vår tid
"Hur mycket? (Pengar vill du ha)" (Hov1 featuring Einár)	2021	7	Barn av vår tid

== Other charted songs ==
Title	Year	Peak chart positions	Album
Title	Year	SWE	Album
"Humble" (with Adaam)	2019	— (Note: "Humble" did not enter the Swedish Singles Chart, but peaked at number 13 on the Swedish Heatseeker chart.)	Grindar
"Första klass"	2019	1	Första klass
"HipHop" (featuring Adaam)	2019	4	Första klass
"F mitt X"	2019	7	Första klass
"Röda sulor"	2019	15	Första klass
"Gäng"	2019	18	Första klass
"Bro Code"	2019	20	Första klass
"Toucha Fame" (featuring Thrife)	2019	5	Nummer 1
"Nr 1" (featuring Greekazo)	2019	6	Nummer 1
"Headshot"	2019	20	Nummer 1
"Fusk del 2"	2019	28	Nummer 1
"Inte samma" (featuring Adel)	2019	27	Nummer 1
"Ingen som varna mig"	2019	35	Nummer 1
"Nasty Thug" (Dizzy featuring Einár)	2019	— (Note: "Nasty Thug" did not enter the Swedish Singles Chart, but peaked at number two on the Swedish Heatseeker chart.)	Dirty South
"Ghetto Mamacita"	2020	6	Welcome to Sweden
"Welcome to Sweden"	2020	7	Welcome to Sweden
"Va Händish"	2020	10	Welcome to Sweden
"GoHardOrGoHome"	2020	20	Welcome to Sweden
"Vill du köra" (featuring Adel)	2020	31	Welcome to Sweden
"Outro"	2020	63	Welcome to Sweden
"Unge med extra energi"	2020	8	Unge med extra energi
"Brottslingar"	2020	46	Unge med extra energi
"Rockstar"	2020	64	Unge med extra energi
"Hammarby"	2020	31	Unge med extra energi
"Madagaskar"	2020	87	Unge med extra energi
"Psykos"	2020	99	Unge med extra energi
"Goodnight" (with Moewgli and 5iftyy)	2020	— (Note: "Goodnight" did not enter the Swedish Singles Chart, but peaked at number one on the Swedish Heatseeker chart.)	Unge med extra energi
"Draco" (with Dani M and Simon Superti)	2021	18	Push3r
"Lilla Nisse"	2022	1	Einár
"Annan värld"	2022	5	Einár
"Koppla av"	2022	2	Einár
"Kolla mig i ögonen"	2022	6	Einár

Other releases

- 2018: "Gucci"
