= Trendsetter =

Trendsetter may refer to:

== Music ==
- Trendsetter (Coi Leray album), 2022
- Trendsetter (Fler album), 2006
- "Trendsetter", hit single by Morten Abel
- "Trendsetter", single from Einár discography 2021
- "Trendsetter", song by punk rock band Tiny Masters of Today from Bang Bang Boom Cake

== Other ==
- Trendsetter Approval proofer made by Kodak

== See also ==
- Innovation, or trendsetting
- DJ Trendsetter (b.1987), also known by his stage name Trendsetter
- Trendsetters Limited pop band, active in the 1960s. The group is best known for featuring future King Crimson members Michael
- Trendsetter Media and Marketing music video promotion and production with offices in both New Jersey and Los Angeles
- Style Savvy: Trendsetters, known as Nintendo presents: New Style Boutique in the PAL region
