= VC Barre =

Swedish rapper (born 2003)

- Born: Baran Çelik; September 29, 2003 (age 23)
- Origin: Valsta, Märsta, Sweden
- Genre: Hip hop
- Years active: 2020–present
- Label: Gantofta

Baran Çelik (born 29 September 2003), better known as VC Barre, is a Swedish rapper of Kurdish origin He is best known for his collaborations with fellow rapper Adaam; the two grew up in the same neighborhood Valsta, Märsta, and co-founded the record label and hip hop collective Grind Gang Music along with D50.

== Biography ==
He is from Valsta, Märsta. In addition to growing up in Valsta, Çelik also grew up in London for a few years.

== Discography ==
=== Albums ===
Title	Year	Peak chart positions
Title	Year	SWE
Young & Strapped	2022	12
Asker	2024	3

=== Singles ===
Title	Year	Peak chart positions	Certification	Album
Title	Year	SWE	Certification	Album
"Nuförtiden" (with Adaam)	2020	— (Note: "Nuförtiden" did not enter the Swedish Singles Chart, but peaked at number two on the Swedish Heatseeker chart.)		Ordnade detta
"Fläta" / "Inte mitt krig"	2020	33		Non-album singles
"Bra trakt"	2021	—		Non-album singles
"Vvvalsta"	2021	3	GLF: Gold	Non-album singles
"Topp" (with Adaam)	2021	3		Non-album singles
"Fast här i trakten" (with Einár and Trobi)	2021	6		Non-album singles
"Dirty Kalle" (with TakeNoelz)	2021	10		Non-album singles
"VCFlow"	2022	8		Non-album singles
"Internet" (Spotify Studio 100 recording) (with 23)	2022	4		Non-album singles
"Sooys"	2022	24		Non-album singles
"Smutsig (Intro)"	2022	— (Note: "Smutsig (Intro)" did not enter the Swedish Singellista Chart, but peaked at number nine on the Swedish Heatseeker Chart.)		Non-album singles
"Säg till dom"	2022	100		Young & Strapped
"A.P.T.A"	2022	25		Non-album singles
"Grammis" (featuring Shenzi Beats)	2022	22		Non-album singles
"Catfish" (with 23)	2022	16		Non-album singles
"Devilish" (with 01an)	2022	18		Non-album singles
"Ooh"	2022	49		Non-album singles
"Noyy"	2023	19		Non-album singles
"Mamma"	2023	60		Non-album singles
"Pangpang"	2023	86		Non-album singles
"Soldat" (with Pablo Paz and Takenoelz)	2023	1		Asker
"Que Pasa?"	2023	18		Asker
"Betongen" (featuring 23)	2024	13		Asker
"Feeling" (with 1.Cuz)	2024	61		Non-album singles
"Italien"	2024	48		Non-album singles
"Timmy Turna" (with 01an)	2024	— (Note: "Timmy Turna" did not enter the Swedish Singellista Chart, but peaked at number two on the Swedish Heatseeker Chart.)		Non-album singles
"Morgonkvisten"	2025	84		Non-album singles
"Sexy Mr. Bean" (with NBLNation)	2025	— (Note: "Sexy Mr. Bean" did not enter the Swedish Singellista Chart, but peaked at number 14 on the Swedish Heatseeker Chart.)		Non-album singles
"Euro & kronor" (with NBLNation)	2025	68		Non-album singles
"Kalla sidan" (with 01an)	2026	— (Note: "Kalla sidan" did not enter the Swedish Singellista Chart, but peaked at number 1 on the Swedish Heatseeker Chart.)		Non-album singles
"Psykoser" (with Asme)	2026	39		Non-album singles
"Bungyjump" (with Asme)	2026	42		Non-album singles

=== Featured singles ===
Title	Year	Peak chart positions	Album
Title	Year	SWE	Album
"Grindar 2" (Adaam featuring VC Barre)	2020	95	Non-album single

=== Other charting songs ===
Title	Year	Peak chart positions	Album
Title	Year	SWE	Album
"Ruthless" (with Grind Gang)	2021	62	GrindTape
"Mikey"	2024	56	Asker
"Skaka landet" (featuring 1.Cuz)	2024	98	Asker
