= Björn Nilsson =

Björn Nilsson may refer to:

- Björn Nilsson (footballer) (born 1960), Swedish former footballer
- Björn Nilsson (dancer), dancer for the Danish Dance Theatre
- Björn Nilsson, musician with Slagsmålsklubben
- Björn Nilsson (rally driver) for 2007 World Rally Championship season
- Björn Nilsson, (born 1983) Swedish singer better known as Kapten Röd
