= Adaam =

Swedish rapper (born 2002)

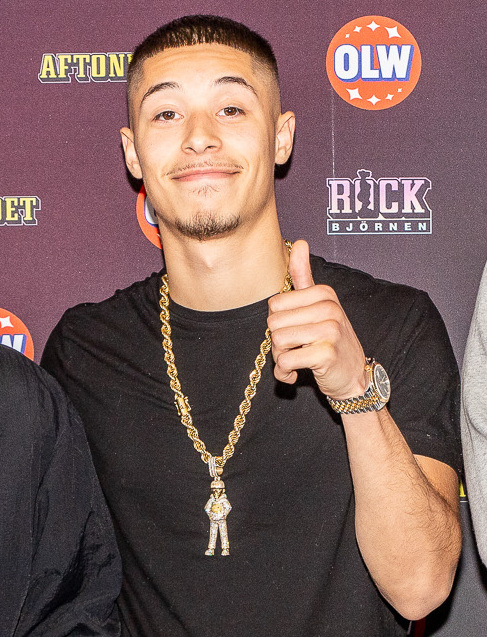
- Adaam in September 2024

Background information
- Born: Adam Lumbrar Pérez Jakobsson; 7 September 2002 (age 24); Märsta, Stockholm County, Sweden
- Genre: Hip hop
- Years active: 2018–present
- Label: Grind Gang Music

Adam Lumbrar Pérez Jakobsson (born 7 September 2002), better known as Adaam (stylised in all caps), is a Swedish rapper of Chilean-African-American descent. At the age of five, he moved to Valsta, Märsta, and grew up on the same estate as fellow rapper VC Barre; the two founded the record label and hip hop collective Grind Gang Music along with D50. Adaam started writing songs at the age of twelve and released his first single, "Trapstar", at fifteen. He is also known for his collaborations with fellow rapper Einár; their single "Dansa" reached the top of the Swedish singles chart upon Einár's death on 21 October 2021.

== Discography ==
=== Studio albums ===
| Title | Year | Peak chart positions |
| Title | Year | SWE |
|---|---|---|
| Topboy | 2020 | 9 |
| Myror i brallan | 2021 | 1 |
| Trapen till radion | 2022 | 1 |
| Gud ser allt | 2026 | 26 |

=== Live albums ===
- Grönan Live (2024)

=== EPs ===
| Title | Year | Peak chart positions |
| Title | Year | SWE |
|---|---|---|
| Grindar | 2019 | — |
| Ordnade detta | 2020 | 24 |
| Nya skolans ledare | 2025 | 23 |

=== Singles ===
| Title | Year | Peak chart positions | | Certification | Album |
| Title | Year | SWE | NOR | Certification | Album |
|---|---|---|---|---|---|
| "Trapstar" | 2018 | — | — | | Non-album single |
| "Wave" (featuring D50) | 2018 | — (Note: "Wave" did not enter the Swedish Singles Chart, but peaked at number eight on the Swedish Heatseeker chart.) | — | GLF: Gold | Grindar |
| "Konst från betong" | 2019 | 28 | — | GLF: Platinum | Non-album singles |
| "Hey Chica" (featuring D50) | 2019 | 18 | — | GLF: Platinum | Non-album singles |
| "La vida" | 2019 | 38 | — | | Non-album singles |
| "Garaget" (featuring D50) | 2019 | 55 | — | | Non-album singles |
| "Pull Up" | 2020 | 92 | — | | Ordnade detta |
| "Intro (Vae de frågan om)" | 2020 | 60 | — | | Ordnade detta |
| "Nuförtiden" (with VC Barre) | 2020 | — (Note: "Nuförtiden" did not enter the Swedish Singles Chart, but peaked at number two on the Swedish Heatseeker chart.) | — | | Ordnade detta |
| "Ballin" (with B.Baby and Buddha Vybez) | 2020 | 55 | — | | Non-album single |
| "Selfies" (featuring DnoteOnDaBeat) | 2020 | 86 | — | | Ordnade detta |
| "Kmr ihåg" | 2020 | — (Note: "Kmr ihåg" did not enter the Swedish Singles Chart, but peaked at number 12 on the Swedish Heatseeker chart.) | — | | Non-album singles |
| "Grindar 2" (featuring VC Barre) | 2020 | 95 | — | | Non-album singles |
| "Is i orden" (with DnoteOnDaBeat) | 2020 | 55 | — | | Non-album singles |
| "Magic" (with Grind Gang and Castrox) | 2020 | — | — | | Non-album singles |
| "Känslorna dansar" | 2021 | — | — | | Topboy |
| "A.D.A.M" | 2021 | 6 | — | | Non-album singles |
| "V.C" (with D50) | 2021 | — | — | | Non-album singles |
| "Topp" (with VC Barre) | 2021 | 3 | — | | Non-album singles |
| "Dimman" (remix) (with Robbz x Brookz and Papito featuring TakeNoelz and Ylva) | 2021 | — | — | | Non-album singles |
| "Dansa" (with Einár) | 2021 | 1 | 30 | | Non-album singles |
| "Hundred" (with Marti) | 2021 | — | — | | Non-album singles |
| "Grannar" (with Phillipe and Fu3go) | 2021 | 37 | — | | Myror i brallan |
| "Gone for the Night" (with Robbz x Brookz and Delara) | 2021 | — (Note: "Gone for the Night" did not enter the Swedish Singles Chart, but peaked at number 14 on the Swedish Heatseeker chart.) | — | | Non-album single |
| "ABTI" (with Aden) | 2022 | 8 | — | GLF: Gold | Myror i brallan |
| "Birthday" (with Masse and Dani M) | 2022 | 3 | — | GLF: Gold | Myror i brallan |
| "Flappy Bird" (with KD) | 2022 | — (Note: "Flappy Bird" did not enter the Swedish Singellista Chart, but peaked at number one on the Swedish Heatseeker Chart.) | — | | Non-album singles |
| "Fakka ur" (with Loam) | 2022 | 1 | — | GLF: 3× Platinum | Non-album singles |
| "Absolut" (with Lolo) | 2022 | 16 | — | GLF: Gold | Non-album singles |
| "2A" (with Phillipe and Fu3go) | 2022 | 18 | — | | Non-album singles |
| "Basement" (with Sickan) | 2022 | 57 | — | | Non-album singles |
| "Södermalm" (featuring Philippe and Takenoelz) | 2022 | 5 | — | GLF: Platinum | Non-album singles |
| "Wish List" | 2022 | — (Note: "Wish List" did not enter the Swedish Singellista Chart, but peaked at number one on the Swedish Heatseeker Chart.) | — | | Non-album singles |
| "Flex" (with Kairo Keyz) | 2023 | 23 | — | | Non-album singles |
| "Pick Me Up" (with Trobi) | 2023 | 31 | — | GLF: Gold | Non-album singles |
| "Axar" (with will.i.am, Icekiid, Takenoelz and Pablo Paz) | 2023 | — (Note: "Axar" did not enter the Swedish Singellista Chart, but peaked at number five on the Swedish Heatseeker Chart.) | — | | Non-album singles |
| "17" (with Pablo Paz and Takenoelz) | 2023 | 2 | — | GLF: Platinum | Trapen till radion |
| "Rockare" (featuring VC Barre) | 2023 | 58 | — | | Trapen till radion |
| "Ride with Me" (featuring Fu3go and Pablo Paz) | 2023 | 22 | — | | Trapen till radion |
| "Taggtråd" (with Tjuvjakt and Philippe) | 2023 | 45 | — | | Trapen till radion |
| "Tar det tillbaka igen" (with Petter) | 2023 | 26 | — | | Non-album singles |
| "Durackord" (with Tjuvjakt) | 2023 | 67 | — | | Non-album singles |
| "Bonanza" (with 25 and Kayen) | 2023 | 29 | — | | Non-album singles |
| "Tankeläsare" (with Mohela) | 2023 | — (Note: "Tankeläsare" did not enter the Swedish Singellista Chart, but peaked at number three on the Swedish Heatseeker Chart.) | — | | Non-album singles |
| "Young Thug på 1M" (with Dani M and Dan) | 2023 | — | — | | Non-album singles |
| "Person i nöden" | 2024 | 7 | — | | Non-album singles |
| "Limousine" (with Makar and Ilo 7araga) | 2024 | — | — | | Non-album singles |
| "Dårhus" | 2024 | 86 | — | | Non-album singles |
| "Sahbi" (with Dizzy and Trobi) | 2024 | 6 | — | | Non-album singles |
| "Casanova" (with Soolking) | 2024 | — (Note: "Casanova" did not enter the Swedish Singellista Chart, but peaked at number six on the Swedish Heatseeker Chart.) | — | | Non-album singles |
| "Fiesta" | 2025 | 32 | — | | Non-album singles |
| "Håller mig själv" (with Greekazo and Romanos) | 2025 | 2 | 41 | | Nya skolans ledare |
| "Trending" (with Greekazo and NBLNation) | 2025 | — (Note: "Trending" did not enter the Swedish Singellista Chart, but peaked at number four on the Swedish Heatseeker Chart.) | — | | Nya skolans ledare |
| "Heard of Me" (with Greekazo) | 2025 | — (Note: "Heard of Me" did not enter the Swedish Singellista Chart, but peaked at number four on the Swedish Heatseeker Chart.) | — | | Nya skolans ledare |
| "Stockholm är för stort" (with NBLNation) | 2025 | — (Note: "Stockholm är för stort" did not enter the Swedish Singellista Chart, but peaked at number 14 on the Swedish Heatseeker Chart.) | — | | Non-album singles |
| "Sthlm State of Mind" (with NBLNation) | 2026 | — (Note: "Sthlm State of Mind" did not enter the Swedish Singellista Chart, but peaked at number 2 on the Swedish Heatseeker Chart.) | — | | Non-album singles |
| "Waka Waka" (with NBLNation) | 2026 | — (Note: "Waka Waka" did not enter the Swedish Singellista Chart, but peaked at number 3 on the Swedish Heatseeker Chart.) | — | | Non-album singles |
| "Mama Out the Hood" (with Z.E and NBLNation) | 2026 | — (Note: "Mama Out the Hood" did not enter the Swedish Singellista Chart, but peaked at number 15 on the Swedish Heatseeker Chart.) | — | | Non-album singles |
| "La Liga" (with Greekazo, Z.E and Naod) | 2026 | 78 | — | | Non-album singles |

=== Featured singles ===
| Title | Year | Peak chart positions | Album |
| Title | Year | SWE | Album |
|---|---|---|---|
| "Selfmade (Cypher)" (Unga Scener featuring Robin LK, MPL and Adaam) | 2018 | — | non-album singles |
| "Någon annan" (S9ine featuring Adaam) | 2019 | — | non-album singles |
| "G-Step" (Siméon featuring Adaam) | 2021 | — | non-album singles |
| "Baddie" (Dani M featuring Adaam) | 2022 | 33 | non-album singles |
| "Thug" (Petter featuring Adaam) | 2025 | 20 | Petter med Getter |

=== Other charting songs ===
| Title | Year | Peak chart positions | Album |
| Title | Year | SWE | Album |
|---|---|---|---|
| "Grindar" | 2019 | 70 | Grindar |
| "Mami" (featuring Jamkid) | 2019 | — (Note: "Mami" did not enter the Swedish Singles Chart, but peaked at number four on the Swedish Heatseeker chart.) | Grindar |
| "Humble" (featuring Einár) | 2019 | — (Note: "Humble" did not enter the Swedish Singles Chart, but peaked at number 13 on the Swedish Heatseeker chart.) | Grindar |
| "HipHop" (Einár featuring Adaam) | 2019 | 4 | Första klass |
| "Ordnade detta" | 2020 | — (Note: "Ordnade detta" did not enter the Swedish Singles Chart, but peaked at number 12 on the Swedish Heatseeker chart.) | Ordnade detta |
| "Adaam & Eva" | 2021 | 91 | Topboy |
| "Topboy" | 2021 | — (Note: "Topboy" did not enter the Swedish Singles Chart, but peaked at number eight on the Swedish Heatseeker chart.) | Topboy |
| "Hela livet" | 2021 | — (Note: "Hela livet" did not enter the Swedish Singles Chart, but peaked at number 14 on the Swedish Heatseeker chart.) | Topboy |
| "Extra" | 2021 | 94 | GrindTape |
| "Adoomi" (with Grind Gang) | 2022 | — (Note: "Adoomi" did not enter the Swedish Singles Chart, but peaked at number 16 on the Swedish Heatseeker chart.) | GrindTape |
| "Tallrikar" (with Asme and Takenoelz) | 2022 | 22 | Myror i brallan |
| "Peppar eller lime" (with Kayen) | 2022 | — (Note: "Peppar eller lime" did not enter the Swedish Singles Chart, but peaked at number 18 on the Swedish Heatseeker chart.) | Myror i brallan |
| "Same Tomorrow" (with FI:VO and VC Barre) | 2022 | — (Note: "Same Tomorrow" did not enter the Swedish Singles Chart, but peaked at number 19 on the Swedish Heatseeker chart.) | Myror i brallan |
| "Gresset" (with Broiler) | 2023 | — (Note: "Gresset" did not enter the Swedish Singles Chart, but peaked at number seven on the Swedish Heatseeker chart.) | Trapen till radion |
