= Dani M =

Swedish singer and rapper (born 1990)

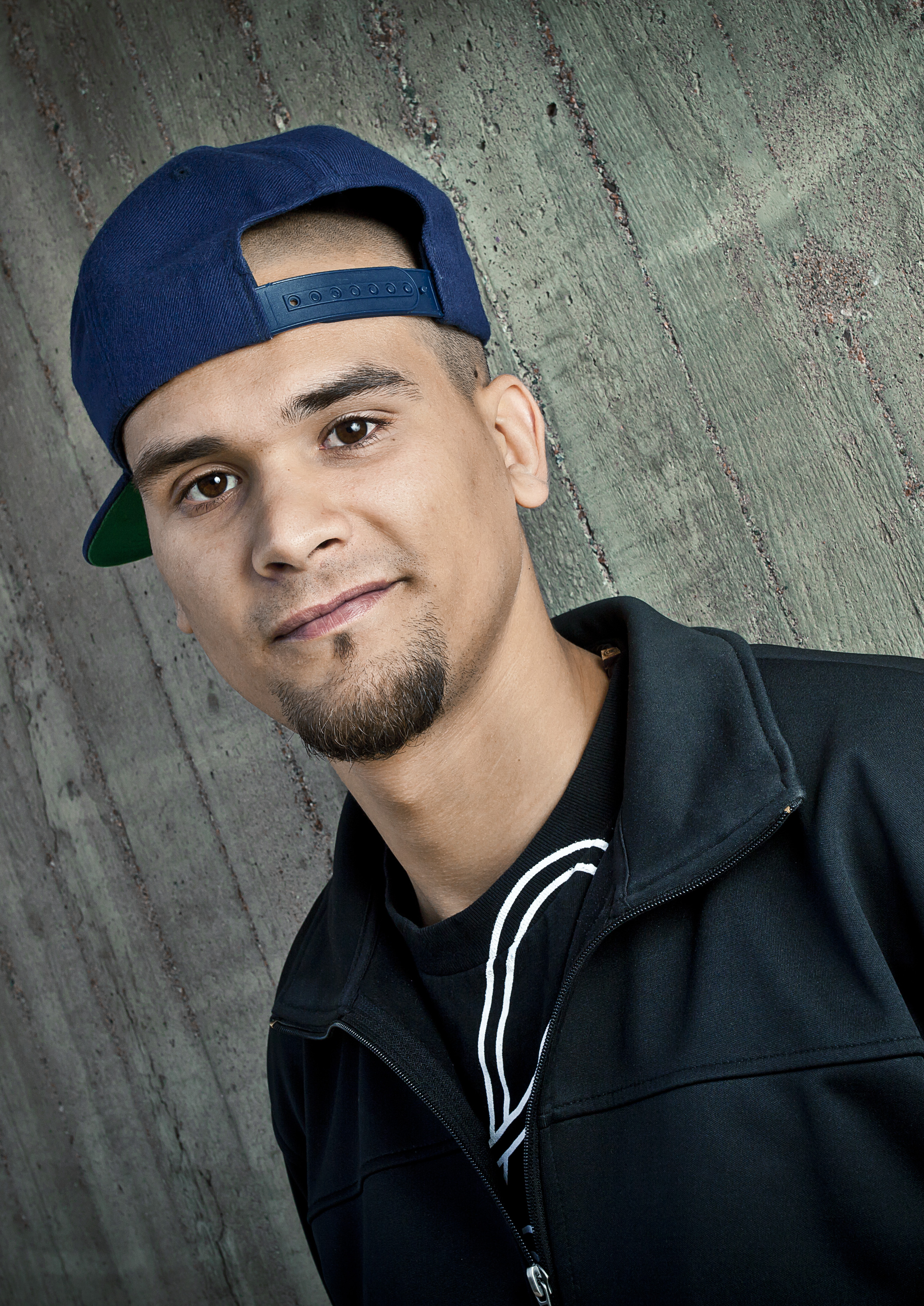
M in 2013

Daniel Monserrat, better known by his stage name Dani M (born in Gävle on 6 January 1990), is a rapper, reggae and hip hop solo artist from Uppsala, Sweden. Monserrat first gained recognition after being a featured singer in hit songs in 2012–2013 by Kartellen, Syster Sol and Labyrint. His own solo career thereafter gained popular acclaim alongside Syster Sol, both singers in the reggae & hiphop scenes. He quickly received top reviews among Swedish newspapers' music critics and music magazines.

He was born to a Finnish mother and a Venezuelan father and is the brother of Swedish rapper Moncho.

On several occasions, Montserrat has been criticised in Swedish media for making repeated antisemitic and conspiratory remarks. Montserrat himself has repeatedly denied this and responded to all media with a statement that he is not a racist or anti-semite, and that he himself is an immigrant in Sweden who "loves people from all the world, and has no racism towards jews". He also wrote on his official Facebook page that he was sorry for having "spoken clumsy".

== Discography ==
=== Albums ===
Year	Album	Peak positions	Certification
Year	Album	SWE	Certification
2014	Min grind	35	
2015	Regissören	31	
2017	Hela livet	17	
2018	Pusher (with Simon Superti)	2	
2019	Pusher II (with Simon Superti)	12	
2020	Demos & Skisser (The Lost Tapes)	9	
2021	Push3r	4	
2022	Amo (with Shenzi Beats)	5	

=== Singles ===
Year	Single	Peak positions	Album
Year	Single	SWE	Album
2013	"En sån som mej"	56	
2013	"Naiv" (featuring Jacco)	15	
2014	"Allting jag har"	34	Min grind
2015	"Nya Sverige"	65	
2016	"Trivialitet"	80	
2016	"Hela livet" (featuring Abidaz)	90	Hela livet
2016	"Nån annan" (featuring Jacco)	32	Hela livet
2017	"Cardio"	62	
2017	"Trender" (featuring Jireel)	41	Hela livet
2018	"Inte meningen" (featuring Z.E)	57	
2018	"Mera tid" (featuring Linda Pira)	61	
2018	"Oh Sh*t!" (with Abidaz)	—	
2019	"F.A.M.E (LeyLey)" (with Simon Superti)	3	Pusher II
2019	"Aldrig nånsin haft" (with Simon Superti and Einár)	27	Pusher II
2019	"Puff Puff Puff"	39	
2020	"Nåt vi inte är"	66	
2020	"Rude Bwoy" (with Abidaz)	— (Note: "Rude Bwoy" did not enter the Swedish Singellista Chart, but peaked at number three on the Swedish Heatseeker Chart.)	
2020	"Story of My Life"	— (Note: "Story of My Life" did not enter the Swedish Singellista Chart, but peaked at number eight on the Swedish Heatseeker Chart.)	
2020	"Sommartider i Stenhagen"	41	
2021	"9 månader" (with Einár)	49	
2021	"Voi" (with Einár)	19	
2021	"50/50" (with Simon Superti)	— (Note: "50/50" did not enter the Swedish Singles Chart, but peaked at number four on the Swedish Heatseeker chart.)	Push3r
2021	"Carlito's Way" (with Simon Superti)	83	Push3r
2021	"Dress 2 Impress" (with Kaliffa and Simon Superti)	65	Push3r
2021	"Chansa" (with Newkid and Jireel featuring Simon Superti)	39	Push3r
2021	"Draco" (with Einár and Simon Superti)	18	Push3r
2021	"365"	— (Note: "365" did not enter the Swedish Singellista Chart, but peaked at number one on the Swedish Heatseeker Chart.)	
2022	"Birthday" (with Masse and Adaam)	3	Non-album singles
2022	"Alicia" (with Masse)	22	Non-album singles
2022	"Amo"	26	Non-album singles
2022	"Paradis" (with 23 and Shenzi Beats)	11	Non-album singles
2022	"Baddie" (featuring Adaam)	38	Non-album singles
2022	"Vidare"	46	Non-album singles
2022	"Pretty Money" (with Shenzi Beats)	98	Non-album singles
2022	"Borz"	— (Note: "Borz" did not enter the Swedish Singellista Chart, but peaked at number two on the Swedish Heatseeker Chart.)	Non-album singles
2023	"PTSD" (with Sebastian Stakset)	39	Non-album singles
2023	"Real Ones"	79	Non-album singles
2023	"Banana" (with Ricky Rich)	52	Non-album singles
2023	"Palmerna"	34	Non-album singles
2023	"Mariachi" (with Jireel)	25	Non-album singles
2023	"Gangster värld"	57	Non-album singles
2023	"Young Thug på im" (with Adaam and Dan)	68	Non-album singles
2023	"Julbrevet" (with Le Winter)	— (Note: "Julbrevet" did not enter the Swedish Singellista Chart, but peaked at number 13 on the Swedish Heatseeker Chart.)	Non-album singles
2024	"Trasiga skor" (with Xpensive)	— (Note: "Trasiga skor" did not enter the Swedish Singellista Chart, but peaked at number 15 on the Swedish Heatseeker Chart.)	Non-album singles
2024	"Diamant" (with Xpensive)	— (Note: "Diamant" did not enter the Swedish Singellista Chart, but peaked at number two on the Swedish Heatseeker Chart.)	Non-album singles
2024	"Toxic" (with Xpensive)	— (Note: "Toxic" did not enter the Swedish Singellista Chart, but peaked at number five on the Swedish Heatseeker Chart.)	Non-album singles
2024	"Såg mig" (with Xpensive)	— (Note: "Såg mig" did not enter the Swedish Singellista Chart, but peaked at number nine on the Swedish Heatseeker Chart.)	Non-album singles
2024	"Trust Issues" (with B.Baby)	— (Note: "Trust Issues" did not enter the Swedish Singellista Chart, but peaked at number five on the Swedish Heatseeker Chart.)	Non-album singles
2024	"Upplopp" (with Greekazo)	91	Non-album singles
2024	"WiFi" (with Adel)	14	Non-album singles
2025	"Istället" (with Reyn and Newkid)	— (Note: "Istället" did not enter the Swedish Singellista Chart, but peaked at number 1 on the Swedish Heatseeker Chart.)	Non-album singles
2025	"Hiphop"	— (Note: "Hiphop" did not enter the Swedish Singellista Chart, but peaked at number 18 on the Swedish Heatseeker Chart.)	Non-album singles
2026	"Falska löften"	— (Note: "Falska löften" did not enter the Swedish Singellista Chart, but peaked at number 2 on the Swedish Heatseeker Chart.)	Non-album singles
2026	"Nya Sverige 2026"	— (Note: "Nya Sverige 2026" did not enter the Swedish Singellista Chart, but peaked at number 3 on the Swedish Heatseeker Chart.)	Non-album singles

Featured in

Year	Single	Peak positions	Album
Year	Single	SWE	Album
2012	"Mina områden" (Kartellen, Sebbe Staxx & Dani M)	26	
2012	"Broder del. 2" (Labyrint feat. Briz, Ras Daniel, Rootbound Williams, Kapten Röd, Essa Cham, Syster Sol, Slag Från Hjärtat, Donny Dread, Amsie Brown, General Knas, Dani M & Chords)	44	Broder EP
2015	"100 000 stenar" (Lani Mo featuring Dani M)	— (Note: "100 000 stenar" did not enter the Swedish Singles Chart, but peaked at number 13 on the Swedish Heatseeker chart.)	Non-album single

=== Other charted songs ===
Year	Title	Peak positions	Album
Year	Title	SWE	Album
2018	"Förebild"	81	Pusher
2018	"Tennäh"	— (Note: "Tennäh" did not enter the Swedish Singellista Chart, but peaked at number four on the Swedish Heatseeker Chart.)	Pusher
2018	"Moula"	— (Note: "Moula" did not enter the Swedish Singellista Chart, but peaked at number five on the Swedish Heatseeker Chart.)	Pusher
2021	"Pacman"	82	Demos & Skisser (The Lost Tapes)
2021	"De va inte jag"	— (Note: "De va inte jag" did not enter the Swedish Singellista Chart, but peaked at number four on the Swedish Heatseeker chart.)	Demos & Skisser (The Lost Tapes)
2022	"Feelings" (with Shenzi Beats)	— (Note: "Feelings" did not enter the Swedish Singellista Chart, but peaked at number eight on the Swedish Heatseeker Chart.)	Amo
2022	"Mami" (with Shenzi Beats)	54	Amo
2022	"30" (with Shenzi Beats)	— (Note: "30" did not enter the Swedish Singellista Chart, but peaked at number three on the Swedish Heatseeker Chart.)	Amo
2022	"Clap Clap" (with Shenzi Beats)	— (Note: "Clap Clap" did not enter the Swedish Singellista Chart, but peaked at number 10 on the Swedish Heatseeker Chart.)	Amo
