= Gudarna på Västerbron =

Studio album by Hov1
- Released: 6 April 2018
- Genre: Hip hop; pop
- Length: 38:35
- Language: Swedish
- Label: Universal Music
- Producer: Axel Liljefors Jansson; Martin Tjärnberg; Jens Resch; Oskar Linnros; Theo Kylin; Jeff Roman; Charlie Bernardo

Hov1 chronology
Hov1 (2017)	Gudarna på Västerbron (2018)	Vindar på Mars (2019)

Professional ratings
Review scores
Source	Rating
Aftonbladet	3/5 stars
Expressen	3/5 stars
Gaffa	4/6 stars

Gudarna på Västerbron is the second studio album by Swedish hip hop group Hov1, with the first being their self-titled debut album, Hov1. Gudarna på Västerbron was released on 6 April 2018 as digital download and on streaming platforms, through Universal Music. The album was recorded in a studio in Hornstull, Sweden and proved successful in the country, debuting at number one on the Swedish Albums Chart. As of 2 May 2020, the album has charted for a total of 108 weeks in Sweden. Gudarna på Västerbron also placed at number one on the Album year-end chart in 2018 in Sweden, as well as number seven on the chart for 2019. All songs were written by Hov1, while the album mainly was produced by the group's producer and member, Axel Liljefors Jansson.

== Critical reception ==
Gudarna på Västerbron received generally positive reviews from Swedish music critics. Expressen's reviewer Anders Nunstedt noted the songs "Pari", "Stan e mörk" and "Hon dansar vidare i livet" as highlights and also praised Hov1 for both using low-tempo and high-tempo beats. Moreover, he called the album "catchy". Natasha Azarmi of Aftonbladet stated that the album's strongest songs were the last three, calling the lyrics and melodies emotional. She opined that the album proves that Hov1's songwriting is "what the group is best at". Writing for Gaffa, Simon Lundberg stated that the album contains a mixture of "modern pop and hip hop" and he continued by praising the songs "Pari" and "Stan e mörk", saying that those tracks shows that Hov1 has matured since the group's previous releases.

== Track listing ==
All tracks are written by Hov1. Jireel shares songwriting credits on track 7.

No.	Title	Length
1.	"Redo"	3:21
2.	"OMG"	2:30
3.	"Gudarna på Västerbron"	4:02
4.	"Vill inte ha dig"	3:36
5.	"Heartbreak"	3:18
6.	"Född i juni"	3:28
7.	"Pari (feat. Jireel)"	3:02
8.	"Din mamma"	2:34
9.	"Stan e mörk"	3:06
10.	"Hon dansar vidare i livet"	4:08
11.	"Auf wiedersehen"	2:53
12.	"Förlåt (Bonus Track)"	2:37
Total length:		38:35

== Personnel ==
Adapted from Tidal.

- Axel Liljefors Jansson – producer, composing, songwriting, mixing (mixing on tracks 1, 2)
- Dante Lindhe – vocals, songwriting
- Ludwig Kronstrand – vocals, songwriting
- Noel Flike – vocals, songwriting
- Aryan Marzban – mixing (tracks 4, 5, 7, 11)
- Jens Resch – producer (tracks 4, 6, 8, 10), composing (track 1)
- Martin Tjärnberg – producer, (tracks 3, 5) mixing, (track 3) composer (track 3)
- Oskar Linnros – producer, (tracks 3, 5) composer, (tracks 3, 5) lyricist (tracks 3, 5)
- Sören von Malmborg – mastering, mixing (mixing on track 8)
- Johan Kronlund – mixing (mixing on tracks 6, 10)
- Hoffe Stannow – mastering (tracks 1, 3, 10)

== Charts ==
=== Weekly charts ===
Chart (2018)	Peak position
Swedish Albums (Sverigetopplistan)	1

=== Year-end charts ===
Chart	Year	Position
Swedish Albums (Sverigetopplistan)	2018	1
Swedish Albums (Sverigetopplistan)	2019	7
Swedish Albums (Sverigetopplistan)	2020	22
Swedish Albums (Sverigetopplistan)	2021	24
Swedish Albums (Sverigetopplistan)	2022	27
Swedish Albums (Sverigetopplistan)	2023	11
Swedish Albums (Sverigetopplistan)	2024	37
Swedish Albums (Sverigetopplistan)	2025	18

== Release history ==
Release formats for Gudarna på Västerbron
Region	Date	Format	Label
Various	6 April 2018	Digital download; streaming	Universal Music
