= Montague (album) =

- The cover art depicts Hov1's members. Clockwise from upper left: Kronstrand, Flike, Lindhe, Jansson.

Mixtape by Hov1
- Released: 10 January 2020
- Genre: Pop; hip hop
- Length: 26:05
- Language: Swedish
- Label: Universal Music
- Producer: Axel Liljefors Jansson; Jens Resch Thomason

Hov1 chronology
Vindar på Mars (2019)	Montague (2020)	Barn av vår tid (2021)

Montague is the debut mixtape by Swedish hip hop group Hov1. It was released on 10 January 2020 on streaming services as well as a digital download. The mixtape serves as the group's fourth number one "album" on the Swedish Albums Chart, where it debuted at that position. The mixtape is also the second of Hov1's albums to chart on the Finnish Albums Chart, where it placed at number 40. As previous releases, the mixtape was mainly produced by the group's producer and member Axel Liljefors Jansson, while all members share writing credits on all tracks. Jens Resch Thomason helped with producing two tracks on the mixtape: "Mitten av september" and "Brev ifrån en storstad". On the track "Kära Mamma", Swedish singer-songwriter Veronica Maggio is featured as both a songwriter and background vocalist. It marks the second collaboration between the group and the singer, with the first being the track "Horntullsstrand" on the group's third studio album, Vindar på Mars.

== Critical reception ==
Professional ratings
Review scores
Source	Rating
Dagens Nyheter	2/5 stars

Montague did not receive much attention from Swedish music critics at its release, but Dagens Nyheter's reviewer Mattias Dahlström gave the mixtape an overall negative review, calling it "tone-deaf" and too reliable on "streaming service" tracks. However, he highlighted the track "Svartsjuk" as the mixtape's best and stated that Montague, at times, expresses "charming, youthful enthusiasm."

== Track listing ==
Montague track listing
No.	Title	Writer(s)	Producer(s)	Length
1.	"Mitten av september"	Axel Liljefors Jansson; Dante Lindhe; Ludwig Kronstrand; Moonica Mac; Noel Flike; Tobias Carlsson	Jansson; Jens Resch Thomason	3:17
2.	"Våra vackra dar"	Jansson; Lindhe; Kronstrand; Flike	Jansson	3:53
3.	"Svartsjuk"	Jansson; Lindhe; Kronstrand; Flike	Jansson	3:22
4.	"Två sekunder på loftet"	Jansson; Lindhe; Kronstrand; Flike	Jansson	2:29
5.	"Kära mamma" (featuring background vocals by Veronica Maggio)	Jansson; Christian Waltz; Lindhe; Kronstrand; Flike; Veronica Maggio	Jansson	3:03
6.	"Sex i taxin"	Jansson; Lindhe; Kronstrand; Flike	Jansson	2:14
7.	"Brev ifrån en storstad"	Jansson; Lindhe; Joel Alme; Kronstrand; Flike	Jansson; Thomason	3:21
8.	"I Love U So Much"	Jansson; Lindhe; Kronstrand; Flike	Jansson	4:26
Total length:				26:05

== Charts ==
=== Weekly charts ===
Chart (2020)	Peak position
Finnish Albums (Suomen virallinen lista)	40
Swedish Albums (Sverigetopplistan)	1

=== Year-end charts ===
Chart	Year	Position
Swedish Albums (Sverigetopplistan)	2020	4
Swedish Albums (Sverigetopplistan)	2021	46
Swedish Albums (Sverigetopplistan)	2023	55

== Release history ==
Release formats for Montague
Region	Date	Format	Label
Various	10 January 2020	Digital download; streaming	Universal Music
