= Vårbynätverket =

Crime gang in Stockholm, Sweden

- Founder: Chihab Lamouri
- Years active: 2010 - present
- Territory: Vårby, Huddinge Municipality
- Ethnicity: Moroccans, Algerians, Tunisians
- Membership: 50 -100 members
- Activities: Illegal drug trade

Vårbynätverket (lit. 'the Vårby network') is a crime gang that was active from the 2010s onwards in Stockholm's organized crime. Based in Vårby district in Huddinge Municipality, Stockholm, it was led by gangster Chihab Lamouri.

== Trials ==
=== Encrochat evidence and trial ===
In 2020, the Swedish police launched an operation against the network and Lamouri was arrested in Spain, suspected of planning of gang-related murders and shootings, including plans against rivals, kidnappings, robbery, gross destruction of public property, extortion and aggravated weapon crime. The arrest was made based on materials from the EncroChat communication service that was cracked by the police in France with Swedish police gaining access to thousands of encrypted conversations of the gang via Europol. Lamouri was using the alias "Mujaheed" (Muslim warrior for his faith). Defense attorneys tried to invalidate Encrochat's evidence by claiming that it had been collected in violation of international agreements, but judges ruled that prosecutors could use it in the trial.

In April 2021, the trial against dozens of the network's members in Stockholm District Court began and continued until 16 June 2021. 27 people with connections to the network were sentenced to a total of 147 years in prison. Gang network leader Chihab Lamouri was sentenced to 17 years and 10 months in prison for attempted murder, aggravated assault and general destruction. Vårbynätverket is allegedly involved in a dozen shootings perpetrated in Stockholm.

=== Kidnapping of rapper ===
Prominent cases against Vårbynätverket included the brief kidnapping in April 2020 of a famous Swedish rap artist Nils Kurt Erik Einar Grönberg known as Einár. Two other Swedish rappers Yasin Abdullahi Mahamoud (better known as Yasin) and rapper Haval Khalil (known as Haval) were convicted and sentenced to 10 months in prison for Yasin and 2 1/2 years for Haval for complicity in the kidnapping. Einár was murdered on 21 October 2021 in a gun killing. He was due to testify against Vårbynätverket a few days later.

=== Possession of firearms trial ===
In the Södertörn District Court, the gang was involved in serious weapon crimes, including the confiscation by police of handguns, explosives, narcotics and money from a household occupied by an 18-year-old gang member and his collaborating family. Those proceedings ended with convictions of affiliated members in July 2021.

=== Kungens Kurva shooting trial ===
Gang members were also tried in the Kungens Kurva-rättegången case. Three individuals were charged with gang shooting that took place at a gas station in Kungens Kurva in January 2020. People in a passing car opened fire targeting to eliminate a rival gang leader to Vårbynätverket and trying to put an end to the rival gang's activities. Although the leader of that gang survived the shooting, a young friend of his sitting nearby was killed and the friend's girlfriend seriously injured in the head. Shortly afterwards, a 24-year-old individual Jonas El Gourari belonging to the Vårbynätverket was arrested. He was initially sentenced by the district court to 17 years and 10 months in prison, and upon appeal by prosecution to life imprisonment.

== Repercussions ==
The lawyer Amir Amdouni, defense attorney for the gang, was fired from his post as public defender for one of the murder suspects after disclosing classified information covered by preliminary investigation secrecy (Swedish: förundersökningssekretess). Amdouni and another defense lawyer Ekrem Göngör were expelled from the Swedish Bar Association for providing the criminals with classified information and for complicating criminal investigations. Both worked at the law firm Devlet, which handled several trials of Vårbynätverket gang criminals and allegedly communicated with the gang criminals under the pseudonyms "Kungen" (meaning The King) and "Prinsen" (meaning The Prince) as per the EncroChat recordings.

According to the Huddinge police in Sweden, the operation against Vårbynätverket and arrest of many key figures in it has led to a new generation of criminal gangs beginning to fill the void in the drug trade that the network left behind.
