= Lena Nilsson =

Swedish actress

Lena Nilsson (born 4 January 1962 in Stockholm) is a Swedish actress. Nilsson's film credits include Magnetisörens femte vinter and Videoman. Her television credits include Kaspar i Nudådalen, Glöm inte mamma!, and Morden i Sandhamn. She won the 2018 Guldbagge Award (Golden Scarab, Sweden's highest awards for film) for Best Actress in a Supporting Role for her performance in Videoman.

Nilsson was the mother of rapper Einár, who died after being shot in 2021.
