= Hov1 (album) =

Studio album by Hov1
- Released: 28 April 2017
- Genre: Pop; hip hop
- Length: 31:33
- Language: Swedish
- Label: Universal Music
- Producer: Axel Liljefors Jansson; Björn Hallberg; Martin Tjärnberg

Hov1 chronology
Hov1 (2017)	Gudarna på Västerbron (2018)

Hov1 is the self-titled debut studio album by Swedish hip-hop group Hov1. It was released on 28 April 2017 through Universal Music. The album proved successful in Sweden, peaking at number one on the Swedish Albums Chart. As of 1 May 2020, the album has charted for a total of 153 weeks in the country. The album was produced by Axel Liljefors Jansson, Björn Hallberg and Martin Tjärnberg. All songs were written by Hov1. Hov1 charted at the Album year-end chart in Sweden in 2017, 2018 and 2019, charting at position 3, 5 and 26, respectively. It has also been certified 2× platinum in the country.

== Track listing ==
All tracks are written by Hov1

Hov1 track listing
No.	Title	Length
1.	"Mandy Moore"	3:29
2.	"Hov1"	3:26
3.	"Gråzon"	3:57
4.	"Channel Orange"	3:47
5.	"Hjärtslag"	3:31
6.	"Runaway Bride"	2:23
7.	"Gift"	3:12
8.	"Sex"	3:09
9.	"Damn"	4:39
Total length:		31:33

== Personnel ==
Adapted from Tidal.

- Axel Liljefors Jansson – producer, composing, songwriting
- Aryan Marzban – mixing (tracks 1, 4, 6, 8, 9)
- Björn Hallberg – producer (track 1), composing (track 1)
- Martin Tjärnberg – producer, mixing, composer (tracks 2, 3, 7)
- Dante Lindhe – vocals, songwriting
- Ludwig Kronstrand – vocals, songwriting
- Noel Flike – vocals, songwriting

== Charts ==
=== Weekly charts ===
Chart (2017–2020)	Peak position	Certification
Swedish Albums (Sverigetopplistan)	1	GLF: 2× Platinum

=== Year-end charts ===
Chart	Year	Position
Swedish Albums (Sverigetopplistan)	2017	3
Swedish Albums (Sverigetopplistan)	2018	5
Swedish Albums (Sverigetopplistan)	2019	26
Swedish Albums (Sverigetopplistan)	2020	53
Swedish Albums (Sverigetopplistan)	2021	53
Swedish Albums (Sverigetopplistan)	2022	53
Swedish Albums (Sverigetopplistan)	2023	14
Swedish Albums (Sverigetopplistan)	2024	57
Swedish Albums (Sverigetopplistan)	2025	36

== Release history ==
Release formats for Hov1
Region	Date	Format	Label
Various	28 April 2017	Digital download; streaming	Universal Music
