= Kartellen =

Swedish hip hop group

Kartellen (English: The Cartel) was a Swedish gangsta rap hip hop group founded in 2008 by Kinesen and Babyface, who are both serving life sentences in Finland for accessory to murder. Kinesen was also allegedly involved in an infamous airport multi-million robbery in 2002.

The band used the materials sent by Kinesen with Babyface and others in prison and released them for downloads. It was fronted by Sebbe Staxx (real name Sebastian Stakset), Kaka, Maskinisten. Other members joining later included Lil' Star and Lani Mo Cribbe. Established musicians and producers also contributed to the effort.

Kartellen was a provocative hip hop act portraying crime and social problems in the suburbs in their albums and mixtapes. It was covered in mainstream media with some of their releases appearing in the Sverigetopplistan, the official Swedish Singles Chart.

Kartellen concerts were closely monitored by the Swedish police for their controversiality. Sebbe Staxx, with a 1-year prison record for charges related to robbery, receipt of stolen goods and weapon-related charges allegedly sent threatening messages on Twitter about the Swedish far-right politician Jimmie Åkesson who filed a complaint with the police. Sebbe Staxx later apologized to his mom and employer about his choice of words.

== Discography ==
=== Albums ===
Year	Album	Chart peak (SWE)
2012	Ånger & Kamp	–
2013	Ånger & Kamp Del 2	15
2016	Slutpläderingen	25

=== Mixtapes ===
- 2009: Kartellen är här
- 2009: Programrebeller
- 2011: Reflektion
- 2012: Blodspakt

=== Singles ===
Year	Single	Chart peak (SWE)	Album
2012	"Mina områden" (Kartellen, Sebbe Staxx & Dani M)	26	Ånger & Kamp
2012	"Ställ dig upp" (featuring Sebbe Staxx & Chrippa)	43	Ånger & Kamp
2013	"Skriker Ut" (featuring Sebbe Staxx, Admiral P & Robert Athill)	–	Ånger & Kamp
2013	"Underklassmusik" (featuring Aleks)	22	Ånger & Kamp Del 2
2013	"Svarta duvor & vissna liljor" (featuring Timbuktu)	15	Ånger & Kamp Del 2
2016	"Dominobrickor"	— (Note: "Dominobrickor" did not enter the Swedish Singles Chart, but peaked at number two on the Swedish Heatseeker chart.)	Slutpläderingen

Other (non charting)

- 2009: "Gå Loss" (with Lazee and Adam Tensta)
- 2010: "Bort med alliansen" (produced by Mack Beats)
