= Cuba Libre (Moncho song) =

Single by Moncho
- Released: 26 February 2018
- Recorded: 2017
- Length: 2:47
- Label: Universal Music Sweden
- Songwriters: Jimmy Jansson; David "Strääf" Solence; Markus Videsäter; Axel Schylström; Moncho

"Cuba Libre" is a song recorded by Swedish rapper Moncho. The song was released as a digital download on 26 February 2018 and peaked at number 31 on the Swedish Singles Chart. It is taking part, in Melodifestivalen 2018, and qualified to andra chansen from the third semi-final on 17 February 2018. It was written by Moncho along with Jimmy Jansson, David Strääf, Markus Videsäter, and Axel Schylström.

== Track listing ==
Digital download
No.	Title	Length
1.	"Cuba Libre"	2:47
2.	"Cuba Libre" (Instrumental)	2:42

== Charts ==
Chart (2018)	Peak position
Sweden (Sverigetopplistan)	31

== Release history ==
Region	Date	Format	Label
Various	26 February 2018	Digital download	Universal Music Sweden
