= Sebastian Stakset =

Swedish rapper, singer, author, and actor

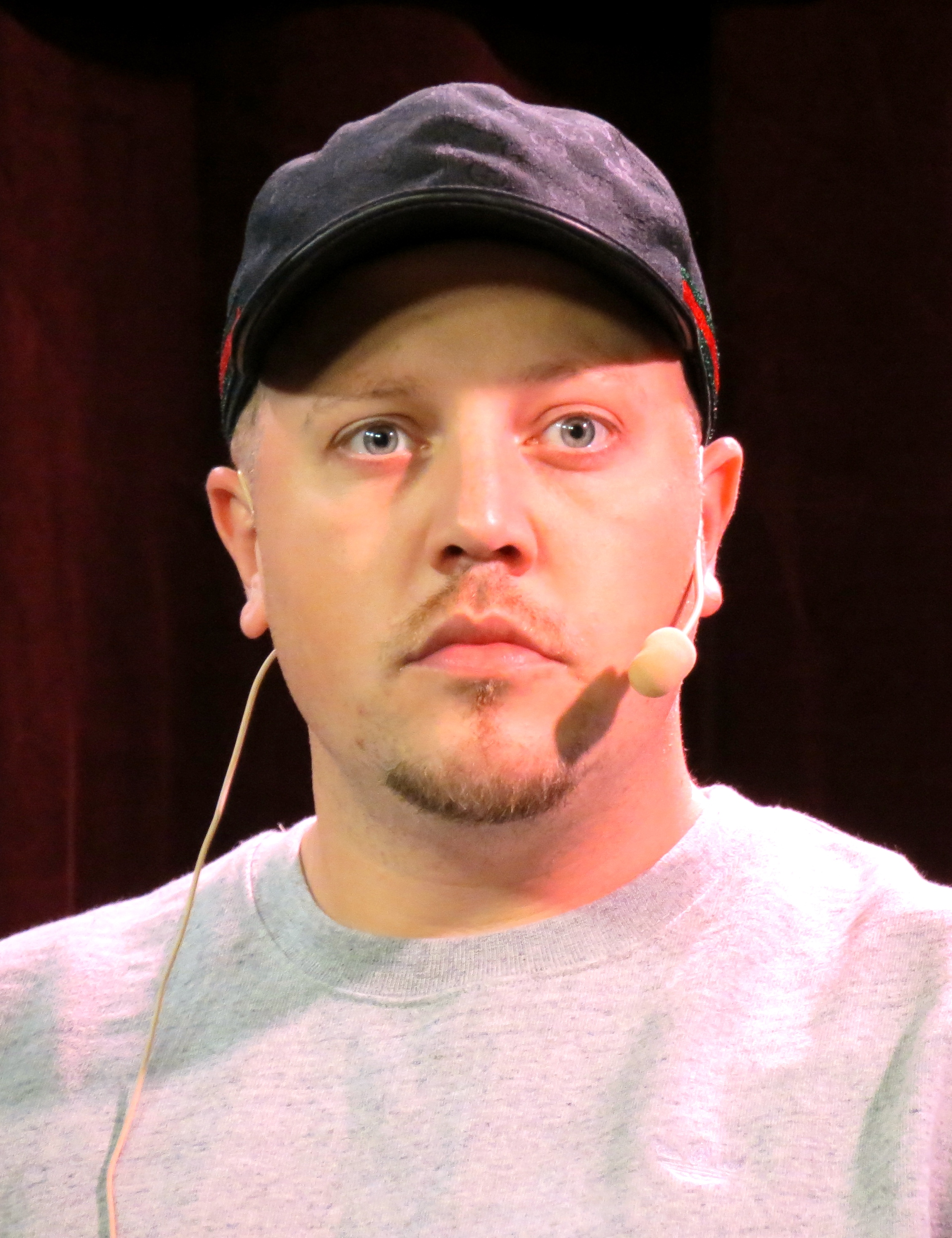
- Stakset in September 2015
- Born: Sebastian Emil Stakset Konstenius; 20 December 1985 (age 40); Stockholm, Sweden
- Other name: Sebbe Staxx
- Occupations: Rapper; singer; author; actor
- Years active: 2008–present
- Musical career
- Genre: Hip hop
- Instrument: Vocals
- Label: Universal

Sebastian Emil Stakset Konstenius (born 20 December 1985) is a Swedish rapper, singer, author, and actor. His 2019 single "Mamma förlåt", a collaboration with Einár, reached the Swedish top 10. A song by Einár featuring Stakset, "Ingen som varna mig", also reached the top 40 the same year.

== Discography ==
=== Albums ===
List of albums, with selected details and chart positions
Title	Details	Peak chart positions
Title	Details	SWE
Medan vi faller	Released: 4 November 2022; Label: Virgin Music Sweden; Formats: Digital download, streaming	10

=== Singles ===
Title	Year	Peak chart positions	Album
Title	Year	SWE	Album
"Mamma förlåt" (with Einar)	2019	9	Non-album single
"Trakten" (with Sinan)	2022	33	Medan vi faller
"Guns & Roses" (with Kristian Mecha)	2022	86	Medan vi faller
"Blöder från själen" (with 23)	2022	17	Medan vi faller
"Antisocial" (featuring Thrife)	2022	48	Medan vi faller
"PTSD" (with Dani M)	2023	39	Non-album single
