= Moncho =

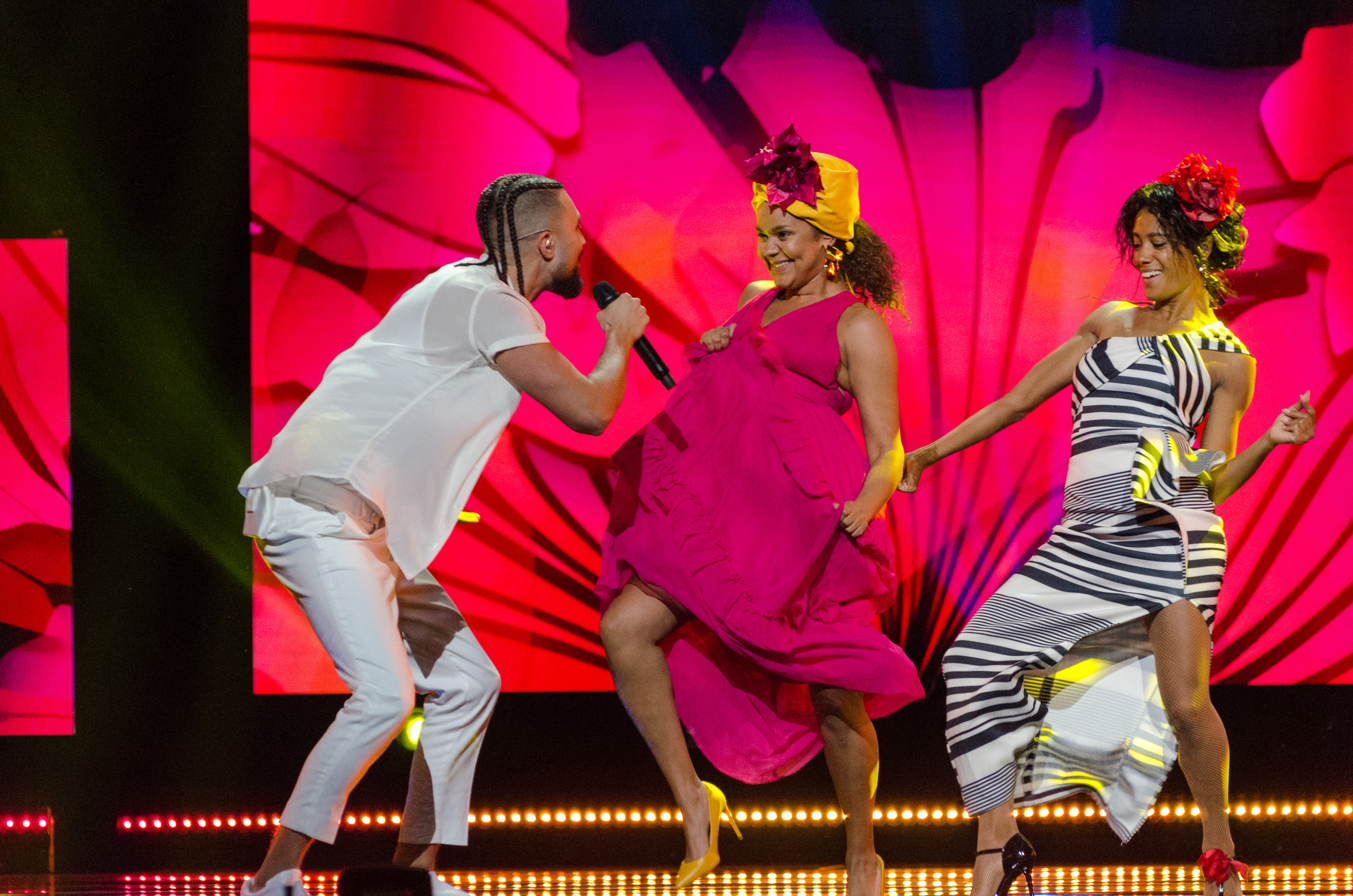
- Moncho performing at Melodifestivalen 2018

Background information
- Born: Ramón Marcos Enrique Monserrat; 4 March 1988 (age 38); Gävle, Sweden
- Origin: Uppsala, Sweden
- Genres: Hip hop; reggaeton; Latin pop
- Occupations: Rapper; singer; songwriter
- Years active: 2015–present
- Label: Universal Music Sweden

Ramón Marcos Enrique Monserrat (born 4 March 1988), better known by his stage name Moncho, is a Swedish rapper, singer, and songwriter. He competed in Melodifestivalen 2018 with the song "Cuba Libre", and qualified to andra chansen. He is the brother of Swedish rapper Dani M, and was born in Sweden to a Finnish mother and Venezuelan father.

== Discography ==
=== Singles ===
Title	Year	Peak chart positions	Album
Title	Year	SWE	Album
"Cuba Libre"	2018	31	Non-album single
