= Barn av vår tid =

Studio album by Hov1
- Released: 1 October 2021
- Length: 39:32
- Language: Swedish
- Label: EMI; Universal
- Producer: Axel Liljefors Jansson; Ian; Jens Resch Thomason

Hov1 chronology
Montague (2020)	Barn av vår tid (2021)	Jag önskar jag brydde mig mer (2024)

Singles from Barn av vår tid
- 1. "Barn av vår tid" Released: 15 January 2021; 2. "Gamora" Released: 5 March 2021; 3. "Tokken" Released: 7 May 2021; 4. "Hit the Club" Released: 20 August 2021

Barn av vår tid is the fourth studio album by Swedish hip hop group Hov1, released on 1 October 2021 by EMI and Universal. It charted atop the national albums chart in Sweden, and has been certified Gold by the Swedish Recording Industry Association.

The album's first three singles reached number-one in Sweden. The title track was released as the first single on 15 January 2021. Its cover, a pastiche of the album art of Kanye West's My Beautiful Dark Twisted Fantasy, features a pixellated photograph of Pernilla Wahlgren from a 2001 Café photoshoot. "Gamora", the second single, features rapper Einár and was released on 5 March 2021; its title comes from the comic book character of the same name. The third single, "Tokken" featuring Dree Low, was released on 7 May 2021. "Hit the Club" was released on 20 August 2021, and reached a peak of number three. In addition, "Räkna dagar" reached number-one upon the album's release.

== Critical reception ==
Professional ratings
Review scores
Source	Rating
Aftonbladet	2/5 stars
Borås Tidning	2/5 stars
Gaffa	1/6 stars
Göteborgs-Posten	2/5 stars
Dagens Nyheter	4/5 stars

Barn av vår tid received generally negative reviews from Swedish publications, with criticism aimed towards its shallow lyrics about girls, money and cars.

== Track listing ==
Barn av vår tid track listing
No.	Title	Writer(s)	Length
1.	"Tjuvheder"	Axel Liljefors Jansson; Dante Lindhe; Ian Persson Stiernswärd; Ludwig Kronstrand; Noel Flike	1:34
2.	"Räkna dagar"	Liljefors Jansson; Lindhe; Resch Thomason; Kronstrand; Flike	2:55
3.	"458"	Liljefors Jansson; Lindhe; Resch Thomason; Kronstrand; Flike	3:06
4.	"Gamora" (featuring Einár)	Liljefors Jansson; Lindhe; Persson Stiernswärd; Kronstrand; Nils Grönberg; Flike	2:45
5.	"Banksy"	Liljefors Jansson; Lindhe; Persson Stiernswärd; Kronstrand; Flike	3:08
6.	"Hur mycket? (pengar vill du ha)" (featuring Einár)	Liljefors Jansson; Lindhe; Persson Stiernswärd; Kronstrand; Grönberg; Flike	3:06
7.	"Hit the Club"	Liljefors Jansson; Lindhe; Persson Stiernswärd; Kronstrand; Flike	2:31
8.	"365"	Liljefors Jansson; Lindhe; Persson Stiernswärd; Kronstrand; Flike	2:29
9.	"Raindance"	Liljefors Jansson; Lindhe; Kronstrand; Flike	2:43
10.	"Tokken" (featuring Dree Low)	Liljefors Jansson; Persson Stiernswärd; Kronstrand; Flike; Salah Abdi Abdulle	3:14
11.	"Frankfurt"	Liljefors Jansson; Lindhe; Persson Stiernswärd; Kronstrand; Flike	2:50
12.	"Barn av vår tid"	Liljefors Jansson; Lindhe; Kronstrand; Flike	3:55
13.	"Certified"	Liljefors Jansson; Lindhe; Persson Stiernswärd; Kronstrand; Flike	2:06
14.	"Rigatoni"	Liljefors Jansson; Lindhe; Persson Stiernswärd; Kronstrand; Flike	3:10
Total length:			39:32

== Charts ==
=== Weekly charts ===
Weekly chart performance for Barn av vår tid
Chart (2021)	Peak position
Norwegian Albums (VG-lista)	17
Swedish Albums (Sverigetopplistan)	1

=== Year-end charts ===
Year-end chart performance for Barn av vår tid
Chart	Year	Position
Swedish Albums (Sverigetopplistan)	2021	16
Swedish Albums (Sverigetopplistan)	2022	4
Swedish Albums (Sverigetopplistan)	2023	4
Swedish Albums (Sverigetopplistan)	2024	13
Swedish Albums (Sverigetopplistan)	2025	23

== Certifications ==
Certifications for Barn av vår tid
Region	Certification	Certified units/sales
Sweden (GLF)	Gold	15,000^{‡}
^{‡} Sales+streaming figures based on certification alone.

== See also ==
- List of number-one singles and albums in Sweden
