= Vindar på Mars =

Studio album by Hov1
- Released: 17 May 2019
- Genre: Pop; hip hop
- Length: 30:36
- Language: Swedish
- Label: Universal Music
- Producer: Axel Liljefors Larsson; Jens Resch Thomason; Oskar Linnros

Hov1 chronology
Gudarna på Västerbron (2018)	Vindar på Mars (2019)	Montague (2020)

Vindar på Mars is the third studio album by Swedish hip hop group Hov1. It was released through Universal Music on 17 May 2019. The album was, alike its predecessors, successful in Sweden and it debuted at number one on the Swedish Albums Chart, thus making it Hov1's third consecutive number one album in the country. As of 3 May 2020, it has charted for a total of 50 weeks. Vindar på Mars subsequently placed at number two on the Album year-end chart in Sweden for 2019. The album also marked the first of Hov1's releases to chart outside of Sweden, peaking at number 25 on the Finnish Albums Chart. Vindar på Mars was mainly produced by the group's producer and member, Axel Liljefors Larsson, while all members share writing credits for the album. Swedish musician Oskar Linnros also produced substantial parts of the album, so did Jens Resch Thomason. Linnros shares writing credits on the album and Veronica Maggio participated in writing the song "Horntullsstrand". She also provided vocals on the track.

The album received generally positive reviews from Swedish music critics, with praise particularly directed towards the song "Horntullsstrand".

== Background ==
Following the release of Hov1's second studio album, Gudarna på Västerbron, the group felt that "something was missing" in their creation of their forthcoming studio album. They had the melodies and the lyrics, but wanted to evolve the album further. Therefore, the group decided to travel around the world to find inspiration. They ended up in Costa Rica, where they came to the conclusion that their music creation needed to change, since they didn't have "as much fun" anymore. The album revolves around this matter, about "letting go" and change, whether the group wanted it or not. Subsequently the album was complete and Hov1 described it as "nine self-experienced songs about life."

== Critical reception ==
Professional ratings
Review scores
Source	Rating
Aftonbladet	3/5 stars
Dagens Nyheter	3/5 stars
Nöjesguiden	Positive (Note: While the score is not directly mentioned in the article, Kritiker.se describes it as 4/6.)

The album received generally positive reviews from Swedish music critics. Aftonbladet's reviewer Natasha Azarmi praised the songs "Ma chérie" and "Horntullsstrand", while stating that she wished that Hov1 expressed more songwriting skills on the rest of the album. However, she continued by saying that Hov1 still "carries the voice of the youth in Swedish music." Writing for Dagens Nyheter, Sara Martinsson also praised the track "Horntullsstrand", while opining that Hov1 should "be careful not to fall too hard for the temptation to just write future sing-along classics." She also compared "Horntullsstrand" to earlier releases from Håkan Hellström. Sophie Winberg of Nöjesguiden wrote that the album depicts a record that is full of songs for "games at student parties and springs" and that it will become "soundtracks for love and breakups." Alike previous reviewers, Winberg noted the song "Horntullsstrand" as the album's highlight.

== Track listing ==
Vindar på Mars track listing
No.	Title	Writer(s)	Length
1.	"Smokebreak"	Axel Liljefors Jansson; Dante Lindhe; Ludwig Kronstrand; Noel Flike	3:18
2.	"Neon"	Jansson; Lindhe; Kronstrand; Flike; Oskar Linnros	3:06
3.	"Dö ung"	Jansson; Lindhe; Kronstrand; Flike; Linnros	3:38
4.	"Fri"	Jansson; Lindhe; Kronstrand; Flike; Linnros	3:04
5.	"Vindar på Mars"	Jansson; Lindhe; Kronstrand; Flike; Linnros	3:55
6.	"Älskling"	Jansson; Lindhe; Kronstrand; Flike	3:26
7.	"Ma chérie"	Jansson; Lindhe; Kronstrand; Flike	4:37
8.	"Horntullsstrand" (featuring Veronica Maggio)	Jansson; Lindhe; Ludwig Kronstrand; Flike; Veronica Maggio	3:57
9.	"Ensammast i värden"	Jansson; Lindhe; Kronstrand; Flike	1:35
Total length:			30:36

== Charts ==
=== Weekly charts ===
Chart (2019–2020)	Peak position
Finnish Albums (Suomen virallinen lista)	25
Swedish Albums (Sverigetopplistan)	1

=== Year-end charts ===
Chart	Year	Position
Swedish Albums (Sverigetopplistan)	2019	2
Swedish Albums (Sverigetopplistan)	2020	9
Swedish Albums (Sverigetopplistan)	2021	13
Swedish Albums (Sverigetopplistan)	2022	20
Swedish Albums (Sverigetopplistan)	2023	8
Swedish Albums (Sverigetopplistan)	2024	30
Swedish Albums (Sverigetopplistan)	2025	21

== Release history ==
Release formats for Vindar på Mars
Region	Date	Format	Label
Various	17 May 2019	Digital download; streaming	Universal Music
