= Labyrint (band) =

Swedish hip hop band

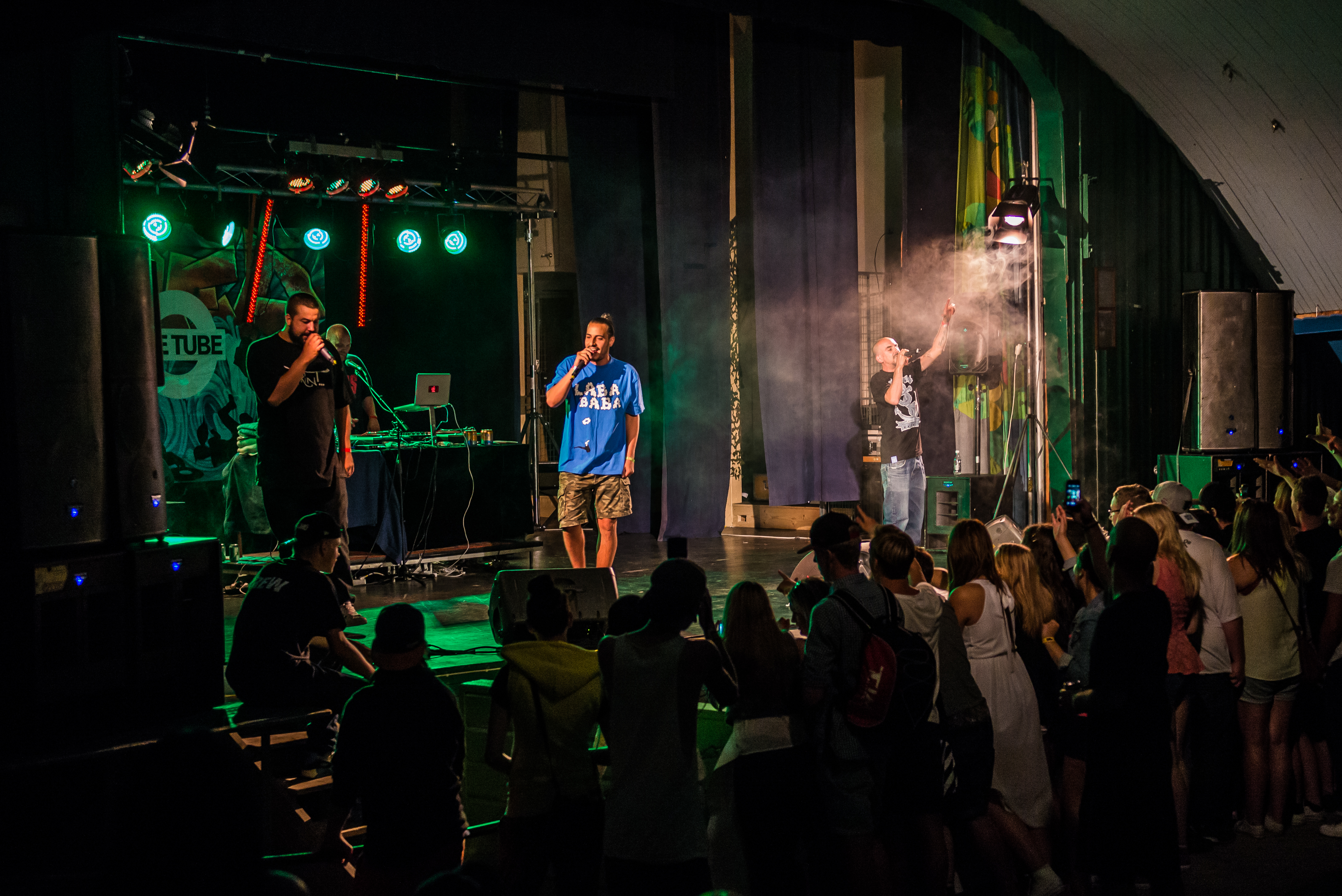

Background information
- Origin: Gottsunda, Uppsala, Sweden
- Genres: Hip hop
- Years active: 2007–present
- Labels: Universal Records
- Members: Aki; Jacco; Dajanko; Sai

Labyrint formed in 2007 was a Swedish hip hop music group from Gottsunda, Uppsala.

After performing for a number of years together, in 2007, they had a breakthrough with "Vår Betong" and in 2009 collaborated with Masse from The Salazar Brothers to release a mixtape that became popular through downloads on Whoa.se website.

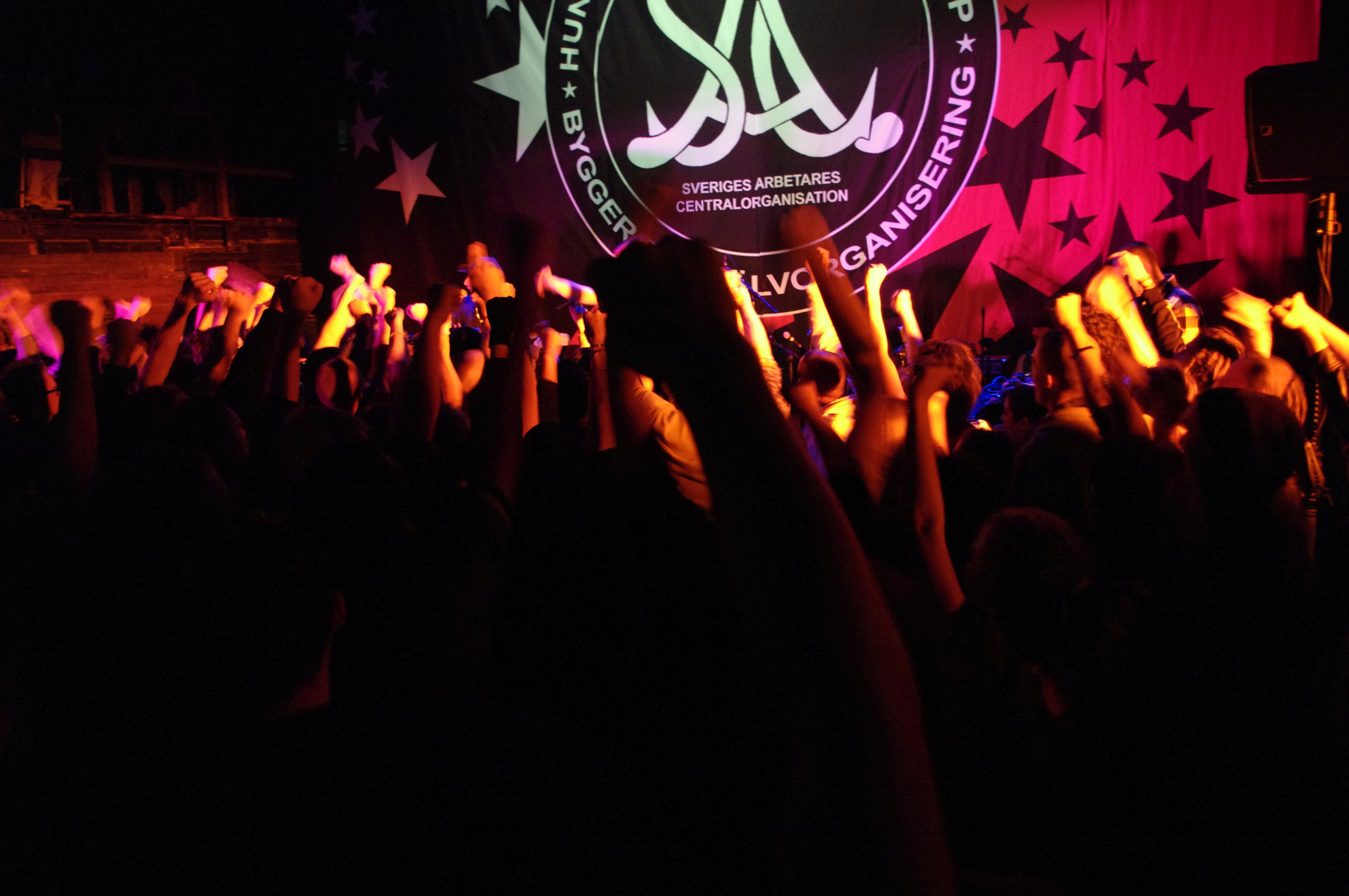
Labyrint, a socially conscious band, performing at the centenary of the SAC trade union

Based on these successes, Universal Records expressed interest signing them to the label in 2011. However their launch was marred by Växjö cancelling their show after advice from the security authorities about the controversial use of cannabis during their gigs. This turned into a public debate in the media about drugs in hip hop culture. Labyrint's debut studio album on the label was Labababa that was released on 30 November 2011 in the wake of the controversy. It included collaborations with Kapten Röd and Gregor.

The band is best known for the 2012 "Broder del 2" a rap anthem that included Labyrint with great number of rap and urban acts like Briz, Ras Daniel, Rootbound Williams, Kapten Röd, Essa Cham, Syster Sol, Slag Från Hjärtat, Donny Dread, Amsie Brown, General Knas, Dani M & Chords.

In 2014, Labyrint released their second studio album on Universal titled Garalaowit becoming their biggest selling release.

== Members ==
The band is multiethnic and it is made up of:

- Aki (Aleksi Swallow) – rapper / songwriter. He is of Finnish descent on the maternal side and African-American/English descent on the paternal side.
- Jacco (Jacques Mattar) – rapper / songwriter. He is of Palestinian descent.
- Dajanko (Dejan Milacic) – rapper / songwriter. He is of Serbian descent.
- Sai (Simon Wimmerberg) – DJ / producer. He is of Finnish descent on his maternal side.

== Discography ==
=== Albums ===
Year	Album	Peak positions	Notes
Year	Album	SWE	Notes
2011	Labababa	–	Track list: 1. "Intro" – 3:00; 2. "Kärleken?" – 3:56; 3. "Wärsta wiben" (feat. Kapten Röd) – 3:41; 4. "Ortens Favoriter" – 4:07; 5. "Ensam" – 3:29; 6. "Broder" (feat. Amsie Brown) – 4:44; 7. "25:e (Jag hatar mitt jobb)" – 3:50; 8. "Arbetsmoral" – 3:36; 9. "Hasslade" – 3:09; 10. "This Meck paus Was Brought to You by Labababa" – 1:15; 11. "Vill Ha Dig" – 3:43; 12. "Gatubarn" (feat. Rootbound Williams) – 4:16; 13. "Tribulations" – 4:33; 14. "Fortfarande Ont" – 4:50; 15. "Mitt i maten" (feat. Sacke O Verron) – 2:36; 16. "Släpp henne fri" (feat. Helt Off) – 5:00; 17. "Välkommen hem" (feat. Dani M) – 4:04; 18. "Smutsfolk" (bonus track) – 3:25; 19. "Vatroru?" (bonus track) – 4:03
2014	Garalaowit	3	Track list: 1. "Intro"; 2. "Swerje" (feat. Dani M); 3. "Fortfarande gsunda" 4. "Jagbaesån"; 5. "Bublaks år" (Skit); 6. "Bizzlord"; 7. "Sagostunden intro" (feat. Mattias Rosendahl); 8. "Sagostunden e slut" 9. "Motattack"; 10. "Starta inget!" 11. "Chilla lide" (feat. Amsie Brown); 12. "Se upp!" 13. "Officiella kampanjlåten" 14. "Fakkin fin" 15. "Cypher i bunkern" (feat. Linda Pira, Stor, Mohammed Ali, Carlito, Dani M & Amsie Brown); 16. "Prata ut"

=== EPs ===
Year	Title	Tracks
2010	Kärleken?	"Kärleken?" "Hat!"
2011	Miljonprogrammerade	"Jajajaja" "Vatroru?" "Tribulations" "Evil" "Miljonprogrammerade"
2011	Hasslade	"Aboooow" "Hasslade" "Eldupphör" "Smutsfolk"
2012	Ortens favoriter	
2012	Broder EP	"L-A-B-Y-R-I-N-T" "Läs på" "Skanka sönder oss" "Jag vill fortfarande ha dig" "Broder del.2"

=== Singles ===
as Labyrint

Year	Single	Peak positions	Album
Year	Single	SWE	Album
2012	"Broder del 2" (Labyrint feat. Briz, Ras Daniel, Rootbound Williams, Kapten Röd, Essa Cham, Syster Sol, Slag Från Hjärtat, Donny Dread, Amsie Brown, General Knas, Dani M & Chords)	44	Broder (EP)
2013	"Fakkin Fin"	25	Garalaowit
2014	"Chilla lide" (feat. Amsie Brown)	28	Garalaowit
2017	"Pang Pang"	60	
2017	"Vi dansar"	— (Note: "Vi dansar" did not enter the Swedish Singellista, but peaked at number six on the Heatseeker chart.)	
2018	"Så ajaib"	60	
2019	"Ghettoliv"	98	

== Solo projects ==
=== Aki ===
The band member and rapper Aki (Aleksi Swallow) of the band Labyrint has also done a solo collaboration with Kapten Röd resulting in a Number 1 hit for him in "När solen går ner".

Year	Single	Peak positions	Certification	Album
Year	Single	SWE	Certification	Album
2012	"När solen går ner" (Aki feat. Kapten Röd)	1	3× Platinum	
