= Jag önskar jag brydde mig mer =

Studio album by Hov1
- Released: 10 May 2024
- Genre: Hip hop
- Length: 32:04
- Language: Swedish
- Label: EMI; Universal
- Producer: Axel Liljefors Jansson; Ian Persson Stiernswärd

Hov1 chronology
| Barn av vår tid (2021) | Jag önskar jag brydde mig mer (2024) | ... men det gör jag egentligen (2024) |

Singles from Jag önskar jag brydde mig mer
- 1. "Lilla B" Released: 24 March 2023; 2. "Jag önskar jag brydde mig mer" Released: 29 March 2024

Jag önskar jag brydde mig mer is the first part of the fifth studio album by Swedish hip-hop group Hov1, released on 10 May 2024 by EMI and Universal. The album charted atop the Swedish Albums Chart and peaked at number four in Norway. The album includes the single "Lilla B", released on 24 March 2023. "Lilla B" peaked at number-one on the Swedish Singles Chart and has been certified 2× Platinum by the Swedish Recording Industry Association. The second single and title track of the album, "Jag önskar jag brydde mig mer", was released on 29 March 2024 and was first featured at the end of the group's concert movie Hov1 forever. "Jag önskar jag brydde mig mer" subsequently peaked at number three on the Swedish Singles Chart. Alike previous album releases by the group, group member Axel Liljefors Jansson handled the album's production while all group members share writing credits on all tracks.

The second part of Hov1's fifth studio album, titled ... men det gör jag egentligen, was released on 30 August 2024.

== Critical reception ==
Professional ratings
Review scores
| Source | Rating |
|---|---|
| Aftonbladet | 3/5 stars |

Per Magnusson of Aftonbladet praised the group's songwriting skills and the beats used on the album, calling them joyful. Magnusson highlighted the track "Ica" as the best track on the album.

== Track listing ==
Jag önskar jag brydde mig mer track listing
| No. | Title | Writer(s) | Producer(s) | Length |
|---|---|---|---|---|
| 1. | "Hej du" | Axel Liljefors Jansson; Dante Lindhe; Ludwig Kronstrand; Noel Flike | Jansson | 3:31 |
| 2. | "Helluva Life" | Jansson; Lindhe; Kronstrand; Flike | Jansson | 3:05 |
| 3. | "Lilla B" | Jansson; Lindhe; Jonas Knutsson; Kronstrand; Flike | Jansson | 2:58 |
| 4. | "Ica" | Jansson; Lindhe; Iain Archer; James Bay; Kronstrand; Flike | Jansson | 2:34 |
| 5. | "Sangenjaya 3am" | Jansson; Lindhe; Kronstrand; Flike | Jansson | 2:59 |
| 6. | "Dig (Ormingevisan)" | Jansson; Lindhe; Kronstrand; Flike | Jansson | 2:26 |
| 7. | "Jag önskar jag brydde mig mer" | Jansson; Lindhe; Kronstrand; Flike | Jansson | 3:19 |
| 8. | "Väck mig när det är över" | Jansson; Lindhe; Kronstrand; Flike | Jansson | 3:29 |
| 9. | "Hundra lax kärlek" | Jansson; Lindhe; Kronstrand; Flike | Jansson | 3:37 |
| 10. | "En sån som mig" | Jansson; Lindhe; Kronstrand; Flike | Jansson; Ian Persson Stiernswärd | 4:02 |
| Total length: | | | | 32:04 |

== Charts ==
=== Weekly charts ===
Weekly chart performance for Jag önskar jag brydde mig mer
| Chart (2024) | Peak position |
|---|---|
| Norwegian Albums (VG-lista) | 4 |
| Swedish Albums (Sverigetopplistan) | 1 |

=== Year-end charts ===
Year-end chart performance for Jag önskar jag brydde mig mer
| Chart | Year | Position |
|---|---|---|
| Swedish Albums (Sverigetopplistan) | 2024 | 8 |
| Swedish Albums (Sverigetopplistan) | 2025 | 11 |

== Release history ==
Release formats for Jag önskar jag brydde mig mer
| Region | Date | Format | Label |
|---|---|---|---|
| Various | 10 May 2024 | Digital download; streaming | EMI; Universal |
