= Trendsetter Media and Marketing =

- Founded: 2008
- Founder: Roy LaManna
- Headquarters: Freehold, NJ
- Website: trendsettermarketing.net

Trendsetter Media and Marketing is a music video promotion and production with offices in both New Jersey and Los Angeles. Founded by Roy LaManna in 2008, Trendsetter has worked with clients such as: Justin Bieber, Big Time Rush, Train, Bo Burnham, MTV, and Coca-Cola. In 2009, the company expanded into management with Cara Salimando.

== Promotion ==
- Tyga (Decaydance Records)
- Butch Walker (One Haven Music)
- Greg Nice (One Haven Music)
- The Young Veins (One Haven Music)
- Toby Mac (EMI)
- Danko Jones (Bad Taste Records)
- Chickenfoot (Redline Entertainment)
- Bo Burnham (Comedy Central Records)
- Scott Weiland (Softdrive Records)
- Attack Attack! (Rise Records)
- The Devil Wears Prada (Rise Records)
- We The Kings (S-Curve Records)
- Duran Duran (S-Curve Records)
- Diane Birch (S-Curve Records)
- Disco Biscuits (Diamond Riggs Records/Red Light Management)
- KEM (Universal Motown)
- Vita Chambers (SRP Records/Universal Motown)
- Cara Salimando (SRP Records/Universal Motown)
- American Bang (Warner Bros. Records)
- NeverShoutNever (Warner Bros. Records)
- Big Head Todd (Big Records)
- Big Time Rush (Columbia Records)
- Train (Columbia Records)
- Lil J and Ed Junior (Bad Money Records)
- Hey Monday (Columbia Records)
- Raphael Saadiq (Columbia Records)
- New Politics (RCA Records)
- Dan Balan (Loop Productions)
- Official Hot Mess (JLK Entertainment)
- Hatebreed (Roadrunner Records)

== Production ==
- Hey Monday "How You Love Me Now" (Columbia Records)
- Boys Like Girls "Heart Heart Heartbreak" (Columbia Records)
- Chrisette Michele feat. Wale "Fragile" (Island Def Jam)
- Jenna Andrews "Tumblin' Down" (Island Def Jam)
- My Darkest Days feat. Ludacris, Chad Kroeger and Zakk Wylde (Island Def Jam)
- Justin Bieber "U Smile" (Island Def Jam)
- Justin Bieber "Pray" (Island Def Jam)
- We The Kings "Secret Valentine" (S-Curve Records)
- We The Kings "Promise The Stars" (S-Curve Records)
- Shontelle "Battle Cry" (Universal Motown)
- Hal Linton "Southern Hospitality" (SRP Records/Universal Motown)
- Cara Salimando "Cigarette Smoke" (SRP Records/Universal Motown)
- Ida Maria feat. Iggy Pop "Oh My God" (Mercury Records)
- Cash Cash "Party In Your Bedroom" (Universal Republic)
- Butch Walker "Here Comes The Heartache"
- Adam Lambert Glam Nation Live DVD
- Jamey Johnson VEVO Summer Set

== Management ==
- Cara Salimando (SRP Records/Universal Motown)
- For The Foxes (Hopeless Records)
