= DJ Trendsetter =

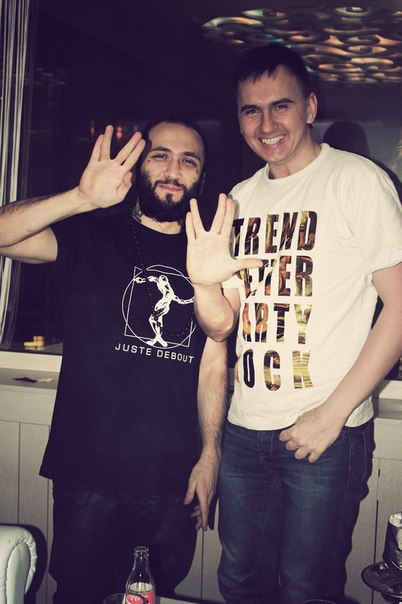

Background information
- Also known as: DJ Trendsetter, Trendsetter
- Born: Mark Holiday; 5 June 1987 (age 39)
- Genres: EDM, house music, Trap, Hip hop, future house, big room house
- Occupations: DJ, record producer, remixer
- Instruments: FL Studio, Pro Tools
- Years active: 2014—present
- Labels: Trap Gold Records, Miami Mainstage.
- Website: www.beatport.com/artist/trendsetter/254995

Mark Holiday (born June 5, 1987), also known by his stage name DJ Trendsetter or Trendsetter, is an EDM and Hip-Hop DJ and record producer, discovered on BBC Radio 1 by Annie Nightingale in 2013, and having his guest mix on BBC Radio 1 in 2014. He received support from artists like Diplo, DJ M.E.G. $ N.E.R.A.K. (MEG & NERAK), Matisse & Sadko, GLOWINTHEDARK, Annie Mac, DJ Bl3nd, and more. Twelve of his tracks and remixes was played on BBC Radio 1, including his remix on Rihanna - Birthday Cake. Although Mark Holiday was well known in Hip-Hop and POP music industry since 2006, producing few major records and remixes for Timati, Dawn Richard, Trina, Toby Love, Mark Morrison, Lumidee, Really Doe and many more. DJ Trendsetter achieved his popularity as EDM producer after his tracks and releases appeared 47 (forty seven) times in TOP-100 sales charts on Beatport., As record producer Mark working mainly with U.S. based artists and labels. His DJ performance set is a mixture of EDM, and Trap music.

== Biography ==
=== 2005–2012: Career beginnings ===
Mark Holiday releases his music on U.S. and Italian based labels since 2005, at the beginning of his career, he was signed to various EDM label's like Fluid Groove Records, Stranamente Recordings, Superbia Recordings, Electrico Records, BomBeatz Music, Mercedez Lane, under his alias "Kelly Holiday". After his first releases in electronic music genres, in the year of 2007 he started producing Hip-Hop and mainstream POP music. Under his alias "Trendsetter" or "Mark Holiday" he produced tracks and remixes for U.S. mainstream POP and Hip-Hop artists like Dawn Richard, Lumidee, Really Doe, Shaka Dee, Trina, and also international artists like Timati, Mark Morrison, Ani Lorak, MC Jin, Fernanda Porto.

=== Future of Trap (2013) ===
In 2013, after Mark Holiday released his Trap music singles "Disco Diva", "Big Room Trap", and "Damn Son, Where'd You Find This?" on label "Trap Gold Records", he got his tracks playing on several major radio stations across the globe, including BBC Radio 1, RTVE, Radio Record, Megapolis FM, and many more . Since then, Trendsetter actively releasing his EDM and Trap tracks on Pop Rox Muzik, System Recordings, Trap Gold Records, Get Futuristic Records. His debut Trap music album appeared in TOP-100 sales chart on Beatport, and was ranked #7 in a few days after the release.

=== #GOLDSWAG, Dark Aesthetics, 33 (2014) ===
In January 2014 Trendsetter announced three albums to be released in 2014. During his notable guest mix on BBC Radio 1, he premieres several singles from his upcoming albums "#GOLDSWAG" and "Dark Aesthetics". Trendsetter also announced on his Facebook that his best selling trap singles will form compilation entitled "33".

=== "Theology", "Legacy", "Vivat, Crescat, Floreat" (2017-present) ===
In 2017 Mark Holiday released most of his music catalog in series of album releases in all download and streaming sites. Current (March 30-th) stats shows that he's music got more than 5 million plays on Spotify, and 35+k subscribers on Shazam.

== Discography ==
=== Albums ===
2007

- From the Underground Hausbeat Bag (Italy).
- Electrocute Stranamente Music (Italy).

2013

- Future of Trap Trap Gold Records (USA).

2014

- ##GOLDSWAG, Dark Aesthetics, 33 (2014) "Trap Gold Records" (USA).
- Dark Aesthetics "Trap Gold Records" (USA).
- 33 "TRAP GOLD Records" (USA).

2017

- Theology Trap Gold Records (USA).
- Legacy Trap Gold Records (USA)
- Vivat, Crescat, Floreat Miami Mainstage (USA)

=== Production credits ===
2011

- Shattered Ice album by Adam Tyler.

2012

- SWAGG - "Baby Be My Girl" by Timati (credits appears in track tags, after bought on iTunes).

2013

- YUP IT'S RED - by "RED" (several tracks on album).

2014

- "Beautiful" - by Lateysha Grace, D Jukes and Sophia May (Official soundtrack of MTV show The Valleys Season 3).
