= Haval (rapper) =

Swedish rapper

- Born: Haval Khalil; 16 May 1995 (age 31); Husby, Stockholm, Sweden
- Genres: Hip hop, gangsta rap
- Occupation: Rapper
- Years active: 2018–present
- Label: Haval Music

Haval Khalil (born 16 May 1995), known mononymously as Haval, is a Swedish rapper. He has released three albums.

== Biography ==
Khalil was born in Husby, northern Stockholm. He is based in Skarpnäck within the municipality of Stockholm. He broke through with his debut album Inloggad in 2020, an album produced by Manny Flaco. Haval and Manny Flaco released a number of joint singles as Haval & Manny Flaco. The songs on the album receiving great viewing on streaming platform depict a difficult street life with weapons and drugs.

In April 2021, Haval was nominated for a Swedish Grammis in the "Newcomer of the Year" category. The nomination caused controversy due to Haval's involvement in gangs and in a criminal case where charges had been brought against him. Eventually, on 14 July 2021, Haval was convicted and sentenced for two and a half years for complicity in the kidnapping and robbery of rapper Einár. The trial was held in Södertörn District Court against various activities of the criminal gang Vårbynätverket.

In 2023, he moved to Romania, settling in Otopeni. In September 2026 he was arrested by the Romanian authorities, being charged with an assassination attempt.

== Discography ==
=== Albums ===
Title	Year	Peak chart positions	
Title	Year	SWE	NOR
Inloggad (with Manny Flaco)	2020	13	—
Inloggad 2 (with Manny Flaco)	2022	1	6
Inloggad 3	2024	3	19

=== Singles ===
Solo

Title	Year	Peak chart positions	Album
Title	Year	SWE	Album
"Kontrollzon"	2020	45	Non-album singles
"Hell"	2020	29	Non-album singles
".357"	2020	19	Non-album singles
"Animal"	2021	22	Non-album singles
"Kingston"	2021	10	Non-album singles
"Joker"	2021	16	Non-album singles
"Åskan"	2021	34	Non-album singles
"Kalash"	2022	14	Non-album singles
"Lojalitet"	2023	18	Non-album singles
"Sicarios"	2023	30	Non-album singles
"Southside"	2023	9	Non-album singles
"Paris"	2023	33	Non-album singles
"Zombie" (with Yasin)	2023	12	Non-album singles
"Faller"	2024	62	Non-album singles
"Kandahar" (featuring Manny Flaco)	2024	85	Non-album singles
"Minnen"	2024	52	Inloggad 3
"Paranoid"	2024	— (Note: "Paranoid" did not enter the Swedish Singellista Chart, but peaked at number four on the Swedish Heatseeker Chart.)	Inloggad 3
"Drip"	2024	72	Non-album singles
"Vinnare"	2025	31	Non-album singles
"Mama"	2025	64	Non-album singles
"Amsterdam"	2025	62	Non-album singles
"Santorini"	2025	— (Note: "Santorini" did not enter the Swedish Singellista Chart, but peaked at number two on the Swedish Heatseeker Chart.)	Non-album singles

As Haval & Manny Flaco

Title	Year	Peak chart positions	Album
Title	Year	SWE	Album
"Vice"	2020	24	Non-album singles
"Hayati"	2020	35	Non-album singles
"Gang Gang"	2021	23	Non-album singles
"Dansa till misär"	2021	23	Non-album singles
"Bandol"	2022	8	Inloggad 2
"Toùtoù"	2022	16	Non-album single

=== Featured in ===
Title	Year	Peak chart positions	Album
Title	Year	SWE	Album
"Lagen" (Macky feat. Thrife, Haval, Abidaz)	2018	90	Genom alla väder
"Försök andas" (Viktor Ax feat. Haval, Malinn)	2019	–	Epilepsi
"Vinterdepress 2" (Macky feat. Dree Low, Thrife, Haval)	2020	–	
"Hell Ye" (Abidaz feat. Einár, Haval)	2020	–	
"C'est la vie" (Macky feat. Haval)	2020	58	Timeline
"G For Life" (Adel feat. Haval)	2020	–	Guld utav sand

=== Other charted songs ===
Title	Year	Peak chart positions	Album
Title	Year	SWE	Album
"Elden" (with Manny Flaco)	2022	47	Inloggad 2
"Funktown" (with Manny Flaco)	2022	27	Inloggad 2
"Natten" (with Macky and Manny Flaco)	2022	36	Inloggad 2
"Maria" (with Yasin and Manny Flaco)	2022	7	Inloggad 2
"Forever" (with Manny Flaco)	2022	39	Inloggad 2
"Paket" (with Rami and Manny Flaco)	2022	22	Inloggad 2
"War" (with Dizzy and Manny Flaco)	2022	26	Inloggad 2
"Tjuvens lag" (with Manny Flaco)	2022	26	Inloggad 2
"Fly" (with Manny Flaco)	2022	86	Inloggad 2
"Av med oss"	2024	50	Inloggad 3
"Baby"	2024	31	Inloggad 3
"Marley"	2024	59	Inloggad 3
"My Love"	2024	— (Note: "My Love" did not enter the Swedish Singellista Chart, but peaked at number six on the Swedish Heatseeker Chart.)	Inloggad 3
"Trafficante"	2024	— (Note: "Trafficante" did not enter the Swedish Singellista Chart, but peaked at number two on the Swedish Heatseeker Chart.)	Inloggad 3
"Hero"	2024	— (Note: "Hero" did not enter the Swedish Singellista Chart, but peaked at number three on the Swedish Heatseeker Chart.)	Inloggad 3
