= Hov1 =

Swedish hip hop group

- Origin: Sweden
- Genres: Hip hop, pop, hip-pop
- Years active: 2015–2025
- Label: EMI Sweden / Universal Music Sweden
- Past members: Noel Flike; Axel Liljefors Jansson; Ludwig Kronstrand; Dante Lindhe
- Website: hov1.se

Hov1 (pronounced Hovet) were a Swedish hip hop group formed in 2015. The group released seven studio albums, all of which reached the summit of the Swedish Albums Chart. They also amassed a total of 42 top 10 hits on the Swedish Singles Chart, with 16 of them reaching the top spot. Across their career, Hov1 consistently ranked among the most streamed artists in Sweden.

In 2025, Hov1 announced their disbandment after 10 years, following a farewell tour in July and August of that year.

== History ==
=== 2015–2018: First releases and projects ===
Made up of Ludwig Kronstrand, Noel Flike, Dante Lindhe and Axel Liljefors Jansson, Hov1's debut hit single was "Hur kan du säga saker", which was released in 2015. They released their self-titled debut album Hov1 in April 2017, promoting it with the "Abbey Road Tour". The follow-up album was Gudarna på Västerbron, released in April 2018. Both albums have topped the Swedish Albums Chart.

=== 2019–2025: Releases through disbandment ===
On 17 May 2019, the band released their third studio album, Vindar på Mars. Furthermore, on 10 January 2020, Hov1 released their fourth studio album (also described as a mixtape), called Montague. Both of these releases debuted at number one the Swedish Albums Chart. They also charted on the Finnish Albums Chart, peaking at number 25 and 40, respectively.

Between 2021 and 2025, they released an additional four albums, all of which reached the top position on the Swedish Albums Chart. Barn av vår tid was released in 2021, followed by both Jag önskar jag brydde mig mer and ...Men det gör jag egentligen in 2024, and finally Förr nu & forever in 2025. In February 2025, Hov1 announced that they would disband after ten years, followed by a farewell tour of Sweden that summer titled "Vi dansar vidare i livet". Förr nu & forever, their final album, was released on 29 August 2025, the day of their last concert, held at Gärdet in Stockholm.

== Awards ==
Hov1 has received several awards during its career. The group received three Rockbjörnen awards in 2018, as well as in 2019. The awards were, for instance, "Live-group of the year", "Best fans of the year" and "Concert of the year". The group also received three awards in the "P3 Guld gala" in 2019; "Group of the year", "Guldmicken" and "Best song of the year", the latter with the song "Hon dansar vidare i livet".

== Members ==
=== Dante Lindhe ===
Dante Sebastian Lindhe was born on 10 January 1996 in Stockholm. He is a Swedish musician and model. Besides membership in Hov1, Lindhe collaborated with Yasin on the 2020 track "Canada Goose". Since 2019, Lindhe has modelled for Select Model Stockholm.

=== Ludwig Kronstrand ===
He was born on 29 June 1997. He previously dated singer Zara Larsson, a high school friend. She wrote the song "Never Forget You" about him. The two parted when Larsson moved to the States in 2014.

=== Axel Liljefors Jansson ===
He was born on 29 August 1997. He uses the name "Jiggy" in the band. He is the band's producer.

=== Noel Flike ===
Rapper Noel Flike was born on 13 May 1997 in Stockholm. Besides his membership in Hov1, he has worked with singer Zara Larsson on her podcast in 2015 and 2016.

== Discography ==
=== Albums ===
| Album | Year | Peak positions | | | Certifications |
| Album | Year | SWE | NOR | FIN | Certifications |
|---|---|---|---|---|---|
| Hov1 | 2017 | 1 | — | — | GLF: 5× Platinum |
| Gudarna på Västerbron | 2018 | 1 | — | — | GLF: 7× Platinum |
| Vindar på Mars | 2019 | 1 | — | 25 | GLF: 5× Platinum |
| Montague | 2020 | 1 | — | 40 | GLF: 2× Platinum |
| Barn av vår tid | 2021 | 1 | 17 | — | GLF: 4× Platinum |
| Jag önskar jag brydde mig mer | 2024 | 1 | 4 | — | |
| ...Men det gör jag egentligen | 2024 | 1 | 9 | — | |
| Förr nu & forever | 2025 | 1 | 9 | — | |

=== Singles ===
| Title | Year | Peak positions | | Certifications | Album |
| Title | Year | SWE | NOR | Certifications | Album |
|---|---|---|---|---|---|
| "Hur kan du säga saker" | 2015 | 66 | — | | Non-album singles |
| "Kärleksbrev" | 2016 | 56 | — | GLF: 4× Platinum | Non-album singles |
| "Ska vi?" | 2016 | 88 | — | GLF: Platinum | Non-album singles |
| "Hjärtslag" | 2016 | 14 | — | GLF: 2× Platinum | Hov1 |
| "Gråzon" | 2017 | 9 | — | GLF: 4× Platinum | Hov1 |
| "Gift" | 2017 | 4 | — | GLF: 4× Platinum | Hov1 |
| "Pari" (featuring Jireel) | 2017 | 1 | — | GLF: 5× Platinum | Gudarna på Västerbron |
| "Heartbreak" | 2018 | 5 | — | GLF: Platinum | Gudarna på Västerbron |
| "Gudarna på Västerbron" | 2018 | 2 | — | GLF: 2× Platinum | Gudarna på Västerbron |
| "Hon dansar vidare i livet" | 2018 | 1 | — | GLF: 10× Platinum | Gudarna på Västerbron |
| "Still" | 2018 | 1 | — | GLF: 4× Platinum | Spotify Singles |
| "Hon dansar vidare i livet Pt. 2" | 2018 | 12 | — | GLF: Platinum | Spotify Singles |
| "Auf wiedersehen" | 2018 | 1 | — | GLF: 3× Platinum | Gudarna på Västerbron |
| "Vindar på Mars" | 2019 | 1 | — | GLF: 4× Platinum | Vindar på Mars |
| "Dö ung" | 2019 | 4 | — | GLF: 4× Platinum | Vindar på Mars |
| "Ma chérie" | 2019 | 4 | — | GLF: 2× Platinum | Vindar på Mars |
| "Mitten av september" | 2020 | 1 | — | GLF: 3× Platinum | Montague |
| "När jag ser dig" | 2020 | 1 | — | GLF: 4× Platinum | Non-album singles |
| "Långt bort härifrån" | 2020 | 1 | — | GLF: 3× Platinum | Non-album singles |
| "Barn av vår tid" | 2021 | 1 | — | GLF: 5× Platinum | Barn av vår tid |
| "Gamora" (featuring Einár) | 2021 | 1 | — | GLF: 7× Platinum | Barn av vår tid |
| "Tokken" (featuring Dree Low) | 2021 | 1 | — | GLF: 3× Platinum | Barn av vår tid |
| "Blå" | 2021 | 1 | — | GLF: 3× Platinum | Non-album singles |
| "Flickorna i Båstad" | 2021 | 1 | — | GLF: Platinum | Non-album singles |
| "Hit the Club" | 2021 | 2 | — | GLF: Platinum | Barn av vår tid |
| "Räkna dagar" | 2021 | 1 | — | GLF: 2× Platinum | Barn av vår tid |
| "30 personer" (with Elias Hurtig) | 2022 | 1 | — | | Non-album singles |
| "Två steg från helvetet" | 2022 | 1 | — | GLF: Platinum | Non-album singles |
| "Alla våra minnen" | 2022 | 2 | — | GLF: Platinum | Non-album singles |
| "Free Smoke" | 2022 | 3 | — | GLF: Platinum | Non-album singles |
| "Nåt i vattnet" | 2022 | 1 | — | GLF: Platinum | Non-album singles |
| "Lilla B" | 2023 | 1 | — | GLF: 2× Platinum | Jag önskar jag brydde mig mer |
| "Grät" | 2023 | 1 | — | GLF: 2× Platinum | ...Men det gör jag egentligen |
| "Vibe Check" | 2023 | 1 | — | GLF: Gold | Non-album singles |
| "Saudade" (with Håkan Hellström) | 2023 | 1 | — | GLF: Gold | Non-album singles |
| "När lyktorna tänds" | 2023 | 2 | — | | Non-album singles |
| "30 Under 30" | 2024 | 2 | — | | Non-album singles |
| "Jag önskar jag brydde mig mer" | 2024 | 3 | — | | Jag önskar jag brydde mig mer |
| "Helluva Life" | 2024 | 4 | — | | Jag önskar jag brydde mig mer |
| "Försent" (with Seinabo Sey) | 2024 | 2 | — | | ...Men det gör jag egentligen |
| "Tårarnas spår" | 2024 | 2 | — | | ...Men det gör jag egentligen |
| "Räddare i nöden" | 2025 | 2 | 86 | | Förr nu & forever |
| "Suddiga tankar" | 2025 | 5 | — | | Förr nu & forever |
| "2CB" | 2025 | 6 | — | | Förr nu & forever |

=== Other charted songs ===
| Song | Year | Peak positions | Certifications | Album |
| Song | Year | SWE | Certifications | Album |
|---|---|---|---|---|
| "Mandy Moore" | 2017 | 11 | GLF: 6× Platinum | Hov1 |
| "Hov1" | 2017 | 25 | GLF: Platinum | Hov1 |
| "Damn" | 2017 | 29 | GLF: Platinum | Hov1 |
| "Sex" | 2017 | 31 | GLF: Platinum | Hov1 |
| "Channel Orange" | 2017 | 32 | GLF: Platinum | Hov1 |
| "Runaway Bride" | 2017 | 40 | GLF: Platinum | Hov1 |
| "Redo" | 2018 | 5 | GLF: Platinum | Gudarna på Västerbron |
| "Förlåt" | 2018 | 12 | GLF: Platinum | Gudarna på Västerbron |
| "OMG" | 2018 | 12 | GLF: Platinum | Gudarna på Västerbron |
| "Vill inte ha dig" | 2018 | 13 | GLF: Platinum | Gudarna på Västerbron |
| "Stan e mörk" | 2018 | 23 | GLF: Platinum | Gudarna på Västerbron |
| "Född i juni" | 2018 | 21 | GLF: Gold | Gudarna på Västerbron |
| "Din mamma" | 2018 | 26 | GLF: Gold | Gudarna på Västerbron |
| "Hornstullsstrand" (with Veronica Maggio) | 2019 | 1 | GLF: 6× Platinum | Vindar på Mars |
| "Neon" | 2019 | 6 | GLF: 3× Platinum | Vindar på Mars |
| "Smokebreak" | 2019 | 8 | GLF: Platinum | Vindar på Mars |
| "Ensammast i världen" | 2019 | 11 | GLF: Platinum | Vindar på Mars |
| "Älskling" | 2019 | 13 | GLF: Platinum | Vindar på Mars |
| "Fri" | 2019 | 15 | GLF: Platinum | Vindar på Mars |
| "Svartsjuk" | 2020 | 4 | GLF: Platinum | Montague |
| "Våra vackra dar" | 2020 | 2 | GLF: 2× Platinum | Montague |
| "Kära mamma" | 2020 | 5 | GLF: Platinum | Montague |
| "Två sekunder på loftet" | 2020 | 7 | GLF: Platinum | Montague |
| "Brev ifrån en storstad" | 2020 | 10 | GLF: Gold | Montague |
| "I Love U So Much" | 2020 | 12 | GLF: Gold | Montague |
| "Sex i taxin" | 2020 | 11 | | Montague |
| "Tjuvheder" | 2021 | 13 | GLF: Platinum | Barn av vår tid |
| "458" | 2021 | 14 | GLF: Gold | Barn av vår tid |
| "Banksy" | 2021 | 25 | GLF: Gold | Barn av vår tid |
| "Hur mycket? (Pengar vill du ha)" (featuring Einár) | 2021 | 5 | GLF: 2× Platinum | Barn av vår tid |
| "365" | 2021 | 28 | GLF: Gold | Barn av vår tid |
| "Raindance" | 2021 | 43 | | Barn av vår tid |
| "Frankfurt" | 2021 | 35 | GLF: Gold | Barn av vår tid |
| "Certified" | 2021 | 37 | GLF: Gold | Barn av vår tid |
| "Rigatoni" | 2021 | 44 | GLF: Gold | Barn av vår tid |
| "Hej du" | 2024 | 18 | | Jag önskar jag brydde mig mer |
| "Ica" | 2024 | 30 | | Jag önskar jag brydde mig mer |
| "Sangenjaya 3am" | 2024 | 29 | | Jag önskar jag brydde mig mer |
| "Dig (Ormingevisan)" | 2024 | 32 | | Jag önskar jag brydde mig mer |
| "Väck mig när det är över" | 2024 | 41 | | Jag önskar jag brydde mig mer |
| "Hundra lax kärlek" | 2024 | 48 | | Jag önskar jag brydde mig mer |
| "En sån som mig" | 2024 | 46 | | Jag önskar jag brydde mig mer |
| "Darkness & demoner" | 2024 | 17 | | ...Men det gör jag egentligen |
| "Vem är jag utan dig" | 2024 | 10 | | ...Men det gör jag egentligen |
| "Känslokall" | 2024 | 21 | | ...Men det gör jag egentligen |
| "Senaste tiden" | 2024 | 9 | | ...Men det gör jag egentligen |
| "En Stockholmshistoria" | 2024 | 47 | | ...Men det gör jag egentligen |
| "En syndares horisont" | 2024 | 54 | | ...Men det gör jag egentligen |
| "Kalorier & kokain" | 2024 | 50 | | ...Men det gör jag egentligen |
| "Förr nu & forever" | 2025 | 1 | | Förr nu & forever |
| "Glycerin (Merediths visa)" | 2025 | 4 | | Förr nu & forever |
| "Novemberregn" | 2025 | 5 | | Förr nu & forever |
| "Den bästa som du haft" | 2025 | 7 | | Förr nu & forever |
| "Ozempic" | 2025 | 9 | | Förr nu & forever |
