= Kapten Röd =

Swedish artist and music producer

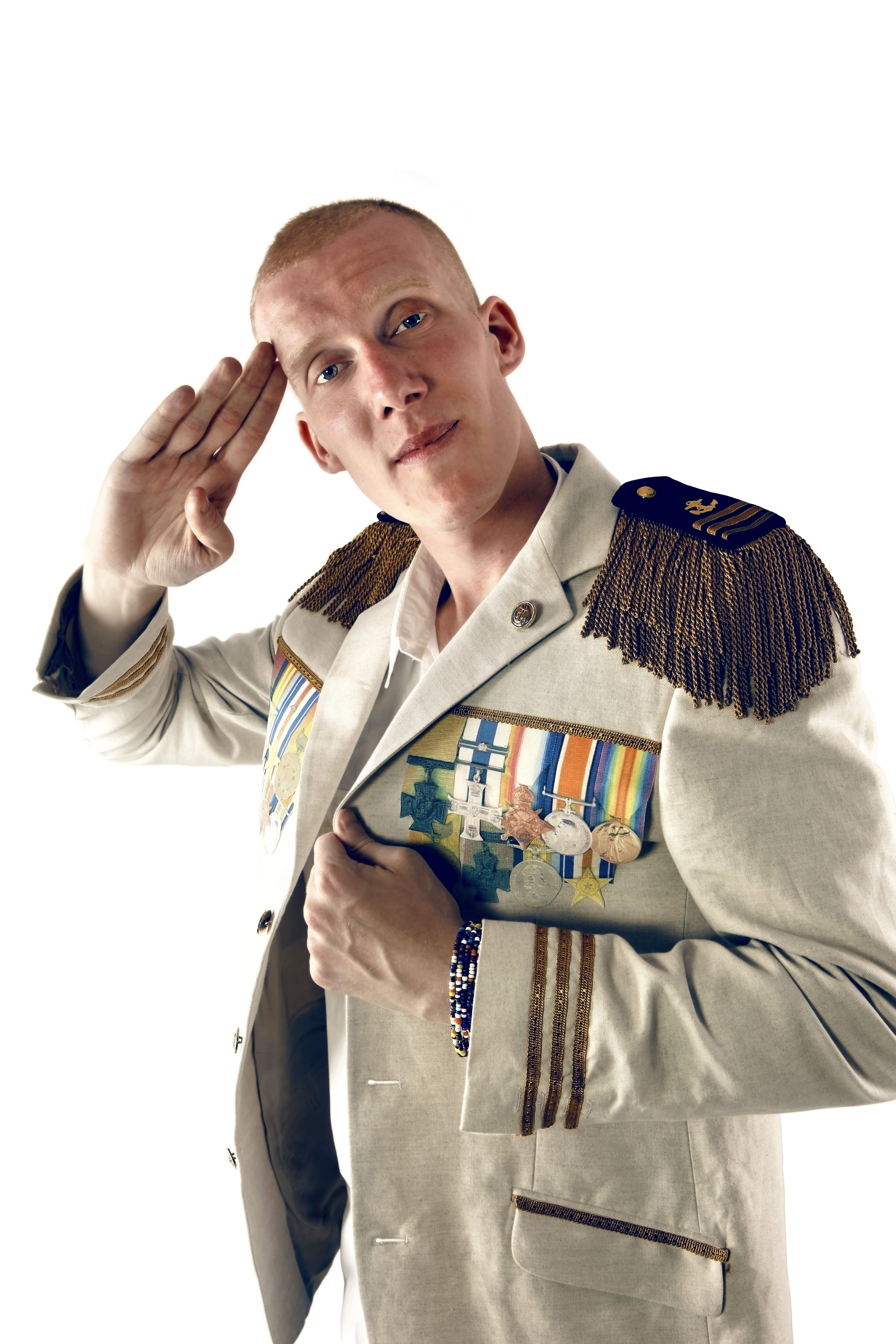
- Kapten Röd, 2012

Background information
- Also known as: Kapten, Frenemy
- Born: Björn Axel Tage Nilsson; 7 July 1983 (age 42); Gothenburg, Västergötland, Sweden
- Genres: Reggae, Dancehall
- Occupations: Singer, songwriter, record producer, musician
- Years active: 2007 – present
- Label: SwingKids
- Website: kaptenrod.se Official website

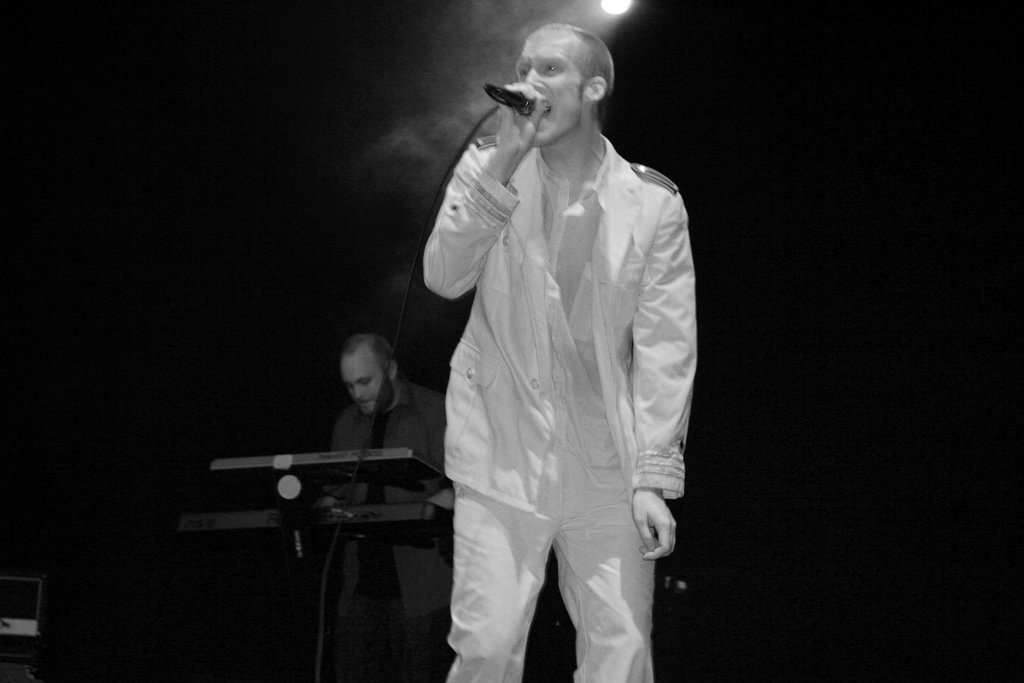
Kapten Röd live

Björn Nilsson (born 7 July 1983), better known by his stage name Kapten Röd, is a Swedish dancehall/ragga artist and music producer from Gothenburg, Sweden.

He initially released the single "Visa ingen nåd"/"En storm är på väg" in the formation Kungariket with Tommy Tip. Kungariket was often joined by band Majorerna. In 2007, he produced Stjärnorna finns här, the debut album for General Knas and Calle P. Kapten Röd. He promoted the album through taking part in a number of festivals and club gigs. In autumn 2007 he toured as Kapten Röd (literally Captain Red), with backing band Majorerna, on a tour with the Svenska Akademien. In 2008, he was also part of Kingsfarm Guerilla under the alias Frenemy. He also produced for other artists like Roffe Ruff, Million Stylez, The Serengeti, Promoe, Ziggi and Papa Dee. He released the single "En miljon nollor" ( literally meaning "one million zeros", but also means "one million losers") at the end of 2010 and the album Fläcken som aldrig går bort on 6 July 2011. He is considered a leading name in the reggae scene in Gothenburg.

== Discography ==
=== Albums ===
- 2007: Stjärnorna finns här
- 2011: Fläcken som aldrig går bort

Compilation album

- 2007: Du ska inte tro det blir sommar

=== Singles ===
Year	Title	Peak	Certification	Album
Year	Title	SWE	Certification	Album
2010	"En miljon nollor"	—		
2011	"Saknade vänner"	33		Fläcken som aldrig går bort
2011	"Ju mer dom spottar"	5		Fläcken som aldrig går bort
2017	"Över min döda"	73		
2017	"Rudeboy Love"	83		
2018	"Ögon rinner ner"	— (Note: "Ögon rinner ner" did not enter the Swedish Singellista Chart, but peaked at number 15 on the Swedish Heatseeker Chart.)		
2026	"Eld fire fogo" (with Håkan Hellström and Jaqee)	84		

Featured in

Year	Song	Peak	Certification	Album
Year	Song	SWE	Certification	Album
2012	"När solen går ner" (Aki feat. Kapten Röd)	1	3× Platinum	
