= Valsta =

Suburb in Stockholm County, Sweden

Valsta is a suburban area in the vicinity of Märsta, north of Stockholm, Sweden.
