= Einár =

Swedish rapper (2002–2021)

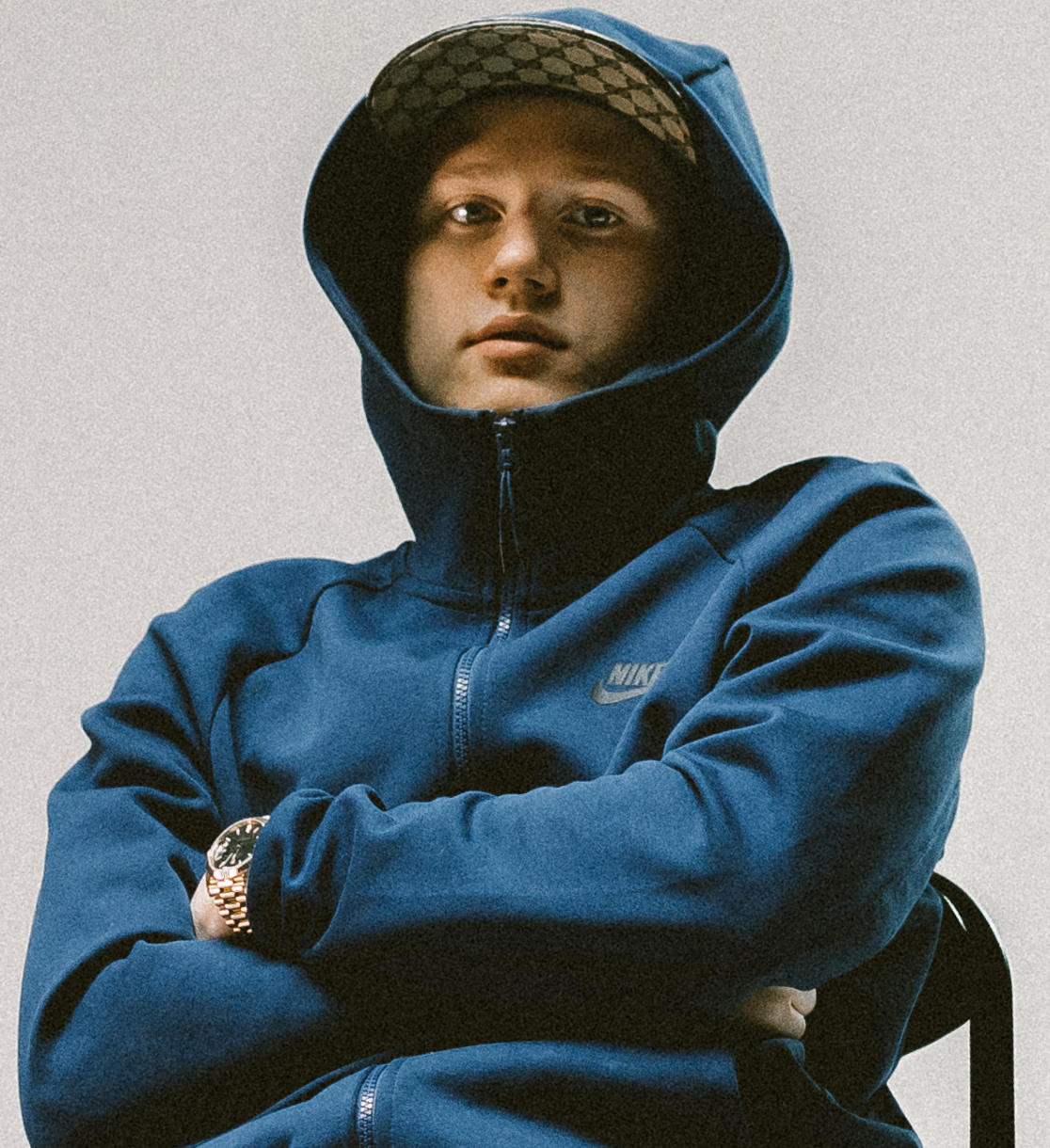
- Einár in 2020
- Born: Nils Kurt Einar Grönberg; 5 September 2002; Stockholm, Sweden
- Died: 21 October 2021 (aged 19); Stockholm, Sweden
- Occupation: Rapper
- Years active: 2018–2021
- Mother: Lena Nilsson
- Musical career
- Genres: Hip-hop; Gangsta rap
- Label: NS1

Nils Kurt Erik Einar Grönberg (Swedish: [nɪls kʉrt eːrɪk ɛjnar]) (5 September 2002 – 21 October 2021), who was commonly known as Einár ([ɛjnar] or [ɛjnaːr]) was a Swedish rapper. He released four albums, two of which topped the Swedish album chart. In 2019, he won the Musikförläggarnas pris for Breakthrough of the Year and in 2020 he won two Grammis, Sweden's oldest pop music awards. Two of his singles peaked at number one on the Swedish singles chart and four have been certified platinum by the Swedish Recording Industry Association (SRIA). He is also featured on the number-one single "Gamora" by the group Hov1.

Einár was involved in several high-profile incidents, most notably his kidnapping by rival rapper Yasin and a Vårby-based criminal gang in 2020. A week before he was scheduled to testify in a trial connected to his kidnapping, he was shot dead in what police described as an execution-style shooting.

== Early life and career ==
Einár was born on 5 September 2002 to the actress Lena Nilsson. He grew up in Enskededalen. At the age of 17, Einár was arrested under the Swedish equivalent of Chapter 403 in Title 18 (US) or Anti-social behaviour order (UK), Lag med särskilda bestämmelser om vård av unga (LVU). He lived for several months in a locked child protection home.

Einár's first solo single "Gucci / Duckar Popo" was streamed on Spotify over one million times. His second single "Katten i trakten" peaked at number one on the Swedish Singles Chart in February 2019. His follow-up single "Rör mig" entered the Sverigetopplistan chart at number three in its first week of release in May 2019. Einár released the studio albums Första klass, Nummer 1 and Welcome to Sweden; The first two albums were released in 2019 and the third on 15 May 2020. Welcome to Sweden debuted and peaked at number two on the Swedish Albums Chart. Första klass and Nummer 1 peaked at number one.

Einár won the Musikförläggarnas pris in 2019 in the Breakthrough of the Year category. At Sveriges Radio's P3 Guld gala in 2020, which was broadcast on SVT, he won in the Song of the Year category for the song "Katten i trakten". At the 2020 Grammis awards, Einár won the awards for Newcomer of the Year and Hiphop of the Year.

== Criminal activity ==
Einár was convicted for minor narcotics crime, assault and driving without a permit. In October 2021, he was arrested after a stabbing. He also socialised with known criminals.

== Kidnapping ==
In April 2020, Einár was kidnapped in a plot that was instigated by rival rapper Yasin and perpetrated by other members of the criminal gang called Vårbynätverket ("Vårby network"). He was held at gunpoint for several hours and his kidnappers took photographs of him and posted them on social media. They also stole a Rolex watch worth 302,000 kr (US$35,100) and two gold chains worth a total of 163,000 kr (US$19,000).

Yasin was later sentenced to ten months in prison for the kidnapping. Another rapper, Haval Khalil—known as Haval)—was sentenced to 2 1/2 years for complicity in the kidnapping and robbery. The crime and subsequent trials of the perpetrators received international attention. Einár was living under death threats after his kidnapping and was using a protected identity.

== Death and subsequent events ==
Murder of Einár
- Date: 21 October 2021
- Time: 22:50 (CEST)
- Location: Hammarby Sjöstad, Stockholm, Sweden
- Type: Shooting (execution)
- Motive: Suspected gang-related retaliation
- Participants: Two suspected gunmen
- Burial: Katarina kyrkogård, Stockholm, 19 November 2021
- Arrests: None
- Einár was scheduled to testify in a trial related to his 2020 kidnapping the week after his murder.

Einár was shot dead on the evening of 21 October 2021 in Hammarby Sjöstad, Stockholm. Police described his killing as an execution because he was shot from a distance of 1.5 metres (4.9 ft). The shooting was part of a trend of rising gun violence in Sweden that began in the 2010s.

Einár had been scheduled to testify against Vårbynätverket crime gang and Yasin in the Svea Court of Appeal the week after his killing. He had previously refused to testify and was very public about the fact that he would not participate. The Swedish Police launched a murder investigation, but no arrests have been made.

On the morning after his death, Swedish Prime Minister Stefan Löfven and Minister for Culture Amanda Lind sent their condolences to Einár's family and fans.

== Funeral ==
Einár's funeral took place on 19 November 2021, at the Katarina Church in Stockholm. He was buried in Katarina kyrkogård, the cemetery on the Church's grounds.

== Discography ==
- Första klass (2019)
- Nummer 1 (2019)
- Welcome to Sweden (2020)
- Unge med extra energi (2020)

== See also ==
- List of murdered hip hop musicians
- Gun violence in Sweden
