= Lena 20 år =

2007 Lena Philipsson compilation album

Compilation album by Lena Philipsson
- Released: January 24, 2007
- Recorded: 1986–2007
- Genre: Pop
- Label: Columbia

Lena Philipsson chronology
Lady Star (2006)	Lena 20 år (2007)	Dubbel (2008)

Lena 20 år is a compilation album released on 24 January 2007 from the Swedish pop singer Lena Philipsson. It peaked at number two on the Swedish Albums Chart.

== Track listing ==
1. "Kärleken är evig" – 3:07
2. "Han jobbar i affär" – 3:48
3. "Det gör ont" – 3:01
4. "Dansa i neon" – 3:21
5. "Lena Anthem" – 4:12
6. "Om igen" – 3:04
7. "Åh Amadeus" – 3:31
8. "Stjärnorna" – 3:54
9. "Why (så lätt kommer du inte undan)" – 4:59
10. "Jag känner" – 4:06
11. "På gatan där jag bor" – 4:10
12. "Standing in My Rain" – 4:43
13. "Bästa vänner" – 3:18
14. "Delirium" – 4:22
15. "Talking in Your Sleep" – 4:41
16. "Unga pojkar & äldre män" – 4:31
17. "006" – 4:23
18. "Månsken i augusti" – 4:21
19. "Jag måste skynda mig på" – 4:00 (duet Lena Philipsson-Orup)

== Charts ==
Chart (2007)	Peak position
Sweden (Sverigetopplistan)	2
