= 100% Lena =

Greatest hits album by Lena Philipsson
- Released: 2002
- Recorded: 1986–?
- Genre: Pop
- Label: Mriann

Lena Philipsson chronology
Lena Philipsson Collection 1984-2001 (2001)	100% Lena (2002)	Det gör ont en stund på natten men inget på dan (2004)

100% Lena was released in 2002 and is a compilation album by Swedish pop singer Lena Philipsson.

== Track listing ==
1. "Kärleken är evig"
2. "Om igen"
3. "Saknar dig innan du går"
4. "Jag känner"
5. "Det går väl an"
6. "Cheerio"
7. "Åh Amadeus"
8. "Månsken i augusti"
9. "Dansa i neon"
10. "Du är mitt liv"
11. "Stjärnorna"
12. "Löpa linan ut"
13. "Den ende"
14. "Åh, vad jag längtar"
15. "Sommartid"
16. "Om jag fick"
17. "Kom du av dej"
18. "Säg det nu"
19. "Segla"
20. "Boy"
