= Lena Philipsson Collection =

Compilation album by Lena Philipsson
- Released: 13 April 2001
- Recorded: 1984–2001
- Genre: Pop
- Label: Musikverkstan

Lena Philipsson chronology
Hennes bästa (1998)	Lena Philipsson Collection (2001)	100% Lena (2002)

Lena Philipsson Collection, is a 2001 compilation album by Swedish pop singer Lena Philipsson. It peaked at #13 at the Swedish album chart.

== Track listing ==
1. "Fly Me Over the Rainbow"
2. "Boy"
3. "Kärleken är evig"
4. "Åh Amadeus"
5. "Jag känner (Ti sento)"
6. "Dansa i neon"
7. "Det går väl an"
8. "Saknar dig innan du går"
9. "Om igen"
10. "Talking in Your Sleep"
11. "I'm a Fool"
12. "Jag kan jag vill"
13. "Tänd ett ljus"
14. "Teach Me Tiger"
15. "Standing in My Rain"
16. "Why (Så lätt kommer du inte undan)"
17. "My Name"
18. "Taking-Care Day"
19. "006"
20. "Macho Male"
21. "The Murder"
22. "The Preacher"
23. "Give Me Your Love"
24. "Månsken i augusti"
25. "Stjärnorna"
26. "Kärlek kommer med sommar"
27. "Vila hos mig"
28. "Bästa vänner"
29. "I Believe in Miracles"

== Chart positions ==
Chart (2001)	Peak position
Sweden	13
