= Lena Anthem =

2004 single by Lena Philipsson

Single by Lena Philipsson

from the album Det gör ont en stund på natten men inget på dan
- Released: 11 October 2004
- Genre: Disco
- Length: 3:56 (radio edit); 4:13 (album version)
- Label: Columbia; Sony Music
- Songwriters: Orup; Tim Norell
- Producer: Anders Hansson

Lena Philipsson singles chronology
"Delirium" (2004)	"Lena Anthem" (2004)	"På gatan där jag bor" (2005)

"Lena Anthem" is a song by Swedish singer Lena Philipsson from her ninth studio album Det gör ont en stund på natten men inget på dan (2004). It was released as the album's third single on 11 October 2004 through Columbia and Sony Music. Written by Thomas "Orup" Eriksson and produced by Anders Hansson, "Lena Anthem" is a disco song with synthesizer instrumentation and interpolations of Philipsson's 1987 single "Dansa i neon". Lyrically, the song contains exaggerated and tongue-in-cheek statements that proclaim her greater than her rivals.

The song was met with generally positive reviews in the Swedish press; several music critics praised its overconfident and humorous lyrics. "Lena Anthem" was Philipsson's fourth consecutive top-five entry of 2004 on the Sverigetopplistan singles chart, peaking at number four. The song also attained top-ten positions on the Svensktoppen and Trackslistan charts. The song was ranked at number 34 on the 2004 year-end chart of Sverigetopplistan. In 2011, Philipsson performed a live rendition of "Lena Anthem" with E-Type on Så mycket bättre.

== Background ==
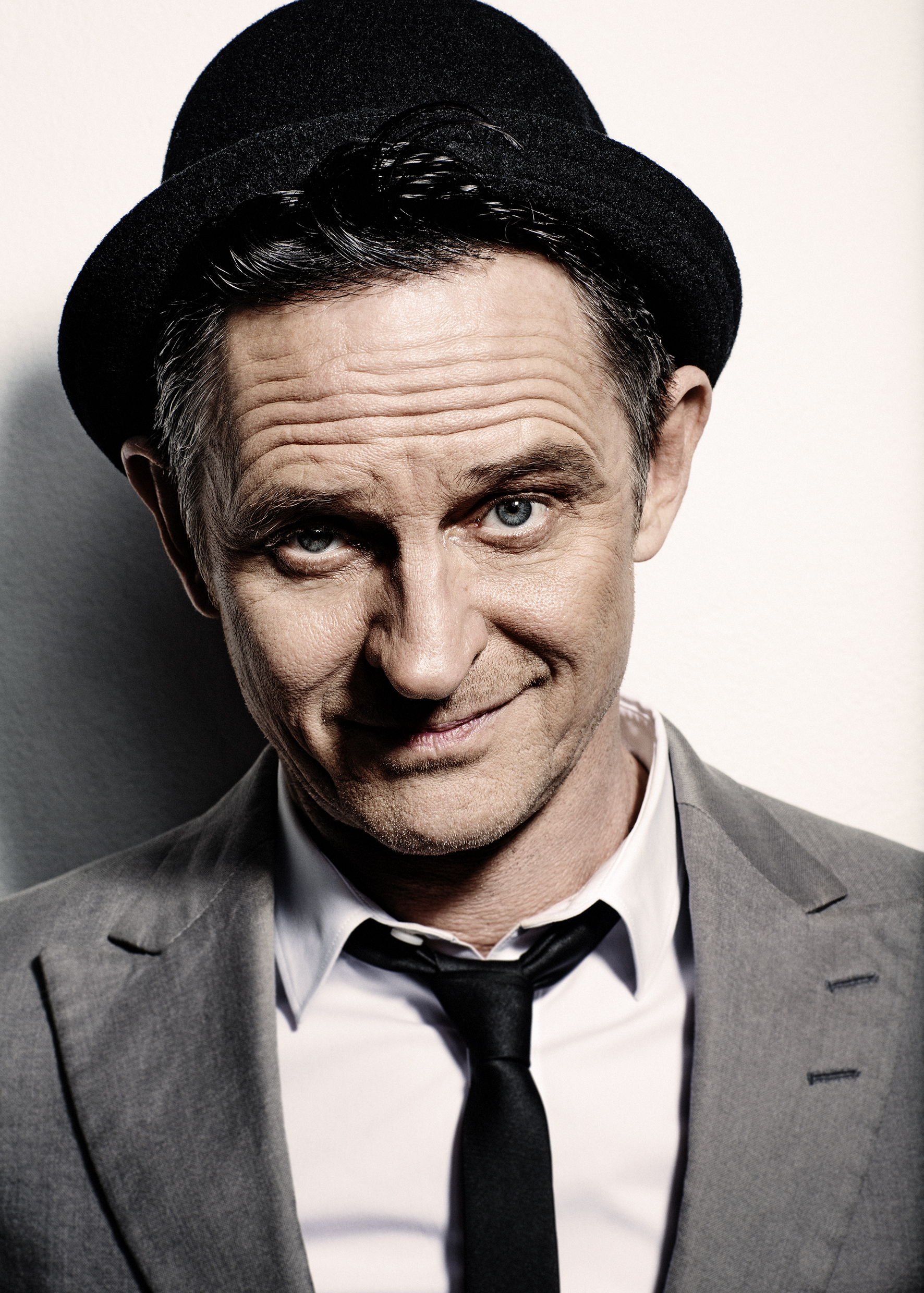
Orup wrote the music and lyrics for "Lena Anthem".

"Lena Anthem" was written by Thomas "Orup" Eriksson for Lena Philipsson's studio album Det gör ont en stund på natten men inget på dan (2004). Philipsson enlisted Orup to write the entirety of the album's music and lyrics. The two started working on the record after she won Melodifestivalen 2004 with "Det gör ont", which advanced her to the Eurovision Song Contest 2004 in Istanbul, Turkey, where she finished fifth in the final. Philipsson described the album as a party record for a girls' night out. Orup wrote the album quickly; Philipsson commented that she barely met with him after he began the writing process. The lyrics mainly focused on relationships she believed listeners could relate to. "Lena Anthem" was different in that aspect as Orup wrote it solely from her point of view. She described it as "special" compared to other album tracks, and stated that its lyrics are exaggerated, "Everything is not really true, but that was his inspiration about me. I think it's great to have a song where I sing about myself."

Anders Hansson produced "Lena Anthem" and handled its recording. The track was mixed by Ronny Lahti and mastered by Björn Engelmann. Philipsson deemed the song one of her favorites on Det gör ont en stund på natten men inget på dan, and Orup selected writing the song as his musical highlight of 2004. In an interview for TT News Agency in August 2004, Philipsson revealed that "Lena Anthem" was a contender for the album's third single, although it had not been decided yet. A few days later, a post on her official website confirmed its single release slated for October 2004. The single was released on 11 October 2004 through Columbia and Sony Music as a CD single. The single artwork was photographed by Jonas Linell and designed by Karl-Magnus Boske. The release contained the song's radio edit and original album version, in addition to a remix of the previous single "Delirium". The single also included a "Lena Anthem" polyphonic ringtone. The song appears on Philipsson's compilation album Lena 20 år (2007).

== Composition and lyrics ==
"Lena Anthem"
A sample of "Lena Anthem", showcasing its tongue-in-cheek chorus where Philipsson asserts that she is "no ordinary Söderberg or Eriksson".

Musically, "Lena Anthem" is a disco song. Parts of the production sample Philipsson's Melodifestivalen 1987 entry "Dansa i neon", for which Tim Norell received music credit. Instrumentation is provided by a bass guitar, a guitar, percussion, a synthesizer, a violin, and a Wurlitzer electric piano. Several critics compared its synthesizer instrumentation and sequencer bass to Lustans Lakejer's 1982 song "Diamanter". Jan-Owe Wikström of Hallandsposten felt the verses recall both "Diamanter" and songs by ABBA.

Lyrically, "Lena Anthem" contains exaggerated and tongue-in-cheek statements that proclaim Philipsson greater than her rivals. Music commentators described the lyrics as "cocky" and "humorous". John Lucas of AllMusic interpreted the song as a "self-assured statement of intent and kiss-off to her critics and chart rivals". In the chorus, she sings "Mitt namn är Lena och jag tänker inte va' tyst / Jag tänker inte bara sitta här och vänta på att bli kysst" ("My name is Lena and I won't be quiet / I'm not just going to sit here and wait to be kissed"). The chorus ends with her asserting that she is "no ordinary Söderberg or Eriksson". In the bridge, she compares herself with fellow singers Regina Lund and Lisa Nilsson. Although the statement was described as an "attack" in the media, Philipsson clarified that the lyrics did not patronize Lund and Nilsson; she stated that the song was about herself and that the singers were mentioned in a humorous matter. She told Expressen that she was certain Nilsson would laugh upon hearing the song. Some commentators recognized "Lena Anthem" as Philipsson's signature song.

== Critical reception ==
"Lena Anthem" received generally positive reviews in the Swedish press. Anders Nunstedt of Expressen described the song as "very cool" and regarded it a "hard and cold disco statement". A reviewer writing for Göteborgs-Posten described the track as a "fun" and "cocky" album opener. While reviewing the parent album, David Stark of TT News Agency commented that Philipsson exudes confidence throughout the record, which he felt was the most evident with "Lena Anthem". He praised the humorous lyrics and the Lustans Lakejer-inspired production. Sydsvenskan critic Maria G. Francke wrote that its overconfident lyrics fit "perfectly" with Philipsson's vocal delivery. She praised its mixture of girl power themes and tongue-in-cheek lyrics, writing, "It's fun but not silly, smart but uncomplicated, glamorous but casual." An Upsala Nya Tidning critic felt Philippson's attitude on "Lena Anthem" alluded to her alter ego Agent 006 from her fifth studio album A Woman's Gotta Do What a Woman's Gotta Do (1991), as well as Madonna. The critic wrote that the song includes both provocative cockiness and disarming humor, which they felt signaled a big step from the Bert Karlsson "schlager factory" she originated from.

Micke Holmström of Norrköpings Tidningar selected "Lena Anthem" as the best track on the album, calling it "tough" and "funny". Henrik Rydström of Barometern named the song "powerful" and felt its confident lyrics were well-suited for Philipsson. Dan Backman, writing for Svenska Dagbladet, compared it to Philipsson's previous singles "Det gör ont" and "Delirium" and stated that it is "obviously intended to contribute to the singer's status as a gay diva". Johanna Hillgren of Södermanlands Nyheter enjoyed the lyrics, but critiqued the "boring" production. A critic from Arbetarbladet deemed the single "atrocious". Outside of Sweden, John Lucas of AllMusic named the song a "fabulous statement of intent" and a "relentless dance track". He wrote, "The lyrics not only proclaim Philipsson a step ahead of her rivals, but actually dare to name them, making the song not only one of the most irresistible hits of 2004, but also one of the funniest."

== Chart performance ==
Upon its release, "Lena Anthem" debuted at number four on the Sverigetopplistan singles chart on 22 October 2004, becoming the week's highest-placing debut. The song spent nine weeks in the top-ten, and remained on the chart for twenty-three non-consecutive weeks until 21 April 2005. The song was Philipsson's fourth consecutive top-five entry of 2004 on the chart. "Lena Anthem" debuted at number five on Svensktoppen, a key chart for Swedish-language singers based on jury votes, on 28 November 2004, after being a contender the week before. The song attained its peak position at number three the following week. The song also charted on Trackslistan, one of the most influential Swedish charts at the time, based on votes by radio listeners, where it debuted and peaked at number seven. By the end of 2004, the Swedish Recording Industry Association (GLF) ranked "Lena Anthem" as the 34th best-selling single of the year.

== Live performances ==
Philipsson performed "Lena Anthem" as the opening number on her 2004 Sweden tour. She also sang the song at the Rockbjörnen awards ceremony in January 2005, and as part of the interval act of the Melodifestivalen 2005 finale in March. She performed the song as a duet with Swedish Eurodance musician E-Type while participating on the second season of Så mycket bättre, which aired on TV4 in December 2011. Philipsson included the song as part of the encore of her 2011 krogshow "Min drömshow – 25 år som artist", staged at Cirkus in Stockholm to commemorate her 25 years in the music industry. Philipsson also performed the song on her 2016 krogshow "Jag är ingen älskling".

== Track listing ==
- CD single
1. "Lena Anthem" (radio edit) – 3:56
2. "Lena Anthem" (album version) – 4:13
3. "Delirium" (remix) – 5:17

== Credits and personnel ==
Credits are adapted from the Det gör ont en stund på natten men inget på dan liner notes.

- Erik Arvinder – violin
- Staffan Astner – bass guitar, guitar
- Björn Engelmann – mastering
- Anders Hansson – keyboard, percussion, production, programming, recording
- Kiah – backing vocals
- Ronny Lahti – mixing
- Jesper Nordenström – Wurlitzer
- Tim Norell – music (excerpts of "Dansa i neon")
- Orup – backing vocals, guitar, lyrics, music
- Lena Philipsson – backing vocals

== Charts ==
=== Weekly charts ===
Chart (2004)	Peak position
Sweden (Sverigetopplistan)	4

=== Year-end charts ===
Chart (2004)	Position
Sweden (Sverigetopplistan)	34

== Release history ==
Country	Date	Format	Label	Ref.
Sweden	11 October 2004	CD single	Columbia; Sony Music	
