= Hennes bästa =

Compilation album by Lena Philipsson
- Released: 8 June 1998
- Genre: Pop

Lena Philipsson chronology
Bästa vänner (1997)	Hennes bästa (1998)	Lena Philipsson Collection (2001)

Hennes bästa was released on 8 June 1998 and is a compilation album from Swedish pop singer Lena Philipsson.

== Track listing ==
=== CD1 ===
1. "Kärleken är evig"
2. "Tänd ett ljus"
3. "Stjärnorna"
4. "Dansa i neon"
5. "Månsken i augusti"
6. "Om igen"
7. "Aldrig mer"
8. "Det går väl an"
9. "Kärlek kommer med sommar"
10. "Det är över nu"
11. "Vila hos mig"

=== CD2 ===
1. "Talking in Your Sleep"
2. "Standing in My Rain"
3. "006"
4. "Are You In Or Are You Out"
5. "Taking Care Day"
6. "My Name"
7. "Why"
8. "The Murder"
9. "Fantasy"
10. "Dansa i neon" (Remix 98)
