= Lena Philipsson (disambiguation) =

Lena Philipsson is a Swedish singer. Lena Philipsson may also refer to:

- Lena Philipsson (1994 album), a compilation album
- Lena Philipsson (1995 album), a studio album

== See also ==
- Lena Philipsson Collection, a 2001 album
