= Så mycket bättre =

Swedish reality television show

- Intertitle
- Created by: FTV Rights B.V. - Holland
- Country of origin: Sweden
- Original language: Swedish
- No. of seasons: 15
- No. of episodes: 119

Production
- Executive producers: Joel Karsberg; Matilda Snöwall
- Producers: Daniel Edvardsson; Janca Hodann Söder
- Production locations: Gotland, Sweden
- Running time: 85 minutes
- Production company: Mastiff

Original release
- Network: TV4
- Release: 23 October 2010 – 26 December 2025

Så mycket bättre (Swedish: [ˈsoː ˈmʏ̂kːɛ ˈbɛ̌tːrɛ], lit. 'So Much Better') is a Swedish reality television show broadcast on TV4. The basic premise is that each participating musician performs their own version of a well-known song by another artist, with each episode focusing on every participant performing a different song by the same artist. The musicians spend eight days together at a hotel in Gotland, where they re-interpret the songs in their own styles.

The first series aired on 23 October 2010 and featured Lasse Berghagen, Barbro "Lill-Babs" Svensson, Petter, Thomas Di Leva, September, Christer Sandelin and Plura Jonsson. A second series premiered on 29 October 2011 and featured Lena Philipsson, Tomas Ledin, Eva Dahlgren, Mikael Wiehe, Timbuktu, Laleh and E-Type. A third season was launched on 27 October 2012 that included Darin Zanyar, Miss Li, Maja Ivarsson, Olle Ljungström, Magnus Uggla, Pugh Rogefeldt and Sylvia Vrethammar.

The format of the show is based on Beste Zangers, a Dutch show first broadcast in 2009, and since franchised to 9 countries. In January 2025, TV4 made the decision to put the show on hiatus after fifteen seasons.

== Summary ==
Series	Episodes	Originally released		Participants
Series	Episodes	First released	Last released	Participants
1	8	23 October 2010	11 December 2010	Christer Sandelin; Lasse Berghagen; Lill-Babs; Petter Askegren; Plura Jonsson; September; Thomas Di Leva
2	8	29 October 2011	17 December 2011	E-Type; Eva Dahlgren; Laleh; Lena Philipsson; Mikael Wiehe; Timbuktu; Tomas Ledin
3	9	27 October 2012	15 December 2012	Darin Zanyar; Magnus Uggla; Maja Ivarsson; Miss Li; Olle Ljungström; Pugh Rogefeldt; Sylvia Vrethammar
4	9	26 October 2013	14 December 2013	Agnes Carlsson; Bo Sundström; Ebbot Lundberg; Ken Ring; Lill Lindfors; Titiyo; Ulf Dageby
5	9	18 October 2014	6 December 2014	Amanda Jenssen; Carola Häggkvist; Familjen; Kajsa Grytt; Love Antell; Ola Salo; Orup
6	9	17 October 2015	12 December 2015	Andreas Kleerup; Ison & Fille; Jenny Berggren; Lisa Nilsson; Miriam Bryant; Niklas Strömstedt; Sven-Bertil Taube
7	9	22 October 2016	17 December 2016	Danny Saucedo; Freddie Wadling (died before filming); Jill Johnson; Lisa Ekdahl; Little Jinder; Magnus Carlson; Tommy Nilsson
8	9	21 October 2017	9 December 2017	Eric Saade; Icona Pop; Kikki Danielsson; Moneybrother; Sabina Ddumba; Tomas Andersson Wij; Uno Svenningsson
9	9	20 October 2018	15 December 2018	Albin Lee Meldau; Charlotte Perrelli; Christer Sjögren; Eric Gadd; Linnea Henriksson; Louise Hoffsten; Stor
10	8	19 October 2019	7 December 2019	Magnus Uggla (host); Miss Li (host); Petter (host); Carola Häggkvist; Danny Saucedo; Ebbot Lundberg; Magnus Carlson; Niklas Strömstedt; Orup; Petra Marklund; Jill Johnson; Little Jinder; Timbuktu; Titiyo
11	8	24 October 2020	19 December 2020	Ana Diaz (host); Markus Krunegård (host); Plura Jonsson (host); Benjamin Ingrosso; Helen Sjöholm; Jakob Hellman; Lili & Susie; Lisa Nilsson; Loreen; Newkid; Silvana Imam; Tommy Körberg; Tove Styrke
12	8	30 October 2021	18 December 2021	Melissa Horn (host); Thomas Stenström (host); Andreas Mattsson; Casper Janebrink; Daniel Adams-Ray; Cherrie; Gustaf & Victor Norén; Harpo; Marie Nilsson Lind; Maxida Märak; Moonica Mac; Peter Jöback; Siw Malmkvist
13	8	22 October 2022	17 December 2022	Anna Ternheim (host); Molly Hammar (host); Albin Lee Meldau; Anne-Lie Rydé; Daniela Rathana; Darin; John Engelbert; Maja Francis; Måns Zelmerlöw; Nordman; Norlie & KKV; Olle Jönsson
14	8	28 October 2023	17 December 2023	Ellen Kraus (host); Mapei (host); Peg Parnevik (host); Dogge Doggelito; Eagle-Eye Cherry; Jonathan Johansson; Lasse Holm; Marit Bergman; Omar Rudberg; Pär Wiksten; Sanne Salomonsen; Staffan Hellstrand
15	8	4 October 2024	22 November 2024	Dregen (host); Louise Lennartsson (host); Simon Superti (host); Alba August; Andreas Lundstedt; Arja Saijonmaa; Kerstin Ljungström; Peo Thyrén; Per Persson; Seinabo Sey; Sophie Zelmani
16	4	5 December 2025	26 December 2025	Så mycket bättre 15 years. Magnus Uggla leads viewers through the highlights of the series. Featuring interviews with artists, music journalists and industry profiles with clips from previous seasons.

== Series 1 (2010) ==
The first series began airing in October 2010 featuring Lasse Berghagen, Thomas Di Leva, Petter Askergren, Barbro Svensson, Christer Sandelin, September, and Plura Jonsson. A compilation album was released on 1 December 2010 as CD, digital download and on Spotify.

No. overall	No. in season	Title	Original release date	Viewers (millions)
1	1	"Lasse Berghagen"	23 October 2010	1.442
Thomas Di Leva: "Sträck ut din hand"; Plura Jonsson: "Min kärlekssång till dig"; Lill-Babs: "En kväll i juni"; Petter: "Stockholm i mitt hjärta" (own new version); Christer Sandelin: "Jennie, Jennie"; September: "Teddybjörnen Fredriksson"
2	2	"Thomas Di Leva"	30 October 2010	1.338
Lasse Berghagen: "Vi har bara varandra"; Plura Jonsson: "Miraklet"; Lill-Babs: "Vi får vingar när vi älskar"; Petter: "Dansa din djävul"; Christer Sandelin: "Naked number one"; September: "Vem ska jag tro på"
3	3	"Petter Askergren"	6 November 2010	1.177
Lasse Berghagen: "Längesen"; Thomas Di Leva: "Min egen kärleksaffär"; Plura Jonsson: "Logiskt"; Lill-Babs: "Så klart!"; Christer Sandelin: "Vinden har vänt"; September: "Mikrofonkåt"
4	4	"Barbro Svensson"	13 November 2010	1.345
Lasse Berghagen: "Är du kär i mig ännu, Klas-Göran?"; Thomas Di Leva: "När vi älskar"; Plura Jonsson: "Snurra min jord"; Petter: "En tuff brud i lyxförpackning"; Christer Sandelin: "April, april"; September: "Leva livet"
5	5	"Christer Sandelin"	20 November 2010	1.526
Lasse Berghagen: "Dover-Calais"; Thomas Di Leva: "Vill ha dig igen"; Plura Jonsson: "Det hon vill ha"; Petter: "Hjärtats ensamma slag"; Lill-Babs: "Fantasi"; September: "Vill ha dej"
6	6	"September"	27 November 2010	1.414
Lasse Berghagen: "Because I Love You"; Thomas Di Leva: "Cry for You"; Plura Jonsson: "La La La (Never Give It Up)"; Petter: "Satellites"; Lill-Babs: "Looking for Love"; Christer Sandelin: "Can't Get Over"
7	7	"Plura Jonsson"	4 December 2010	1.521
Lasse Berghagen: "Somliga går med trasiga skor"; Thomas Di Leva: "Kungarna från Broadway"; Lill-Babs: "Huvudet högt"; Petter: "Fulla för kärlekens skull"; Christer Sandelin: "Pojkar, pojkar, pojkar"; September: "Kärlekens tunga"
8	8	"Duets"	11 December 2010	1.484
Lasse Berghagen: "Ding-dong"; Thomas Di Leva och Lasse Berghagen: "Vad är frihet?; Lill-Babs och Christer Sandelin: "Jag vill leva"; Petter and Plura Jonsson: "Gör min dag"; Christer Sandelin and September: "Luften darrar"; Plura Jonsson and Thomas Di Leva: "Alice"; September and Petter: "Satellites"

== Series 2 (2011) ==
A second series began airing in October 2011 featuring Timbuktu, Laleh, Eva Dahlgren, Lena Philipsson, E-Type, Tomas Ledin, and Mikael Wiehe.

No. overall	No. in season	Title	Original release date	Viewers (millions)
9	1	"Tomas Ledin"	29 October 2011	1.912
Lena Philipsson: "Sensuella Isabella"; Laleh: "Just nu!"; Mikael Wiehe: "Blå blå känslor"; Timbuktu: "Snart tystnar musiken"; Eva Dahlgren: "Never Again"; E-Type: "Sommaren är kort"
10	2	"Eva Dahlgren"	5 November 2011	1.894
Timbuktu: "Kom och håll om mig"; Tomas Ledin: Vem tänder stjärnorna; Laleh: Ängeln i rummet; E-Type: Jag är Gud; Lena Philipsson: Jag klär av mig naken; Mikael Wiehe: För att du är här
11	3	"Timbuktu"	12 November 2011	1.852
Mikael Wiehe: Jag drar; Lena Philipsson: The botten is nådd; Eva Dahlgren: Strö lite socker på mig; Tomas Ledin: Gott folk; E-Type: Det löser sig; Laleh: Alla vill till himmelen men ingen vill dö
12	4	"Lena Philipsson"	26 November 2011	1.912
E-Type: Kärleken är evig; Timbuktu: Det gör ont; Eva Dahlgren: Standing In My Rain; Mikael Wiehe: Om igen; Laleh: På gatan där jag bor; Tomas Ledin: Dansa i neon
13	5	"E-Type"	26 November 2011	1.887
Tomas Ledin: Set the World on Fire; Timbuktu: True Believer; Laleh: Here I Go Again; Eva Dahlgren: This Is The Way; Mikael Wiehe: Calling Your Name; Lena Philipsson: Life
14	6	"Laleh"	3 December 2011	1.727
Eva Dahlgren: Call on Me; Tomas Ledin: Bjurö klubb; Mikael Wiehe: Han tuggar kex; E-Type: Snö; Lena Philipsson: Live Tomorrow; Timbuktu: Kamouflage (Invisible (My Song))
15	7	"Mikael Wiehe"	10 December 2011	1.469
E-Type: Titanic; Timbuktu: "Flickan och kråkan"; Eva Dahlgren: Mitt hjärtas fågel; Lena Philipsson: Vem kan man lita på?; Laleh: Fred; Tomas Ledin: Den jag kunde va
16	8	"Duets"	17 December 2011	1.898
Timbuktu & Lena Philipsson: Resten av ditt liv; Eva Dahlgren & Mikael Wiehe: Ung och stolt; E-Type & Tomas Ledin: Free Like A Flying Demon; Tomas Ledin & Timbuktu: En del av mitt hjärta; Lena Philipsson & E-Type: "Lena Anthem"; Laleh & Eva Dahlgren: Lär mig om; Mikael Wiehe & Laleh: Det här är ditt land

== Series 3 (2012) ==
A third series saw the participation of 7 artists: Magnus Uggla, Olle Ljungström, Darin Zanyar, Pugh Rogefeldt, Miss Li, Sylvia Vrethammar and Maja Ivarsson.

No. overall	No. in season	Title	Original release date	Viewers (millions)
17	1	"Pugh Rogefeldt"	27 October 2012	1.780
Magnus Uggla: Vandrar i ett regn; Miss Li: Här kommer natten; Olle Ljungström: Dinga linga Lena; Darin: Stockholm; Maja Ivarsson: Mitt bästa för dig; Sylvia Vrethammar: Små lätta moln
18	2	"Olle Ljungström"	3 November 2012	1.600
Pugh Rogefeldt: Överallt; Miss Li: Nåt för dom som väntar; Sylvia Vrethammar: Du sköna nya värld; Maja Ivarsson: Norrländska präriens gudinna; Magnus Uggla: Jag och min far; Darin: En apa som liknar dig
19	3	"Miss Li"	10 November 2012	1.895
Olle Ljungström: Om du lämnade mig nu; Sylvia Vrethammar: Oh Boy; Darin: I Can't Get You Off My Mind; Magnus Uggla: Har hört om en tjej; Maja Ivarsson: Dancing the Whole Way Home; Pugh Rogefeldt: You Could Have It (So Much Better Without Me)
20	4	"Magnus Uggla"	17 November 2012	1.990
Sylvia Vrethammar: Kung för en dag; Maja Ivarsson: Sommartid; Pugh Rogefeldt: Varning på stan; Darin: Astrologen; Miss Li - 1:a gången; Olle Ljungström: Johnny the Rucker
21	5	"Sylvia Vrethammar"	24 November 2012	2.010
Darin: Magdalena (Livet före döden); Olle Ljungström: Eviva España; Magnus Uggla: Tycker om dig; Maja Ivarsson: Hasta la Vista; Pugh Rogefeldt: Fröken i våran klass (En lärling på våran gård); Miss Li: Somebody Loves You; Result: Magnus Uggla - Tycker om dig
22	6	"Maja Ivarsson"	1 December 2012	1.760
Miss Li: No One Sleeps When I'm Awake; Magnus Uggla: Jag skiter i Amerika (original title "Living in America"); Olle Ljungström: Rock 'n Roll; Sylvia Vrethammar: Hej Monika (original title Hej hej Monika); Pugh Rogfeldt: Painted by Numbers; Darin: Seven Days a Week; Result: Sylvia Vrethammer - Hej Monika
23	7	"Darin Zanyar"	8 December 2012	1.825
Sylvia Vrethammar: Step up; Olle Ljungström: Who's That Girl; Magnus Uggla: Försvinn ur mitt liv (original title: "You're Out of My Life"); Maja Ivarsson: Want Ya!; Pugh Rogefeldt: Money for Nothing; Miss Li: Lovekiller
24	8	"All"	15 December 2012	1.805
Olle Ljungström & Miss Li: Som man bäddar; Maja Ivarsson & Pugh Rogefeldt: Hit Me!; Magnus Uggla & Olle Ljungström: Trubaduren; Sylvia Vrethammar & Darin: Strangers in the Night; Miss Li & Magnus Uggla: My Heart Goes Boom; Pugh Rogefeldt & Sylvia Vrethammar: Hog Farm; Darin & Maja Ivarsson: Nobody Knows
25	9	"Reunion"	25 December 2012	1.655
Sylvia Vrethammar: Kung för en dag; Miss Li: Här kommer natten; Olle Ljungström: Johnny the Rocker; Magnus Uggla: Jag och min far; Maja Ivarsson: Dancing the Whole Way Home; Pugh Rogefeldt: You Could Have It (So Much Better Without Me); Darin: En apa som liknar dig

== Series 4 (2013) ==
A fourth series saw the participation of 7 artists: Agnes, Ulf Dageby, Lill Lindfors, Ebbot Lundberg, Bo Sundström, Titiyo and Ken Ring.

No. overall	No. in season	Title	Original release date	Viewers (millions)
26	1	"Lill Lindfors"	26 October 2013	1.894
Bo Sundström: Jag tycker inte om dig; Ken Ring: Rus; Titiyo: Blåjeans och stjärnljus; Ulf Dageby: Du är den ende; Agnes: En så'n karl; Ebbot Lundberg: Fri som en vind
27	2	"Bo Sundström"	2 November 2013	1.601
Lill Lindfors: Hon är så söt när hon sover; Titiyo: Vi kommer aldrig att dö; Ulf Dageby: Snart kommer natten; Agnes: Allt ljus på mig!; Ebbot Lundberg: Dansa på min grav
28	3	"Ken Ring"	9 November 2013	1.702
Ulf Dageby: Jag minns ljudet från igår; Lill Lindfors: Mamma; Agnes: Nu måste vi dra; Bo Sundström: Jag skriver för er; Titiyo: Själen av en vän; Ebbot Lundberg: Allanballan
29	4	"Titiyo"	16 November 2013	1.633
Ulf Dageby: Come Along; Lill Lindfors: Talking to the Man in the moon; Agnes: Flowers; Bo Sundström: Longing for Lullabies; Ken Ring: This Is; Ebbot Lundberg: Lovin Out of Nothing
30	5	"Ulf Dageby"	23 November 2013	1.602
Bo Sundström: Mr John Carlos; Agnes: Hanna från Arlöv; Ebbot Lundberg: Barn av vår tid; Lill Lindfors: En dag på sjön; Ken Ring: Barn; Titiyo: Men bara om min älskade väntar
31	6	"Agnes"	30 November 2013	1.577
Bo Sundström: One Last Time; Ulf Dageby: On And On; Lill Lindfors: Right here right now; Ebbot Lundberg: Release Me; Ken Ring: All I Want Is You; Titiyo: I Need You Now
32	7	"Ebbot Lundberg"	7 December 2013	1.548
Titiyo: Sister Surround; Ken Ring: Firmament Vacation; Bo Sundström: Nevermore; Lill Lindfors: Pass Through Fear; Agnes: Instant Repeater; Ulf Dageby: Babel On
33	8	"All"	14 December 2013	1.431
34	9	"Reunion"	25 December 2013	1.027

== Series 5 (2014) ==
A fifth series saw the participation of 7 artists: Love Antell, Familjen, Kajsa Grytt, Carola Häggkvist (known as Carola) Amanda Jenssen, Orup, Ola Salo.

No. overall	No. in season	Title	Original release date	Viewers (millions)
35	1	"Ola Salo"	18 October 2014	2.305
Orup — Echo Chamber (Ekokammare); Amanda Jensen — Calleth You, Cometh I; Love Antell — One of Us is Gonna Die Young (En av oss kommer dö ung); Kajsa Grytt — It Takes a Fool to Remain Sane; Carola Häggkvist — Tell Me this Night is Over; Johan T Karlsson — Breaking Up With God (Göra slut med Gud)
36	2	"Orup"	25 October 2014	1.989
Kajsa Grytt — Magaluf; Love Antell — Från Djursholm till Danvikstull; Carola Häggkvist — Sjung halleluja (och prisa Gud); Ola Salo — Trubbel (Trouble); Johan T Karlsson — Regn hos mig; Amanda Jensen — "När vi gräver guld i USA (When We Dig for Gold in the USA)"
37	3	"Amanda Jenssen"	1 November 2014	1.752
Ola Salo — Dry My Soul; Johan T Karlsson — Do You Love Me? (Vill du ha mig?); Kajsa Grytt — Ghost (Kall); Love Antell — Happyland (I vårt lyckoland); Orup — Illusionist (Magiker); Carola Häggkvist — For the Sun
38	4	"Kajsa Grytt"	8 November 2014	1.389
Johan T Karlsson — Slicka mig ren; Carola Häggkvist — Bakom allt; Love Antell — Dunkar Varmt; Orup — Brinna; Ola Salo — Allt faller; Amanda Jensen — Vågar du vara ensam i natt
39	5	"Familjen"	15 November 2014	1.206
Carola Häggkvist — Nyår; Ola Salo — Vi va dom; Orup — Det snurrar i min skalle; Love Antell — Man ser det från månen; Kajsa Grytt — Väger ett andetag; Amanda Jenssen — När planeterna stannat
40	6	"Carola"	22 November 2014	1.985
Kajsa Grytt — Det regnar i Stockholm; Love Antell — Tommy tycker om mig; Orup — Främling; Ola Salo — The Runaway; Amanda Jenssen — Fångad av en stormvind; Johan T Karlsson — Tokyo
41	7	"Love Antell"	30 November 2014	1.312
Orup — Pokerkväll i Vårby Gård (Pokerkväll på Björngårdsgata); Ola Salo — Du växer upp; Amanda Jenssen — Stjärna där; Kajsa Grytt — Spring Ricco; Johan T Karlsson — Vårt hem, vår borg; Carola Häggkvist — Gatorna tillhör oss
42	8	"Duets"	6 December 2014	1.309
43	9	"Reunion"	25 December 2014	1.003

== Series 6 (2015) ==
A sixth series saw the participation of 7 artists: Niklas Strömstedt, Sven-Bertil Taube, Miriam Bryant, Jenny Berggren, Ison & Fille (Ison Glasgow and Felipe Leiva Wenger), Andreas Kleerup, and Lisa Nilsson.

No. overall	No. in season	Title	Original release date	Viewers (millions)
44	1	"Niklas Strömstedt"	17 October 2015	1.627
45	2	"Sven-Bertil Taube"	24 October 2015	1.811
46	3	"Miriam Bryant"	31 October 2015	1.662
47	4	"Jenny Berggren"	7 November 2015	1.711
48	5	"Ison & Fille"	14 November 2015	1.133
49	6	"Andreas Kleerup"	21 November 2015	1.456
50	7	"Lisa Nilsson"	28 November 2015	1.524
51	8	"Duets"	5 December 2015	1.543
52	9	"Reunion"	12 December 2015	1.230

== Series 7 (2016) ==
A seventh series saw the participation of 6 artists: Magnus Carlson, Lisa Ekdahl, Jill Johnson, Little Jinder (Josefine Jinder), Tommy Nilsson, Danny Saucedo. A seventh artist, Freddie Wadling was also scheduled, but he died before the shooting of the episodes. The remaining six performers still interpreted his songs, as a tribute. An additional episode where the artists paid tribute to dead singer Ted Gärdestad was aired, in which his brother and songwriter Kenneth Gärdestad appeared as a guest.

No. overall	No. in season	Title	Original release date	Viewers (millions)
53	1	"Tommy Nilsson"	22 October 2016	1.965
54	2	"Magnus Carlson"	29 October 2016	1.942
55	3	"Freddie Wadling"	5 November 2016	1.694
56	4	"Little Jinder"	12 November 2016	1.586
57	5	"Lisa Ekdahl"	19 November 2016	1.792
58	6	"Danny Saucedo"	26 November 2016	1.584
59	7	"Jill Johnson"	3 December 2016	1.596
60	8	"Ted Gärdestad tribute"	10 December 2016	1.457
61	9	"Reunion"	17 December 2016	0.984

== Series 8 (2017) ==
An eighth series saw the participation of 7 artists: Kikki Danielsson, Sabina Ddumba, Icona Pop (duo of Caroline Hjelt and Aino Jawo), Moneybrother (Anders Olof Wendin), Eric Saade, Uno Svenningsson and Tomas Andersson Wij. An additional episode that paid tribute to then recently passed dansband and country singer Sven-Erik Magnusson was aired, in which his son Oscar Magnusson appeared as guest.

No. overall	No. in season	Title	Original release date	Viewers (millions)
62	1	"Uno Svenningsson"	21 October 2017	1.767
Anders "Moneybrother" Wendin – "Tro på varann"; Sabina Ddumba – "Vågorna"; Eric Saade – "Allt man kan önska sig"; Tomas Andersson Wij – "I en annan del av världen"; Kikki Danielsson – "At the Border" (English version of "Under ytan"); Icona Pop – "Det måste gå"
63	2	"Moneybrother"	28 October 2017	1.330
Eric Saade – "Born Under a Bad Sign"; Uno Svenningsson – "Du kommer ångra det här" (own Swedish version of "You'll Be Sorry"); Sabina Ddumba – "It's Been Hurting All the Way with You, Joanna"; Kikki Danielsson – "Reconsider Me"; Icona Pop – "They're Building Walls Around Us"; Tomas Andersson Wij – "Snart kommer det en båt" (samma låt med ändrad text)
64	3	"Sabina Ddumba"	4 November 2017	1.376
Icona Pop – "Not Too Young"; Tomas Andersson Wij – "Märkt av dig" (Original: "Scarred For Life"); Anders "Moneybrother" Wendin – "Sabina säger" (Original:"Kingdom Come"); Uno Svenningsson – "Effortless"; Kikki Danielsson – "Did It For The Fame"; Eric Saade – "Vill" (Original: "Want")
65	4	"Eric Saade"	11 November 2017	1.314
Uno Svenningsson – "Slå!" (Original: "Sting"); Kikki Danielsson – "Darkest Hour"; Icona Pop – "Hearts in the Air"; Sabina Ddumba – "Manboy"; Tomas Andersson Wij – "Den dag jag vinner allt" (Original: "Popular"); Anders "Moneybrother" Wendin – "Wide Awake"
66	5	"Kikki Danielsson"	18 November 2017	1.661
Sabina Ddumba – "Varför är kärleken röd?"; Tomas Andersson Wij – "Godmorgon"; Uno Svenningsson – "Prins Decibel" (original: "Miss Decibel"); Eric Saade – "Bra vibrationer"; Icona Pop – "Don't Slam the Door"; Anders "Moneybrother" Wendin – "Du ser mig inte längre" (original: "It's Not About Me Anymore")
67	6	"Tomas Andersson Wij"	25 November 2017	1.238
Anders "Moneybrother" Wendin – "Tommy och hans mamma"; Kikki Danielsson – "Hälsingland"; Icona Pop – "The City We Call Home" (original: "Landet vi föddes i"); Uno Svenningsson – "Ett slag för dig"; Sabina Ddumba – "Orden i vinden"; Eric Saade – "Där får du andas ut"
68	7	"Icona Pop"	2 December 2017	1.228
Eric Saade – "We Got The World"; Tomas Andersson Wij – "All Night"; Uno Svenningsson – "Ingen är som jag" (original: "Manners"); Anders "Moneybrother" Wendin – "I Love It"; Kikki Danielsson – "Emergency"; Sabina Ddumba – "Brightside"
69	8	"Sven-Erik Magnusson tribute"	9 December 2017	1.767
Uno Svenningsson – "Säg inte nej, säg kanske"; Eric Saade – "Fånga en dröm"; Kikki Danielsson – "Det var dans bort i vägen"; Icona Pop – "Sommar och sol"; Tomas Andersson Wij – "När solen färgar juninatten"; Anders "Moneybrother" Wendin – "Anita"; Sabina Ddumba – "Två mörka ögon"; Oscar Magnusson – "Så många mil så många år"
70	9	"Reunion"	16 December 2017	1.256

== Series 9 (2018) ==
A ninth series saw the participation of 7 artists: Eric Gadd, Louise Hoffsten, Linnea Henriksson, Charlotte Perrelli, Stor, Christer Sjögren, and Albin Lee Meldau.

No. overall	No. in season	Title	Original release date	Viewers (millions)
71	1	"Eric Gadd"	20 October 2018	1.600
Linnea Henriksson - "The right way"; Stor - "Stockholm står kvar"; Louise Hoffsten - "Kom hit och ta"; Charlotte Perrelli - "Kommer du att tro på mig" (Swedish version of Do You Believe in Me); Albin Lee Meldau - "Bara himlen ser på"; Christer Sjögren - "My Personality"
72	2	"Louise Hoffsten"	27 October 2018	1.510
Christer Sjögren - "Only the Dead Fish Follow the Stream"; Albin Lee Meldau - "Spela min favoritvals" (Swedish version of My Favorite Lie); Charlotte Perrelli - "That's What I Get"; Stor - "Purple Haze" (own version of Nowhere In This World); Eric Gadd - "Hit Me With Your Lovething"; Linnea Henriksson - "Dansa på min grav"
73	3	"Linnea Henriksson"	3 November 2018	1.245
Charlotte Perrelli - "Släpper allt"; Albin Lee Meldau - "I know something that you don't know" (English version of Jag vet nåt som inte du vet); Christer Sjögren - "Lyckligare nu"; Louise Hoffsten - "Halmstad"; Stor - "Säga mig"; Eric Gadd - "Mina händer"
74	4	"Charlotte Perrelli"	10 November 2018	1.479
Eric Gadd - "Flowers of the fall" (English version of Höstens sista blomma); Louise Hoffsten - "Addicted"; Albin Lee Meldau - "Tusen och en natt"; Linnea Henriksson - "Hero"; Christer Sjögren - "Don't Cry for Me Argentina"; Stor - "Mitt liv" (feat. Yoel905)
75	5	"Stor"	17 November 2018	1.369
Eric Gadd - "Vägen hem" (feat. Fricky); Christer Sjögren - "Pappas låt"; Albin Lee Meldau - "Some Loving" (English version of Lite...kärlek); Louise Hoffsten - "Nighttime"; Linnea Henriksson - "Småtjejer" (own version of Svartskallar); Charlotte Perrelli - "Stolthet"
76	6	"Christer Sjögren"	24 November 2018	1.661
Charlotte Perrelli - "Flickan från Småland" (own version of En enkel från Hagfors); Eric Gadd - "Leende guldbruna ögon"; Stor - "Veronica"; Linnea Henriksson - "Den stora dagen"; Louise Hoffsten - "Ljus och värme"; Albin Lee Meldau - "Kan man älska nå'n på avstånd"
77	7	"Albin Lee Meldau"	1 December 2018	1.261
Stor - "Gamla och grå" (Swedish version of Try); Christer Sjögren - "Same boat"; Linnea Henriksson - "I need your love"; Eric Gadd - "The Weight Is Gone"; Charlotte Perrelli - "Låt mig gå" (Swedish version of Let me go); Louise Hoffsten - "Lou Lou"
78	8	"Monica Zetterlund tribute"	8 December 2018	1.179
Eric Gadd - "Sakta vi gå genom stan"; Christer Sjögren - "Var blev ni av ljuva drömmar"; Albin Lee Meldau - "Visa från Utanmyra"; Louise Hoffsten - "Jag vet en dejlig rosa"; Charlotte Perrelli - "Under vinrankan"; Linnea Henriksson - "Some other time"; Stor - "Små gröna äpplen" (feat Seinabo Sey)
79	9	"Reunion"	15 December 2018	1.081

== Series 10 (2019) ==
A tenth series saw the participation of 13 (14) artists: Magnus Uggla, Miss Li and Petter participated in 8 programmes. The format of the show was changed this season to celebrate the ten year anniversary with guest artist visiting. Carola Häggkvist (4 of 8 programmes), Orup (4/8), Timbuktu (4/8), Danny Saucedo (3/8), Ebbot Lundberg (3/8), Petra Marklund (3/8), Jill Johnson (2/8), Little Jinder (2/8), Niklas Strömstedt (2/8), Titiyo (2/8).

Sven-Bertil Taubes participation was cancelled due to sickness.

Further artists appeared as guests for one, or several, performances.

== Series 11 (2020) ==
An eleventh series saw the participation of Benjamin Ingrosso, Plura Jonsson, Ana Diaz, Markus Krunegård, Lisa Nilsson, Helen Sjöholm, Tommy Körberg, Silvana Imam, Jakob Hellman, Newkid, Lili & Susie, Loreen and Tove Styrke.

== See also ==
- The Best Singers
