= Boy (Lena Philipsson album) =

Compilation album by Lena Philipsson
- Released: 1987
- Genre: Pop

Lena Philipsson chronology
| Dansa i neon (1987) | Boy (1987) | Hitlåtar med Lena Philipsson 1985-1987 (1988) |

Boy is a 1987 compilation album from Swedish pop singer Lena Philipsson.

== Track listing ==
1. "Åh Amadeus" – 3.35
2. "Vindarnas väg" – 3.42
3. "Sommartid" – 3.38
4. "När jag behöver dig som mest" – 4.21
5. "Kärleken är evig" – 3.03
6. "Segla" – 3.55
7. "Boy" – 2.50
8. "Oskuldens ögon" – 4.30
9. "Dansa i neon" – 3.20
10. "Jag känner (Ti sento)" – 4.01
11. "Det går väl an" – 3.54
12. "Cheerio" – 3.51
