= Delirium (song) =

2004 single by Lena Philipsson

Single by Lena Philipsson

from the album Det gör ont en stund på natten men inget på dan
- Released: 7 July 2004
- Genre: Disco; power pop
- Length: 4:23
- Label: Columbia; Sony Music
- Songwriter: Orup
- Producer: Anders Hansson

Lena Philipsson singles chronology
| "It Hurts" (2004) | "Delirium" (2004) | "Lena Anthem" (2004) |

"Delirium" is a song by Swedish singer Lena Philipsson from her ninth studio album Det gör ont en stund på natten men inget på dan (2004). It was released as the album's second single on 7 July 2004 through Columbia and Sony Music. Written by Thomas "Orup" Eriksson and produced by Anders Hansson, "Delirium" is a disco and power pop song with synthesizer and guitar instrumentation and schlager influences.

The song received generally positive reviews from music critics, some of whom praised its catchiness. "Delirium" was Philipsson's third consecutive top-five entry of 2004 on the Sverigetopplistan singles chart, peaking at number five. The song also attained top-ten positions on the Svensktoppen and Trackslistan charts. The song was ranked at number 32 on the 2004 year-end chart of Sverigetopplistan.

== Background ==
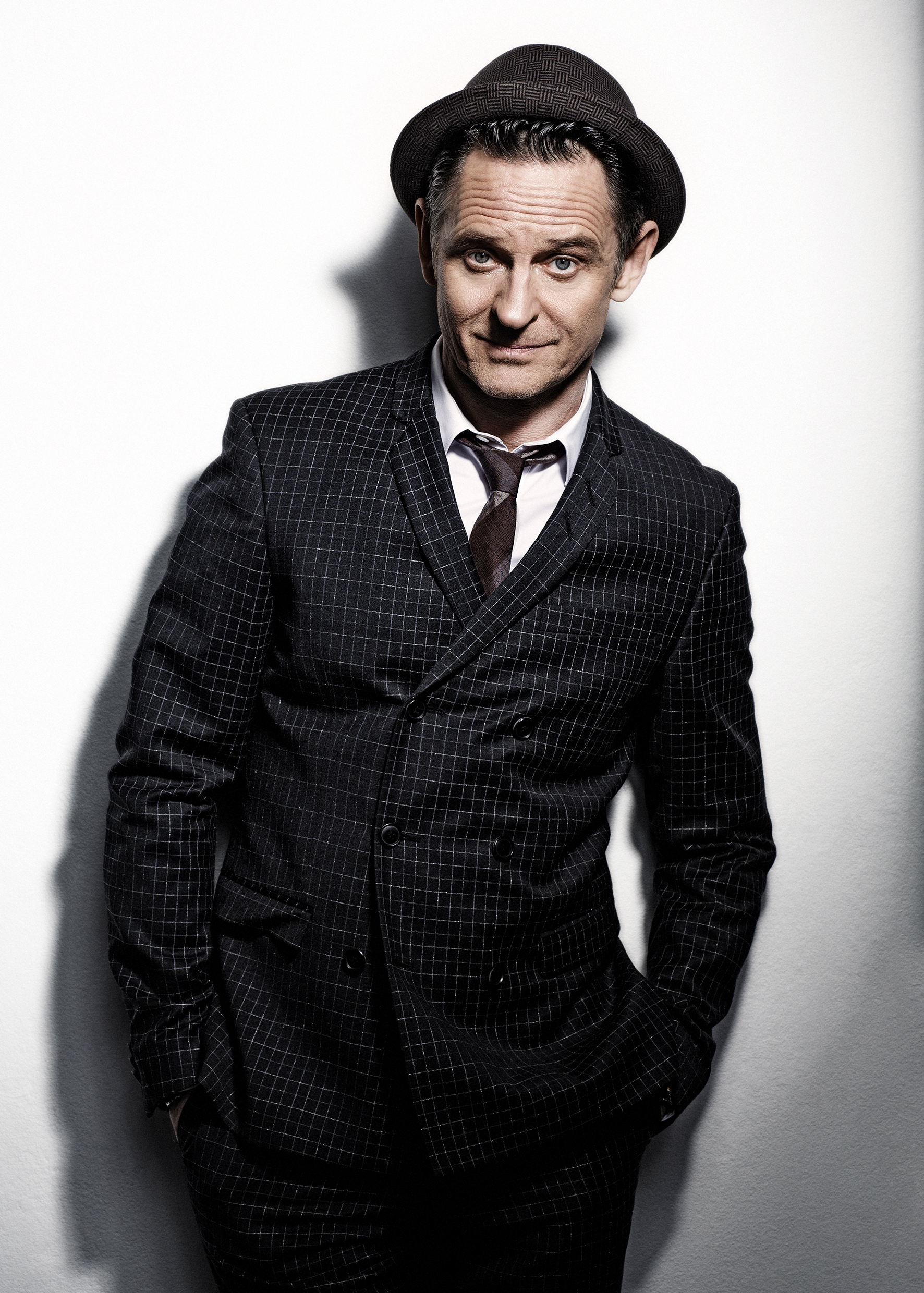
Orup wrote the music and lyrics for "Delirium".

"Delirium" was written by Thomas "Orup" Eriksson for Lena Philipsson's studio album Det gör ont en stund på natten men inget på dan (2004). Philipsson enlisted Orup to write the entirety of the album's music and lyrics. The two started working on the record after she won Melodifestivalen 2004 with "Det gör ont", which advanced her to the Eurovision Song Contest 2004 in Istanbul, Turkey, where she finished fifth in the final. In an interview for Aftonbladet, Philipsson described "Delirium" as a "contrast" to "Det gör ont" and lauded Orup's songwriting. She elaborated in a later interview, "I really like this one and I've listened to it a lot so I'm starting to get a little tired of it. I think it's so typical of Orup to come up with the title 'Delirium' ... I smiled the first time I heard it. First a song called 'Det gör ont' ('It Hurts') and then 'Delirium' – yes, what an album!" Orup also provided backing vocals on "Delirium".

Anders Hansson produced the song and handled its recording. The track was mixed by Lennart Östlund and mastered by Björn Engelmann. "Delirium" was sent to Swedish radio stations on 18 June 2004 as the second single from Det gör ont. It was released for purchase on 7 July 2004 through Columbia and Sony Music, as a CD single and digital download. The single artwork was photographed by Jonas Linell and designed by Karl-Magnus Boske. The release included "Delirium" and an extended version of "Det gör ont", written by Orup and produced by Hansson. It also included a polyphonic ringtone of "Delirium". A remix of the track was released with the album's next single "Lena Anthem" on 11 October 2004.

== Composition and lyrics ==
Musically, "Delirium" is a disco and power pop song, with a schlager chorus. Anders Nunstedt of Expressen described the song as an "update" of The Pointer Sisters's 1984 song "Jump (For My Love)". A critic from Länstidningen Östersund noted its 1980s-inspired synthesizer instrumentation as well as 2000s rock guitars. Philipsson sings lyrics such as "Jag lever i min fantasi, en mycket bättre verklighet" ("I live in my fantasy, a much better reality"), and "Jag gör vad ingen annan vet i mitt rum, jag lever i delirium" ("I do what no one else knows in my room, I live in delirium"). The Länstidningen Östersund critic interpreted its lyrics as "completely mad", as if Philipsson was wearing a straitjacket while singing, and Per Bjurman of Aftonbladet described them as humorous and ironic.

== Critical reception ==
"Delirium" received generally positive reviews in the Swedish press. Jonas Fahlman of Norran named it one of the best tracks on Det gör ont, and Håkan Pettersson of Nerikes Allehanda felt it represented Philipsson at her best and called it "perfect". Per Bjurman of Aftonbladet opined that the song may not be fully as catchy as "Det gör ont", but nonetheless a good mixture of classic schlager and modern pop. He went on to praise the singer's vocal performance and Orup's "ingenious" lyrics. A critic from Vimmerby Tidning felt the song was well-suited for Philipsson's vocals and attitude. Anders Nunstedt of Expressen felt its "frisky" schlager chorus could have a chance of winning Melodifestivalen, and noted the production as "very simple" and radio-friendly. Maria G. Francke, writing for Sydsvenskan, opined that the song was just as "fantastic" as "Det gör ont". A reviewer from Länstidningen Östersund praised the catchy chorus and 1980s-inspired synth production. Similarly, Åsa Johansson of Falu Kuriren called it a catchy pop song, while Micke Holmström of Norrköpings Tidningar characterized it as "cheeky" and "cool". Piteå-Tidningen critic Anders Sandlund was less enthusiastic and regarded the single as "strenuous" and named it the worst track on Det gör ont. Outside of Sweden, John Lucas of AllMusic was positive in his review, praising its "instantly memorable hook".

== Chart performance ==
Upon its release, "Delirium" entered the Sverigetopplistan singles chart on 16 July 2004 at number five, the highest-charting debut of the week. The song ranked in the top-ten for seven weeks, and remained on the chart for twenty non-consecutive weeks until its final appearance on 2 December 2004. The song was Philipsson's third consecutive top-five entry of 2004 on the chart after "Det gör ont" and its English-language version "It Hurts". "Delirium" debuted at number seven on the Svensktoppen chart on 15 August 2004. It reached its peak position on 5 September 2004 at number three, where it remained for two weeks. The song also charted on Trackslistan at number four. By the end of 2004, the Swedish Recording Industry Association (GLF) ranked "Delirium" as the 32nd best-selling single of the year.

== Track listing ==
- CD single / digital download
1. "Delirium" – 4:23
2. "Det gör ont" (extended mix) – 3:33

== Credits and personnel ==
Credits are adapted from the Det gör ont en stund på natten men inget på dan liner notes.

- Orup – music and lyrics
- Anders Hansson – production, recording
- Lennart Östlund – mixing
- Björn Engelmann – mastering

== Charts ==
=== Weekly charts ===
| Chart (2004) | Peak position |
|---|---|
| Sweden (Sverigetopplistan) | 5 |

=== Year-end charts ===
| Chart (2004) | Position |
|---|---|
| Sweden (Sverigetopplistan) | 32 |

== Release history ==
| Country | Date | Format | Label | Ref. |
|---|---|---|---|---|
| Sweden | 18 June 2004 | Radio | Columbia; Sony Music | |
| Sweden | 7 July 2004 | CD single | Columbia; Sony Music | |
| Sweden | 7 July 2004 | Digital download | Sony Music | |
