= Juliette & Jonathan =

Single by Lotta Engberg

from the album Äntligen på väg
- Released: 1996
- Recorded: 1996
- Genre: Pop
- Label: ?
- Songwriter(s): Monica Forsberg and Torgny Söderberg

"Juliette & Jonathan" is a 1996 Swedish language pop song that Lotta Engberg sang when she competed in the Swedish Melodifestivalen 1996, and finished 3rd. The song was written by Monica Forsberg and Torgny Söderberg. Even Lena Philipsson has recorded this song, and she released it on her 2006 album "Lady Star". At first, it was thought that Lena Philipsson should sing this song at Melodifestivalen 1996. "Juliette & Jonathan" is a song whose text is about love, but has an anti-racist theme. The song text is about Juliette and Jonathan, two people from different backgrounds who fall in love with each other. According to the song text, love doesn't know any borders or color of skin.

The single peaked at #51 at the Swedish singles chart.

At Svensktoppen, the song stayed for 5 weeks, 20 April-18 May 1996, with a 3rd place as best result there.

The song won the 1996 Second Chance Contest.

== Cover versions ==
This song has been covered (titled "Juliet ja Joonatan") by the Finnish singer Anna Eriksson on her 1997 album Anna Eriksson. The Lena Philipsson version is on her 2006 album Lady Star.

== Track listing (Lotta Engberg single) ==
1. Juliette & Jonathan
2. Högt i det blå

== Lotta Engberg version chart performance ==
Sweden Top 60
Week	29 March 1996	5 April 1996
Position	51	59

== Chart positions ==
Chart (1996)	Peak position
Sweden (Sverigetopplistan)	51
