= Hanna Fahl =

Swedish music journalist and translator (born 1978)

- Born: October 23, 1978 (age 47); Lidköping, Sweden
- Occupations: Music journalist, translator, radio host
- Employer: Sveriges Radio
- Known for: Host of P3 Pop; Member of the band Kissing Mirrors
- Notable work: P3 Pop; Vocals and flute in Kissing Mirrors

Hanna Fahl (born October 23, 1978, in Lidköping) is a Swedish music journalist and translator. She is also the host of P3 Pop, a radio show on P3, Sveriges Radio. She sings vocals and plays flute in Kissing Mirrors, a death-pop band from Stockholm.

Thomas "Orup" Eriksson is said to have been inspired by her when writing lyrics for the song Indiedrottning from the 2006 album Faktiskt.
