= Hitlåtar med Lena Philipsson 1985–1987 =

Compilation album by Lena Philipsson
- Released: 1988
- Recorded: 1985–1987
- Genre: Pop

Lena Philipsson chronology
Boy (1987)	Hitlåtar med Lena Philipsson 1985–1987 (1988)	Talking in Your Sleep (1988)

Hitlåtar med Lena Philipsson 1985–1987 is a 1988 compilation album from Swedish pop singer Lena Philipsson.

== Track listing ==
1. "Boy"
2. "Kärleken är evig"
3. "Sommartid"
4. "Jag sänder på min radio"
5. "Cheerio"
6. "Om kärleken är blind"
7. "Jag känner"
8. "Saknar dej innan du går"
9. "Den ende"
10. "När jag behöver dig som mest"
11. "You Open My Eyes"
12. "Om du ger upp"
13. "Segla"
14. "Det går väl an"
15. "Kom"
16. "Dansa i neon"
