= Lena Philipsson (1994 album) =

Compilation album by Lena Philipsson
- Released: 1994
- Recorded: 1986–1993
- Genre: Pop

Lena Philipsson chronology
Fantasy (1993)	Lena Philipsson (1994)	Lena Philipsson (1995)

Lena Philipsson is a 1994 compilation album from Swedish pop singer Lena Philipsson.

== Track listing ==
1. "Åh Amadeus"
2. "Vindarnas väg"
3. "Sommartid"
4. "När jag behöver dig som mest"
5. "Kärleken är evig"
6. "Segla"
7. "Boy"
8. "Oskuldens ögon"
9. "Dansa i neon"
10. "Jag känner (Ti sento)"
11. "Det går väl an"
12. "Cheerio"
