= Tolkningarna =

Tolkningarna means interpretations in Swedish. It may refer to:

- Tolkningarna, 2011 EP by Lena Philipsson
- Tolkningarna, 2012 EP by Laleh
- Tolkningarna, 2013 EP by Pugh Rogefeldt
- Så mycket bättre 2017 – Tolkningarna, interpretations of a Swedish TV series Så mycket bättre
- Så mycket bättre 2020 – Tolkningarna
