= I regret nothing =

I regret nothing is a catchphrase that may refer to:

- "Non, je ne regrette rien" ("No, I regret nothing"), French song by Charles Dumont
- Jag ångrar ingenting, album from Swedish pop singer Lena Philipsson
  - Jag ångrar ingenting (song), song from the album
- "Ich bereue nichts" ("I Regret Nothing"), track from album Aggro Berlin by German rapper Sido
- "She's Got Haggar Party Slacks / I Regret Nothing", single from band Atomic 7
- I Regret Nothing, memoir of American author Jen Lancaster
- "Je Regret Nothing", a 2013 episode of Miranda
- Catchphrase used by the protagonist of the Postal video game franchise, when he commits suicide

== See also ==
- "Nothing to Regret", song by New Zealand singer Robinson
