= På gatan där jag bor =

Single by Lena Philipsson

from the album Det gör ont en stund på natten men inget på dan
- Released: 5 January 2005
- Length: 4:12
- Label: Columbia; Sony Music
- Songwriter: Orup
- Producer: Johan Åberg

Lena Philipsson singles chronology
"Lena Anthem" (2004)	"På gatan där jag bor" (2005)	"Unga pojkar & äldre män" (2005)

"På gatan där jag bor" ("On the street where I live") is a song by Swedish singer Lena Philipsson from her studio album Det gör ont en stund på natten men inget på dan (2004). Written by Orup and produced by Johan Åberg, "På gatan där jag bor" was released as the album's fourth and final single on 5 January 2005 through Columbia and Sony Music.

The song was released as a single in early 2005, peaking at 26th position at the Swedish singles chart. The song also became a radio hit that year, staying at Trackslistan for three weeks during the period 15–29 January 2005, peaking at 14th position.

The song also chartered at Svensktoppen, staying for six weeks between 30 January-6 March 2005 peaking at 5th position before leaving the chart.

In November 2011, Laleh covered the song on the second season of Så mycket bättre.

== Track listing ==
- CD single
1. "På gatan där jag bor" – 4:12

== Credits and personnel ==
Credits are adapted from the Det gör ont en stund på natten men inget på dan liner notes.

- Orup – music and lyrics
- Johan Åberg – production, recording
- Ronny Lahti – mixing
- Björn Engelmann – mastering

== Charts ==
Chart (2005)	Peak position
Sweden (Sverigetopplistan)	26

== Release history ==
Country	Date	Format	Label	Ref.
Sweden	5 January 2005	CD single	Columbia; Sony Music	
