= Vänner =

Vänner is Swedish for "friends" and may refer to:-

- Bästa vänner (Best friends), a 1997 album from Swedish pop singer Lena Philipsson.
- Riltons Vänner (Rilton's Friends), a Swedish professional a cappella group
- Vänner och fiender (Friends and Foes), a Swedish soap opera
- Vanner may also refer to a historic ore-dressing machine
- Vanner (band), a South Korean boy band
