= Talking in Your Sleep (Lena Philipsson album) =

Studio album by Lena Philipsson
- Released: 2 May 1988
- Genre: Pop

Lena Philipsson chronology
Hitlåtar med Lena Philipsson 1985-1987 (1988)	Talking in Your Sleep (1988)	My Name (1989)

Talking in Your Sleep (released on 5 May 1988) is an album from Swedish pop singer Lena Philipsson. It peaked at #10 at the Swedish album chart. On this album, she combines singing in Swedish and English.

== Track listing ==
1. "Talking in Your Sleep" (music: Lena Philipsson, lyrics: Ingela Forsman)
2. "Säg, säg, säg" (music and lyrics: Torgny Söderberg)
3. "Ain't it Just the Way" (music: Lena Philipsson, lyrics: Ingela Forsman)
4. "The Key" (music and lyrics: Errol Starr and Eddie Schwartz)
5. "I varje spegel" (music: Torgny Söderberg, lyrics: Ingela Forsman)
6. "Never is a Long Time" (music and lyrics: Per Gessle)
7. "Om igen" (music: Bobby Ljunggren, Håkan Almqvist, lyrics: Ingela Forsman)
8. "Sommarnatt" (music: Lasse Andersson, lyrics: Ingela Forsman)
9. "Jag kan, jag vill" (music & text: Lena Philipsson)
10. "What Do You Know" (music: Anders Glenmark, lyrics: Ingela Forsman)
11. "I'm a Fool" (music and lyrics: Lena Philipsson)
12. "Vem skall sova över" (music and lyrics: Torgny Söderberg)
13. "Take it or Leave It" (music: Lasse Andersson, lyrics: Per Gessle)

== Charts ==
Chart (1986)	Peak position
Sweden (Sverigetopplistan)	9
