= Jag ångrar ingenting (song) =

2005 Lena Philipsson song

Single by Lena Philipsson

from the album Jag ångrar ingenting
- Released: 5 April 2006
- Songwriters: Orup, Bo Kaspers orkester

Lena Philipsson singles chronology
"Han jobbar i affär" (2005)	"Jag ångrar ingenting" (2006)	"Det ringer på min dörr" (2006)

"Jag ångrar ingenting", written by Orup and Bo Kaspers orkester, is a song performed by Lena Philipsson on her 2005 album Jag ångrar ingenting. Attention was brought to the song as Lena Philipsson performed it when hosting Melodifestivalen 2006, after causing controversies with jokes about participants. The single was released on 5 April 2006. The song also charted at Svensktoppen where it stayed for one week, on 21 May 2006 ending up at 9th position. The song also stayed at Trackslistan for one week, on 15 April 2006 peaking at number 19 on the chart.
