= My Name (Lena Philipsson album) =

Studio album by Lena Philipsson
- Released: 20 October 1989
- Genre: Pop
- Label: wonderful label

Lena Philipsson chronology
Talking in Your Sleep (1988)	My Name (1989)	A Woman's Gotta Do What a Woman's Gotta Do (1991)

My Name is a 1989 album by Swedish pop singer Lena Philipsson. The album peaked at #10 at the Swedish album chart. On the album, she contributed as songwriter together with Torgny Söderberg. The entire album is in English and sold 130,000 copies within 2 months.

== Track listing ==
1. "LoPhus"
2. "My Name"
3. "Standing In My Rain"
4. "Together We're Alone"
5. "Only You (Can Move Me Like You Do)"
6. "Blue Jeans"
7. "LooPHus"
8. "Why (Så lätt kommer du inte undan)"
9. "Strong Man"
10. "Taking-Care Day"
11. "Taboo Taboo"
12. "How Does It Feel"
13. "Leave A Light"

== Chart positions ==
Chart (1989–1990)	Peak position
Sweden	10
