= Världen snurrar =

Studio album by Lena Philipsson
- Released: February 15, 2012
- Genre: pop
- Length: 36 minutes

Lena Philipsson chronology
Dubbel (2008)	Världen snurrar (2012)	Jag är ingen älskling (2015)

Världen snurrar is a 2012 Lena Philipsson studio album.

== Track listing ==
1. "Du följer väl med?" – 3:46
2. "Live Tomorrow" – 3:09
3. "Blir galen" – 4:22
4. "Idiot" – 3:34
5. "Vart tog du vägen?" – 3:37
6. "Igen och igen" – 3:51
7. "Världen snurrar" – 3:51
8. "Ett hjärta" – 3:13
9. "The botten is nådd" – 3:48
10. "Nästa säsong" – 3:16

== Charts ==
Chart (2012)	Peak position
Sweden (Sverigetopplistan)	4
