= Han jobbar i affär =

Single by Lena Philipsson

from the album Jag ångrar ingenting
- Released: 30 November 2005
- Label: Sony Music Entertainment
- Songwriters: Anders Hansson, Orup

Lena Philipsson singles chronology
| "Unga pojkar & äldre män" (2005) | "Han jobbar i affär" (2005) | "Jag ångrar ingenting" (2006) |

"Han jobbar i affär" is a song performed by Lena Philipsson on the 2005 album "Jag ångrar ingenting". It was written by Anders Hansson and Orup.

== Single ==
The single was released on 30 November 2005, peaking at 9th position at the Swedish singles chart.

=== Single track listing ===
1. "Han jobbar i affär" - 3:50
2. "Han jobbar i affär" (instrumental version) - 3:48

== Chart performance ==
The song was tested for Svensktoppen, where it stayed for 16 weeks between 18 December 2005-, peaking at third position before leaving the chart.

The song was tested for Trackslistan, entering at 19th position on 17 December 2005, before being knocked out the next week.

=== Charts ===
| Chart (2005–2006) | Peak position |
|---|---|
| Sweden (Sverigetopplistan) | 9 |
