= Jag blir hellre jagad av vargar =

1987 single by Orup

Single by Orup

from the album Orup
- Language: Swedish
- English title: I'd rather be hunted down by wolves
- B-side: "Jag sitter och väntar på min älskling"
- Released: 6 August 1987
- Studio: Polar (Stockholm)
- Genre: Synth-pop
- Label: WEA
- Songwriter: Thomas Eriksson
- Producer: Anders Glenmark

Orup singles chronology
"Är du redo?" (1987)	"Jag blir hellre jagad av vargar" (1987)	"Stanna hos dej" (1988)

Music video
- "Jag blir hellre jagad av vargar" on YouTube

"Jag blir hellre jagad av vargar" (transl. "I'd rather be hunted down by wolves") is a song written and recorded by Orup, peaking at second position at the Swedish singles chart.

The song charted for four weeks at Trackslistan between 19 September-17 October 1987, peaking at 6th position. It also charted at Svensktoppen for 11 weeks between 18 October 1987-3 January 1988, peaking at second position.

== Charts ==
Chart (1987)	Peak position
Sweden (Sverigetopplistan)	4
