= Stjärnorna =

Stjärnorna may refer to:

- "Stjärnorna" (Lena Philipsson song)
- "Stjärnorna" (Marie Bergman and Roger Pontare song)
- Stjärnorna, the former name of the Swedish speedway team Rospiggarna
