= Nu när du gått =

2008 song by Swedish duo Lena + Orup

Single by Lena + Orup

from the album Dubbel
- Released: 17 September 2008
- Genre: Pop
- Length: 3:35
- Label: Roxy; Sony BMG
- Songwriters: Orup; Lena Philipsson
- Producer: Peter Månsson

Lena Philipsson singles chronology
"Det ringer på min dörr" (2006)	"Nu när du gått" (2008)	"Jag hatar att vakna utan dej" (2008)

Orup singles chronology
"Indiedrottning" (2007)	"Nu när du gått" (2008)	"Jag hatar att vakna utan dej" (2008)

"Nu när du gått" ("Now that you left") is a song by Swedish singers Lena Philipsson and Orup (as Lena + Orup) from their collaborative album Dubbel (2008). The song was released as the album's lead single on 17 September 2008 by Roxy and Sony BMG. It peaked at number one on the Sverigetopplistan singles chart.

== Chart performance ==
"Nu när du gått" debuted atop the Sverigetopplistan singles chart on 25 September 2008. It peaked at number one for two non-consecutive weeks and remained on the chart for a total of ten weeks. The song also peaked at number six on the Svensktoppen chart on 26 October 2008.

== Track listing ==
- CD single / digital download
1. "Nu när du gått" – 3:35

== Credits and personnel ==
Credits are adapted from the Dubbel liner notes.

- Petter Bergander – electric piano, organ, piano
- Eric Broheden – mastering
- Joakim Hemming – bass
- Ronny Lahti – mixing
- Peter Månsson – drums, keyboards, production, programming, recording
- Mikko Pavola – guitar
- Lena Philipsson – backing vocals, music
- Orup – backing vocals, lyrics, music, piano

== Charts ==
=== Weekly charts ===
Chart (2008)	Peak position
Sweden (Sverigetopplistan)	1

=== Year-end charts ===
Chart (2008)	Position
Sweden (Sverigetopplistan)	34

== Certifications ==
Region	Certification	Certified units/sales
Sweden (GLF)	Gold	10,000^{^}
^{^} Shipments figures based on certification alone.

== Release history ==
Country	Date	Format	Label	Ref.
Sweden	22 September 2008	Digital download	Roxy; Sony BMG	
Sweden	1 October 2008	CD single	Roxy; Sony BMG	

== See also ==
- List of number-one singles and albums in Sweden (2008)
