= Unga pojkar & äldre män =

2005 song by Swedish singer Lena Philipsson

Single by Lena Philipsson

from the album Jag ångrar ingenting
- Released: 21 September 2005
- Length: 3:58
- Label: Columbia; Sony BMG
- Songwriter: Orup
- Producer: Anders Hansson

Lena Philipsson singles chronology
"På gatan där jag bor" (2005)	"Unga pojkar & äldre män" (2005)	"Han jobbar i affär" (2005)

"Unga pojkar & äldre män" ("Young boys & older men") is a song by Swedish singer Lena Philipsson from her tenth studio album Jag ångrar ingenting (2005). Written by Orup and produced by Anders Hansson, the song was released as the album's lead single on 21 September 2005 through Columbia and Sony BMG. It peaked at number four on the Sverigetopplistan singles chart.

== Track listing ==
- CD single / digital download
1. "Unga pojkar & äldre män" – 3:58
2. "Unga pojkar & äldre män" (instrumental) – 4:31

== Credits and personnel ==
Credits are adapted from the Jag ångrar ingenting liner notes.

- Orup – music and lyrics
- Anders Hansson – production, recording
- Ronny Lahti – mixing
- Björn Engelmann – mastering

== Charts ==
=== Weekly charts ===
Chart (2005)	Peak position
Sweden (Sverigetopplistan)	4

=== Year-end charts ===
Chart (2005)	Position
Sweden (Sverigetopplistan)	63

== Release history ==
Country	Date	Format	Label	Ref.
Sweden	21 September 2005	CD single	Columbia; Sony BMG	
Sweden	21 September 2005	Digital download	Sony BMG	
