= Jag och min far =

Single by Olle Ljungström

from the album Det stora kalaset
- A-side: "Jag och min far"
- B-side: "Saker som jag samlat på"
- Released: 1997
- Label: Telegram
- Songwriter: Olle Ljungström

"Jag och min far" ("Me and my dad/father") is a song written and recorded by Olle Ljungström, and released as a single in 1997 as well as on his 1998 studio album Det stora kalaset. A music video was also directed.

Lyrically, it deals with memories from a son and his father, who has died. The song is not autobiographical in a literal sense; Ljungström's father was alive at the time, although the two had been out of touch for several years.

In 2008, it was recorded by Love Olzon on the tribute album Andra sjunger Olle Ljungström and by Pernilla Andersson on the album Gör dig till hund.

In 2012, Magnus Uggla performed the song in the third season of Så mycket bättre. Magnus Uggla's lyrics deal with him exchanging knowledge within different topics with his now deceased father.

His recording became a Svensktoppen hit, subsequently charting from 23 December 2012 until 17 January 2016, spending a total of 161 weeks on the chart. It also peaked at number two on the Swedish Singles Chart.

== Charts ==
=== Magnus Uggla recording ===
Chart (2012–2013)	Peak position
Sweden (Sverigetopplistan)	2
