= Fantasy (Lena Philipsson album) =

Studio album by Lena Philipsson
- Released: 1993
- Genre: Electronica
- Producer: Band of Gypsies

Lena Philipsson chronology
| A Woman's Gotta Do What a Woman's Gotta Do (1991) | Fantasy (1993) | Lena Philipsson (1994) |

Fantasy is an album released in 1993 by Swedish pop singer Lena Philipsson.

== Track listing ==
| No. | Title | Length |
|---|---|---|
| 1. | "Sensuality" | 3:54 |
| 2. | "Fantasy" | 4:18 |
| 3. | "Baby Baby Love" | 4:33 |
| 4. | "I'll be with You" | 4:55 |
| 5. | "Love is Just a Game" | 4:16 |
| 6. | "Take My Breath Away" | 3:59 |
| 7. | "Take Heart" | 4:11 |
| 8. | "For the Love of You" | 5:09 |
| 9. | "Give Me Your Love" | 3:40 |
| 10. | "Make it Right" | 5:21 |
