= Lena Philipsson (1995 album) =

Studio album by Lena Philipsson
- Released: 15 September 1995
- Recorded: 1994–1995
- Genre: Pop
- Length: 42 minutes

Lena Philipsson chronology
Lena Philipsson (1994)	Lena Philipsson (1995)	Bästa vänner (1997)

Lena Philipsson was released on 15 September 1995 and is an album from Swedish pop singer Lena Philipsson. Lena Philipsson and Torgny Söderberg wrote the songs. The album peaked at #10 at the Swedish album chart.

== Track listing ==
#	Title	Songwriter
1.	"Moder Swea"	Lena Philipsson, Torgny Söderberg
2.	"Kärlek kommer med sommar"	Lena Philipsson, Torgny Söderberg
3.	"London"	Lena Philipsson
4.	"Vila hos mig"	Lena Philipsson, Torgny Söderberg
5.	"Han är min"	Lena Philipsson, Torgny Söderberg
6.	"Vandra vid din sida"	Lena Philipsson, Torgny Söderberg
7.	"Månsken i augusti"	Lena Philipsson, Torgny Söderberg
8.	"Stjärnorna"	Lena Philipsson, Torgny Söderberg
9.	"Allting kommer tillbaka"	Lena Philipsson, Torgny Söderberg
10.	"Se det som det är"	Lena Philipsson
11.	"Underbar"	Lena Philipsson

== Contributing musicians ==
- Ulf Janson - guitar
- Figge Boström - bass
- Lasse Persson - drums

== Chart positions ==
Chart (1995)	Peak position
Sweden	10
