= Ellen Krauss =

Swedish singer

- Born: Ellen Sofie Elisabeth Krauss; 26 June 2000 (age 25); Vallentuna, Sweden
- Occupation: Singer
- Labels: Jubel Artist Agency

Ellen Sofie Elisabeth Krauss (born 26 June 2000) is a Swedish singer. In 2023, Krauss participated in Så mycket bättre which was broadcast on TV4. In 2018, Krauss was awarded the Rookie of the Year at Denniz Pop Awards. She is a lesbian.

== Discography ==
=== Albums ===
List of albums, with selected details and peak chart positions
Title	Details	Peak chart positions
Title	Details	SWE
Romeo	Released: 4 October 2024; Label: Universal Music Sweden; Formats: Digital download, streaming	11

=== Singles ===
List of singles, with selected peak chart positions
Title	Year	Peak chart positions	Album
Title	Year	SWE	Album
"Inatt (Ingen stoppar oss nu)"	2023	34	Non-album single
"Cherry on Top"	2024	— (Note: "Cherry on Top" did not enter the Swedish Singellista Chart, but peaked at number eight on the Swedish Heatseeker Chart.)	Romeo

=== Other charted songs ===
List of other charted songs, with selected peak chart positions
Title	Year	Peak chart positions	Album
Title	Year	SWE Heat.	Album
"Picking Up"	2024	9	Romeo
