= Lady Star =

Compilation album by Lena Philipsson
- Released: April 7, 2006
- Recorded: 1986–2001
- Genre: Pop

Lena Philipsson chronology
Jag ångrar ingenting (2005)	Lady Star (2006)	Lena 20 år (2007)

Lady Star was released on April 7, 2006 and is an album from Swedish pop singer Lena Philipsson.

== Track listing ==
1. "Juliette & Jonathan"
2. "Det är här jag har mitt liv"
3. "Stanna här hos mej"
4. "Vindarnas väg"
5. "Fly Me over the Rainbow"
6. "Jag sänder på min radio"
7. "Oskuldens ögon"
8. "Lady Star"
9. "Om kärleken är blind"
10. "Helene"
11. "Spell of Love"
12. "När jag behöver dig som mest"
13. "You Opened my Eyes"
14. "Om du ger upp"
15. "Kom"
