= Född i november =

2010 studio album by Orup

Studio album by Orup
- Released: 24 November 2010
- Studio: Studio Brun, Stockholm
- Genre: Pop
- Length: 37:27
- Label: Roxy
- Producer: Peter Kvint

Orup chronology
Dubbel (2008)	Född i november (2010)

Singles from Född i november
- 1. "Tiden bara gick" Released: 10 May 2010; 2. "Född i november" Released: 27 September 2010; 3. "Cigarettminut" Released: 10 January 2011; 4. "Huddinge" Released: 1 June 2011

Född i november is a 2010 studio album by Orup.

== Track listing ==
No.	Title	Writer(s)	Length
1.	"Cigarettminut"	Thomas Eriksson; Johan Kinde	5:11
2.	"Säg inte hans namn"	Eriksson	4:13
3.	"Huddinge"	Eriksson; Kinde	4:12
4.	"Jag borde fattat"	Eriksson	3:42
5.	"Född i november"	Eriksson; Kinde	4:32
6.	"Tiden bara gick"	Eriksson; Kinde	3:41
7.	"Jag var alltför ung"	Eriksson; Kinde	4:36
8.	"Inte mycket jag behöver"	Eriksson	3:33
9.	"Ett annorlunda liv"	Eriksson; Kinde	3:47
Total length:			37:27

== Personnel ==
- Orup — vocals, guitar, bass
- Rikard Nilsson — piano, organ
- Andreas Dahlbäck — drums
- Peter Kvint — bass, guitar, synthesizer, piano, steel guitar, percussion, producer

== Charts ==
=== Weekly charts ===
Chart (2010–2011)	Peak position
Swedish Albums (Sverigetopplistan)	3

=== Year-end charts ===
Chart (2010)	Peak position
Swedish Albums (Sverigetopplistan)	70
