= Faktiskt =

2006 studio album by Orup

Studio album by Orup
- Released: 15 November 2006
- Genre: Pop
- Length: 45:03
- Label: Roxy

Orup chronology
Elva hjärtan (2000)	Faktiskt (2006)	Dubbel (2008)

Singles from Faktiskt
- 1. "Måndag-Fredag" Released: October 2006; 2. "Sjung halleluja (och prisa Gud)" Released: December 2006; 3. "Indiedrottning" Released: February 2007

Faktiskt is the eight studio album by Swedish singer-songwriter Orup, released on 15 November 2006, by Roxy Recordings.

== Track listing ==
Faktiskt – Standard edition
No.	Title	Length
1.	"Måndag-Fredag"	3:47
2.	"Sjung halleluja (och prisa Gud)"	3:31
3.	"Tänk om jag dog i förrgår kväll?"	4:12
4.	"Indiedrottning"	3:53
5.	"Ett regnigt regn"	4:02
6.	"Med dej i mina tankar"	4:01
7.	"Någon måste gå"	4:27
8.	"Kläderna du bär"	4:01
9.	"Sibyllan"	5:10
10.	"Någon måste ha lagt nåt i min drink"	3:35
11.	"Du har så dålig smak (När det gäller män)"	4:24
Total length:		45:03

== Personnel ==
- Orup — vocals, guitar, keyboards, programming, composer, song lyricist, producer
- Anders Hansson — drums, percussion, keyboard, programming, producer
- Petter Gunnarsson — bass
- Staffan Astner — guitar
- Per Adebratt — keyboard, programming, producer

== Charts ==
Weekly chart performance for Faktiskt
Chart (2006)	Peak position
Swedish Albums (Sverigetopplistan)	2
