= Stockholm (song) =

Single by Orup

from the album Stockholm och andra ställen
- A-side: "Stockholm"
- B-side: "Stockholm" (Classic rock)
- Released: 1992
- Genre: pop
- Label: Metronome
- Songwriter: Orup
- Producer: Lennart Östlund

Orup singles chronology
"(If They Say) It's a Wonderful World" (1991)	"Stockholm" (1992)	"Nån annan kommer följa dig hem" (1992)

"Stockholm" is a 1992 single released by Orup also appearing on his album Stockholm & andra ställen the same year.

== Music video ==
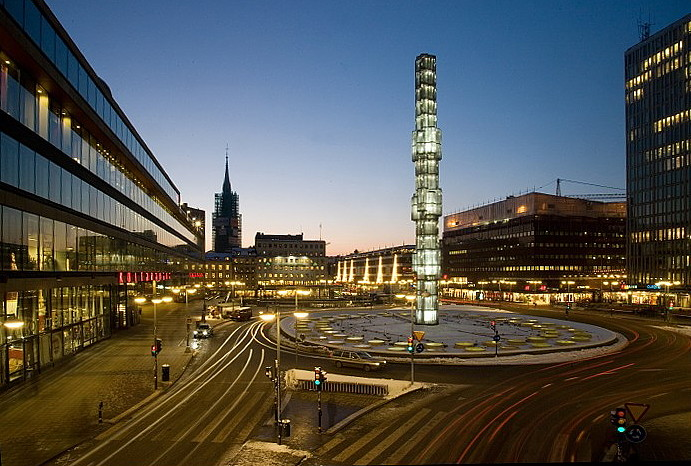
The glass obelisk Kristallvertikalaccent in Sergels Torg

In the music video, Orup travels by taxicab. The video contains Stockholm landmarks such as Kristallvertikalaccent and Svampen.

== Charts ==
Chart (1992)	Peak position
Sweden (Sverigetopplistan)	1
