= Orup (album) =

1988 studio album by Orup

Studio album by Orup
- Released: 11 January 1988
- Studio: Polar (Stockholm)
- Genre: Synth-pop
- Length: 41:15
- Label: WEA
- Producer: Anders Glenmark

Orup chronology
Orup (1988)	Orup 2 (1989)

Singles from Orup
- 1. "Är du redo?" Released: 1987; 2. "Jag blir hellre jagad av vargar" Released: 6 August 1987; 3. "Stanna hos dej" Released: 1988; 4. "Min mor sa till mej" Released: 1988

Orup is the debut studio album by Swedish musician Orup, released on 11 January 1988.

== Track listing ==
All songs written by Orup, except where noted.

Side one
No.	Title	Writer(s)	Length
1.	"Baby!"		3:18
2.	"När ska jag få veta?"	Thomas Eriksson; Anders Glenmark	3:38
3.	"Ingen annan man"		4:38
4.	"Jag blir hellre jagad av vargar"		3:46
5.	"Jag vågar inte sova längre"		3:59
Total length:			19:19

Side one
No.	Title	Length
1.	"Stanna hos dej"	3:27
2.	"Rika flicka"	3:24
3.	"Min mor sa till mej"	3:59
4.	"Du är i himmelen"	4:13
5.	"Är du redo?"	3:10
6.	"Från Djursholm till Danvikstull"	3:43
Total length:		21:56

== Charts ==
Chart (1988)	Peak position
Swedish Albums (Sverigetopplistan)	1

== Certifications and sales ==
Region	Certification	Certified units/sales
Sweden (GLF)	Gold	50,000^{^}
^{^} Shipments figures based on certification alone.
