= Det gör ont en stund på natten men inget på dan =

Studio album by Lena Philipsson
- Released: August 4, 2004
- Recorded: 2004
- Genre: Pop
- Label: Columbia

Lena Philipsson chronology
Bästa vänner (1997)	Det gör ont en stund på natten men inget på dan (2004)	Jag ångrar ingenting (2005)

Singles from Det gör ont en stund på natten men inget på dan
- 1. "Det gör ont" Released: 17 March 2004; 2. "Delirium" Released: 7 July 2004; 3. "Lena Anthem" Released: 11 October 2004; 4. "På gatan där jag bor" Released: 5 January 2005

Det gör ont en stund på natten men inget på dan (It Hurts for a While at Night But Not at All by Day) is a studio album by Swedish pop singer Lena Philipsson, led by the first single and number one hit "Det gör ont" ("It Hurts"), which won Melodifestivalen 2004. The album was released on 4 August 2004, debuting at No. 1 in Sweden, and not falling until a few weeks thereafter. In 2005, more than 120,000 copies of the album had been sold, granting it a double-platinum certification.

== Track listing ==
1. "Lena Anthem" – 4:16
2. "Det nya Europa" – 4:31
3. "Låt oss säga vi var gifta" – 4:34
4. "Det gör ont" – 3:06
5. "På gatan där jag bor" – 4:15
6. "Stopp! Nej! Gå härifrån!" – 3:27
7. "Delirium" – 4:29
8. "Ingenting är längre som förut" – 4:01
9. "Min mor sa till mig" – 4:24
10. "Säg det som det är" – 4:10
11. "Den dröm som alla drömmar drömmer" – 3:13

== Charts ==
Chart (2004–2005)	Peak position
Swedish Albums (Sverigetopplistan)	1
