= Dansa i neon =

Studio album by Lena Philipsson
- Released: 15 May 1987
- Genre: Pop

Lena Philipsson chronology
Kärleken är evig (1986)	Dansa i neon (1987)	Boy (1987)

Dansa i neon was released on 15 May 1987 and is an album from Swedish pop singer Lena Philipsson. The album peaked at number 19 at the Swedish Albums Chart.

== Track listing ==
1. "Saknar dej innan du går"
2. "Dansa i neon"
3. "Du är mitt liv"
4. "Regn faller"
5. "Den ende"
6. "Cheerio"
7. "Sommartid"
8. "Åh, vad jag längtar"
9. "Kom du av dej"
10. "Om jag fick"
11. "Säg det nu"
12. "Det går väl an"
13. "Kärleken är evig"
14. "Jag känner"
15. "Jag sänder på min radio"
16. "Löpa linan ut"

== Charts ==
Chart (1986)	Peak position
Sweden (Sverigetopplistan)	9
