= A Woman's Gotta Do What a Woman's Gotta Do =

Studio album by Lena Philipsson
- Released: 1 April 1991
- Genre: Pop

Lena Philipsson chronology
My Name (1989)	A Woman's Gotta Do What a Woman's Gotta Do (1991)	Fantasy (1993)

A Woman's Gotta Do What a Woman's Gotta Do was released on 1 April 1991 and is an album and a show with Swedish pop singer Lena Philipsson. The album peaked at #7 at the Swedish album chart.

The album is based on a stage show by the same title, directed and choreographed by Hans Marklund at Hamburger Börs in Stockholm 1990 and even televised by Swedish TV 4. Lena Philipsson played the lead as "Agent 006" (6 is pronounced sex in Swedish) in this James Bond-associated girl power entertainment show. Philipsson has also written all songs on the album, except for the songs "The Trap", "Hard to Be a Lover", "A Woman's Gotta Do What a Woman's Gotta Do", "The Preacher" and "The Escape" that are co-written together with Torgny Söderberg. The album is a concept album about this fictional agents adventures.

== Track listing ==
1. "Intro" 0:47
2. "006" - 4:22
3. "Macho Male" – 3:43
4. "The Trap" – 3:43
5. "The Murder" – 3:44
6. "Only an Angel Can Lie" – 4:24
7. "Flesh and Blood" – 4:27
8. "Baby Be Mine" – 5:07 (duet with Nils Landgren)
9. "Hard to Be a Lover" – 4:19
10. "A Woman's Gotta Do What a Woman's Gotta Do" – 4:02
11. "Story" - 0:35
12. "The Preacher" – 3:44
13. "The Escape" – 3:55
14. "Are You in or Are You Out" – 4:32
15. "New World" – 3:44

== Chart positions ==
Chart (1991)	Peak position
Sweden	7
