= LA Run =

"L.A. Run"

Song by Carvells
- Language: English
- Genre: popular music
- Songwriters: Alan Carvell, Brian O Shea

L.A. Run is a song written and composed by Alan Carvell and Brian O Shea, and recorded by the Carvells in 1977 which reached number 31 in the UK charts in November of the same year. The song is about the then-new craze of Skateboarding which had crossed-over from the US to the UK that same year.

With new lyrics in Swedish by Björn Håkanson and Stefan Schröder as Skateboard, Magnum Bonum scored a 1978 success with the song.

== Charts ==
=== Carvell's version ===
Chart (1977)	Peak position
UK Singles Chart	31

=== Magnum Bonum version ===
Chart (1978–1979)	Peak position
Sweden (Sverigetopplistan)	1
