= Kärleken är evig =

Studio album by Lena Philipsson
- Released: 21 April 1986
- Recorded: Spring 1986
- Studio: KMH Studios
- Genre: Pop
- Label: Mariann Grammofon
- Producer: Rutger Gunnarsson, Torgny Söderberg

Lena Philipsson chronology
Kärleken är evig (1986)	Dansa i neon (1987)

Kärleken är evig is the debut studio album from Swedish pop singer Lena Philipsson, released in 1986. The album peaked at number 20 on the Swedish Albums Chart.

== Track listing ==
1. "Kärleken är evig" (Per Gessle, Torgny Söderberg)
2. "Åh Amadeus" (Fredrik Hansson, Per-Olof Thyrén)
3. "Det är här jag har mitt liv" (Söderberg, Ingela Forsman)
4. "Stanna här hos mej" (Charlie Skarbek, L. Berg, Tim Smit)
5. "Vindarnas väg" (Peter Åhs)
6. "Jag sänder på min radio" (Gessle, Philipsson)
7. "Jag känner" (Sergio Cossu, Salvatore Stellita, Jacob Dahlin, Carlo Marrale)
8. "Oskuldens ögon" (Forsman, J. Tcharnavskij, Leonid Derbenjov)
9. "Om kärleken är blind" (Forsman, Anders Glenmark)
10. "Löpa linan ut" (Forsman, Benny Borg, OV Lien, Peter Knutsen)
11. "Segla" (Phillipsson, Monica Forsberg)
12. "Helene" (Forsman, Mary Susan Applegate, Tony Hendrik, Karin van Haaren)

== Charts ==
Chart (1986)	Peak position
Sweden (Sverigetopplistan)	20
