= Jag ångrar ingenting =

Studio album by Lena Philipsson
- Released: October 26, 2005
- Recorded: 2005
- Genre: Pop
- Label: Columbia

Lena Philipsson chronology
Det gör ont en stund på natten men inget på dan (2004)	Jag ångrar ingenting (2005)	Lady Star (2006)

Jag ångrar ingenting is the tenth studio album from Swedish pop singer Lena Philipsson, released in 2005. Introduced with the singles "Unga pojkar och äldre män" and "Han jobbar i affär", the album was released on October 26. On the Swedish Albums Chart, it debuted at number three, repeating that position the next week and rising up to number two during the third. The album was certified Platinum (60,000 copies) on December 13, 2005.

== Track listing ==
1. "Jag ångrar ingenting"
2. "Unga pojkar & äldre män"
3. "Han jobbar i affär"
4. "Dom bjuder på champagne"
5. "Jag sover hellre ensam"
6. "Du ringer bara när du är full"
7. "Det ringer på min dörr"
8. "Den högste"
9. "Någon annanstans"
10. "Du kan få mig när du vill"

== Singles from the album ==
- 2005 – "Unga pojkar & äldre män", No. 4
- 2005 – "Han jobbar i affär", No. 9
- 2006 – "Jag ångrar ingenting"
- 2006 – "Det ringer på min dörr"
