= Magnum Bonum =

Pop group in Huddinge, Sweden

- Origin: Huddinge, Sweden
- Years active: 1970's-80's

Magnum Bonum was a pop group from Huddinge in Sweden, scoring several chart successes in Sweden during the 1970s and 80's. Famous songs are Skateboard (LA Run), Marie, Lover Boy, Vi vill ha mer, Hög hatt and Digital panik.
