= Bästa vänner =

Studio album by Lena Philipsson
- Released: 1997
- Genre: Soul pop
- Label: EMI

Lena Philipsson chronology
Lena Philipsson (1995)	Bästa vänner (1997)	Hennes bästa (1998)

Bästa vänner is a 1997 album from Swedish pop singer Lena Philipsson. This album is a soul pop album.

== Track listing ==
All songs composed by Philipsson.

1. "Ingenting att va rädd för"
2. "Tänk om jag aldrig mer"
3. "Av och på"
4. "Kvinnan jag vet han vill ha"
5. "Bästa vänner"
6. "[outro]"
7. "Måndag tisdag"
8. "Vi ses igen framöver"
9. "[intro]"
10. "En annan man"
11. "Havet"

== Contributing musicians ==
- Lena Philipsson - keyboards, grand piano, vocals, percussion
- Mattias Torell - guitar
- Martin Jonsson - drums
- Lounge - programming
