= It Hurts (Lena Philipsson song) =

2004 single by Lena Philipsson

Single by Lena Philipsson

from the album Det gör ont en stund på natten men inget på dan
- Released: 17 March 2004
- Genre: Pop; dance-pop; Eurodance; Swedish Schlager
- Length: 3:00
- Label: Columbia
- Songwriter: Thomas Eriksson
- Producer: Anders Hansson

Lena Philipsson singles chronology
"Spell of Love" / "Lady Star" (2001)	"It Hurts" / "Det gör ont" (2004)	"Delirium" (2004)

Eurovision Song Contest 2004 entry
- Country: Sweden
- Artist: Lena Philipsson
- Language: English
- Composer: Thomas Eriksson
- Lyricist: Thomas Eriksson

Finals performance
- Final result: 5th
- Final points: 170

Entry chronology
- ◄ "Give Me Your Love" (2003)
- "Las Vegas" (2005) ►

"It Hurts" is a song recorded by Swedish singer Lena Philipsson. It was written by Thomas "Orup" Eriksson and produced by Anders Hansson for Philipsson's studio album Det gör ont en stund på natten men inget på dan (2004). It is the best known as the winning song of Melodifestivalen 2004, where it was performed in Swedish as "Det gör ont" (Swedish pronunciation: [deː jœːr ˈʊnːt]; "It Hurts"), and as Sweden's entry at the Eurovision Song Contest 2004, where it finished in fifth place with 170 points.

== Melodifestivalen ==
Philipsson had previously entered Melodifestivalen, the Swedish national selection for the Eurovision Song Contest, in 1986, 1987 and 1988, finishing in second, fifth and second place, respectively. She also competed in 1991 and in 1999 as a songwriter.

In 2004, Philipsson entered Melodifestivalen for the fourth time as a performer, with "Det gör ont", written by Orup. She first performed in the semi-final four at the Malmömässan in Malmö and qualified for the final with a total of 134,189 votes. Philipsson then went on to win the final at the Globen in Stockholm, having received most points from both the jury and the televote.

== Eurovision Song Contest ==
Since Sweden had placed fifth in the Eurovision Song Contest 2003, Philipsson qualified directly to the final of the 2004 contest, held in Istanbul, Turkey. She performed at the 24th position—the last in the final—and eventually placed fifth with 170 points. Philipsson performed "It Hurts", the English-language version of the song, at Eurovision.

== Commercial performance ==
The Swedish-language version of the song reached number-one on both Svensktoppen and Sverigetopplistan, and was certified platinum. Following the Eurovision Song Contest, the English-language version charted in Belgium and Turkey.

== Track listing ==
"Det gör ont"

1. "Det gör ont" — 3:00
2. "Det gör ont (Instrumental)" — 3:00

"It Hurts"

1. "It Hurts" — 3:00
2. "It Hurts (Instrumental)" — 3:00

== Charts and certifications ==
=== Chart positions ===
Chart	Peak position
Belgium (Flanders Ultratop)	38
Sweden (Svensktoppen)	1
Sweden (Sverigetopplistan)	1
Sweden (Trackslistan)	1
Turkey (Turkish Music Charts)	6

=== Certifications ===
Region	Certification	Certified units/sales
Sweden (GLF)	Platinum	20,000^{^}
^{^} Shipments figures based on certification alone.

== Cover versions ==
- Finnish musician M.A. Numminen covered the song in 2008.
- Taiwanese pop singer Jolin Tsai covered the single under the title "Slow Life" for the 2009 album Butterfly.
