= Månsken i augusti =

Single by Lena Philipsson

from the album Lena Philipsson
- Released: 1994
- Songwriters: Lena Philipsson, Torgny Söderberg

Lena Philipsson singles chronology
"Baby Baby Love" (1993)	"Månsken i augusti" (1994)	"Kärlek kommer med sommar"/"Vila hos mig" (1995)

"Månsken i augusti", written by Torgny Söderberg and Lena Philipsson, is a song recorded by Lena Philipsson for her 1995 eponymous album.

== Single ==
The single was released in mid-1994, peaking at 38th position at the Swedish singles chart, and becoming a radio hit.

The song was also tested for Svensktoppen, where it stayed for 10 weeks during the period 6 August-8 October 1994, peaking at 5th position. The song was also tested for Tracks listan, where it stayed for one week, on 6 August 1994.

== Other recordings ==
With lyrics in English by Torgny Söderberg, Christer Sjögren recorded the song on his 1996 album Varför är solen så röd as "Crying in the Moonlight". Arto Nuotio recorded the song in 1998 with lyrics in Finnish, as "Kuutamoisin illoin". In 1999 Paula Koivuniemi recorded the song with other lyrics in Finnish, as "Itken kuutamoon".

Umberto Marcato recorded the song in Italian, as "Giovedi D'agosto".

== Charts ==
Chart (1994)	Peak position
Sweden (Sverigetopplistan)	38
