= Dubbel (album) =

Studio album by Lena Philipsson & Orup
- Released: November 12, 2008
- Genre: Pop
- Length: 36 minutes
- Label: Roxy Recordings

Lena Philipsson & Orup chronology
Dubbel (2008)	Född i november (2010)

Dubbel is a 2008 studio album by Lena Philipsson & Orup and part of their cooperation-project Lena + Orup. They have written the songs alone.

The songs "Nu när du gått" and "Fem minuter i himmelen" charted at Svensktoppen, where they both stayed for three weeks, "Nu när du gått" between 26 October-9 November 2008 and "Fem minuter i himmelen" between 15 -29 March 2009.

In 2010, the song "Fem minuter i himmelen" was recorded by Torgny Melins and Melissa Williams on the album Dansbandsnatt.

== Track listing ==
1. "Hals över huvud" – 3:38
2. "Nu när du gått" – 3:35
3. "Fotbollsstjärna" – 2:47
4. "Jag hatar att vakna utan dej" – 3:35
5. "1 skäl" – 4:07
6. "Fem minuter i himmelen" – 3:22
7. "Bara en polis" – 3:45
8. "Jag måste skynda mig på" – 4:00
9. "Så mycket bättre än dom andra" – 3:59
10. "Blott en skugga" – 2:39

== Contributors ==
- Lena Philipsson — vocals
- Orup — vocals, piano, keyboards, bass, guitar
- Peter Månsson — keyboards, piano, organ, guitar, bass, programming, drums, percussion
- Joakim Hemming — bass, guitar
- Petter Bergander — piano, organ

== Charts ==
Chart (2008)	Peak position
Swedish Albums (Sverigetopplistan)	2
