= Stjärnorna (Lena Philipsson song) =

Single by Lena Philipsson

from the album Lena Philipsson
- A-side: "Stjärnorna"
- B-side: "Allting kommer tillbaka"
- Released: 1995
- Genre: schlager
- Songwriters: Lena Philipsson, Torgny Söderberg

Lena Philipsson singles chronology
""Kärlek kommer med sommar"/Vila hos mig"" (1995)	"Stjärnorna" (1995)	""Moder Swea"/"Underbar"" (1995)

"Stjärnorna", written by Lena Philipsson and Torgny Söderberg, is a song performed by Lena Philipsson on her 1995 album Lena Philipsson. The song also appeared as film music for the 1995 film En på miljonen.

== Single ==
The single peaked at 29th position at the Swedish singles chart.

The song was also tested for Svensktoppen, where it stayed for 10 weeks between 7 October-9 December, peaking at 2nd position.

== Other recordings ==
With lyrics in Finnish, as Tähtien katse, Arja Koriseva recorded the song in 1995.

== Charts ==
Chart (1995)	Peak position
Sweden (Sverigetopplistan)	29
