= Om igen =

Single by Lena Philipsson

from the album Talking in Your Sleep
- A-side: "Om igen"
- B-side: "Vem skall sova över"
- Released: 1988
- Genre: Schlager
- Label: Big Bag
- Songwriters: Ingela 'Pling' Forsman; Bobby Ljunggren

Lena Philipsson singles chronology
"I'm a Fool"/"Teach Me Tiger" (1987)	"Om igen" (1988)	"Talking in Your Sleep"/"I varje spegel" (1998)

"Om igen", written by Ingela 'Pling' Forsman and Bobby Ljunggren, is a ballad in Swedish, performed by Swedish pop singer Lena Philipsson at the Swedish Melodifestivalen 1988. "Om igen" finished second.

The single peaked at #10 at the Swedish singles chart. The song was also at Svensktoppen for 12 weeks during the period 10 April-4 September 1988, with a second place during the debut week as best result there.

The song won the 1988 Second Chance Contest.

Kikki Danielsson was asked to compete with "Om igen", but said no.

== Chart positions ==
Chart (1988)	Peak position
Sweden	10
