= Lena Philipsson =

Swedish singer, songwriter and media personality (born 1966)

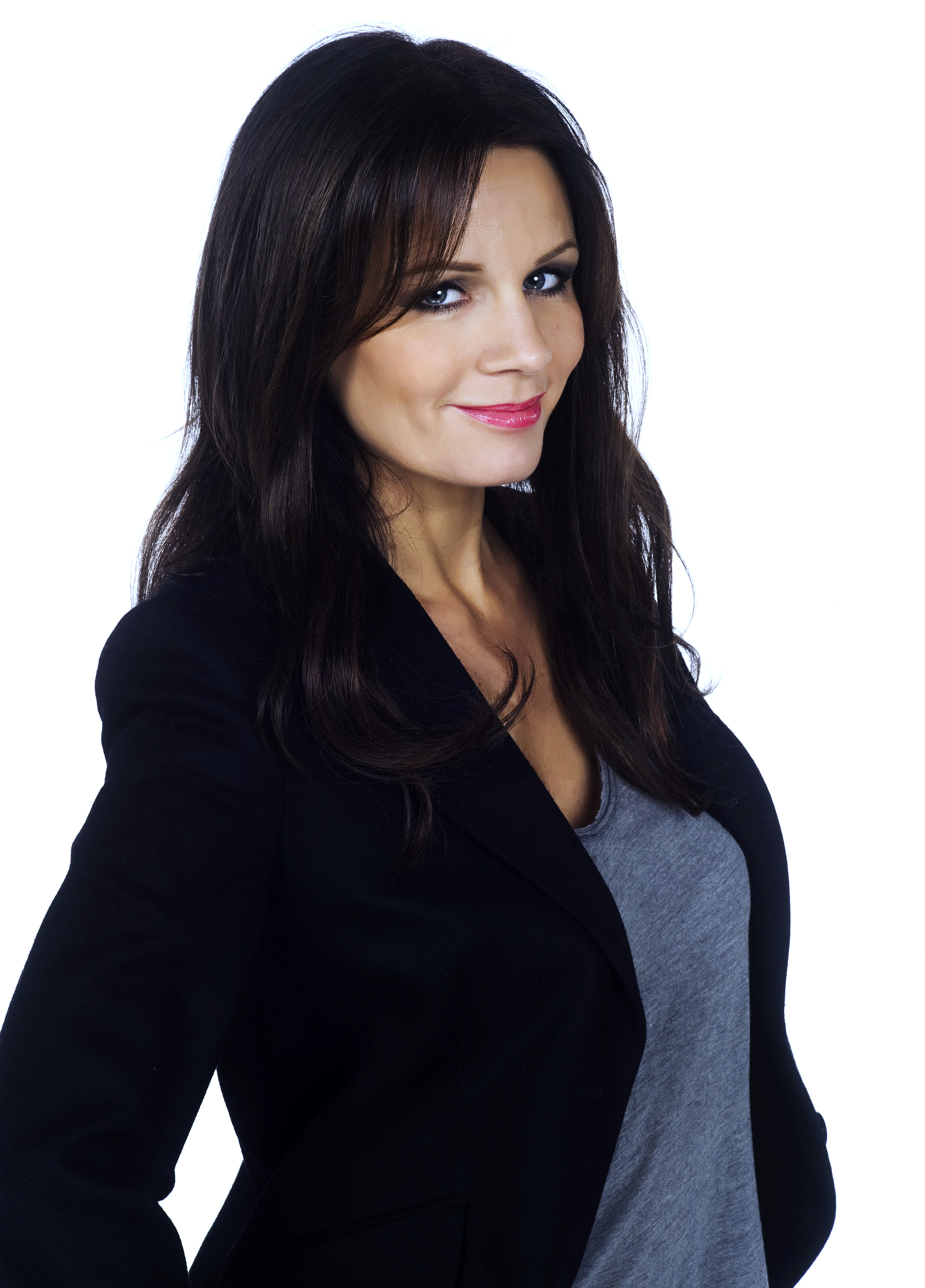
- Philipsson in November 2012
- Born: Maria Magdalena Filipsson; 19 January 1966 (age 60); Vetlanda, Sweden
- Occupations: Singer; songwriter; media personality
- Years active: 1984–present
- Musical career
- Genres: Pop; schlager
- Instruments: Vocals; keyboards
- Label: Sony
- Website: lenaphilipsson.se

Maria Magdalena Filipsson (born 19 January 1966), known by her stage name Lena Philipsson (Swedish pronunciation: [ˈlêːna ˈfîːlɪpˌsɔn]), is a Swedish singer, songwriter and media personality. She represented Sweden in the Eurovision Song Contest 2004, finishing fifth. In 2024, Philipsson was hired by Per Gessle as the female vocalist for Roxette's 2025 tour.

== Career ==
Philipsson was born in Vetlanda, Sweden. She participated in the Swedish New Faces in 1982. Her career started with the single "Boy/You Open My Eyes" in 1984 and with her entries at Melodifestivalen in 1986, 1987 and 1988. In 1987, she released the song "Aquarius 99", a duet with the Russian composer Igor Nikolaev. In 1989, she had great success with the album My Name, which included top hits "Standing in My Rain", "Why", and "Leave a Light". In 1991, she recorded a concept album and show about a female secret agent, Agent 006. In the early 1990s, her fame increased in Sweden, and she continued to release albums until 1997. In 2001, she had a stage comeback; the Lena Philipsson Show was sold out for two and a half years around Sweden. In 2004, she returned after a seven-year hiatus from the album charts.

In 2004, she entered Melodifestivalen for the fourth time as a solo artist, with "Det gör ont". She made it through the semifinal process and emerged as the winner on 20 March 2004, going on to represent Sweden at the Eurovision Song Contest 2004 with the translated English-language version "It Hurts". The song, composed by Thomas Eriksson (Orup), combined up-tempo and disco themes. Philipsson's stage appearance caused much controversy in the Swedish press and media because her performance, in a short fuchsia pink dress and high heels, consisted of dancing with the microphone stand in a fashion similar to Aerosmith's Steven Tyler.

Despite being the third favourite to win the competition, she finished in joint 5th place. The album, Det gör ont en stund på natten men inget på dan, went gold in nine days, with "Det gör ont" as its lead single. It also spawned the singles "Delirium", "Lena Anthem" and "På gatan där jag bor".

The Swedish radio show Tracks voted her best female artist, best Swedish artist, and artist of the year for 2004, and "Det gör ont" was voted best song.

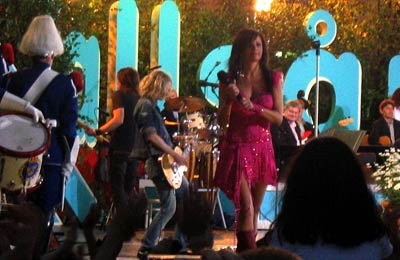
Philipsson onstage in 2004

She released her new album Jag ångrar ingenting in 2005. After one day in the Swedish shops, it had sold over 30,000 copies. A one-hour TV special featuring new songs as well as old hits and some interviews aired in November the same year. In January 2006, Philipsson announced she was to host the 2006 Melodifestivalen. Because Melodifestivalen is a family show, her appearance as host was met with some controversy due to numerous jokes considered inappropriate for the audience.

In early 2007, she released her new version of her greatest hits, Lena 20 år. The album included hits from all her albums except from Fantasy. Also included was a new song "Jag måste skynda mig på". Lena and Orup set up their own show at China Teatern in Stockholm at the same time as the album release. The show was a critical and public success. Over 113,000 saw it in 2007, and there was a new premiere of the show in Gothenburg in early 2008. After its success in Stockholm and Gothenburg, the show Lena+Orup went on tour across Sweden late 2008. At the same time, Lena and Orup recorded a duet album called Dubbel, released in November.

Although she sewed her own stage clothes during her early career, she has said that she no longer has the time. In the early 1990s, she was one of three pop stars who were portrayed on stamps in Sweden; the others were Roxette and Jerry Williams. In the 1980s, she sang a duet on TV with American singer Michael Bolton.

On 2 May 2024, Roxette founder Per Gessle announced Philipsson as the band's new female vocalist, replacing the late Marie Fredriksson. The duo toured in South Africa, Australia and Europe from February 2025.

== Melodifestivalen ==
Philipsson has participated in Melodifestivalen, the Swedish pre-selection for the Eurovision Song Contest, six times: four times as a performer and twice as a songwriter.

- As a performer
  - 1986, "Kärleken är evig" ("Love Is Eternal") – 2nd
  - 1987, "Dansa i neon" ("Dancing in Neon") – 5th
  - 1988, "Om igen" ("Yet again") – 2nd
  - 2004, "Det gör ont" ("It Hurts") – Winner
- As a songwriter
  - 1991, "Tvillingsjäl" ("Soulmate") – performed by Pernilla Wahlgren
  - 1999, "Det svär jag på" ("I Swear") – performed by Arvingarna, 3rd

== Discography ==
=== Studio albums ===
Chart placings below are from Sverigetopplistan, the official Swedish top 60 singles and top 60 albums charts.

- 13 Lena Philippson albums, including one with Orup and two compilations, have reached the Swedish top 20.
- 16 singles have reached the Swedish top 60 (11 top 20), including both Swedish and English versions of Det gör ont.

Album Information
Kärleken är evig
- Released: 1986
- Producer: Torgny Söderberg & Rutger Gunnarsson
- Label: Mariann Records
- Chart positions: #20
- Singles:
  - 1986 "Kärleken är evig" #6
  - 1986 "Åh Amadeus"
  - 1986 "Jag känner"
Dansa i neon
- Released: 13 April 1987
- Producer: –
- Label: Mariann Records
- Chart positions: #19
- Singles:
  - 1987 "Dansa i neon" #9
  - 1987 "Cheerio"
  - 1987 "Saknar dig innan du går"
  - 1987 "Den ende"
Talking in Your Sleep
- Released: 5 May 1988
- Producer: –
- Label: Sony Music Entertainment
- Chart positions: #9
- Certification:Gold (+ 50 000)
- Singles:
  - 1987 "I'm a Fool/Teach Me Tiger"
  - 1988 "Om igen" #10
  - 1988 "Talking in Your Sleep"
  - 1988 "I varje spegel/Ain't It Just the Way"
My Name
- Released: 1989
- Producer: Torgny Söderberg & Lena Philipsson
- Label: Sony Music Entertainment
- Chart positions: #10
- Certification:2× Platinum (+ 130 000)
- Singles:
  - 1989 "Tänd ett ljus" #12
  - 1989 "Standing in My Rain/Blue Jeans"
  - 1990 "Why"
A Woman's Gotta Do What a Woman's Gotta Do
- Released: 10 April 1991
- Producer: –
- Label: Sony Music Entertainment
- Chart positions: #7
- Certification: Gold(+ 56 000)
- Singles:
  - 1991 "The Escape"
  - 1991 "006/Hard to be a Lover"
  - 1991 "The Preacher"
  - 1992 "Are You In or Are You Out?"
Fantasy
- Released: 1993
- Producer: Torgny Söderberg och Rutger Gunnarsson
- Label: Sony Music Entertainment
- Chart positions: –
- Singles:
  - 1993 "Fantasy"
  - 1993 "Give Me Your Love"
  - 1993 "Baby Baby Love"
Lena Philipsson
- Released: 22 November 1995
- Producer: Torgny Söderberg och Rutger Gunnarsson
- Label: Sony Music Entertainment
- Chart positions: #10
- Singles:
  - 1994 "Månsken i augusti" #38
  - 1995 "Kärlek kommer med sommar"
  - 1995 "Stjärnorna" #29
  - 1995 "Moder Swea"
Bästa vänner
- Released: 1997
- Producer: –
- Label: EMI
- Chart positions: –
- Singles:
  - 1997 "Bästa vänner"
  - 1997 "Tänk om jag aldrig mer"
  - 1997 "Av och på"
Det gör ont en stund på natten men inget på dan
- Released: 4 August 2004
- Producer: Anders Hansson
- Label: Columbia
- Chart positions: #1
- Certification: 2× Platinum (+120.000)
- Singles:
  - 2004 "Det gör ont" #1 (spent seven weeks at #1)
  - 2004 "Delirium" #5
  - 2004 "Lena Anthem" #4
  - 2004 "På gatan där jag bor" #26
Jag ångrar ingenting
- Released: 26 October 2005
- Producer: Anders Hansson
- Label: Columbia
- Chart positions: #2
- Certification: Platinum (+60.000)
- Singles:
  - 2005 "Unga pojkar & äldre män" #4
  - 2005 "Han jobbar i affär" #9
  - 2006 "Jag ångrar ingenting"
  - 2006 "Det ringer på min dörr"
Lena and Orup: Dubbel
- Released: 12 November 2008
- Producer: Anders Hansson, Peter Månsson
- Label:
- Chart positions: #2
- Certification: Platinum (+60.000)
- Singles:
  - 2008 "Nu när du gått" #1
  - 2009 "Fem minuter i himlen"
Världen snurrar
- Released: 15 February 2012
- Producer:
- Label: Universal Music Sweden
- Chart positions: #4
- Singles:
  - 2012 "Du följer väl med?"
Jag är ingen älskling
- Released: 19 September 2015
- Producer:
- Label: Universal Music Sweden
- Chart positions: #4
Maria Magdalena
- Released: 5 June 2020
- Producer:
- Label: Universal Music Sweden
- Chart Positions: #6

- 2001 single "Spell of Love" reached #53
- 2004 single "It Hurts" (English version of "Det gör ont") reached #4
- 2011 single "Dancing in the Neon Light" featuring Dead by April (English version of "Dansa i neon") reached #50

=== Other albums ===
- Boy (1987)
- Hitlåtar med Lena Philipsson 1985–1987 (1988)
- Lena Philipsson (1994)
- Hennes bästa (1998)
- Lena Philipsson Collection 1984–2001 (2001) – (reached #13 in the Swedish chart)
- 100% Lena/20 hits (2002)
- Lady Star (2006)
- Lena 20 år (2007) – (reached #2 in the Swedish chart)

=== Singles ===
- "Boy" / "You Open My Eyes" (as Lea, 1984)
- "Kärleken är evig" / "Om kärleken är blind" (1986)
- "Åh Amadeus" (1986)
- "Jag känner" (1986)
- "Dansa i neon" (1987)
- "Cheerio" / "Det går väl an" (1987)
- "Saknar dig innan du går" (1987)
- "Den ende" (1987)
- "I'm a Fool" / "Teach Me Tiger" (1987)
- "Om igen" / "Vem skall sova över" (1988)
- "Talking in Your Sleep" (1988)
- "I varje spegel" / "Ain't it Just the Way" (1988)
- "Tänd ett ljus" / "What Can I Do?" (1989)
- "Standing in My Rain" / "Blue Jeans" (1989)
- "Why (Så lätt kommer du inte undan)" / "Strong Man" (1989)
- "Blue Jeans" / "How Does It Feel" (1990)
- "The Escape" (1991)
- "006" / "Hard to Be a Lover" (1991)
- "The Preacher" (1991)
- "Are You in or are You Out" (1992)
- "Fantasy" (as Lena Philipson, 1993)
- "Give Me Your Love" (as Lena Philipson, 1993)
- "Baby Baby Love" (as Lena Philipson,1993)
- "Månsken i augusti" (as Lena Philipssson, 1994)
- "Kärlek kommer med sommar" / "Vila hos mig" (1995)
- "Stjärnorna" (1995)
- "Moder Swea" / "Underbar" (1995)
- "Bästa vänner" (1997)
- "Tänk om jag aldrig mer" (1997)
- "I Believe in Miracles" (2000) (radio)
- "Fly Me Over the Rainbow" (2001) (radio)
- "Spell of Love" / "Lady Star" (2001)
- "Det gör ont" (2004)
- "Delirium" (2004)
- "Lena Anthem" (2004)
- "På gatan där jag bor" (2005)
- "Unga pojkar & äldre män" (2005)
- "Han jobbar i affär" (2005)
- "Jag ångrar ingenting" (2006)
- "Det ringer på min dörr" (2006)
- "Nu när du gått" (with Orup) (2008)
- "Fem minuter i himlen" (with Orup) (2009)
- "Dancing in the Neon Light" (with Dead By April) (2011)
- "Idiot" (2011)
- "Live Tomorrow" (2011)
- "Galen" (2018)
- "Maria Magdalena" (2019)
- "Du ljuger" (2019)
- "Du är aldrig ensam" (2019)
- "Sällskapssjuk" (with Per Gessle) (2024)
- “Bad Blood” (with Per Gessle) (2025)

=== Other appearances ===
- Schlagertimmen (1986)
- Jacobs stege (1988) performing "Aquarius" with Igor Nikolayev
- Melodifestival special (1999)
- Barn 2000 (2000)
- Schooldays (2000)
- Livet är en schlager soundtrack (2000)
- Kopparbärs-Rock Vol.5 (2001)
- Melodifestivalen 2003 (as co-host) (2003) performing "Flickorna i Småland" with Charlotte Perrelli.
- Melodifestivalen 2006 (as host) (2006)
- Konstkuppen 2013 (as host) (2013)
- Performing at Julgalan (2014)

Rocktaget 1991

== Svensktoppen songs ==
- "Om kärleken är blind" – 1986
- "Kärleken är evig" – 1986
- "Åh Amadeus" – 1986
- "Det går väl an" – 1986
- "Dansa i neon" – 1987
- "Saknar dej innan du går" – 1987
- "Om igen"– 1988
- "I varje spegel" – 1988
- "Månsken i augusti" – 1994
- "Stjärnorna" – 1995
- "Det gör ont" – 2004
- "Delirium" – 2004
- "Lena Anthem" – 2004–2005
- "På gatan där jag bor" – 2004–2005
- "Unga pojkar & äldre män" – 2005
- "Han jobbar i affär" – 2005–2006
- "Jag ångrar ingenting" – 2006
- "Nu när du gått" – 2008 (with Orup)

=== Failing to enter the list ===
- "Bästa vänner" – 1997
- "Det ringer på min dörr" – 2006
- "Jag måste skynda mig på" – 2007 (with Orup)

== Songs on Radio P3 Tracks Top 20 Chart ==
- "Dansa i neon" – 1987
- "I'm a Fool" – 1988
- "Om igen" – 1988
- "Talkin in Your Sleep" – 1988
- "Tänd ett ljus" – 1989
- "Standing in My Rain" – 1989/1990
- "Why (så lätt kommer du inte undan)" – 1990
- "The Escape" – 1991
- "006" – 1991
- "Are You In, or Are You Out" – 1992
- "Fantasy" – 1993
- "Månsken i augusti" – 1994
- "Stjärnorna" – 1995
- "Det gör ont" – 2004
- "Delirium" – 2004
- "Lena Anthem" – 2004
- "På gatan där jag bor" – 2005
- "Unga pojkar & äldre män" – 2005
- "Han jobbar i affär" – 2005–2006
- "Jag ångrar ingenting" – 2006

=== Just outside the list ===
- "Blue Jeans" – 1989
- "Give Me Your Love" – 1993
- "Spell of Love" – 2001

Preceded by Fame	Sweden in the Eurovision Song Contest; 2004	Succeeded by Martin Stenmarck
Preceded by (Sweden) Arja Saijonmaa	OGAE Second Chance Contest winner 1988	Succeeded by (Denmark) Lecia Jønsson
