= Åh, Amadeus =

Song by Lena Philipsson

from the album Kärleken är evig
- Released: 21 April 1986
- Genre: Schlager
- Songwriters: Freddie Hansson; Peo Thyrén

Lena Philipsson singles chronology
"Kärleken är evig" (1986)	"Åh, Amadeus" (1986)	"Jag känner" (1986)

"Åh, Amadeus" is a song written by Freddie Hansson and Peo Thyrén, and recorded by Lena Philipsson at her 1986 debut album "Kärleken är evig" This version peaked at Svensktoppen between 1 June-28 September 1986 and peaked at 7th position during a visit lasting for nine weeks. The song was also recorded by Uzbekistani singer Leyla Norgren and released as a single the same year.

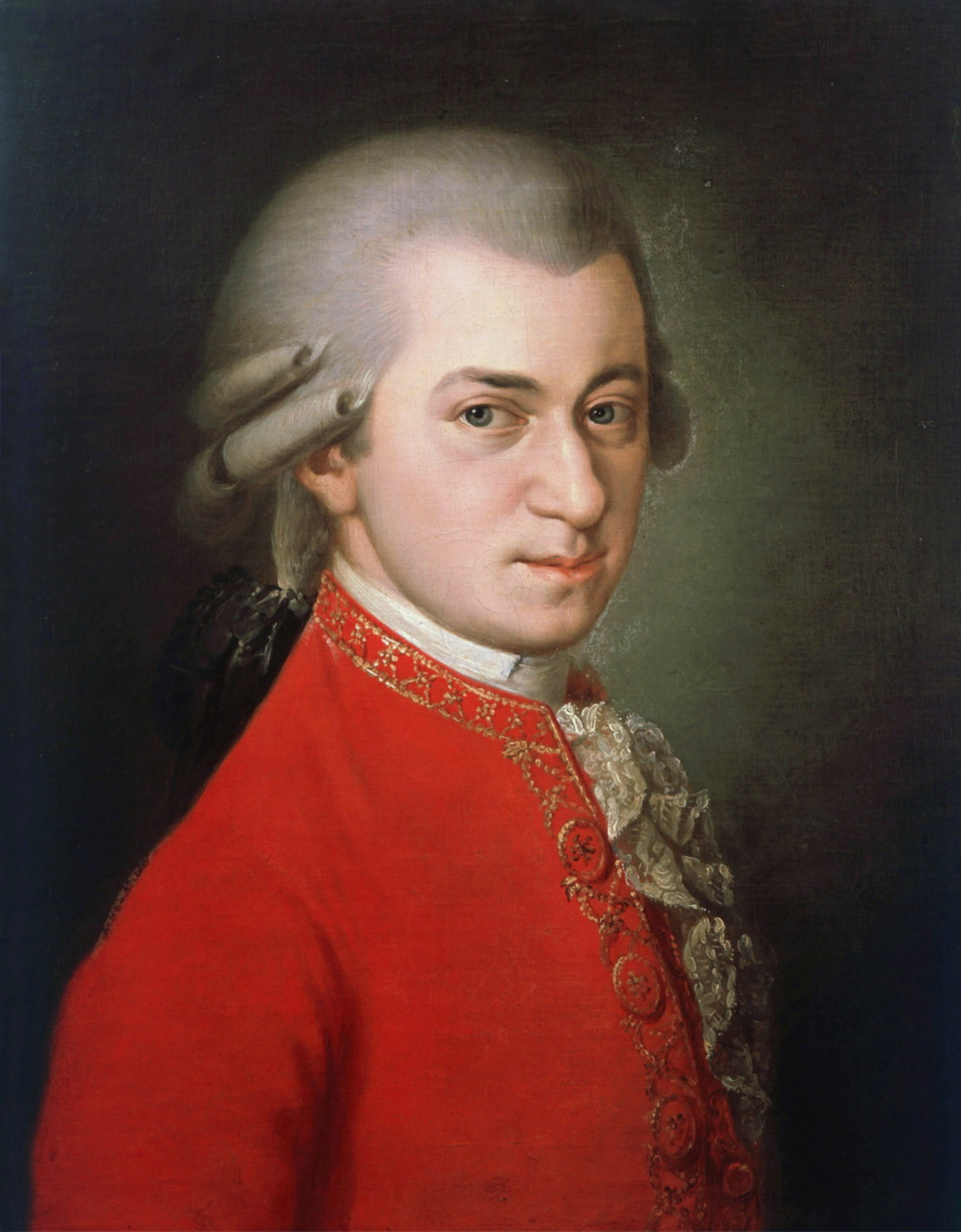
Wolfgang Amadeus Mozart

The song's lyrics repeatedly invoke the help of Mozart in regaining the singer's lost love. In the refrain, the singer expresses her wish to have the "magic flute's magic" ("trollflöjtens magi"), a reference to Mozart's opera The Magic Flute (The opera's title in Swedish is Trollflöjten.)
