= Torgny Söderberg =

Swedish songwriter (1944–2022)

- Born: 26 November 1944; Varberg, Sweden
- Died: 5 August 2022 (aged 77)
- Genres: Dansband music, Pop, Rock, Schlager
- Occupation: Songwriter

Sten Torgny Söderberg (26 November 1944 – 5 August 2022) was a Swedish songwriter. He was mainly known for working with Lena Philipsson and wrote schlager songs such as "100%", "Kärleken är evig" and "Diggi-loo diggi-ley". "Diggi-loo diggi-ley", written with lyricist Britt Lindeborg, won the Swedish heats of Melodifestivalen 1984 and later in the same year, won the Eurovision Song Contest 1984 for Sweden.
