= Kärleken är evig (song) =

Single by Lena Philipsson

from the album Kärleken är evig
- A-side: "Kärleken är evig"
- B-side: "Om kärleken är blind"
- Released: 1986
- Genre: Schlager
- Label: Mariann
- Songwriters: Torgny Söderberg; Per Gessle

Lena Philipsson singles chronology
"Boy" / "You Open My Eyes" (1984)	""Kärleken är evig" / "Om kärleken är blind"" (1986)	"Åh Amadeus" (1986)

"Kärleken är evig" ("Love is eternal") is a Swedish language song written by Torgny Söderberg and Per Gessle. Swedish pop singer Lena Philipsson sang "Kärleken är evig" at the Swedish Melodifestivalen 1986.

== Overview ==
It finished in second place, scoring 42 points. The song subsequently peaked at number three on the Swedish Singles Chart. The song was also at Svensktoppen for 7 weeks during the period 20 April-1 June 1986, with its highest position being second place during the debut week.

In 2001 the song was recorded by the Drifters on the band's studio album Om du vill ha mig.

== Charts ==
Chart (1986)	Peak position
Sweden (Sverigetopplistan)	6
