= Trackslistan =

Former Swedish radio program

- Genre: music
- Country of origin: Sweden
- Language(s): Swedish
- Home station: SR P3
- Original release: 8 September 1984 – 5 February 2011

Tracks, or Trackslistan, was a top-20 song list and a program on the Swedish radio channel SR P3. It premiered on 8 September 1984 and was broadcast on Saturday afternoons. The program had a listener vote-in format and was one of the top music charts in Sweden. The show's predecessor was Poporama, which ran from 1974 to 1984. Trackslistan was discontinued in 2011.
