= Orup =

Swedish musician (born 1958)

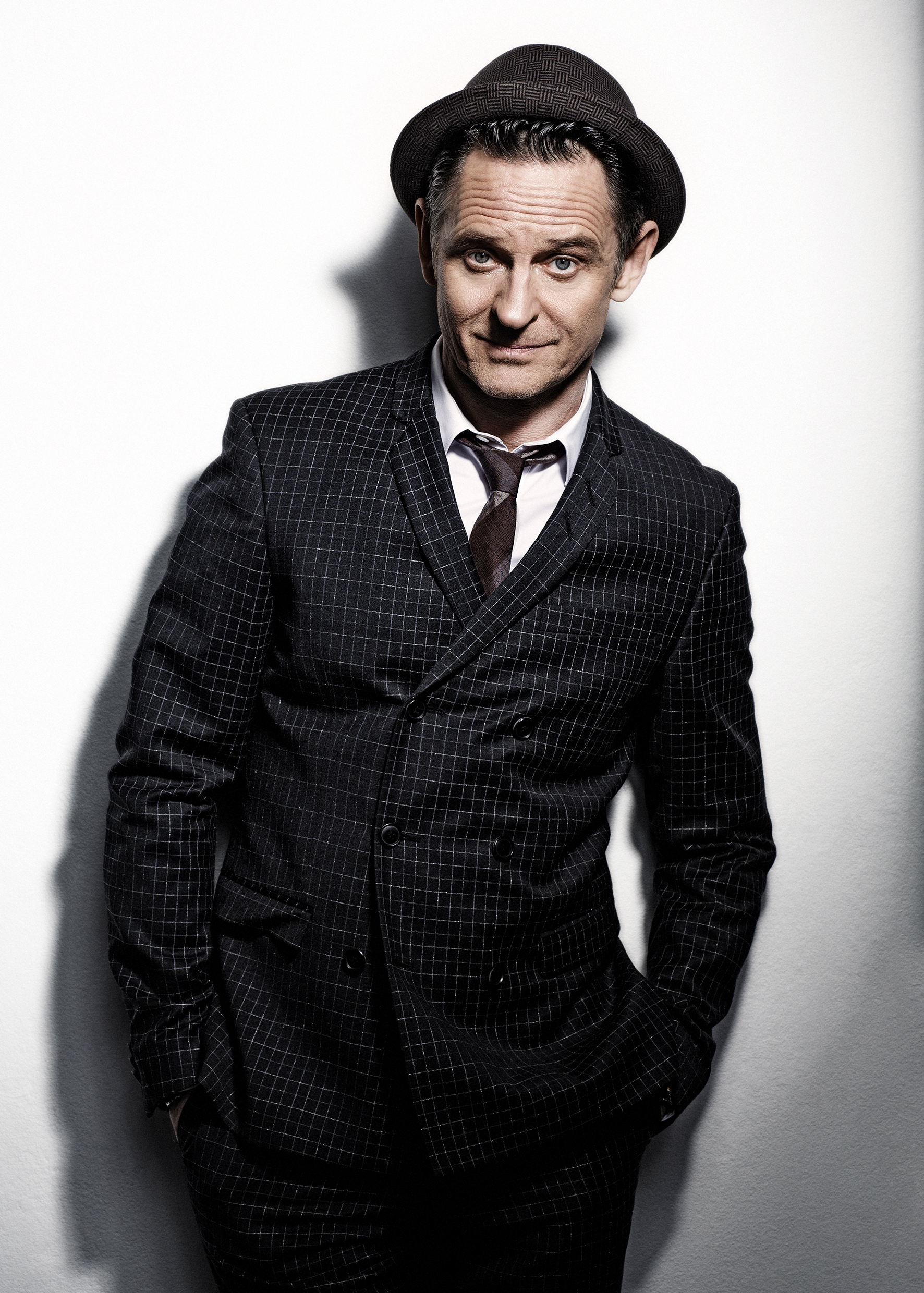
- Eriksson in 2014
- Born: Hans Thomas Eriksson; 29 November 1958 (age 67); Huddinge, Sweden
- Occupations: singer; songwriter; actor; musician
- Years active: 1973–present
- Spouses: Sofia Eklöf (m. 1989; div. 1996) Pernilla Pettersson (m. 2000)
- Children: 5
- Musical career
- Genre: Pop
- Instruments: Vocals; guitar
- Label: Roxy
- Formerly of: Glenmark Eriksson Strömstedt
- Website: orup.se

Hans Thomas Eriksson (born 29 November 1958), known by his stage name Orup, is a Swedish singer, songwriter and musician who enjoyed major success in his native country and Scandinavia in the late 1980s and early 1990s with songs like "Jag blir hellre jagad av vargar", "Regn hos mej", "M.B.", "Då står pojkarna på rad", "Magaluf", and "Stockholm". Orup has also written several songs for other performers. He wrote the winning song of Melodifestivalen 2004, "Det gör ont" performed by Lena Philipsson. He was one of the judges on X Factor in 2012. Orup also took part in season 5 of the Swedish TV-show Så mycket bättre, broadcast on TV4.

== Early life ==
Orup was born Hans Thomas Eriksson in Huddinge, Sweden, on 29 November 1958, as the second child of Ann-Marie and Hasse Eriksson; Orup's sister is six years his senior. Eriksson's household was a lower middle class one.

Orup's parents divorced when he was seven. Orup's father died on 24 July 1978.

Eriksson received his first guitar and a tape recorder for his eighth birthday. Orup was introduced to the Beatles by his sister. Eriksson was into sports, playing ice-hockey for Huddinge IK, as well as football and handball, until his early teens when he formed his first band, a Black Sabbath-inspired heavy metal band with himself as the lead singer.

After Orup left school, he worked several temporary jobs as a taxi driver, postman and waiter.

== Career ==
In 1973, when he was 14, Orup formed Magnum Bonum, a band inspired by American prog rockers Styx. At age 16 he wrote his first song, entitled "I Can't Get You Out Of My Mind", for his band MBI, an acronym for, and joint venture of, the two bands Magnum Bonum and Intermezzo.

In the late 1970s Orup grew fond of Anglo-American punk rock, whose short and intense songs appealed to him and would later become his ethos. He was into British bands the Sex Pistols and the Clash, and also American groups like MC5, the Stooges and the New York Dolls. Although he enjoyed listening to punk, it didn't show in his own songwriting. At this time he also discovered 1960s soul music and Motown, styles also known for having short and intense songs. Unlike punk, this type of music influenced him heavily, which was evident in his own music from the late 1980s onwards.

After Orup left Magnum Bonum, the band reached number one in the Swedish charts in 1978 with "Skateboard", a Swedish-language version of "LA Run" (an American-sounding single by a British group, the Carvells, that barely grazed the UK singles charts, peaking at 31 in 1977). Orup, in turn, had a first minor hit with "Kom och ta mej" (Come and take me), released by his band Intermezzo in 1979. In the 1980s, he formed and fronted the Talking Heads– and Devo-inspired new wave group Ubangi (1982–1985), and subsequently Thereisnoorchestra (1986–1987). Both bands were co-fronted by Cia Soro.

In 1986 a major-label A&R manager, Leif Käck, came across a demo of Orup's song "Vill du inte ha mina kyssar?" (Don't you want my kisses?) and recorded it with Björn Skifs. Käck also signed Orup to Warners as a solo artist. In the summer of 1987 Orup's debut single "Är du redo?" (Are you ready?), a go-go ditty, was released, reaching number 19 in the charts. In the summer of 1987 Orup was the opening act for the established acts Roxette, Eva Dahlgren and Ratata on the Rock runt riket tour.

His big breakthrough came that autumn with the follow-up single "Jag blir hellre jagad av vargar" (I'd rather be chased by wolves), which reached number 4. Orup's eponymous debut album, released in 1988, reached number one, as did the follow up album 2 in 1989. Both albums were produced by Anders Glenmark and contained a string of hit singles.

In 1989 Orup came close second in Melodifestivalen, performing "Upp över min öron" (Up over my ears) as a duet with Anders Glenmark.

Orup's third album, Orupean Songs, released in 1991 was his first (and to date only) album with lyrics in English. It failed to garner any interest in the Anglophone world, but sold a reasonable 80 000 copies in Sweden, which was nowhere near the success of his first two albums; his previous album had sold a staggering 250 000 copies.

Orup had two big hits in 1992 with "Stockholm", a heavily Pet Shop Boys-influenced dance track about his hometown, and "Magaluf" about the Mallorca holiday resort, both lifted from the album Stockholm och andra ställen (Stockholm and other places).

The summer of 1994 is a fond memory for Swedish sports fans, since Sweden came third in the football World Cup. The soundtrack to this event for many Swedes was the official anthem for the national team for the campaign, "När vi gräver guld i USA" (When we dig for gold in the USA). Originally the assignment went to Niklas Strömstedt alone, but his friends Anders Glenmark and the football crazy Orup convinced him to let them co-write the song with him. The three formed a supergroup, GES, an acronym of the trio's last names, and also released an album that year.

Orup released three more albums – Orup 5 (1993), Teddy (1998) and Elva hjärtan (2000). Orup has reported how difficult it was to get airplay for his music during this period. In 2003 GES released a second album, Den andra skivan (The second album).

In 2004 Orup wrote and produced "Det gör ont" (It hurts) for Lena Philipsson, which won Melodifestivalen that year and came fifth place in the Eurovision Song Contest. Orup wrote all the songs for Philipsson's 2004 album Det gör ont en stund på natten men inget på dan (It hurts a while at night but nothing daytime) and wrote or co-wrote all the songs for her follow up album Jag ångrar ingenting (I regret nothing) in 2005, and their 2008 duet album Dubbel (Double).

In 2006 and 2010 Orup released solo albums. In 2014 he created the successful show Viva la pop, performing hits from his career, interspersed with humorous monologs, for a dinner audience. In Sweden this format is called krogshow (roughly: restaurant show).

In 2017 GES played seven nights at Borgholm Castle in Öland, and in 2018 they went on a summer tour of Sweden, which became the subject of a TV4 documentary aired in 2019. For his 60th birthday, in 2018, he performed 35 songs for three hours and fifteen minutes at Globe Arena, Stockholm.

== Personal life ==
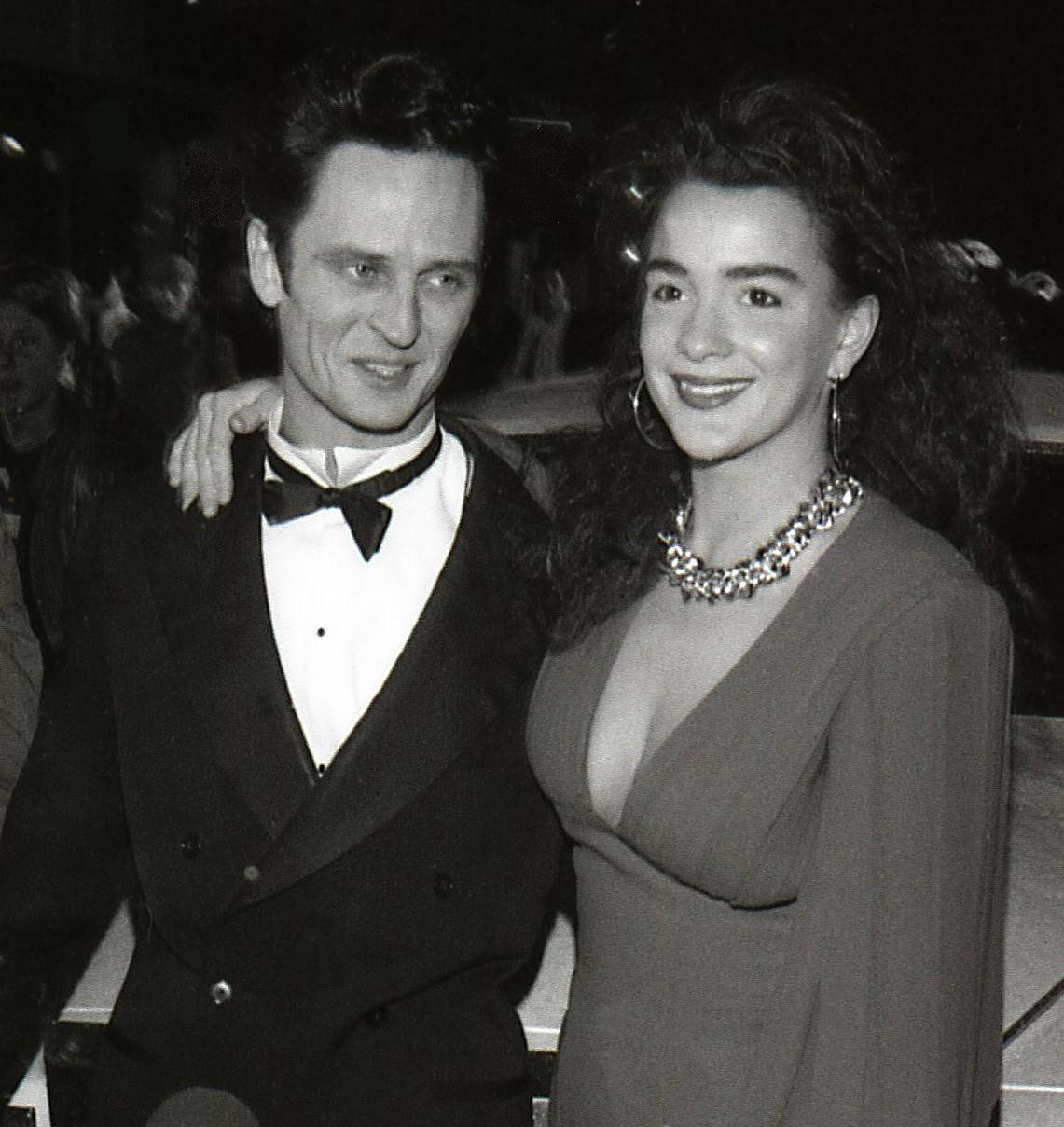
Orup (left) with his former wife, Sofia Eklöf, in 1988

Eriksson married the television presenter Sofia Eklöf in 1989. The marriage lasted seven years, and they had a son together, Kid (born 1991), a musician in the hip hop group Tjuvjakt. Orup is married to patternmaker Pernilla Pettersson. The couple have four children: daughter Charlie (born 2001) and sons Isidor (born 2001), Seth (born 2011) and Ozzy (born 2014).

They live in the Mariatorget district of Södermalm in Stockholm.

=== Health ===
Orup suffers from stuttering.

== Discography ==
Solo

- Orup (1988)
- Orup 2 (1989)
- Orupeansongs (1991)
- Stockholm & andra ställen (1992)
- Orup 5 - Jag vände mig om men det var ingen där (1993)
- Teddy (1998)
- Elva hjärtan (2000)
- Faktiskt (2006)
- Dubbel (2008) (with Lena Philipsson)
- Född i november (2010)

Glenmark Eriksson Strömstedt

- Glenmark, Eriksson, Strömstedt (1995)
- Den andra skivan (2003)

== Filmography ==
=== Television ===
Year	Title	Role	Notes
2014	Så mycket bättre	Himself	TV series
