= Dansa i neon (song) =

1987 single by Lena Philipsson and Dead by April

Single by Lena Philipsson

from the album Dansa i neon
- A-side: "Dansa i neon"
- B-side: "Åh, vad jag längtar"
- Released: 1987
- Genre: Schlager
- Label: Mariann
- Songwriters: Tim Norell; Peo Thyrén; Ola Håkansson

Lena Philipsson singles chronology
"Jag känner" (1987)	"Dansa i neon" / "Åh, vad jag längtar" (1987)	"Cheerio" / "Det går väl an" (1987)

"Dansa i neon" is a Swedish language song, sung by Swedish pop singer Lena Philipsson and finishing 5th at the Swedish Melodifestivalen 1987. "Dance in the Neon Light" is an English version of the Swedish language song. Dansa i neon was written by Tim Norell, Peo Thyrén and Ola Håkansson, and was first meant to have been performed by Lili & Susie. Ola Håkansson proposed that, but Sveriges Television said no.

Lena Philipsson released it as a single in 1987, which peaked at number nine on the Swedish Singles Chart. The song was also at Svensktoppen for 13 weeks during the period 22 March to 14 June 1987, with a second place during the debut week as best result there.

In 2011 Lena released a new version of the song in English entitled "Dance in the Neon Light" featuring the Swedish melodic metalcore band Dead by April.

== Cover versions ==
- Swedish heavy metal group Black Ingvars mashed "Dansa i neon" up with Europe's The Final Countdown on their 1998 album Schlager Metal.
- The dansband Barbados covered "Dansa i neon" on the 2000 album Kom hem.
- Thorsten Flinck and Ola Salo recorded the song in a duet on the 2004 Thorsten Flinck album Vildvuxna rosor.
- Swedish singer and 3X Melodifestivalen entrant Ace Wilder covered "Dansa I neon" to help promote a project she done in partnership with Swedish gambling lottery Trisslott where Wilder designed new scratchcards named "Skrapa i neon" (Scratch The Neon).

== English version ==
"Dance in the Neon Light"

Single by Lena Philipsson featuring Dead by April
- A-side: "Album version"
- B-side: "Instrumental version"
- Released: 20 February 2011
- Genre: Pop metal, melodic metalcore
- Length: 3:06
- Label: Universal
- Songwriters: Tim Norell, Peo Thyrén, Ola Håkansson, Lena Philipsson, Pontus Hjelm & Jimmie Strimell

Lena Philipsson singles chronology
"Fem Minuter i Himlen (feat. Orup)" (2009)	"Dance in the Neon Light" (2011)	"Idiot" (2011)

Dead by April singles chronology
""Love Like Blood/Promise Me"" (2010)	""Dance in the Neon Light"" (2011)	""Within My Heart"" (2011)

Philipsson sang the song and finished 5th at the Swedish Melodifestivalen 1987. During Melodifestivalen 2011 she performed the new version of her song with the Swedish metal band Dead by April as special guest before the winner was announced. The song was released as a digital single on 20 February 2011. The song was originally written by Tim Norell, Peo Thyrén and Ola Håkansson, but was re-arranged by Pontus Hjelm and Jimmie Strimell for the metal version with lyrics re-written in English by Lena Philipsson.

=== Track listing ===
Digital single

No.	Title	Length
1.	"Dance in the Neon Light (Single version)"	3:06
2.	"Dance in the Neon Light (Instrumental version)"	3:06

=== Charts ===
Country	Position
Sweden	50
