= Klassiska mästerverk =

Compilation album by Magnus Uggla
- Released: 24 May 2002
- Recorded: 1975–2002
- Length: 155:40
- Label: Columbia

Magnus Uggla chronology
Där jag är e're alltid bäst (2000)	Klassiska mästerverk (2002)	Den tatuerade generationen (2004)

Klassiska mästerverk is the fourth compilation album from Swedish pop rock musician Magnus Uggla. It was released in 2002.

== Track listing ==
CD one

1. "Kung för en dag" - 3:18
2. "Vittring" - 3:08
3. "Jag mår illa" - 4:08
4. "Varning på stan" - 4:40
5. "Fula gubbar" - 4:17
6. "Nitar & läder" - 4:03
7. "Staffans matematik" - 4:53
8. "Passionsfrukt" - 3:50
9. "Dansar aldrig nykter" - 3:38
10. "Hotta brudar" - 3:08
11. "IQ" - 3:31
12. "Mitt decennium" - 4:33
13. "Johnny the Rucker" - 4:49
14. "Pom Pom" - 3:37
15. "Skandal bjotis" - 4:06
16. "Jånni Balle" - 3:11
17. "Centrumhets" - 4:03
18. "Jag skiter" - 3:23
19. "Stockholms heta nätter" - 3:37
20. "Vi ska till VM" - 3:50

CD two

1. "4 sekunder" - 4:05
2. "Hallå" - 3:08
3. "Baby Boom" - 5:28
4. "Astrologen" - 5:09
5. "Trendit, trendit" - 3:51
6. "Hand i hand" - 4:38
7. "Mälarö kyrka" - 3:04
8. "Trubaduren" - 5:13
9. "Joey Killer" - 4:29
10. "Victoria" - 4:16
11. "Jag vill" - 3:44
12. "Visa" - 3:41
13. "Raggarna" - 3:12
14. "Ska vi gå hem till dig" - 5:08
15. "Ge livet en chans" - 3:02
16. "Sommartid" - 4:43
17. "Morsan e’ okej" - 3:22
18. "Ja just du ska va gla" - 4:30
19. "1:a gången" - 3:15

== Charts ==
=== Weekly charts ===
Chart (2002–2003, 2011)	Peak position
Norwegian Albums (VG-lista)	20
Swedish Albums (Sverigetopplistan)	1

=== Year-end charts ===
Chart (2002)	Position
Swedish Albums (Sverigetopplistan)	2
Chart (2003)	Position
Swedish Albums (Sverigetopplistan)	81

== Certifications ==
Region	Certification	Certified units/sales
Sweden (GLF)	3× Platinum	180,000^{^}
^{^} Shipments figures based on certification alone.
