= 100% Uggla =

1994 greatest hits album by Magnus Uggla

- Album cover

Greatest hits album by Magnus Uggla
- Released: October 1994
- Recorded: 1977–1993
- Length: 76:08
- Label: Columbia

Magnus Uggla chronology
Alla får påsar (1993)	100% Uggla (1994)	Karaoke (1997)

100% Uggla, subtitle: Absolut inget annat is the third compilation album by Swedish pop and rock artist Magnus Uggla, released in October 1994.

== Track listing ==
1. "Jag mår illa" - 4:06
2. "Varning på stan" - 4:41
3. "Fula gubbar" - 4:17
4. "4 sekunder" - 4:05
5. "IQ" ("Blue Blue (Victoria)") - 3:32
6. "Jag skiter" - 3:24
7. "Ska vi gå hem till dig" - 5:08
8. "Baby Boom" - 5:29
9. "Astrologen" - 5:09
10. "Joey Killer" - 4:29
11. "Vittring" - 3:08
12. "Dansar aldrig nykter" - 3:39
13. "Staffans matematik" - 4:53
14. "Centrumhets" (Metro Jets) - 4:03
15. "Mälarö kyrka" - 3:05
16. "Passionsfrukt" - 3:49
17. "Mitt decennium" - 4:32
18. "Hand i hand" - 4:39

== Charts ==
Chart (1994–1995)	Peak position
Swedish Albums (Sverigetopplistan)	1
