= Retrospektivt collage =

Compilation album by Magnus Uggla
- Released: December 1985
- Recorded: 1975–1983
- Length: 70:00

Magnus Uggla chronology
Välkommen till folkhemmet (1983)	Retrospektivt collage (1985)	Collection (1986)

Retrospektivt collage is the first compilation album by Swedish pop rock musician Magnus Uggla. It was released in December 1985 and produced by Anders Henriksson and Uggla.

== Track listing ==
1. "Varning på stan" - 4:41
2. "Centrumhets" (Metro Jets) - 4:05
3. "IQ" - 3:33
4. "Trendit, trendit" - 3:52
5. "Mälarö kyrka" - 3:05
6. "Hallå" - 3:08
7. "Johnny the Rucker" - 4:50
8. "Sommartid" - 4:46
9. "Hand i hand" - 4:41
10. "Skandal bjotis" - 4:09
11. "Vittring" - 3:09
12. "Jag skiter" - 3:25
13. "Jag vill inte gå hit" - 3:26
14. "Ge livet en chans" - 3:26
15. "Asfaltbarn" - 2:33
16. "Astrologen" - 5:15
17. "Retrospektivt collage" - 8:21
18. "Tjena Allena" - 0:29

The first LP edition had the bonus songs "Retrospektivt collage (short version)" and "Retrospektivt collage (different mix)".

== Charts ==
Chart (1986)	Peak position
Sweden (Sverigetopplistan)	10
