= Henrik Åström =

Swedish composer and music producer

- Born: Henrik Åström; 11 January 1980 (age 46); Sweden
- Occupations: composer, music producer

Henrik Åström (born 11 January 1980) is a Swedish composer and music producer. He is the son of the Swedish archaeologist Paul Åström and owner of the record label and publishing company A-Stream Productions since 2002.

== Film, television and theatre ==
Åström has written music for many feature films, such as the dramas Child of Grace and Cowboys and Indians by the award-winning director Ian McCrudden, Scammerhead by writer/director Dan Zukovic and Internment by writer/director Kast Hasa. One of his first film scores was for the drama Jake and Jasper – A Ferret Tale that was awarded with a 2012 Remi Award at the Worldfest-Houston International Film Festival. He has also composed the original score for two seasons of the Science Channel documentary series Secrets of the Viking Stone, directed by Peter Stormare. In 2022 Åström co-wrote the score for the documentary Ariel Phenomenon with Nate Walcott.

In addition to his work in film and TV, Åström has written and performed experimental music for the Butoh dancer and choreographer Frauke. He composed the music and created the sound design for her theatre work Ama-No-Gawa that was performed at the National Arts Festival in Grahamstown, South Africa, in 2010, and the solo dance performance Endangered that was performed at Atalante in Gothenburg in 2012. He also composed music for the dance festival Dance Bistro that was performed in Long Beach, California, in 2013.

== Studio ==
Åström was the owner of the recording studio A-Stream Studio at Sankt Eriksplan in Stockholm, Sweden, between 2002 and 2012. At this studio location he worked with artists such as Miss Li, Oh Laura, Erik Grönwall, Titiyo, Thomas Denver Jonsson, Annis Brander and Zooparty. Zooparty was co-produced by the former Sex Pistols member Glen Matlock.

== Filmography ==
- Radio Sky (2026) - composer
- Storm of the Heart (2025) - composer
- Healing Towers (2024) - composer
- The American Terrorist (2024) - composer
- Ariel Phenomenon (2022) – composer
- The American Runestone (2020) – composer
- Mango Bajito (2019) – composer
- Internment (2018) – composer
- Hope (2017) – composer
- Holding the Wire (2016) – composer
- Riddle Room (2016) – composer
- Dude, Where's My Ferret? (2015) – composer **VISFF Goldie Award Winner**
- Migration (2015) – composer
- Make Your Mark (2014) – composer
- Santa's Little Ferrets (2014) – composer
- Child of Grace (2014) – composer
- Scammerhead (2014) – composer
- My Deja Vu (2014) – composer
- Eyes Upon Waking (2014) – composer
- The Stray (2013) – composer
- The Magic Ferret (2013) – composer
- The Last Goodbye (2013) – composer
- Cowboys and Indians (2013) – composer
- The Beginning (2013) – composer
- The Gelephant (2013) – composer
- Captain Blackout (2013) – composer
- Larry Brought Lemon (2012) – composer
- Mango Bajito (2012) – composer
- Chameleon (2012) – composer
- Jake and Jasper: A Ferret Tale (2011) – composer
- Alice Wants Dessert (2011) – composer

== Selected discography ==
- Healing Towers (Original Motion Picture Soundtrack) (2025)
- The American Terrorist (Original Motion Picture Soundtrack) (2024)
- Ariel Phenomenon (Original Motion Picture Soundtrack) (2022)
- The American Runestone (Music from the Original TV Series) (2020)
- Internment (Original Motion Picture Soundtrack) (2019)
- Mango Bajito – Original Motion Picture Score (2017)
- Holding the Wire – Original Motion Picture Score (2016)
- Child of Grace – Original Motion Picture Score (2015)
- Cowboys and Indians (Original Motion Picture Soundtrack) (2013)
- Cajsa Siik, Plastic House (2012)
- Annis Brander, Glass People in the Woods (2011)
- Min Lilla Värld, Min Lilla Värld (2010)
- Kristina Westberg, Good Days (2009)
- Zooparty (feat. Glen Matlock), Re-fuse (2009)
- Charle Porter, Charlee Porter (2008)
- Annis Brander (feat. Titiyo), If it's a dead fish, it's a dead fish (2008)
- Miss Li, God Put a Rainbow in the Sky (2007)
- Miss Li, Late Night Heartbroken Blues (2006)
