= Wolves (Miss Li album) =

Studio album by Miss Li
- Released: 10 April 2013
- Genre: Pop
- Length: 64:43
- Label: EMI
- Producer: Sonny Gustafsson

Miss Li chronology
Singles and Selected (2012)	Wolves (2013)	A Woman's Guide to Survival (2017)

Wolves is the seventh studio album by Miss Li, released in 2013. The album was released in North America on 11 May 2014. A double album, its first disc features material written solely by Miss Li and producer Sonny Boy Gustafsson, while the second disc comprises cover versions of songs by other artists.

== Track listing ==
Disc one
No.	Title	Writer(s)	Length
1.	"Spaceship"	Linda Karlsson; Sonny Gustafsson	3:59
2.	"Sugar Coma"	Karlsson; Gustafsson	3:31
3.	"Transformer"	Karlsson; Gustafsson	3:42
4.	"Dancing in the Dark"	Karlsson; Gustafsson	3:57
5.	"Happy Birthday"	Karlsson; Gustafsson	2:13
6.	"Black Widow"	Karlsson; Gustafsson	3:56
7.	"Russian Roulette"	Karlsson; Gustafsson	4:08
8.	"Interlude"	Karlsson; Gustafsson	1:08
9.	"The Room"	Karlsson; Gustafsson	5:15

Disc two
No.	Title	Writer(s)	Length
10.	"Här kommer natten"	Pugh Rogefeldt	3:51
11.	"Nåt för dom som väntar"	Olle Ljungström	4:31
12.	"Under isen (ligger himlen)"	Stefan Sundström	5:10
13.	"1:a gången"	Magnus Uggla; Anders Henriksson	3:28
14.	"När tåget går"	Sundström	6:12
15.	"No One Sleeps When I'm Awake"	Jesper Anderberg; Félix Rodríguez; Fredrik Nilsson; Maja Ivarsson	3:53
16.	"Lovekiller"	Darin Zanyar; Tony Nilsson	2:46
17.	"Somebody Loves You"	Allen Reynolds	3:03
Total length:			64:43

== Charts ==
Chart (2013)	Peak position
Swedish Albums (Sverigetopplistan)	2
