= Collection (Magnus Uggla album) =

Compilation album by Magnus Uggla
- Released: 1985
- Recorded: 1975–1983

Magnus Uggla chronology
Retrospektivt collage (1985)	Collection (1985)	Den döende dandyn (1986)

Collection is a 1985 half official double compilation album from Swedish pop and rock artist Magnus Uggla. The album was released for the Finnish market.

== Track listing ==
=== A ===
1. IQ
2. Jazzgossen
3. Raggarna
4. Mälarö kyrka
5. Vi möttes bara för en kväll
6. Astrologen

=== B ===
1. Varning på stan
2. Barn av sin stad
3. Just den där
4. Centrumhets (Metro Jets)

=== C ===
1. Sommartid
2. Asfaltbarn
3. Vår tid 1977
4. Rock’n roll revolution
5. Hjärtekrossare

=== D ===
1. Bobbo Viking
2. Lena
3. Ja just du ska va gla
4. Draget
5. Panik
