= Tangerine Dream (disambiguation) =

Tangerine Dream is a German electronic music band.

Tangerine Dream may also refer to:

== Music ==
- Tangerine Dream (Kaleidoscope album), 1967
- Tangerine Dream (Miss Li album), 2012
- Tangerine Dream, a mixtape by Alex Wiley
- "Tangerine Dream" (song), a 1999 song by Do As Infinity

== Other uses ==
- Tangerine Dream (cannabis), a sativa-dominant hybrid strain of cannabis
- Tangerine Dream, a film by ski filmmakers Teton Gravity Research
- Tangerine Dream, a fictional gas planet in the Revelation Space novel series
- Tangerine Dreams, a computer that The Cheat uses in the Homestar Runner cartoons
