= Vi ska till VM =

Single by Magnus Uggla

from the album Klassiska mästerverk
- A-side: "Vi ska till VM"
- B-side: "Vi ska till VM" (instrumental version)
- Released: 2002
- Genre: Pop rock
- Songwriters: Magnus Uggla, Anders Henriksson
- Producers: Peter Kvint, Simon Nordberg

Magnus Uggla singles chronology
"Där vi är e're alltid bäst" (2001)	"Vi ska till VM" (2002)	"Värsta grymma tjejen" (2004)

"Vi ska till VM" is a song written by Magnus Uggla and Anders Henriksson, and was the official song for the Swedish men's national team during the 2002 FIFA World Cup in Japan and South Korea. Uggla recorded the song and released it as a single and it subsequently topped the Swedish Singles Chart. It was also tested for Svensktoppen on 1 June 2002, but failed to enter chart.

== Charts ==
=== Weekly charts ===
Chart (2002)	Peak position
Sweden (Sverigetopplistan)	1

=== Year-end charts ===
Chart (2002)	Position
Sweden (Sverigetopplistan)	13
