= Pärlor åt svin =

Single by Magnus Uggla

from the album Pärlor åt svinen
- Released: 2007
- Songwriters: Magnus Uggla, Anders Henriksson

Magnus Uggla singles chronology
"För kung och fosterland" (2006)	"Pärlor åt svin" (2007)	"Vild och skild" (2007)

"Pärlor åt svin" (Pearls before swine) is a song written and composed by Magnus Uggla and Anders Henriksson. It was recorded by Magnus Uggla and released as a single in 2007, topping the Swedish singles chart. The song also appeared on Uggla's 2007 studio album, Pärlor åt svinen.

The song charted at Svensktoppen for seven weeks between 14 October-25 November 2007, peaking at third position.

== Charts ==
Chart (2007–2008)	Peak position
Sweden (Sverigetopplistan)	1
