= Godkänd pirat =

1981 Magnus Uggla live album

Live album by Magnus Uggla
- Released: May 1981
- Recorded: December 1980
- Length: 55:37
- Label: CBS
- Producer: Anders Eljas, Anders Oredsson, Magnus Uggla

Magnus Uggla chronology
Den ljusnande framtid är vår (1980)	Godkänd pirat (1981)	Välkommen till folkhemmet (1983)

Godkänd pirat is the first live album and sixth overall album by Swedish pop and rock artist Magnus Uggla. It was released in 1981 as a double album on 45 RPM. The album was recorded and released to stop distribution of bootleg recordings from Uggla's concerts. This is also the reason why the album's title is Godkänd pirat, which translates to English as Approved Pirate.

The last song on the album is a studio track, a re-recording of Uggla's 1976 single "Sommartid". The new version was also released as a single in 1981.

== Track listing ==
Sida ett

1. "Mitt liv?" - 3:51
2. "Ja just du ska va gla" - 2:57
3. "Jag vill inte tillbaks" - 3:51
4. "Trendigt, trendigt" - 3:14
5. "Någon som dej (Någon som du är)" - 3:42

Sida två

1. "Jag vill inte gå dit" - 2:58
2. "Varit kär" - 3:09
3. "Centrumhets" - 4:14
4. "Varning på stan" - 3:52

Sida tre

1. "Panik (Uppfostringsmaskinen)" - 4:23
2. "Skandal-bjotis" - 6:13
3. Rockmedley:
  1. "Vittring" - 3:00
  2. "Rebel Rebel" (David Bowie) - 1:21
  3. "Born to Be Wild (Steppenwolf) - 1:50
  4. "Sheena Is a Punk Rocker" (Ramones) - 1:22
  5. "Vittring" - 0:47

Sida fyra

1. "Sommartid (new version)" - 4:53

== Charts ==
Chart (1981)	Peak position
Swedish Albums (Sverigetopplistan)	8
