= Jånni Balle =

Single by Magnus Uggla

from the album Alla får påsar
- A-side: "Jånni Balle"
- B-side: "Jånni Balle" (maxi-version)
- Released: 1993
- Genre: pop rock
- Label: Sony
- Songwriters: Anders Henriksson; Magnus Uggla

Magnus Uggla singles chronology
"4 sekunder" (1993)	"Jånni Balle" (1993)	"1:a gången" (1993)

"Jånni Balle" is a song written by Magnus Uggla and Anders Henriksson and recorded by Uggla for his 1993 studio album Alla får påsar. The single peaked at number 25 on the Swedish Singles Chart and became the 59th most successful Trackslistan song of 1993.

== Charts ==
Chart (1993)	Peak position
Sweden (Sverigetopplistan)	25
