= För kung och fosterland =

Single by Magnus Uggla

from the album Pärlor åt svinen
- Released: 5 March 2007
- Genre: Pop
- Label: Ugly Music
- Songwriters: Magnus Uggla, Anders Henriksson

Magnus Uggla singles chronology
| "Jag är ett bedårande barn av min tid" (2006) | "För kung och fosterland" (2007) | "Pärlor åt svin" (2007) |

"För kung och fosterland" is a song written by Magnus Uggla and Anders Henriksson and performed by Uggla in Melodifestivalen 2007. The song participated in the semifinal in Gävle on 24 February 2007, and reached Andra chansen in Nyköping on 3 March 2007, but failed to reach the finals. The song lyrics criticise consumer society.

On 5 March 2007, the single was released, peaking at number 11 on the Swedish singles chart.

The song also charted at Svensktoppen, entering the chart on 1 April 2007, ending up at number 10. The following week, the song was knocked out of the chart.

During Melodifestivalen 2012, the song was appointed a "Tredje chansen" number.

== Single track listing ==
1. För kung och fosterland (3:03)

== Charts ==
| Chart (2007) | Peak position |
|---|---|
| Sweden (Sverigetopplistan) | 11 |
