= Trubaduren =

Single by Magnus Uggla

from the album Alla får påsar
- Released: 1994
- Genre: Pop rock
- Songwriters: Anders Henriksson, Magnus Uggla

Magnus Uggla singles chronology
"Mitt decennium" (1994)	"Trubaduren" (1994)	"Kung för en dag" (1997)

"Trubaduren" is a ballad song written by Magnus Uggla and Anders Henriksson, and performed by Magnus Uggla on the album Alla får påsar.

The song was tested for Svensktoppen, where it stayed for seven weeks during the period 17 September–29 October 1994, peaking at third position.

The song lyrics depict a male protagonist together with some other people at a beach during a party in Tylösand, where the protagonist tries to start a romance with a girl. Suddenly, a troubadour appears with the guitar and the harmonica, and begins to sing and play until the protagonist walks home. Lyrically, the song mentions several songs, artists and music groups.

Lyrically, the song is one of those Uggla are the most pleased with. The Nanana-refrain was written so you could also sing the Simon & Garfunkel song The Boxer, a song popular among street musicians. According to Uggla, the idea for the song came when Hans Gardemar – a keyboard player he got to know during the Povel Ramel revue and who used to bring a melodica, to events like Uggla's birthday, appeared with his brother, who used to play the violin. The song is often played during Uggla concerts and has become popular as a sing-along song.

In the third season of the Swedish show Så mycket bättre, Uggla sang the song together with Olle Ljungström.

== Charts ==
Chart (1994)	Peak position
Sweden (Svensktoppen)	3

Chart (2021)	Peak position
Sweden Heatseeker (Sverigetopplistan)	9
