= Roaring 1980s =

Economic boom in Sweden

The Roaring 1980s (Swedish: Glada 1980-talet) is the name of the economic boom in Sweden during the mid-late 1980s.

== Background ==
The years after the 1973 oil crisis was a time of economic recession. In October 1982 a devaluation of the Swedish currency was done. On 21 November 1985, the credit market became free. and the international economic boom that had begun spread into Sweden.

== Trends ==
A yuppie culture developed at the Stockholm Stock Exchange. Mobile telephones were also known by the popular nickname "yuppienalle". ("Yuppie's teddy bear") The term finansvalp ("finance puppy") was common when referring to young businessmen. The contemporary yuppie culture was criticized by, among others, Stig Malm in his 1987 First of May speech.

Buying and selling art also became popular within the world of businesses.

== Culture and other entertainment ==
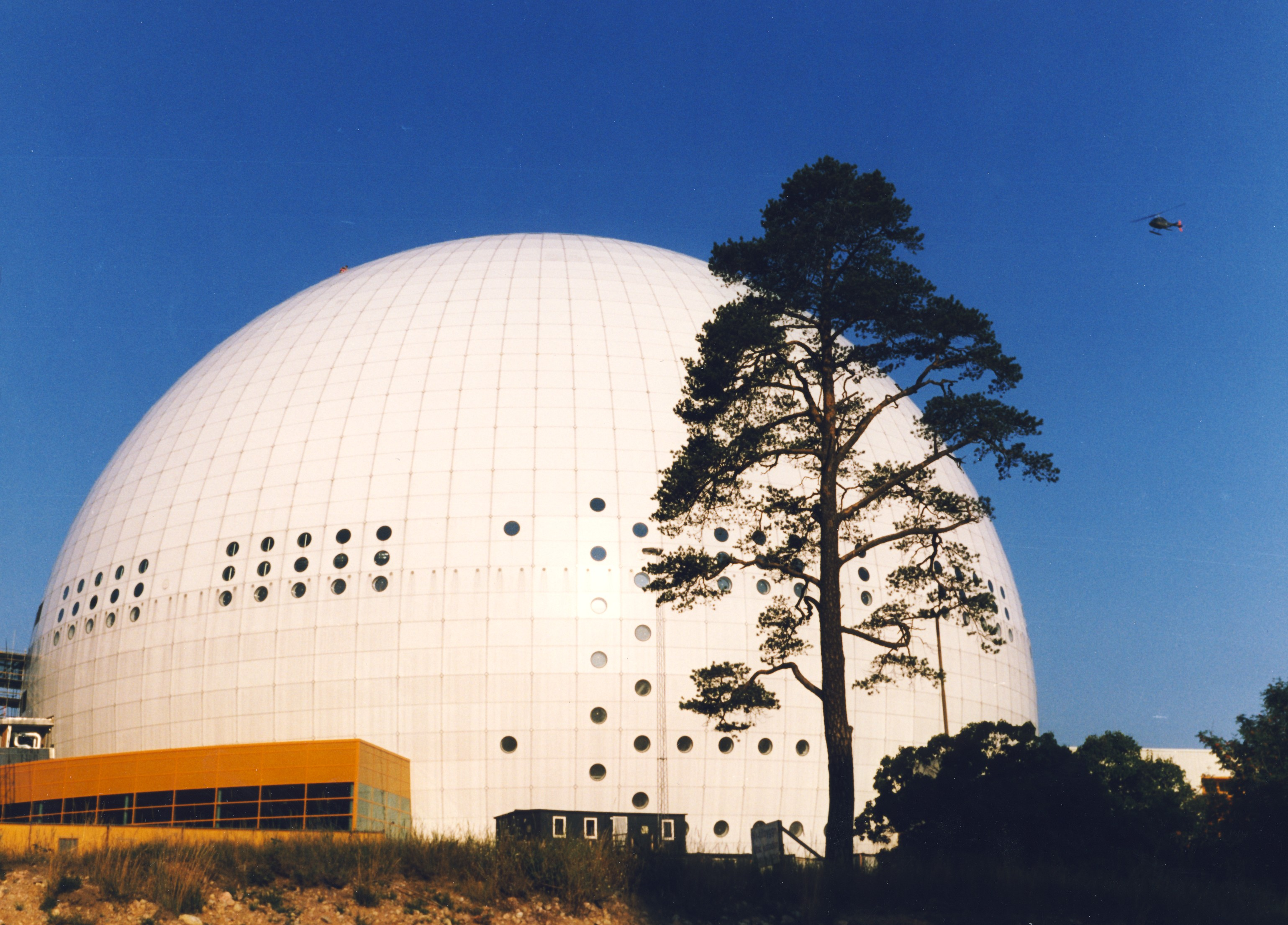
The Stockholm Globe Arena was built at this time.

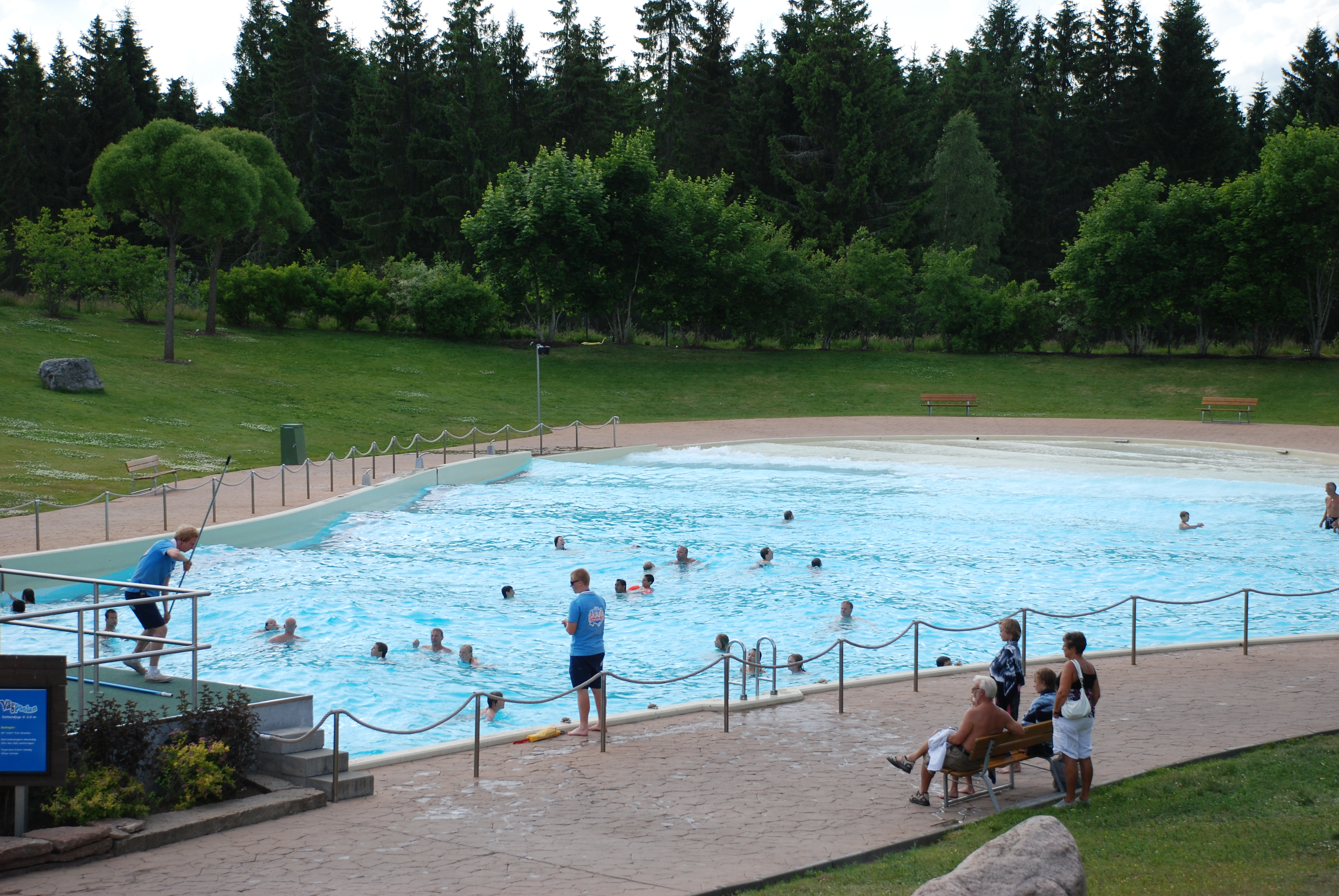
Several summer parks were built in Sweden during these years. Skara Sommarland was one of them.

The Stockholm Globe Arena was built between 1986-1988 and opened in 1989. It has been described as an expression of the contemporary optimism for the future. Several summer parks opened during this period.

== Popular culture ==
The 1993 Magnus Uggla song Mitt decennium describes the phenomena.

== See also ==
- Swedish banking rescue
- Roaring Twenties
- Post–World War II economic expansion
