= Häng me' på party =

Single by Ulf Neidemar
- Released: 1971
- Songwriter: Ulf Neidemar

Häng me' på party, written by Ulf Neidemar, is a song recorded by Ulf Neidemar and released as a single in 1971. An Ola Håkansson recording stayed at Svensktoppen for three weeks between 6–20 August 1972 with three 7th positions. Magnus Uggla recorded the song at his 1987 cover album "Allting som ni gör kan jag göra bättre".
