= Så mycket Olle Ljungström =

Compilation album by Olle Ljungström
- Released: December 2012
- Recorded: 1993–2012
- Genres: pop, rock
- Length: 2 hours, 47 minutes
- Label: Warner Music Sweden

Olle Ljungström chronology
Sju (2009)	Så mycket Olle Ljungström (2012)	Släng in en clown (2013)

Så mycket Olle Ljungström is a triple Olle Ljungström compilation album released in December 2012. CD 1 and 2 consist of songs from Olle Ljungström's solo albums, while CD 3 consists of his songs from the Så mycket bättre 2012 programme, as well as a rerecording of his older song "Min trädgård".

== Track listing ==
=== CD 1 ===
1. En apa som liknar dig
2. Överallt
3. Jag och min far
4. Vatten, sol och ängar
5. Jag spelar vanlig
6. Sthlm, sthlm
7. Som man bäddar
8. Hur långt kan det gå
9. La la la
10. Du och jag
11. Jesus kan
12. Tysk indian
13. Kaffe & cigarette
14. Minns i november
15. Feber
16. En galen hund
17. Att vi älskar
18. Svenskt stål

=== CD 2 ===
1. Norrländska präriens gudinna
2. Nåt för dom som väntar
3. Du sköna värld
4. Bara himlen ser på
5. Solens strålar
6. Det betyder ingenting
7. Som du
8. Somnar om
9. Sveriges sista cowboy
10. En förgiftad man
11. Happy End
12. Morotsman
13. Skjut dom som älskar
14. Nitroglycerin
15. Du ska bli min
16. Sötnos
17. Hjältar
18. Vila vid denna källa

=== CD 3 ===
1. Dinga linga Lena
2. Om du lämnade mig nu
3. Johnny the Rucker
4. Rock n Roll
5. Eviva España
6. Who's That Girl
7. I min trädgård (acoustic)

== Charts ==
Chart (2013)	Peak position
Sweden (Sverigetopplistan)	2
