= Livets teater =

- Album cover

Studio album by Magnus Uggla
- Released: October 1976
- Recorded: December 1975–1976
- Genre: Glam rock; art rock; progressive rock
- Length: 56:18
- Label: CBS
- Producer: Anders Henriksson

Magnus Uggla chronology
Om Bobbo Viking (1975)	Livets teater (1976)	Va ska man ta livet av sig för när man ändå inte får höra snacket efteråt (1977)

Livets teater is a studio album by Swedish pop and rock artist Magnus Uggla. It was released in October 1976, and was his second studio album. The album peaked at number 28 on the Swedish Albums Chart. In the documentary movie Rockdokumentären, Magnus Uggla stated that he was heavily inspired by the progressive rock bands Yes and Genesis during the writing and recording of this album. Uggla claimed in October 2000 that Livets teater was, in his opinion, the worst album he had made.

== Singles ==
"Sommartid" was the first single released by Magnus Uggla and it became a minor hit. It was later re-recorded for Uggla's 1981 live album Godkänd pirat, and remixed for a rare promotion EP in 1986. In 1978, it was covered by Uggla's live band Strix Q for their first solo album. The 1986 remix of "Sommartid" was featured in the 2010 movie Snabba Cash. In 2012, Maja Ivarsson recorded and performed "Sommartid" for the TV show Så mycket bättre.

== Track listing ==
All tracks written by Magnus Uggla.

Side one
1. "Draget" - 4:02
2. "Glittrande Sune" - 5:44
3. "Sommartid" - 4:40
4. "Två små primadonnor" - 5:30
5. "Barn av sin stad" - 7:03
Side two
1. "Livets teater" - 29:19

(a) "Intro"

Act I: "Den auktoritära vägen:"

(b) "Den tysta dramatiken"
(c) "Dansmästaren"
(d) "Mr Strix"

Act II: "Livets teater:"

(e) "Livets i toys"
(f) "Livets teater"

Act III: "Frigörelsen:"

(g) "Livets maskerad"
(h) "Primalskriket"

== Charts ==
Chart (1976–1977)	Peak position
Swedish Albums (Sverigetopplistan)	28
