= Livet, döden, skiten däremellan =

2024 studio album by Miss Li

Studio album by Miss Li
- Released: 11 October 2024
- Genre: Pop
- Length: 32:30
- Language: Swedish
- Label: Pistol Packin' Music
- Producer: Sonny Gustafsson

Miss Li chronology
Wonderful Misery (2021)	Livet, döden, skiten däremellan (2024)

Singles from Livet, döden, skiten däremellan
- 1. "X" Released: 18 March 2022; 2. "Hälsa Gud" Released: 28 October 2022; 3. "Ålderdomshemmet" Released: 31 March 2023; 4. "Misstag" Released: 23 February 2024; 5. "Maraton" Released: 12 April 2024; 6. "Verktygslådan" Released: 14 June 2024; 7. "Småstadsdrömmar" Released: 13 September 2024

Professional ratings
Review scores
Source	Rating
Aftonbladet	3/5 stars
Göteborgs-Posten	4/5 stars

Livet, döden, skiten däremellan (lit. 'the life, the death, the shit in between') is the tenth studio album by the Swedish singer-songwriter Miss Li. Released on 11 October 2024 by Pistol Packin' Music, the album peaked fifth place in the Swedish Albums Chart. It was co-produced by her significant other Sonny Gustafsson, and features singer-songwriter Eah Jé and actress Pernilla August. The album's theme cover topics such as concerns in different life stages and the meaning of life.

The album's first single, titled "X", was released on 18 March 2022. The song peaked second place in the Swedish Singles Chart. On 28 October 2022 and 31 March 2023, she released the next singles titled "Hälsa Gud" and "Ålderdomshemmet" respectively. Four other singles was released throughout 2024, prior to releasing the album.

== Track listing ==
Livet, döden, skiten däremellan track listing
No.	Title	Length
1.	"21 juli"	0:43
2.	"Den rastlösa själen"	2:15
3.	"Småstadsdrömmar"	2:55
4.	"Lilla Linda"	0:24
5.	"Revolt"	2:20
6.	"Duktiga flickan är död"	0:09
7.	"Misstag"	3:11
8.	"Mellan Avesta och Sala"	0:38
9.	"Verktygslådan"	2:47
10.	"X"	2:41
11.	"På måndag"	2:58
12.	"Maraton" (feat Eah Jé)	2:20
13.	"Svårt att tro"	0:25
14.	"Hälsa Gud"	2:29
15.	"Drömde"	1:33
16.	"Ålderdomshemmet"	3:03
17.	"Sista låten" (feat Pernilla August)	1:31
Total length:		32:30

== Personnel ==
- Linda Karlsson – vocals, writer, composer
- Sonny Gustafsson – producer, writer, composer
- Eah Jé – vocals ("Maraton" only)
- Pernilla August – vocals ("Sista låten" only)
- Wojtek Goral – saxophone
- Victor Hvidtfeldt – violin
- Henke Jonsson – mastering engineer
- Lasse Mårtén – mixing engineer
