= Forever Drunk =

Forever Drunk may refer to:

- "Forever Drunk", a 2011 song by Miss Li from her album Beats & Bruises
- "Forever Drunk", a 2022 song by Peach PRC
- "Forever Drunk", a 2022 episode from Pause with Sam Jay

== See also ==
- "Forever Young, Forever Drunk", a 2017 song by the Hatters
