= Finalmente =

Song by Wilma Goich
- Language: Italian
- Released: 1968
- Genre: popular music
- Songwriters: Ricky Gianco, Dante Pieretti, Gianni Sanjust

Finalmente is a song written by Ricky Gianco, Dante Pieretti and Gianni Sanjust, and recorded by Wilma Goich in 1968. Britt Lindeborg wrote lyrics in Swedish as Tycker om dig, and the song was recorded by Sylvia Vrethammar, releasing it as a B-side for the 1969 single Lärling på våran gård (Son of a Preacher Man). With these lyrics the song was also recorded by Swedish band the Drifters on 2008 album. Tycker om dig: Svängiga låtar från förr.

Magnus Uggla performed the song during Så mycket bättre 2012, and also recorded the song live for the album Magnus den store.
