= Victoria (Magnus Uggla song) =

Single by Magnus Uggla

from the album Alla får påsar
- Released: 1994
- Genre: Pop rock
- Songwriters: Anders Henriksson; Magnus Uggla

Magnus Uggla singles chronology
"Dansar aldrig nykter" (1993)	"Victoria" (1994)	"Mitt decennium" (1994)

Victoria is a song written by Magnus Uggla and Anders Henriksson and recorded by Uggla on the 1993 album Alla får påsar. The song was written for Uggla's wife Lolo's 35th birthday. While using references to the monarchy of Sweden, the lyrics deals with loving someone despite the other person not being perfect.

The song charted at Svensktoppen four seven weeks between 28 May-9 July 1994, peaking at second position. The song also charted at Trackslistan for three weeks.
