= Vild och skild =

Single by Magnus Uggla

from the album Pärlor åt svinen
- Released: December 2007
- Genre: pop rock
- Songwriter: Magnus Uggla

Magnus Uggla singles chronology
| "Pärlor åt svin" (2007) | "Vild och skild" (2007) | "24 timmar" (2008) |

"Vild & skild" is a song written by Magnus Uggla, and recorded by him on his 2007 album Pärlor åt svinen. It was released as a single the same year.

The song became a Svensktoppen success, where it stayed for 9 weeks between 13 January.-9 March 2008, before leaving the chart, peaking at number seven. The song also peaked at number 50 on the Swedish Singles Chart.

== Charts ==
| Chart (2007–2008) | Peak position |
|---|---|
| Sweden (Sverigetopplistan) | 50 |
