= Magnus den store =

Live album by Magnus Uggla
- Released: 27 February 2013
- Recorded: Hamburger Börs, Stockholm, Sweden 2013 (track 1-9), Rondo, Gothenburg, Sweden, 2010 (track 10-11), Studio Brun (track 12-17)
- Genre: pop rock
- Length: 58 minutes
- Label: EMI Music Sweden

Magnus Uggla chronology
Innan filmen tagit slut (2011)	Magnus den store (2013)

Magnus den store is a Magnus Uggla live album, released in 2013. It was released on 27 February 2013.

== Track listing ==
1. Stäng av mobilen
2. Jag är jag
3. Nallebjörn
4. Vill inte ha dig
5. Tick tack
6. Alla flickor visslar
7. Leva med min afro
8. Århundradets fest
9. Finalen
10. Montezumas hämnd
11. På egen hand
12. Jag och min far
13. Tycker om dig (Finalmente)
14. Har hört om en tjej (I Heard of a Girl)
15. Jag skiter i Amerika (Living in America)
16. Försvinn ur mitt liv (You're out of My Life)
17. Vandrar i ett regn

== Charts ==
Chart (2013)	Peak position
Sweden (Sverigetopplistan)	5
