= Allting som ni gör kan jag göra bättre =

Studio album by Magnus Uggla
- Released: November 1987
- Genre: Synth-pop
- Length: 37:45
- Label: CBS
- Producer: Tomas Ledin

Magnus Uggla chronology
Den döende dandyn (1986)	Allting som ni gör kan jag göra bättre (1987)	35-åringen (1989)

Allting som ni gör kan jag göra bättre (English: "Everything you can do, I can do better") is the eighth studio album by Swedish pop and rock artist Magnus Uggla. It was released in 1987. The album consists only of cover songs. The title is a reference to both the fact that the entire album is cover songs, "you" being the original artists, and also a call-back to the musical Annie Get Your Gun. Most of the songs are famous recordings from the progg era.

== Cover ==
The back of the album cover features Carl Johan De Geer's painting Skända flaggan from 1967.

== Track listing ==
Side one

1. "Livet är en fest" (covering Nationalteatern) – 3:28
2. "Påtalåten" (covering Ola Magnell) – 3:28
3. "Vem kan man lita på?" (covering Hoola Bandoola Band) – 4:08
4. "Häng me' på party" (covering Ulf Neidemar) – 2:56
5. "I natt är jag din" (covering Tomas Ledin) – 4:10

Side two

1. "Hög standard" (covering Peps Blodsband) – 3:27
2. "Tjejer (Potpurri)" ("Vi måste höja våra röster") covering Margareta Garpe, Suzanne Osten och Gunnar Edander and "1000 systrar" covering Jösses Flickor) – 2:43
3. "In kommer Gösta" (covering Philemon Arthur and the Dung) – 1:56
4. "Speedy Gonzales" (covering Nationalteatern) – 3:22
5. "Hog farm" (covering Pugh Rogefeldt) – 3:02
6. "Ska vi gå hem till dig" (covering Lasse Tennander) – 5:05

The original LP has a version of "Vem kan man lita på" where the lyrics ”och Robert Zimmerman flytt till landet med miljonerna” ("and Robert Zimmerman has fled to the country with the millions") is replaced by ”och Björn Afzelius har flytt till Italien med miljonerna” ("and (Swedish rock singer) Björn Afzelius has fled to Italy with the millions"). That version was later withdrawn on request of songwriter Mikael Wiehe (a friend and musical collaborator of Afzelius) and on later versions of this album Uggla sings the original lyrics.

== Charts ==
Chart (1987–1988)	Peak position
Swedish Albums (Sverigetopplistan)	2
