= Dansar aldrig nykter =

Single by Magnus Uggla

from the album Alla får påsar
- Released: 1993
- Genre: Pop rock
- Songwriters: Anders Henriksson; Magnus Uggla

Magnus Uggla singles chronology
"4 sekunder" (1993)	"Dansar aldrig nykter" (1993)	"1:a gången" (1993)

"Dansar aldrig nykter" is a song written by Magnus Uggla and Anders Henriksson and recorded by Uggla on his 1993 studio album Alla får påsar.

The single peaked at number 40 on the Swedish singles chart. It also charted on Trackslistan for 12 weeks, between 13 November-29 January 1994. The song also charted at Svensktoppen for eleven weeks between 29 January-9 April 1994, peaking at second position.

Magnus Uggla wrote in 2002 that he likes when the song is performed in front of a jumping audience.

The song title comes from a phrase cited by Cicero: "Nemo enim fere saltat sobrius, nisi forte insanit" ("No one dances sober, unless he is insane").

== Charts ==
Chart (1993)	Peak position
Sweden (Sverigetopplistan)	40
