= Summer park =

Summertime-themed theme park

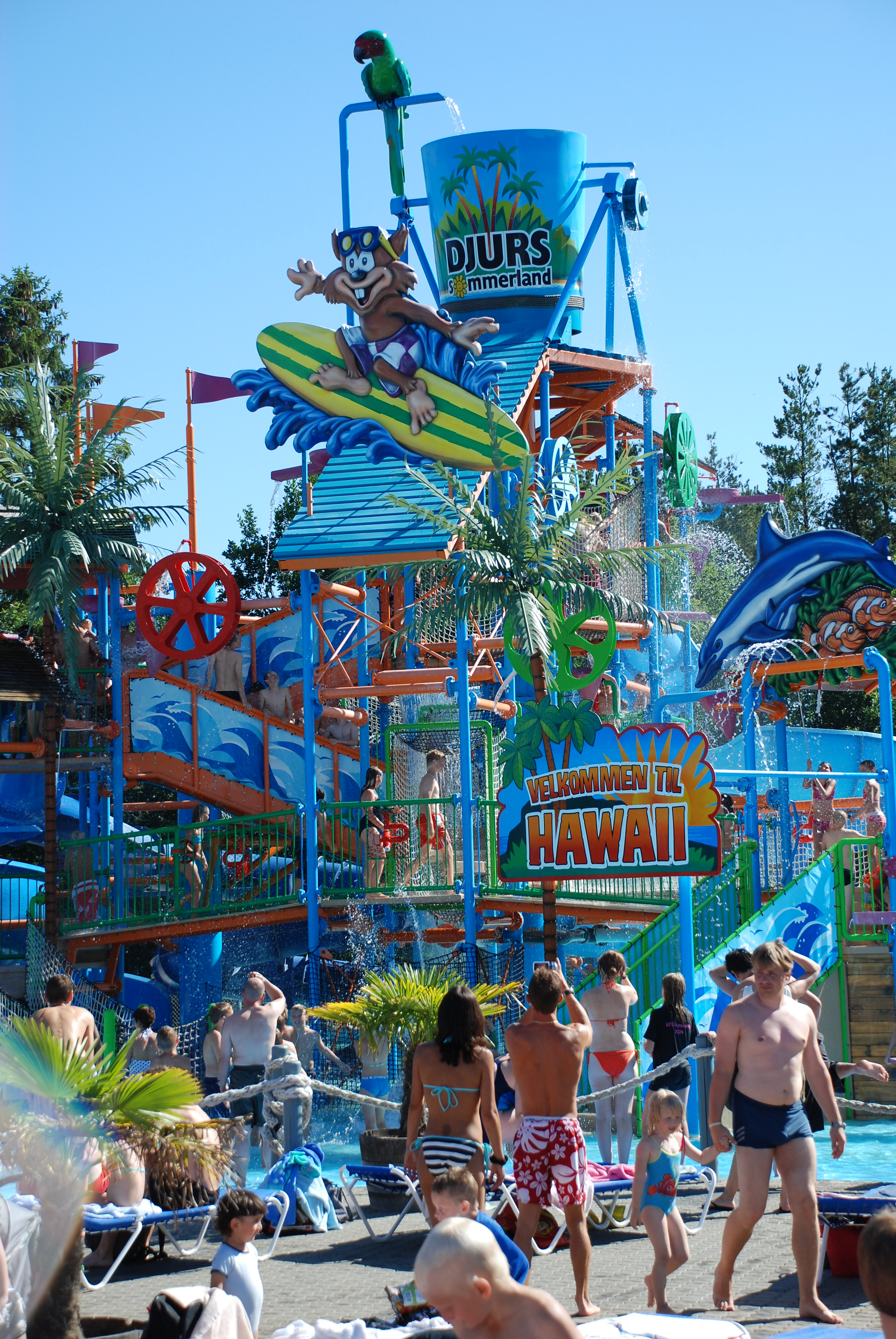
Djurs Sommerland in Denmark.

A summer park is a form of theme park with a summertime theme, open only during the summertime season. Instead of electricity-generated carousels, playgrounds and swimming pools make up most attractions.

In Denmark, several summer parks have been built.

In Sweden, the phenomenon was booming by the mid and late 1980s. After expanding during the economic boom, a decrease began in the early 1990s during the economic recession, but also because of the introduction of a wider entertainment market.
