= Om Bobbo Viking =

Studio album by Magnus Uggla
- Released: January 1975
- Studio: Ljudkopia Musikstudio (Stockholm)
- Genre: Glam rock
- Length: 32:06
- Label: CBS
- Producer: Lasse Gustavsson

Magnus Uggla chronology
| Om Bobbo Viking (1975) | Livets teater (1976) |

Om Bobbo Viking is the debut studio album by Swedish pop and rock artist Magnus Uggla. It was released in 1975. The musicians that perform on the album were originally from Harpo's band.

== Track listing ==
All songs written by Magnus Uggla.

Side one

1. "Hallå" ("Hello") - 3:08
2. "Mrs Space" - 3:00
3. "John Silver" - 2:30
4. "Rock’n roll revolution" - 3:45
5. "Riddarna av mörkret" ("Knights of Darkness") - 3:50

Side two

1. "Bobbo Viking" - 2:24
2. "Flens rock" ("The Rock of Flen") - 2:43
3. "Okänd värld" ("Unknown World") - 3:18
4. "Raggarna" - 3:13
5. "Starlet" - 4:16

== Personnel ==
- Magnus Uggla – vocals
- Roland Hermin – bass
- Kjell Jeppsson – drums
- Finn Sjöberg – guitar, flute
- Anders Olander – keyboard
- Christer Eklund – saxophone
