= Ett bedårande barn av sin tid =

Studio album by Magnus Uggla
- Released: February 2006
- Length: 51:43
- Label: Sony

Magnus Uggla chronology
Den tatuerade generationen (2004)	Ett bedårande barn av sin tid (2006)	Pärlor åt svinen (2007)

Ett bedårande barn av sin tid is the 14th studio album and the second cover album by the Swedish pop rock musician Magnus Uggla. It was released in 2006. The album contains covers of Karl Gerhard songs.

== Track listing ==
1. "Jag är ett bedårande barn av min tid" - 2:58
2. "Desto vackrare blir jag" - 3:16
3. "Förgyll vad du kan förgylla" - 2:27
4. "Vart tar alla vackra flickor vägen" - 2:44
5. "Och så tar vi oss en liten kaka till" - 2:31
6. "Spott ut" - 3:56
7. "Tack ska du ha" - 2:55
8. "Vem vet hur länge vi har varann" - 3:26
9. "Lilla Frida och jag" - 2:26
10. "Nu ska vi vara snälla" - 3:08
11. "En katt bland hermelinerna" - 3:35
12. "Det jämnar alltid ut sig någonstans" - 3:15
13. "Gungorna och karusellen" - 3:04
14. "Hästen från Troja" - 3:01
15. "Jazzgossen" - 2:52
16. "Dom säger på stan" - 3:05
17. "En doft från den fina världen" - 3:04

== Charts ==
Chart (2006)	Peak position
Sweden (Sverigetopplistan)	1
