= Den ljusnande framtid är vår =

- Album cover

Studio album by Magnus Uggla
- Released: July 1980
- Genre: Glam rock
- Length: 40:30
- Label: CBS
- Producer: Anders Eljas, Magnus Uggla

Magnus Uggla chronology
Vittring (1978)	Den ljusnande framtid är vår (1980)	Godkänd pirat (1981)

Den ljusnande framtid är vår is a 1980 studio album by Swedish pop rock musician Magnus Uggla. It was released in July 1980, and is his fifth studio album.

Two international singles were released, "Ain't About to Go Back"/"Scandal Beauties" and "Body Love"/"The Other Side".

"Centrumhets" is a cover of Nick Gilder's "Metro Jets", with new unrelated lyrics in Swedish.

== Track listing ==
Side one

1. "Mitt liv?" ("My Life?") - 4:45
2. "Skandal bjotis – Det är inte kärlek, det är kramp" ("Scandal Beauties - It's Not Love, It's Cramp") - 4:10
3. "Centrumhets" ("Metro Jets") - 4:15
4. "Trendit, trendit" ("Trendy, Trendy") - 3:55
5. "Vi möttes bara för en kväll" ("We Met Only for One Night") - 4:30

Side two

1. "Just den där" ("That Special Someone") - 5:15
2. "Jag vill inte tillbaks" ("Ain't About to Go Back") - 4:15
3. "Panik" ("Panic") - 5:26
4. "Någon som dej – Någon som du är" ("Someone Like You - Someone Like You Are") - 3:59

== Charts ==
Chart (1997–1998)	Peak position
Sweden (Sverigetopplistan)	5
