= Välkommen till folkhemmet =

Studio album by Magnus Uggla
- Released: October 1983
- Genre: Pop rock
- Length: 39:54
- Label: Sonet Grammofon
- Producer: Magnus Uggla

Magnus Uggla chronology
Godkänd pirat (1981)	Välkommen till folkhemmet (1983)	Retrospektivt collage (1985)

Välkommen till folkhemmet is the sixth studio (seventh overall) album by the Swedish pop and rock artist Magnus Uggla. It was released in 1983 and is his first album to focus on what later became his signature sound, pop rock with satirical lyrics. The album was awarded a Rockbjörnen award in the category "Swedish record of the year". The song "IQ" is a cover of Bruce Woolley's "Blue Blue (Victoria)", with new unrelated lyrics in Swedish.

== Track listing ==
All songs written by Magnus Uggla, except where noted.

Arrangements by: Anders Henriksson, Per Lindvall and Peter Ljung.

Side one

1. "Overture / Dumskallarnas julafton" - 2:31
2. "Tjena alena" - 4:47
3. "IQ" - 3:32 (Blue Blue (Victoria), Bruce Woolley)
4. "Krokodil rock" - 5:16
5. "Hand i hand" - 4:40

Side two

1. "Ge ge ge" - 4:49
2. "Hem ljuva hem" - 4:09
3. "Toffelhjältar" - 5:00
4. "Astrologen" - 5:11

== Charts ==
Chart (1983–1984)	Peak position
Sweden (Sverigetopplistan)	1
