= Singles and Selected =

Compilation album by Miss Li
- Released: 7 November 2012
- Recorded: 2006–2011
- Genre: pop
- Label: National

Miss Li chronology
Tangerine Dream (2012)	Singles and Selected (2012)	Wolves (2013)

Singles and Selected was released on 7 November 2012, and is a Miss Li compilation album.

== Track listing ==
1. Dancing the Whole Way Home
2. Bourgeois Shangri-La
3. Boy in the Fancy Suit
4. I Heard of a Girl
5. I Can't Get You off My Mind
6. I'm Sorry He's Mine
7. Ba ba ba
8. My Man
9. Stupid Girl
10. Oh Boy
11. Backstabber lady
12. Forever Drunk
13. You Could Have it (so Much Better without Me)
14. Gotta leave my troubles behind
15. Why Don't You Love Me

== Charts ==
Chart (2013)	Peak position
Swedish Albums (Sverigetopplistan)	15
