= Karaoke (album) =

Studio album by Magnus Uggla
- Released: 22 October 1997
- Recorded: Mid 1997
- Length: 42:39
- Label: Columbia
- Producer: Anders Glenmark

Magnus Uggla chronology
100% Uggla (1994)	Karaoke (1997)	Där jag är e're alltid bäst (2000)

Karaoke is the 11th studio album by Swedish pop and rock artist Magnus Uggla. It was released in 1997. All songs are composed by Uggla and Anders Henriksson. The album was recorded in mid-1997 in Polar Studios in Stockholm, Sweden. The songs "Kompositören" and "Visa" were recorded live at Börsen in Stockholm, 1997.

== Track listing ==
1. "Den bästa publik" - 3:16
2. "Kung för en dag" - 3:16
3. "Jag vill" - 3:43
4. "Gör det" - 3:37
5. "Svensexan" - 3:19
6. "Utan dig" - 3:56
7. "Pom Pom (Magnus Ugglas fanfar)"- 3:55
8. "Bli gay" - 3:28
9. "Bra för att va svensk" - 3:08
10. "En sista dans" - 4:04

Bonus tracks

1. "Kompositören" - 3:15
2. "Visa" (duet with Vanna Rosenberg) - 3:40

== Contributing musicians ==
- Vocals - Magnus Uggla
- Drums and percussion - Marcus Seregård
- Guitars - Christer Fogström and Ville Homqvist
- Bass - Erik Calin
- Keyboards - Johan Eriksson and Anders Glenmark
- Choir - Henrik Rogendahl and Anders Glenmark
- Saxofon - Ruskträsk Johansson
- Strings - S.N.Y.K.O.

== Charts ==
Chart (1997–1998)	Peak position
Swedish Albums (Sverigetopplistan)	1
