= Best of 061122-071122 =

Best of 061122‒071122

Greatest hits album by Miss Li
- Released: 25 December 2007
- Recorded: 2006–2007
- Genre: Pop, jazz fusion, cabaret
- Length: 56:17
- Label: National

Miss Li chronology
Songs of a Rag Doll (2007)	Best of 061122‒071122 (2007)	Dancing the Whole Way Home (2009)

Best of 061122‒071122 is the first compilation album released by Swedish singer-songwriter Miss Li. Released on 25 December 2007, her fourth album in just over a year, the album debuted at No. 29 on the Swedish albums chart, but reached a peak at No. 11 in August 2008.

The first disc is a collection of Miss Li's singles and a few fan favorites, whereas the second disc consists of B-sides and previously unreleased material.

== Track listing ==
=== Disc 1 ===
1. "Oh Boy" – 3:18
2. "Let Her Go" – 2:19
3. "I'm Sorry, He's Mine" – 2:55
4. "Gotta Leave My Troubles Behind" – 2:27
5. "Why Don't You Love Me" – 3:06
6. "High on You" – 3:05
7. "Kings & Queens" – 2:13
8. "Seems Like We Lost It" – 2:58
9. "Leave My Man Alone" – 4:23
10. "Ba Ba Ba" – 3:08
11. "Miss Li" – 4:23

=== Disc 2 ===
1. "I Can't Give You Anything" – 2:48
2. "It Was a Partynight" – 3:10
3. "Like a Holiday" – 3:12
4. "Not the One I Need" – 3:10
5. "I Thought I Knew You" – 2:43
6. "Take Me Back" – 3:42
7. "Good Morning" – 1:47
8. "Upside Down" – 1:30

== Charts ==
=== Weekly charts ===
Chart (2007–08)	Peak position
Swedish Albums (Sverigetopplistan)	11

=== Year-end charts ===
Chart (2008)	Position
Swedish Albums (Sverigetopplistan)	77
