= 35-åringen =

Studio album by Magnus Uggla
- Released: October 1989
- Genre: Pop
- Length: 43:34
- Label: CBS
- Producer: Tomas Ledin

Magnus Uggla chronology
Allting som ni gör kan jag göra bättre (1987)	35-åringen (1989)	Alla får påsar (1993)

35-åringen is the ninth studio album by Swedish pop and rock artist Magnus Uggla. It was released in 1989. The album was awarded a Rockbjörnen award in the category "Swedish record of the year".

== Track listing ==
All lyrics written by Magnus Uggla. All music by Uggla and Anders Henriksson who is also responsible for the arrangements.

Side one

1. "Stig in och ta en cocktail" - 3:55
2. "Baby Boom" - 5:27
3. "P-F" - 4:24
4. "Jätte-kult" - 4:47
5. "Dum dum" - 5:05

Side two

1. "Jag mår illa" - 4:06
2. "Rembrant" - 5:08
3. "Dyra tanter" - 5:12
4. "Moder Svea" - 5:30

The first edition of the LP, MC, and CD contained a song named Stig in och ta en cocktail. Later, another version of it was made, which is a track on a later album. That version was also released as a single.

== Charts ==
Chart (1989–1990)	Peak position
Norwegian Albums (VG-lista)	18
Swedish Albums (Sverigetopplistan)	1
