= Jag är ett bedårande barn av min tid =

Song by Karl Gerhard
- Language: Swedish
- Released: Christmas 1938
- Recorded: Stockholm, Sweden, 18 October 1938
- Genre: popular music
- Composer: Jules Sylvain
- Lyricist: Karl Gerhard

Jag är ett bedårande barn av min tid or Han är ett bedårande barn av sin tid is a song with lyrics by Karl Gerhard and music by Jules Sylvain. It was part of Karl Gerhards jubileumsrevy and recorded by Karl Gerhard in 1938.

In 2006 Magnus Uggla recorded the song on the album Ett bedårande barn av sin tid.
