= Va ska man ta livet av sig för när man ändå inte får höra snacket efteråt? =

- Album cover

Studio album by Magnus Uggla
- Released: September 1977
- Genre: Glam rock; power pop
- Length: 36:29
- Label: CBS
- Producer: Anders Henriksson, Magnus Uggla

Magnus Uggla chronology
Livets teater (1976)	Va ska man ta livet av sig för när man ändå inte får höra snacket efteråt? (1977)	Vittring (1978)

Va ska man ta livet av sig för när man ändå inte får höra snacket efteråt? (English: Why take one's life when one can't even hear the chat afterwards?) is a 1977 studio album by Swedish pop and rock artist Magnus Uggla. It was made available as his third studio album in September 1977. The song "Jag skiter" ("I Don't Give a Damn") became a smash hit. The song "Balladen om 70-talets största rockband" ("The Ballad of the Greatest Rock Band of the '70s") is about a Mott the Hoople concert Magnus Uggla attended in 1971. The song "Varning på stan" ("Danger Downtown") became Uggla's first hit single and was later recorded in English with the name "Hit the Girls on the Run". Uggla has stated that he was inspired by Mott the Hoople's song "All the Way from Memphis" when he wrote "Varning på stan". "Jazzgossen" is a Karl Gerhard cover. The album was produced by the artist himself and his longtime partner Anders Henriksson.

The album was re-released on CD in 1989.

== Track listing ==
Side one

1. "Vår tid" – 1977 ("Our Time - 1977") - 4.19
2. "Varning på stan" ("Warning in the city") - 4.35
3. "Balladen om 70-talets största rockband" ("Ballad of the Greatest Rock Band of the 70's") - 3.40
4. "Jag skiter" ("I Don't Give a Damn") - 3.23
5. "Dörrslusk" - ("Doorscum") 3.38

Side two

1. "På turné" ("On Tour") - 2.55
2. "Ja just du ska va gla" ("Yes, Just You Should Be Glad") - 4.26
3. "Varit kär" ("Been in Love") - 5.27
4. "Jazzgossen" ("The Jazz Boy") - 2.46
5. "Ge livet en chans" ("Give Life a Chance") - 3.00

As bonus tracks, the first edition of the vinyl album contained a 7-inch vinyl with the songs "Va ska man ta livet av sig för när man ändå inte får höra snacket efteråt?" and "Yeh, Why not".

== Singles ==
Two singles were also released

Varning på stan

1. Varning på stan
2. Draget (From Magnus Ugglas 1976 album Livets teater)

Ja just du ska va gla

1. Ja just du ska va gla
2. Ge livet en chans

== Contributing musicians ==
- Magnus Uggla: Vocals, ARP Synthesizers, Piano on "Jag Skiter"
- Anders Henriksson: Piano, Backing Vocals
- Peter Lundblad: Rhythm Guitar
- Lasse Wellander: Lead Guitar
- Backs Hans Erikkson, Jan Bergman, Mike Watson: Bass
- Rolf Alex, Janne Guldbäck
- Janne Kling: Saxophone

== Charts ==
Chart (1977–1978)	Peak position
Sweden (Sverigetopplistan)	1
