= Vittring =

- Album cover

Studio album by Magnus Uggla
- Released: September 1978
- Genre: Pop rock
- Length: 32:39
- Label: CBS
- Producer: Anders Henriksson, Lasse Gustavsson & Magnus Uggla

Magnus Uggla chronology
Va ska man ta livet av sig för när man ändå inte får höra snacket efteråt (1977)	Vittring (1978)	Den ljusnande framtid är vår (1980)

Vittring is a 1978 studio album by Swedish pop and rock artist Magnus Uggla. Released in September 1978, it was his fourth studio album. The album was recorded with the English punk rock band Stadium Dogs.

"Stjärn...r" is a Swedish version of "Star Star" by The Rolling Stones. "Å, han kysste mej" is a cover of "Then He Kissed Me" by The Crystals.

"Vittring", on the other hand was covered by Belgian artist Plastic Bertrand as "Rock'n'roll, je te hais" with completely unrelated lyrics in French.

== Track listing ==
Side one

1. "Drömmen som gick i kras" ("The Dream That Fell Apart") - 1:43
2. "Jag vill inte gå hit" ("I Don't Want to Go Here") - 3:24
3. "Asfaltbarn" ("Concrete Kid") - 2:32
4. "Hjärtekrossare" ("Heartbreaker") - 2:53
5. "Stjärn…r" - 2:23
6. "Faderskapet" ("Paternity") - 3:08

Side two

1. "Nugen" - 2:45
2. "Vittring" ("Scent") - 3:05
3. "Å, han kysste mej" ("Then He Kissed Me") - 2:15
4. "Gud, jag ska bli bra" ("God, I Will Be Good") - 3:58
5. "Lena" - 4:33

== Charts ==
Chart (1978)	Peak position
Swedish Albums (Sverigetopplistan)	7
