= Underbart i all misär =

2021 studio album by Miss Li

Studio album by Miss Li
- Released: 24 September 2021
- Genre: Pop
- Length: 37:01
- Language: Swedish
- Label: Pistol Packin' Music

Miss Li chronology
A Woman's Guide to Survival (2017)	Underbart i all misär (2021)	Livet, döden, skiten däremellan (2024)

Singles from Underbart i all misär
- 1. "Komplicerad" Released: 28 February 2020; 2. "Starkare" Released: 29 May 2020; 3. "Terapi" Released: 2 October 2020; 4. "Förlåt" Released: 22 January 2021; 5. "Instruktionsboken" Released: 23 April 2021; 6. "Utan dig" Released: 20 August 2021

Professional ratings
Review scores
Source	Rating
Aftonbladet	2/5 stars
Borås Tidning	3/5 stars
DI Weekend	4/5 stars
Göteborgs-Posten	4/5 stars

Underbart i all misär (lit. 'wonderful in all the misery') is the ninth studio album by the Swedish singer-songwriter Miss Li. Released on 24 September 2021 by Pistol Packin' Music, its Miss Li's first album in Swedish, her native language. However, a digital-only English version titled Wonderful Misery was released the following month.

== Commercial performance ==
On 1 October 2021, the album peaked at number one on the Sverigetopplistan albums chart.

== Track listing ==
Underbart i all misär track listing
No.	Title	Length
1.	"Tidsmaskin"	4:08
2.	"Komplicerad"	2:39
3.	"Det kommer bli vi"	3:33
4.	"Utan dig"	3:46
5.	"Instruktionsboken"	3:02
6.	"Porslin"	3:51
7.	"Terapi"	2:37
8.	"Förlåt"	3:03
9.	"1:a pris"	3:06
10.	"Starkare"	3:17
11.	"Saknar dig nog mer än jag saknat någon någonsin förut"	3:54
Total length:		37:01

Wonderful Misery track listing
No.	Title	Length
1.	"Complicated"	2:39
2.	"Gonna Be Us"	3:33
3.	"Without You"	3:46
4.	"The Manual"	3:02
5.	"Porcelain"	3:51
6.	"Therapy"	2:38
7.	"Love Me or Leave Me Alone"	3:10
8.	"Sorry"	3:03
9.	"Stronger"	3:18
10.	"Time Machine"	4:10
Total length:		33:16

== Personnel ==
- Linda Karlsson – vocals, handclaps
- Malin-My Wall – fiddle
- Sonny Gustafsson – guitar, percussion, piano, bass, choir
- Thom Bridges – drums, synthesizer, keyboard (track 8)

== Charts ==
Chart performance for Underbart i all misär
Chart (2021)	Peak position
Swedish Albums (Sverigetopplistan)	1
