= Innan filmen tagit slut =

Studio album by Magnus Uggla
- Released: 2 November 2011
- Recorded: EMI
- Genre: Pop rock
- Label: Uggly Music, EMI
- Producer: Peter Kvint

Magnus Uggla chronology
Karl Gerhard passerar i revy (2010)	Innan filmen tagit slut (2011)	Magnus den store (2013)

Innan filmen tagit slut is the 17th studio album by Swedish musician Magnus Uggla, released on 2 November 2011. It is the most recently released studio album by Uggla.

== Track listing ==
Lyrics by Magnus Uggla and music by Anders Henriksson and Magnus Uggla, except where noted otherwise.

1. "Är det så här det ska vara nu" (Magnus Uggla)
2. "Innan filmen tagit slut"
3. "Gör mig till din man"
4. "Leva livet"
5. "Tänker på dig"
6. "Precis en sån är jag" (Magnus Uggla)
7. "Prata prata"
8. "Bara jag får komma hemifrån"
9. "Jag vill ha dig baby"
10. "15 supar"

The songs, "Tänker på dig" and "Jag vill ha dig baby", feature vocals by Edith Backlund.

== Charts ==
=== Weekly charts ===
Chart (2011)	Peak position
Swedish Albums (Sverigetopplistan)	1

=== Year-end charts ===
Chart (2011)	Position
Swedish Albums (Sverigetopplistan)	16
