= Late Night Heartbroken Blues =

Studio album by Miss Li
- Released: 22 November 2006
- Recorded: 2006
- Genre: Pop, jazz fusion, cabaret
- Length: 32:10
- Label: National

Miss Li chronology
Late Night Heartbroken Blues (2006)	God Put a Rainbow in the Sky (2007)

Late Night Heartbroken Blues is the debut studio album release by Swedish singer-songwriter Miss Li. It was released on 22 November 2006 and reached No. 60 on the Swedish albums chart, where it charted for one single week. The album was recorded in A-Stream Studio at Sankt Eriksplan in Stockholm by recording engineer Henrik Åström.

== Track listing ==
1. "Late Night Heartbroken Blues" – 1:56
2. "I'm So Poor Won't You Lend Me Some Money" – 2:38
3. "Hard Loved Man" – 3:07
4. "Give It to Me" – 3:54
5. "Seems Like We Lost It" – 2:58
6. "Oh Boy" – 4:00
7. "High on You" – 3:07
8. "Backstabber Lady" – 2:53
9. "Bring It Back" – 3:43
10. "Miss Li" – 4:24
