= Kung för en dag =

1997 Magnus Uggla song

Single by Magnus Uggla

from the album Karaoke
- Released: 1997
- Genre: Pop rock
- Songwriters: Anders Henriksson; Magnus Uggla

Magnus Uggla singles chronology
| "Trubaduren" (1994) | "Kung för en dag" (1997) | "Jag vill" (1997) |

"Kung för en dag" is the second track of Magnus Uggla's 1997 album Karaoke. It was written by Magnus Uggla together with Anders Henriksson. Lyrically dealing with partying when the wage arrives for the month, the song was the album's major hit. The music video shows Olle Sarri acting as partying.

The single peaked at 4th position at the Swedish singles chart and also charted at Svensktoppen for eight weeks between 11 October-29 November 1997, peaking at number five. The song also charted at Trackslistan for four weeks between 13 September-4 October 1997, peaking at eighth position.

On 1 July 2008, when Uggla appeared as guest, the song was performed as a sing-along song at Allsång på Skansen on 1 July 2008. On 7 July 2009, when Uggla appeared together with Rolandz, the song was once again performed as a sing-along song.

The song also became recurring at TV3's Baren.

== Other performances ==
At Dansbandskampen 2008 the song was performed by Larz-Kristerz.

== Charts ==
| Chart (1997–1998) | Peak position |
|---|---|
| Sweden (Sverigetopplistan) | 4 |
