= Dancing the Whole Way Home =

Studio album by Miss Li
- Released: 31 March 2009
- Recorded: 2009
- Genre: Indie pop, cabaret
- Length: 35:45
- Label: National

Miss Li chronology
Best of 061122‒071122 (2007)	Dancing the Whole Way Home (2009)	Beats & Bruises (2011)

Singles from Dancing the Whole Way Home
- 1. "I Heard of a Girl" Released: 2009; 2. "Dancing the Whole Way Home" Released: 2009; 3. "Stupid Girl" Released: 2009; 4. "Bourgeois Shangri-La" Released: 2009

Dancing the Whole Way Home is the fourth studio album release by Swedish Singer-songwriter Miss Li. The album debuted and peaked at No. 8 on the Swedish Albums Chart on 10 April 2009. The song "Bourgeois Shangri-la" was featured in the 2009 Apple iPod commercial, and the song contains a sample from "Count Me In" by Gary Lewis & the Playboys.

== Track listing ==
1. "I Heard of a Girl" – 2:45
2. "Dirty Old Man" – 3:02
3. "True Love Stalker" – 3:14
4. "Polythene Queen" – 3:34
5. "Is This the End" – 3:28
6. "Dancing the Whole Way Home" – 2:49
7. "Stuck in the Sand" – 3:45
8. "A Daughter or a Son" – 4:30
9. "Bourgeois Shangri-La" – 2:48
10. "The Boy in the Fancy Suit" – 3:12
11. "Stupid Girl" – 4:38
