= Songs of a Rag Doll =

Studio album by Miss Li
- Released: 17 October 2007
- Recorded: 2007
- Genre: Pop, jazz fusion, cabaret
- Length: 30:14
- Label: National

Miss Li chronology
God Put a Rainbow in the Sky (2007)	Songs of a Rag Doll (2007)	Best of 061122‒071122 (2007)

Songs of a Rag Doll is the third studio album release by Swedish Singer-songwriter Miss Li. It was released on 17 October 2007, only five months after the release of God Put a Rainbow in the Sky. The album debuted and peaked at number 23 on the Swedish Albums Chart.

== Track listing ==
1. "Why Don't You Love Me" – 3:28
2. "Gotta Leave My Troubles Behind" – 2:25
3. "Take a Shower!" – 3:04
4. "Come Over to My Place" – 2:44
5. "Tuck You In" – 2:43
6. "Leave My Man Alone" – 4:23
7. "Why Should I Conquer the World" – 3:45
8. "Ba Ba Ba" – 3:34
9. "Trouble Rumble" – 0:47
10. "Not That Kind of Girl" – 3:21

== Charts ==
Chart (2007)	Peak position
Swedish Albums (Sverigetopplistan)	23
