= Karl Gerhard passerar i revy =

Studio album by Magnus Uggla
- Released: 29 October 2010
- Length: 42 minutes
- Language: Swedish
- Label: Sony BMG Music Entertainment
- Producer: Jesper Nordenström

Magnus Uggla chronology
Pärlor åt svinen (2007)	Karl Gerhard passerar i revy (2010)	Innan filmen tagit slut (2011)

Karl Gerhard passerar i revy is the 16th studio album and the third cover album by Swedish musician Magnus Uggla. It was released on 29 October 2010. It is the second of two Uggla albums in which he sings songs by the Swedish 20th century revue king Karl Gerhard.

== Track listing ==
1. "God afton vackra mask"
2. "Lite gullregn"
3. "I de ökända kvarteren i det ruskiga Marseille"
4. "Alla de gamla fina märkena"
5. "Kan du tänka dig honom utan hår? (Jag kan det inte)"
6. "Bom"
7. "(Det ska vara) Feda breda pågar"
8. "Den siste mohikanen"
9. "Axlarna ska slutta"
10. "Handarbetsvisan"
11. "Mitt hjärta"
12. "Hälsa Ada"
13. "Mops i mattes knä"

== Personnel ==
- Jesper Nordenström – Producer
- Per Lindvall – Drums
- Robert Östlund – Guitar
- Andreas Unge – Double bass
- Ulf Forsberg – Violin
