= Pärlor åt svinen =

Studio album by Magnus Uggla
- Released: 24 October 2007
- Genre: Pop
- Label: Uggly
- Producer: Anders Hansson, Peter Månsson

Magnus Uggla chronology
| Ett bedårande barn av sin tid (2006) | Pärlor åt svinen (2007) | Karl Gerhard passerar i revy (2010) |

Pärlor åt svinen (which translates as Pearls Before Swine) is the 15th studio album by the Swedish musician Magnus Uggla. It was released on 24 October 2007. The album contains the singles "Pärlor åt svin", "Vild och skild" and "För kung och fosterland".

All lyrics by Magnus Uggla and music by Anders Henriksson och Magnus Uggla, except where listed.

== Track listing ==
1. "Åh vilken härlig dag" - 3:57
2. "Tvättbräda" - 3:38
3. "Fredagskväll på Hallen" - 4:07
4. "Pärlor åt svin" - 4:08
5. "Vild och skild" - 3:23
6. "Borta bra men hemma bäst" - 2:53
7. "Det är vårt liv" - 3:28
8. "Coverbandens förlovade land" - 3:11
9. "Min igen" - 3:37
10. "Du och jag mot hela världen" - 4:11
11. "För kung och fosterland" - 3:01

== Personnel ==
- Peter Månsson - Drums, percussion, guitars, bass
- Anders Hansson - Keyboards
- Tommy Braic - Bass
- Jesper Nordenström - Piano
- Staffan Astner - Guitar and bass
- Erik Arvinder - Violin and viola
- Henrik Söderquist - Cello
- Peter Asplund - Trumpet
- Emil Heiling, Jeanetta Olsson, Emma Tyra Märta & Sofie, Magnus Rongedal och Magnus Uggla - Choir
- Emil Heiling - Choir arrangement
- Erik Arvinder - String arrangement

== Charts ==
| Chart (2007–2008) | Peak position |
|---|---|
| Swedish Albums (Sverigetopplistan) | 2 |
