= Den döende dandyn (album) =

Studio album by Magnus Uggla
- Released: October 1986
- Studio: Polar Studios AB
- Genre: Synth-pop
- Length: 40:41
- Label: CBS
- Producer: Peter Ljung & Anders Henriksson

Magnus Uggla chronology
Collection (1986)	Den döende dandyn (1986)	Allting som ni gör kan jag göra bättre (1987)

Den döende dandyn ("The dying dandy") is the seventh studio album by Swedish pop and rock artist Magnus Uggla. It was released in 1986. The album was awarded a Rockbjörnen award in the category "Swedish record of the year". "Herr servitör" is a cover of Nick Gilder's "Worlds Collide", with new unrelated lyrics in Swedish. The song "Joey Killer" mocks the glam metal subculture, which gained much popularity during the middle to late 1980s. Den döende dandyn peaked at number one on the Swedish Albums Chart.

== Track listing ==
- All songs written by Magnus Uggla, except where noted.

Side one

1. "Staffans matematik" 4:53
2. "Joey Killer" 4:29
3. "Rumpnissar" 5:02
4. "Varje gång jag ser dig" 4:58

Side two

1. "Fula gubbar" 4:17 (Uggla, G.P. Telemann)
2. "Herr servitör (Worlds Collide)" 4:50 (Uggla, James McCulloch, Nick Gilder)
3. "Mattläggar-Oves hjulsång" 4:16
4. "Passionsfrukt" 3:49
5. "Den döende dandyn" 4:07
  - Note: The chorus of the song "Fula Gubbar" is inspired by a choral work from Georg Philipp Telemann.

== Personnel ==
- Magnus Uggla: Main Vocal
- Henrik Jansson: Guitars
- Peter Ljung: Bass, Keyboards
- Per Lindwall: Drums, Percussion, Drum Programming
- Staffan Birkenfalk, Benna Sörman, Nysse Nyström: Vocal Backing and Choir
- RSO: Strings, String Arrangements

== Production ==
- Arranged and Produced by Peter Ljung and Anders Henriksson
- Recording and Mix by Kaj Erixon
- All songs published by Uggly Music, except track 6 (EMI Music Publishing Sweden)

== Charts ==
Chart (1986)	Peak position
Swedish Albums (Sverigetopplistan)	1

== Certifications ==
Region	Certification	Certified units/sales
Sweden (GLF)	3× Platinum	300,000^{^}
^{^} Shipments figures based on certification alone.
