= Alla får påsar =

Studio album by Magnus Uggla
- Released: October 1993
- Genre: Pop rock
- Length: 46:19
- Label: Columbia
- Producer: Anders Glenmark

Magnus Uggla chronology
35-åringen (1989)	Alla får påsar (1993)	100% Uggla (1994)

Alla får påsar is the tenth studio album by the Swedish pop and rock artist Magnus Uggla. It was released in 1993. Alla får påsar has been released on CD as well as streaming services. The album was awarded a Rockbjörnen award in the category "Swedish record of the year". The album proved successful in Sweden, peaking at number one on the Swedish Albums Chart.

Lyrics by Magnus Uggla and music by Anders Henriksson and Uggla.

== Track listing ==
1. "Mitt decennium" - 4:31
2. "Jånni Balle" - 3:08
3. "Vi 2 (Till dom otrogna)" - 4:03
4. "Victoria" - 4:15
5. "Trubaduren" - 5:12
6. "Nummer 1" - 4:09
7. "2:a på bollen" - 4:01
8. "4 sekunder" - 4:04
9. "Dansar aldrig nykter" - 3:39
10. "1:a gången" - 3:15
11. "Jånni Balle" (maxi-version) - 6:02

== Charts ==
Chart (1993–1994)	Peak position
Sweden (Sverigetopplistan)	1
