= Vem kan man lita på? =

Song by Hoola Bandoola Band

from the album Vem kan man lita på?
- Language: Swedish
- Released: November 1972
- Recorded: August 1972
- Genre: Rock, progg
- Songwriter: Mikael Wiehe

"Vem kan man lita på?" is a song written by Mikael Wiehe, and recorded by the Hoola Bandoola Band on the album Vem kan man lita på?.

Wiehe has said that finding the right words for the lyrics went quickly. He also said that the song is about "trust, confidence and traitors".

In 1987, the song was recorded by Magnus Uggla, on the album Allting som ni gör kan jag göra bättre, and charted at Svensktoppen for three weeks between 31 January-14 February 1988, with the positions 3-2-2. The Magnus Uggla version peaked at 12th position on the Swedish singles chart.

In the original Magnus Uggla recording, the line "och Robert Zimmerman flytt till landet med miljonerna" ("and Robert Zimmerman fled out of the country with the millions [of money]") replaced with "och Björn Afzelius flytt har till Italien med miljonerna" ("and Björn Afzelius fled to Italy with the millions [of money]"). When Mikael Wiehe threatened to sue Magnus Uggla, the song lyrics were replaced with the original lines.

Marie Fredriksson recorded the song on her 2006 album Min bäste vän.

A Så mycket bättre version by Lena Philipsson was criticized by the Royalist Association when the lines när prinsar och presidenter ljuger medvetet i kapp (when princes and presidents knowingly compete to lie) with när kungen och hans vänner ljuger medvetet i kapp (when the king and his friends knowingly compete to lie).

== Charts ==
=== Magnus Uggla version ===
Chart (1987–1988)	Peak position
Sweden (Sverigetopplistan)	12
