= A Woman's Guide to Survival =

Studio album by Miss Li
- Released: 24 November 2017
- Genre: Indie pop
- Length: 36:14
- Labels: Pistol Packin' Music; Sony

Miss Li chronology
Wolves (2013)	A Woman's Guide to Survival (2017)	Underbart i all misär (2021)

Singles from A Woman's Guide to Survival
- 1. "Bonfire" Released: 16 August 2016; 2. "The Day I Die (I Want You to Celebrate)" Released: 6 October 2016; 3. "Aqualung" Released: 21 January 2017; 4. "Love Hurts" Released: 19 May 2017

A Woman's Guide to Survival is the eighth studio album by Swedish singer and songwriter Miss Li, released in 2017 through Sony Music Sweden.

== Reception ==
Professional ratings
Review scores
Source	Rating
Aftonbladet	3/4 stars
Expressen	3/5 stars

Natasha Azarmi of Aftonbladet wrote of the album that Li's "strength is even clearer. She sounds fearless, stubborn and determined. Now it's the anger that carries her forward. The tangible joy that has previously been a sign is only heard on a few occasions."

== Track listing ==
No.	Title	Writer(s)	Length
1.	"AWGTS"	Linda Karlsson; Sonny Gustafsson; Kyle Puccia	1:16
2.	"Pressure"	Karlsson; Gustafsson; Puccia	2:57
3.	"Aqualung"	Karlsson; Gustafsson; Marli Harwood	3:34
4.	"You Only"	Karlsson; Gustafsson; Puccia	2:59
5.	"Beautiful"	Karlsson; Gustafsson	3:29
6.	"Dangerous"	Karlsson; Gustafsson; Nea Nelson	3:28
7.	"The Day I Die (I Want You to Celebrate)"	Karlsson; Gustafsson; Puccia	3:36
8.	"Hurricane"	Karlsson; Gustafsson; Puccia	4:03
9.	"Love Hurts"	Karlsson; Gustafsson	3:27
10.	"Chasing Expectations"	Karlsson; Gustafsson; Puccia	0:16
11.	"Bonfire"	Karlsson; Gustafsson; Puccia	3:31
12.	"Seduce Me Slowly"	Karlsson; Gustafsson; Mattias Franda	3:38
Total length:			36:14

== Personnel ==
- Linda Karlsson – vocals, piano
- Sonny Gustafsson – production
- Lasse Mårtén – mixing, engineering (3, 11)
- Aryan Marzban – mixing (9)
- Tom Coyne – engineering (9)

== Charts ==
Chart (2017)	Peak position
Swedish Albums (Sverigetopplistan)	27
