= Fula gubbar =

1986 Magnus Uggla song

Single by Magnus Uggla

from the album Den döende dandyn
- A-side: "Magnus Uggla"
- Released: 1986
- Genre: pop rock
- Songwriter: Magnus Uggla

Magnus Uggla singles chronology
"Joey Killer" (1986)	"Fula gubbar" (1986)	"Vem kan man lita på?" (1987)

"Fula gubbar" is a song written and recorded by Magnus Uggla on his 1986 studio album Den döende dandyn.

== Background ==
While lyrically dealing with older men's attraction to younger girls, the simple tune made the song popular among young children, leading to it being referred to as "Kindergarten pop". The inspiration was taken from "Ceciderunt in profundum", a Georg Philipp Telemann choir composition. While writing the song, Uggla wanted to write pop music in the same spirit as Wendy Carlos.

== Commercial performance ==
The single peaked at number four on the Swedish singles chart. The song also charted at Trackslistan, where it stayed for four weeks between 6 December 1986 – 7 January 1987, peaking at number four. The song also charted at Svensktoppen for 12 weeks between 23 November 1986–15 February 1987, topping the chart during the first six weeks.

== Other information ==
A 2006 Musikministeriet report showed similarities between the Georg Philipp Telemann composition, and the Björnes magasin opening music, as Björnes magasin aired for first time in 1987, the after "Fula gubbar" was popular.

== Charts ==
Chart (1986)	Peak position
Sweden (Sverigetopplistan)	4
