= Tangerine Dream (Miss Li album) =

Studio album by Miss Li
- Released: 10 October 2012
- Genre: Pop
- Label: EMI

Miss Li chronology
Beats & Bruises (2011)	Tangerine Dream (2012)	Singles and Selected (2012)

Tangerine Dream is the sixth studio album by Swedish singer-songwriter Miss Li, released on 10 October 2012.

== Track listing ==
1. Teenager for Life - 3:47
2. Plastic Faces - 3:13
3. Respected Old Man - 3:27
4. Golden Retriever - 3:44
5. All Those Men - 3:05
6. A Darker Side of Me - 3:42
7. It Ain't Over - 2:47
8. My Heart Goes Boom - 3:24
9. Throw It in the Trash Can - 3:20
10. Clever Words - 5:4

== Charts ==
=== Weekly charts ===
Chart (2012–2013)	Peak position
German Albums (Offizielle Top 100)	91
Swedish Albums (Sverigetopplistan)	11

=== Year-end charts ===
Chart (2012)	Position
Swedish Albums (Sverigetopplistan)	91
