= Beats & Bruises =

Studio album by Miss Li
- Released: 16 March 2011
- Genre: pop
- Length: 41:39

Miss Li chronology
Dancing the Whole Way Home (2009)	Beats & Bruises (2011)	Tangerine Dream (2012)

Beats & Bruises is the fifth studio album by Swedish singer-songwriter Miss Li, released on 16 March 2011.

== Track listing ==
1. Devil's Taken Her Man
2. I Can't Get You Off My Mind
3. My Man
4. Shoot Me
5. You Could Have It (So Much Better Without Me)
6. Forever Drunk
7. Hit It
8. Arrested
9. Billy's Got A Gun
10. Modern Family
11. Are You Happy Now

== Charts ==
Chart (2011)	Peak position
Swedish Albums (Sverigetopplistan)	13
