= Magnus Uggla Band sjunger schlagers =

EP by Magnus Uggla Band
- Released: March 1979
- Genres: Pop, Punk rock, Schlager

Magnus Uggla Band sjunger schlagers is a 1979 EP from Swedish pop and rock group Magnus Uggla Band. It was released in March 1979 and all songs, except Johnny the Rucker, are covers.

== Track listing ==
1. Johnny the Rucker
2. Leva livet
3. Ring ring
4. Mälarö kyrka
