= God Put a Rainbow in the Sky =

Studio album by Miss Li
- Released: 2 May 2007
- Recorded: 2007
- Genre: Pop, Jazz fusion, Cabaret
- Length: 33:10
- Label: National

Miss Li chronology
Late Night Heartbroken Blues (2006)	God Put a Rainbow in the Sky (2007)	Songs of a Rag Doll (2007)

God Put a Rainbow in the Sky is the second studio album by Swedish singer-songwriter Miss Li. It was released on 2 May 2007, and debuted at number 42 on the Swedish Albums Chart, while reaching its peak position of number 29, when it reentered the chart in July the same year.

== Track listing ==
1. "Let Her Go" - 2:19
2. "All I Need Is You" - 1:51
3. "I'm Glad I'm Not a Proud American" - 3:05
4. "Don't Try to Fool Me" - 3:41
5. "Autumn Cold" - 2:05
6. "I'm Sorry, He's Mine" - 2:55
7. "The Songs We Used to Sing" - 3:44
8. "Kings & Queens" - 2:11
9. "The Happy Sinner" - 4:58
10. "A Song About Me and a Boy" - 6:49
