= Baby Boom (song) =

Single by Magnus Uggla

from the album 35-åringen
- Released: 1989
- Genre: Pop rock
- Songwriters: Magnus Uggla, Anders Henriksson

Magnus Uggla singles chronology
"Jag mår illa" (1989)	"Baby Boom" (1989)	"Dum, dum" (1989)

"Baby Boom" is a song written by Magnus Uggla and Anders Henriksson, and recorded by Uggla on his album 35-åringen, released in 1989. The song's lyrics describe baby booming during the late 1980s economic boom in Sweden. The single peaked at number 15 on the Swedish singles chart. The song also charted at Trackslistan, where it stayed for five weeks between 2 December 1989 – 6 January 1990, peaking at 12th position. It also charted for 14 weeks at Svensktoppen, from late 1989 up to 1 April 1990.

== Charts ==
Chart (1989)	Peak position
Sweden (Sverigetopplistan)	15
