= Jag mår illa =

Single by Magnus Uggla

from the album 35-åringen
- A-side: "Jag mår illa"
- Released: 1989
- Genre: Pop rock
- Songwriters: Magnus Uggla and Anders Henriksson

Magnus Uggla singles chronology
"Ska vi gå hem till dig" (1987)	"Jag mår illa" (1989)	"Baby Boom" (1989)

Music video
- "Jag mår illa" on YouTube

"Jag mår illa" (in English: "I Feel Sick") is a song written by Swedish artist, composer and actor Magnus Uggla and Anders Henriksson, and recorded by Magnus Uggla for his 1989 album 35-åringen. With lyrics satirizing celebrity culture and gossip magazines, the song reached Svensktoppen on 17 September 1989, peaking at number nine on the Norwegian singles chart, while topping the Swedish singles chart. Uggla wrote the song for a screenplay of a film that was never produced. Swedish radio program Metropol appointed the song "Best Swedish song of the 1980s".

== Charts ==
Chart (1989)	Peak position
Europe (Eurochart Hot 100)	64
Finland (Suomen virallinen lista)	24
Norway (VG-lista)	9
Sweden (Sverigetopplistan)	1
