= Den tatuerade generationen =

Studio album by Magnus Uggla
- Released: 6 October 2004
- Length: 38:21
- Label: Columbia
- Producer: Peter Kvint, Simon Nordberg

Magnus Uggla chronology
| Klassiska mästerverk (2002) | Den tatuerade generationen (2004) | Ett bedårande barn av sin tid (2006) |

Den tatuerade generationen is the 13th studio album by Swedish pop rock musician Magnus Uggla. The album was released on 6 October 2004. It reached number one on the Swedish Albums Chart. Notable tracks include "Värsta grymma tjejen", "Nu har pappa laddat bössan" and "Efterfest".

All lyrics by Magnus Uggla and music by Anders Henriksson och Magnus Uggla, except where listed.

== Track listing ==
1. "Magnuspassionen" - 2:00
2. "Dödens ort" - 3:25
3. "Efterfest" - 4:17
4. "Värsta grymma tjejen" - 3:06
5. "Det är tanken som räkna" - 3:46
6. "Minnena av dig" - 3:50 (Magnus Uggla)
7. "Nu har pappa laddat bössan" - 3:56
8. "Ta in ett helrör" - 3:26 (Magnus Uggla)
9. "Greatest Hits" - 3:47
10. "Stans värsta plåster" - 2:45
11. "Varning på stan enligt Bellman" - 3:04

== Charts ==
=== Weekly charts ===
| Chart (2004–2005) | Peak position |
|---|---|
| Swedish Albums (Sverigetopplistan) | 1 |

=== Year-end charts ===
| Chart (2004) | Position |
|---|---|
| Swedish Albums (Sverigetopplistan) | 8 |
| Chart (2005) | Position |
| Swedish Albums (Sverigetopplistan) | 56 |
