= Joey Killer =

1986 Magnus Uggla song

Single by Magnus Uggla

from the album Den döende dandyn
- A-side: "Magnus Uggla"
- Released: 1986
- Genre: Pop rock
- Songwriters: Anders Henriksson; Magnus Uggla

Magnus Uggla singles chronology
"Retrospektivt college" (1985)	"Joey Killer" (1986)	"Fula gubbar" (1986)

"Joey Killer" is a song written and recorded by Magnus Uggla for his 1986 studio album Den döende dandyn.

The song's lyrics depict an era where heavy metal had become popular, and shows a typical "metalhead" trying to act tough, really wanting to be with his mother.

Many people thought Joey Killer was intended to be Joey Tempest from the band Europe, but Uggla said that he got the idea from seeing Ola Håkansson during a rehearsal with Noice, playing "I natt e hela stan vår" loud, when the door suddenly was opened up, and his mother stood there with buns and chocolate.

== Chart performance ==
The single topped the Swedish singles chart between 24 September and 5 November 1986, becoming Uggla's first number-one single in Sweden.

The song also charted at Trackslistan for five weeks between 20 September 1986 – 17 January 1987, topping the chart during the second and third position. The song also charted at Svensktoppen for nine weeks between 12 October–7 December 1986, peaking at second position during the six first weeks. With the song, Uggla had reached both Svensktoppen and Trackslistan for the first time.

== Charts ==
Chart (1986)	Peak position
Sweden (Sverigetopplistan)	1

== Certifications ==
Region	Certification	Certified units/sales
Sweden (GLF)	3× Platinum	150,000^{^}
^{^} Shipments figures based on certification alone.
