= Där jag är e're alltid bäst =

Där jag är e’re alltid bäst

Studio album by Magnus Uggla
- Released: 18 October 2000
- Genre: Pop
- Length: 44:26
- Label: Sony
- Producer: Peter Kvint, Simon Nordberg

Magnus Uggla chronology
Karaoke (1997)	Där jag är e’re alltid bäst (2000)	Klassiska mästerverk (2002)

Där jag är e’re alltid bäst (English: Where I Am It Is Always Best) is the twelfth studio album by Swedish pop and rock artist Magnus Uggla. It was released in 2000. The album cover art is a spoof on the cover of the classic album Slayed? by Slade. The album became successful in Sweden, charting on the Swedish Albums Chart for 23 weeks, peaking at number one. It was subsequently certified 2 x platinum in the country.

== Track listing ==
All songs written by Magnus Uggla and Anders Henriksson, except for "Kan det vara kärlek", which is written entirely by Uggla.

1. "Stockholms heta nätter" - 3:35
2. "Nitar och läder" - 4:03
3. "Dumma flickor" - 3:40
4. "Morsan e’ okej" - 3:23
5. "Stockholms största teaser" - 3:44
6. "Hotta brudar" - 3:08
7. "I hela världen" - 4:34
8. "Testosteron" - 3:53
9. "Inte alls förbannad" - 2:38
10. "Kan det vara kärlek" - 3:01 (Magnus Uggla)
11. "Klättermusen" - 4:11
12. "I himmelen" - 3:46

== Singles ==
The songs, "Nitar & läder", "Hotta brudar", "Morsan é okej" and "Stockholms heta nätter", were released as singles.

== Charts ==
Chart (2000)	Peak position	Certification
Swedish Albums (Sverigetopplistan)	1	GLF: 2 x Platinum
