= Blue Blue (Victoria) =

1980 song by Bruce Woolley

Song by Bruce Woolley
- Language: English
- Released: 1980
- Genre: Pop
- Songwriter: Bruce Woolley

"Blue Blue (Victoria)" is a song written and recorded by English musician Bruce Woolley in 1980. It would later be included on the 2009 reissue to his debut studio album, English Garden (1979). It would notably be covered by Swedish singer Magnus Uggla, under the name "IQ". Uggla's version was more successful, peaking at number 2 on the Sverigetopplistan.

== Magnus Uggla version ==
Magnus Uggla wrote lyrics in Swedish as "IQ", recording it for his 1983 album Välkommen till folkhemmet. He wrote the song's lyrics after being kicked out from Café Opera. The single peaked at number two on the Swedish Singles Chart.

=== Single track listing ===
1. IQ (Blue Blue (Victoria))
2. Raggare

== Charts ==
=== Magnus Uggla version ===
Chart (1983–1984)	Peak position
Sweden (Sverigetopplistan)	2
