= Mitt decennium =

Single by Magnus Uggla

from the album Alla får påsar
- Released: 1993
- Genre: Pop rock
- Length: 4:31
- Songwriters: Anders Henriksson; Magnus Uggla

Magnus Uggla singles chronology
"Victoria" (1994)	"Mitt decennium" (1993)	"Trubaduren" (1994)

"Mitt decennium" is the first track on Magnus Uggla's 1993 album Alla får påsar. The song's lyrics describes the situation in early 1990s Sweden following the financial crash. While many in Sweden were looking backwards to the mid-late 1980s successful financial situations in Sweden, Magnus Uggla sings in the chorus that looking backwards is no use, instead he looks to the future. After all, he is in "his" own decade. A music video was subsequently released for the song.

Magnus Uggla himself has referred to the melody as one of his and Anders Henriksson’s better compositions.

The song became a Trackslistan success, charting for 17 weeks.
