= Hand i hand =

Song by Magnus Uggla

from the album Välkommen till folkhemmet
- Language: Swedish
- Released: 1983
- Genre: pop
- Songwriter: Magnus Uggla

"Hand i hand" is a song written by Magnus Uggla, and performed by him on his 1983 album Välkommen till folkhemmet. The chorus are taken from Pyotr Ilyich Tchaikovsky's violin concert. The song's lyrics reflect upon the hippie movement during the political left-wave in the Western World during the years around 1970. Living for 10 years inside a flat at Västerlånggatan in Gamla stan, Uggla would sometimes be awakened by songs like El Cóndor Pasa. He would sometimes reply by playing heavy metal.

== Other version ==
In 1998, a new version was released, together with Dogge Doggelito, peaking at number 47 on the Swedish Singles Chart.

== In popular culture ==
Within the world of sports, the chorus is sometimes used as a cheering chant. It is sung:

- Heja X-lag, tillsammans skall vi kämpa på. Krossa Y-lag. Vi älskar X-lag.

meaning:

- Go X-team, together, we'll fight. Crush Y team. We love X team.

== Charts ==
=== 1998 version ===
| Chart (1998) | Peak position |
|---|---|
| Sweden (Sverigetopplistan) | 47 |
