= Jag skiter =

Song by Magnus Uggla

from the album Va ska man ta livet av sig för när man ändå inte får höra snacket efteråt
- Released: September 1977
- Genre: punk, rock
- Songwriter: Magnus Uggla

Magnus Uggla chronology
"Varning på stan" (1977)	"Jag skiter" (1977)	"Yeh, Why Not" (1978)

"Jag skiter" is a song written and recorded by Magnus Uggla for the album Va ska man ta livet av sig för när man ändå inte får höra snacket efteråt in 1977.

The song lyrics encourage not to just listen to what other people think about someone, and also tackles the adult society's requests from the adult world. The song caused controversy, though Magnus Uggla himself said he didn't understand why, since the song was written in a humorist way, based on a joke he'd read in a Nisse Strix issue, ("de säger att jag skiter i allt, men det skiter jag i!" ^{Translation: They say I don't give a damn about anything, but I don't give a damn about that}).

In 2003, the song was recorded by Grynet. The recording was released as a single, which peaked at number two on the Swedish Singles Chart. This version replaced the lines De är bögar allihopa with De är puckon allihopa.

== Charts ==
=== Grynet version ===
Chart (2003–2004)	Peak position
Sweden (Sverigetopplistan)	2
