= Vittring (song) =

Single by Magnus Uggla

from the album Vittring
- A-side: "Vittring"
- B-side: "Hallå"
- Released: 1978
- Genre: pop rock punk rock
- Label: Columbia
- Songwriter: Magnus Uggla

Vittring singles chronology
"Ja just du ska va gla" (1978)	"Vittring" (1978)	"Magnus Uggla Band sjunger schlagers" (1979)

Vittring is a song written by Magnus Uggla, and recorded by himself on the 1978 album Vittring. It was also released as a single the same year. Uggla subsequently recorded a version with lyrics in English, titled "Everything You Do".

The single peaked at 12th position on the Swedish singles chart, but Magnus Uggla himself said it failed.

== Charts ==
Chart (1978)	Peak position
Sweden (Sverigetopplistan)	12
