= Olle Ljungström =

Swedish singer, songwriter, and musician

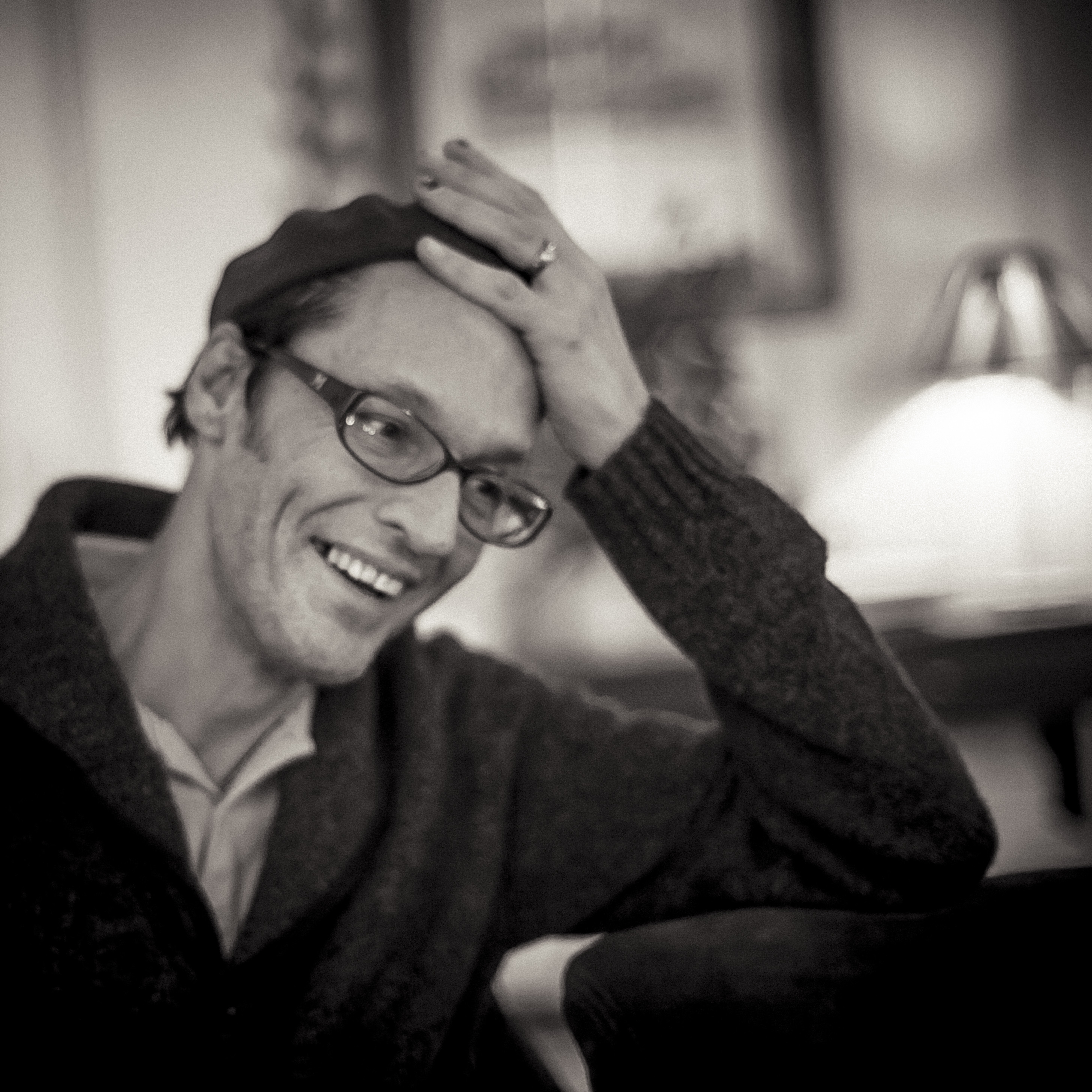
- Olle Ljungström in 2012.

Background information
- Also known as: KW
- Born: Lars Olof Gustaf Ljungström; 12 August 1961; Sweden
- Died: 4 May 2016 (aged 54) Alingsås, Sweden
- Occupations: Singer, songwriter, musician
- Instruments: Vocals, guitar
- Years active: 1977 – 2016
- Formerly of: Reeperbahn

Lars Olof "Olle" Gustaf Ljungström (12 August 1961 – 4 May 2016) was a Swedish singer, songwriter, and musician. Ljungström grew up in Vaxholm. He was vocalist and guitarist in the group Reeperbahn from 1979 to 1984; since the early 1990s he performed solo.

== Reeperbahn ==
Ljungström began his musical career as vocalist and guitarist in the Swedish rock group Reeperbahn. The group, which initially also consisted of Dan Sundquist (bass), Eddie Sjöberg (guitar) and Peter Korhonen (drums), made their self-titled debut album in 1979. On their first LP, Reeperbahn used both Swedish and English lyrics, but later on settled for only Swedish songs. The group made three more full-length albums, Venuspassagen (1981), Peep-Show (1983) and Intriger (1983) before splitting up in 1984.

== Heinz and Young ==
After Reeperbahn, Ljungström briefly formed a duo named Heinz & Young with Heinz Liljedahl (from the band Ratata). The duo released only one album entitled Buzzbuzzboys... in 1984, with only English lyrics. The album included compositions by both artists with the double A-side single "No Matter at All" / "California dreamin'" released as a 7" single.

Liljedahl has also collaborated with Ljungström on the latter's first six solo albums 1993-2002.

== Solo career ==
In 1993, Ljungström made his debut as a solo performer with a self-titled album. He was first signed to MNW and later on to Metronome. As a solo performer, Ljungström sang in Swedish.

Ljungström has also appeared on songs by other artists from time to time; he contributed to the group Wilmer X's record Hallå Världen, with the song "Jag är bara lycklig när jag dricker" (translates to "I'm only happy when I'm drinking").

He was found dead in his home in Alingsås on 4 May 2016.

== Discography ==
=== Albums ===
Solo albums

Year	Album	Peak positions	Certification
Year	Album	SWE	Certification
1993	Olle Ljungström	40	
1994	Världens räddaste man	10	
1995	Tack	8	
1998	Det stora kalaset	10	
2000	En apa som liknar dig	12	
2002	Syntheziser	20	
2009	Sju	5	
2013	Släng in en clown	5	
2017	Måla hela världen	14	

Compilation albums

Year	Album	Peak positions	Certification
Year	Album	SWE	Certification
2001	Bäst	10	
2010	Original Album Series	42	
2013	Så mycket Olle Ljungström	2	

with Reeperbahn

- 1979: Reeperbahn
- 1980: No / Time / Outside Wall / Flowers (EP / maxi-single)
- 1981: Venuspassagen
- 1982: Samlade singlar (compilation album)
- 1983: Peep-Show
- 1983: Intriger
- 1993: 79-83 (compilation album)

with Stry Terrarie

- 2006: R U Sockudåpad?

=== EPs ===
- 1997: "Nåt för dom som väntar"

== Bibliography ==
- Jag är både listig och stark (Norstedts, 2011)
