= Varning på stan =

Single by Magnus Uggla

from the album Va ska man ta livet av sig för när man ändå inte får höra snacket efteråt
- A-side: "Varning på stan"
- Released: 1977
- Genre: punk, rock
- Songwriter: Magnus Uggla

Magnus Uggla singles chronology
"Sommartid" (1977)	"Varning på stan" (1977)	"Jag skiter" (1977)

Varning på stan is a song written and recorded by Magnus Uggla for the album Va ska man ta livet av sig för när man ändå inte får höra snacket efteråt in 1977. He also recorded the song with lyrics in English by Colin Griffin, as "Hit the Girls on the Run". The single peaked at number two on the Swedish singles chart. When played on radio, Sveriges Radio were reported to Radionämnden when some listeners considered the song lyrics being too vulgar and sexist. The English language-version was used in the 1978 film En vandring i solen, and the Swedish language original version was used in the 1997 film Adam & Eva.

In 1990, Asta Kask covered the song on the live album Sista dansen. Other covers have been made by Attack and Pugh Rogefeldt, the latter in the third season of Så mycket bättre.

Magnus Uggla has later reused lyrical references to the song in others of his songs, like "Stockholms heta nätter" from Där jag är e're alltid bäst in the year 2000 and "Varning på stan enligt Bellman" from Den tatuerade generationen (2004). Magnus Uggla stated that the song was an honest description of the lives of many young guys, but many parents became upset and during evenings, the topic was taken to TV debates.

== Charts ==
Chart (1977–1978)	Peak position
Sweden (Sverigetopplistan)	1
