= 1:a gången =

1993 song by Magnus Uggla and Anders Henriksson

Song by Magnus Uggla

from the album Alla får påsar
- Language: Swedish
- Released: 1993
- Genre: poprock
- Composers: Magnus Uggla, Anders Henriksson
- Lyricist: Magnus Uggla

"1:a gången" is a song written by Magnus Uggla and Anders Henriksson, and originally recorded by Uggla on his 1993 album Alla får påsar. The song is written from a perspective where the singer talks to a young girl, telling her to not hurry growing up, because it will still happen. The lyrics are about Uggla's daughter Agnes when she longed to grow up.

Miss Li recorded the song for season 3 of the Swedish show Så mycket bättre and her version also appeared on the show's official compilation album. It subsequently appeared on her own studio album Wolves. Her version also peaked at number 19 on the Swedish singles chart.

In 2013, the song was recorded by the Drifters on the album Jukebox.

== Charts ==
=== Miss Li version ===
Chart (2014)	Peak position
Sweden (Sverigetopplistan)	19
