= Miss Li =

Swedish singer and songwriter (born 1982)

- Miss Li in 2026
- Born: Linda Therese Karlsson; 21 July 1982 (age 44); Borlänge, Sweden
- Spouse: Sonny Gustafsson (m. 2007)
- Musical career
- Genres: Pop; jazz fusion; cabaret; blues
- Occupations: Singer; songwriter; musician
- Instruments: Vocals; piano
- Works: See discography
- Years active: 2006–present
- Label: Pistol Packin' Music

Linda Therese Karlsson (born 21 July 1982), known professionally as Miss Li, is a Swedish singer-songwriter. Since beginning her career in the early-2000s, she has released a total of eight studio albums, and several of her songs have been featured in Swedish commercials as well as numerous American television series.

== Biography ==
Linda Karlsson was born on 21 July 1982 (Note: Karlsson notes in a 2018 Facebook post that 21 July is her date of birth. AllMusic lists her birth year as 1982.) in Borlänge, Sweden. In her adulthood, she relocated to Stockholm.

Using the stage name Miss Li, she released her debut album, Late Night Heartbroken Blues, in 2006. Her single "Don't Try to Fool Me" has been featured on the Showtime original series Weeds, as well as Grey's Anatomy, both in 2007.

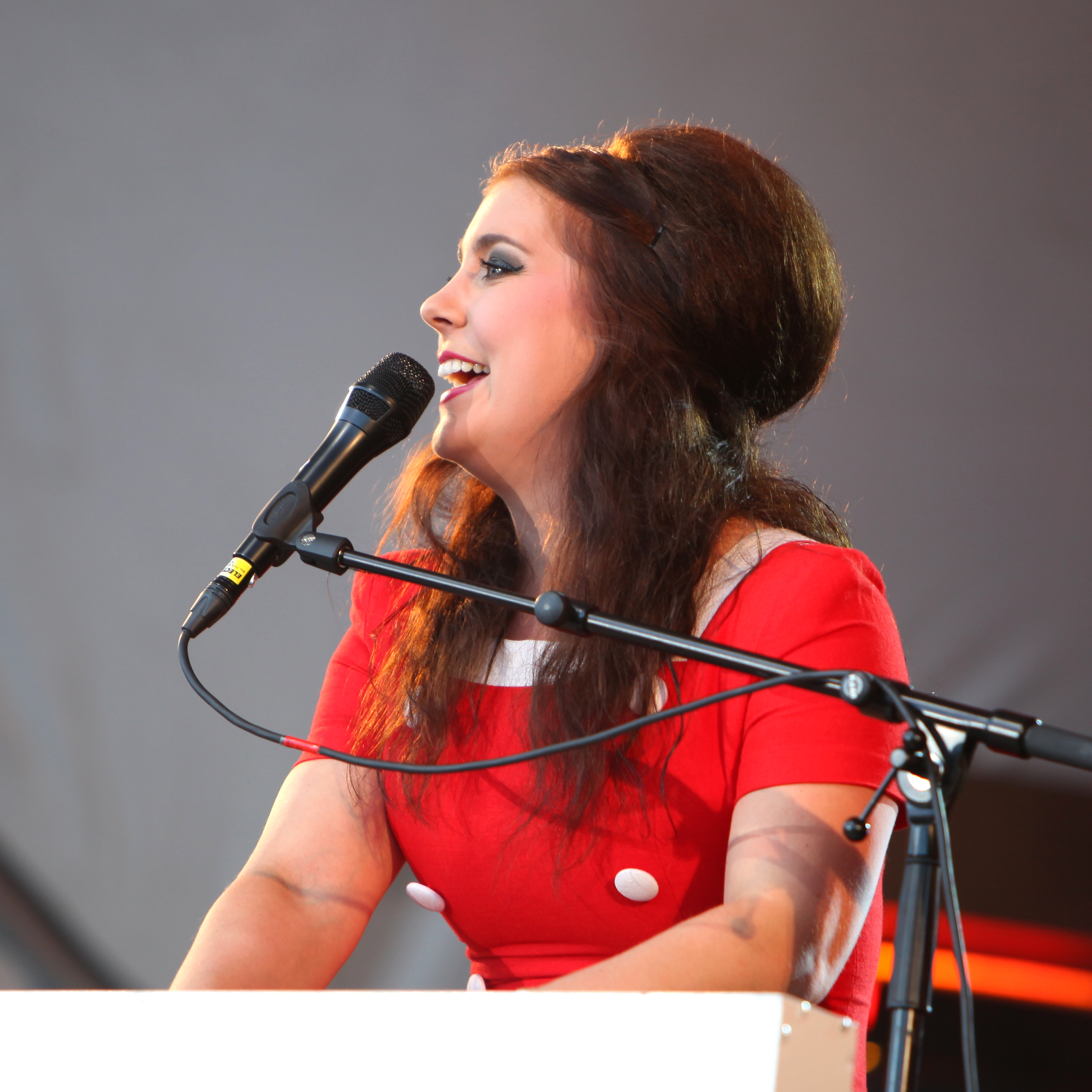
Miss Li performing at the 2009 Stockholm Pride Festival

Her song "Bourgeois Shangri-La" from her fourth studio album, Dancing the Whole Way Home (2009), was used by Apple in the iPod Nano 5G television commercial, and her song "Oh Boy" was used in a 2010 Volvo C70 commercial. Her track "True Love Stalker" was used in the television promo of an episode of Desperate Housewives. The track "Forever Drunk" was featured in the opening scene of Grey's Anatomy. Her song "My Heart Goes Boom" was featured on multiple adverts for the popular UK furniture store DFS in late 2012, shortly after her appearance on Så mycket bättre that same year. In 2013 "My Heart Goes Boom" was used in American television advertisements of women's clothes by White House Black Market. After an extensive tour promoting her seventh album, Wolves concluded in 2014, Miss Li stated she sank into a depression, and went into seclusion. She subsequently attended a songwriters' camp in Los Angeles, California, where she collaborated in the studio with Rihanna, writing a track for the artist's album Anti (2016). However, The unnamed track did not appear on the album, though Li stated that Rihanna had purchased the rights to it.

Miss Li released her eighth studio album, A Woman's Guide to Survival, in 2017. The song "Aqualung" from the album was featured in the debut video for the 2019 Volvo XC40. Her song, "I Can't Get You Off My Mind", is used for movie promos on the cable and satellite station Starz.

== Discography ==
=== Studio albums ===
Title	Details	Peak chart positions
Title	Details	SWE
Late Night Heartbroken Blues	Released: 22 November 2006; Label: National; Format: CD, LP, digital download	60
God Put a Rainbow in the Sky	Released: 2 May 2007; Label: National; Format: CD, LP, digital download	29
Songs of a Rag Doll	Released: 17 October 2007; Label: National; Format: CD, LP, digital download	23
Dancing the Whole Way Home	Released: 31 March 2009; Label: National; Format: CD, LP, digital download	8
Beats & Bruises	Released: 16 March 2011; Label: National; Format: CD, LP, digital download	13
Tangerine Dream	Released: 10 October 2012; Label: National; Format: CD, LP, digital download	11
Wolves	Released: 10 April 2013; Label: National; Format: CD, LP, digital download	2
A Woman's Guide to Survival	Released: 24 November 2017; Label: Sony Music; Format: CD, LP, digital download	27
Underbart i all misär	Released: 24 September 2021; Label: Pistol Packin' Music; Format: CD, LP, digital download	1
Wonderful Misery	Released: 12 November 2021; Label: Pistol Packin' Music; Format: Digital download	—
Livet, döden, skiten däremellan	Released: 11 October 2024; Label: Pistol Packin' Music; Format: CD, LP, digital download	5

=== Compilation albums ===
Title	Details	Peak chart positions
Title	Details	SWE
Best of 061122‒071122	Released: 25 December 2007; Label: National; Format: CD, LP, digital download	11
Singles and Selected	Released: 7 November 2012; Label: National; Format: CD, LP, digital download	15

=== EPs ===
- Så mycket bättre 2012 – Tolkningar (2012)
- Så mycket bättre – Tolkningarna (2019)

=== Singles ===
==== As lead artist ====
List of singles as lead artist, with selected chart positions, showing year released and album name
Title	Year	Peak chart positions		Certifications	Album
Title	Year	SWE	GER	Certifications	Album
"Oh Boy" (Note: "Oh Boy" did not chart until July 2008.)	2006	8	—		Late Night Heartbroken Blues
"High on You"	2007	—	—		Late Night Heartbroken Blues
"I'm Sorry, He's Mine"	2007	46	—		God Put a Rainbow in the Sky
"Good Morning"	2007	—	—		Non-album single
"Om du lämnade mig nu" (with Lars Winnerbäck)	2007	1	—	GLF: 2× Platinum	Daugava
"Let Her Go"	2007	—	—		God Put a Rainbow in the Sky
"Gotta Leave My Troubles Behind"	2007	—	—		Songs of a Rag Doll
"Ba Ba Ba"	2008	42	—		Songs of a Rag Doll
"I Heard of a Girl"	2009	39	—		Dancing the Whole Way Home
"Dancing the Whole Way Home"	2009	—	—		Dancing the Whole Way Home
"Stupid Girl"	2009	—	—		Dancing the Whole Way Home
"Bourgeois Shangri-La" (featuring Amanda Jenssen)	2010	—	—		Dancing the Whole Way Home
"I Can't Get You Off My Mind"	2011	—	—		Beats & Bruises
"You Could Have It (So Much Better Without Me)"	2011	—	—		Beats & Bruises
"Hit It"	2011	—	—		Beats & Bruises
"My Heart Goes Boom"	2012	—	—		Tangerine Dream
"Plastic Faces" (Note: "Plastic Faces" did not chart until 2013 in Germany.)	2012	—	57		Tangerine Dream
"Här kommer natten"	2012	16	—	GLF: Gold	Så mycket bättre 2012 – Tolkningar
"Nåt för dom som väntar"	2012	40	—		Så mycket bättre 2012 – Tolkningar
"1:a gången"	2012	19	—	GLF: Gold	Så mycket bättre 2012 – Tolkningar
"Lovekiller"	2013	47	—		Så mycket bättre 2012 – Tolkningar
"I Finally Found It"	2014	—	—		Non-album single
"Bonfire"	2016	— (Note: "Bonfire" did not enter the Swedish Singles Chart, but peaked at number 19 on the Swedish Heatseeker chart.)	—		A Woman's Guide to Survival
"Aqualung"	2017	—	—		A Woman's Guide to Survival
"Love Hurts"	2017	—	—		A Woman's Guide to Survival
"The Day I Die (I Want You to Celebrate)"	2017	— (Note: "The Day I Die (I Want You to Celebrate)" did not enter the Swedish Singellista Chart, but peaked at number five on the Swedish Heatseekers Chart.)	—		A Woman's Guide to Survival
"Den vintertid nu kommer"	2018	23	—	GLF: Gold	Non-album singles
"Blommorna" (with Petter)	2019	— (Note: "Blommorna" did not enter the Swedish Singellista Chart, but peaked at number one on the Swedish Heatseeker Chart.)	—		Non-album singles
"Lev nu dö sen"	2019	1	—	GLF: 5× Platinum	Så mycket bättre
"Until It All Ends"	2019	69	—		Så mycket bättre
"Everything's Alright"	2019	61	—		Så mycket bättre
"Då börjar fåglar sjunga"	2019	19	—		Så mycket bättre
"Kaffe och en cigarett"	2019	46	—		Så mycket bättre
"Second Life Replay"	2019	— (Note: "Second Life Replay" did not enter the Swedish Singellista Chart, but peaked at number 11 on the Swedish Heatseeker Chart.)	—		Så mycket bättre
"Komplicerad" (Note: An English version was released titled "Complicated".)	2020	2	—	GLF: 3× Platinum; IFPI Norge: Platinum	Underbart i all misär (Note: An English version of the album was released titled "Wonderful Misery".)
"Starkare" (Note: An English version was released titled "Stronger".)	2020	26	—	GLF: Platinum	Underbart i all misär
"Terapi" (Note: An English version was released titled "Therapy".)	2020	39	—		Underbart i all misär
"Förlåt" (Note: An English version was released titled "Sorry".)	2021	27	—	GLF: Gold	Underbart i all misär
"Instruktionsboken" (Note: An English version was released titled "The Manual".)	2021	18	—	GLF: Platinum	Underbart i all misär
"Utan dig" (Note: An English version was released titled "Without You".)	2021	26	—		Underbart i all misär
"Tidsmaskin" (Note: An English version was released titled "Time Machine".)	2021	36	—		Underbart i all misär
"X"	2022	2	—	IFPI Norge: Gold	Livet, döden, skiten däremellan
"Hälsa Gud"	2022	4	—		Livet, döden, skiten däremellan
"Ålderdomshemmet"	2023	16	—		Livet, döden, skiten däremellan
"Våran sång" (Sveriges Officiella VM-låt 2023)	2023	4	—		Non-album single
"Misstag"	2024	12	—	GLF: Platinum	Livet, döden, skiten däremellan
"Maraton" (featuring Eah Jé)	2024	8	—	GLF: Platinum	Livet, döden, skiten däremellan
"Verktygslådan"	2024	24	—		Livet, döden, skiten däremellan
"Småstadsdrömmar"	2024	20	—		Livet, döden, skiten däremellan
"På måndag"	2024	27	—		Livet, döden, skiten däremellan
"Dansa med mig själv"	2026	38	—		Non-album singles
"Jack & Coke"	2026	58	—		Non-album singles
"—" denotes a single that did not chart or was not released.

==== As featured artist ====
Year	Single	Peak chart positions			Album
Year	Single	SWE	AUT	GER	Album
2019	"Close Your Eyes" (Felix Jaehn and Vize featuring Miss Li)	63	23	21	Breathe
