= Astrologen =

Song by Magnus Uggla

from the album Välkommen till folkhemmet
- Language: Swedish
- Released: 1983
- Genre: Pop
- Length: 5:11
- Label: Sonet Grammofon
- Songwriter: Magnus Uggla
- Producer: Magnus Uggla

"Astrologen" ("The Astrologer") is a song written by Magnus Uggla, appearing on his 1983 album Välkommen till folkhemmet. The characteristic string arrangement was, as usual, made by Anders Henriksson.

Uggla wrote the song while being together with a girl who was interested in astrological signs. He first wanted to sing it as a duet with Agnetha Fältskog, but she was working on a solo album, and Uggla said he was afraid of asking.

The song was recorded by Date for their 2010 album Här och nu!.

Darin Zanyar performed the song in the 2012 edition of Så mycket bättre (season 3). His version peaked at number two on the Swedish Singles Chart.

== Charts ==
=== Darin Zanyar version ===
Weekly charts

Chart (2012–2013)	Peak position
Sweden (Sverigetopplistan)	2

=== Darin Zanyar version ===
Year-end charts

Chart (2012)	Position
Sweden (Sverigetopplistan)	95
Chart (2013)	Position
Sweden (Sverigetopplistan)	76
