= 4 sekunder =

Single by Magnus Uggla

from the album Alla får påsar
- Released: 1993
- Genre: Pop rock
- Length: 4:04
- Songwriters: Anders Henriksson; Magnus Uggla

Magnus Uggla singles chronology
"Stig in och ta en cocktail" (1990)	"4 sekunder" (1993)	"Jånni Balle" (1993)

Music video
- "4 sekunder" on YouTube

"4 sekunder" is a song written by Swedish musician Magnus Uggla and Anders Henriksson and recorded by Uggla on his tenth album, Alla får påsar (1993). The single peaked at number seven on the Swedish singles chart. Charting at Trackslistan for nine weeks between 2–16 October 1993, it peaked at number three. The song also charted at Svensktoppen for nine weeks between 23 October-18 December 1993, peaking at number five.

== Charts ==
Chart (1993)	Peak position
Europe (Eurochart Hot 100)	85
Sweden (Sverigetopplistan)	7
Sweden (Trackslistan)	3
Sweden (Svensktoppen)	5
