= Johnny the Rucker =

Single by Magnus Uggla Band

from the album Magnus Uggla Band sjunger schlagers
- Released: 1979
- Recorded: 1979
- Genre: Rock, punk rock
- Length: 4:50
- Label: CBS
- Songwriters: Magnus Uggla; Johan Langer

"Johnny the Rucker", also spelled Johnny the Rocker, is a song written by Swedish pop and rock artist Magnus Uggla and performed by him at the Swedish Melodifestivalen 1979. It was produced by Anders Henriksson and Uggla. The string arrangement by Anders Henriksson was partly inspired by the Impromptu in A-flat major by Franz Schubert.

The song finished tenth and last, with 22 points. The song is on the track listing for the EP Magnus Uggla Band sjunger schlagers.

On the Swedish Singles Chart, it peaked at number four.

== Charts ==
| Chart (1979) | Peak position |
|---|---|
| Sweden | 4 |
