= Mälarö kyrka =

Single by Lenne Broberg
- A-side: "Mälarö kyrka"
- B-side: "Båten blå"
- Released: 1968
- Recorded: 1968
- Genre: Schlager
- Length: 3:01
- Label: RCA Victor
- Songwriter: Sven Lindahl

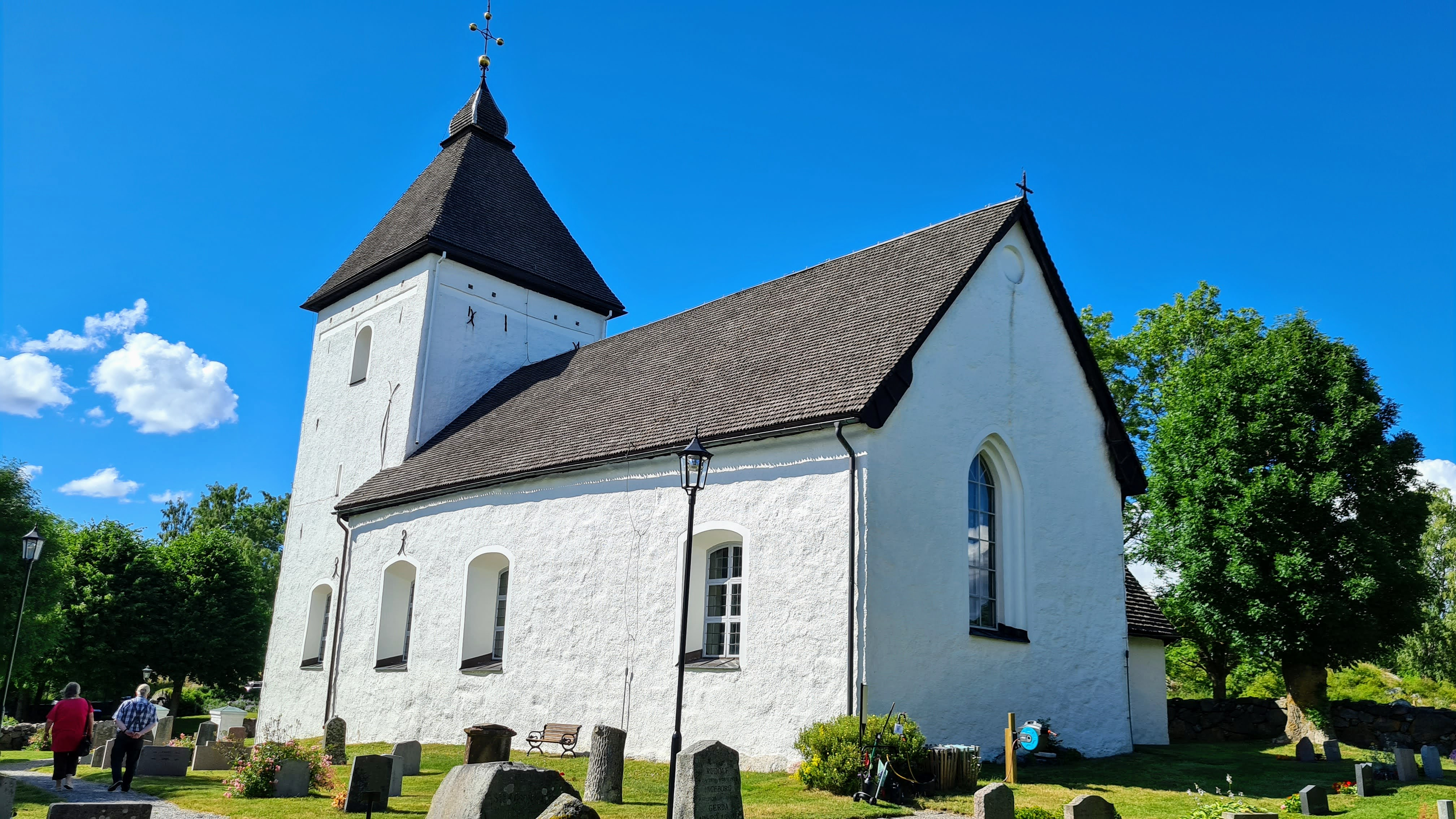
The song lyrics have been inspired by Adelsö Church.

"Mälarö kyrka" is a 1968 song in Swedish, written by Swedish TV man Sven Lindahl. The song text is about a young man sneaking into a church late at night to play Bach and the Beatles on the organ. The inspiration to the song text is from the church Adelsö kyrka, and the song was originally recorded by Lenne Broberg and released as a single. The song stayed at Svensktoppen for seven weeks during the period 24 March-5 May 1968. On 7 April 1968, his version of the song entered the #1 on Svensktoppen.

It has a similar chord progression to Pachelbel's Canon.

== Cover versions ==
In 1979, Magnus Uggla covered the song on his EP Magnus Uggla band sjunger schlagers. Åsa Jinder recorded Mälarö kyrka with her nyckelharpa, scoring a Svensktoppen hit for seven weeks during the period 27 November 1993 – 29 January 1994. A Finnish language version, Vanha Holvikirkko, has also been written and been recorded by among others Finnish musician Eero Raittinen and punk band Klamydia. The song was also covered in 2010 by the dansband Rolandz on their album Jajamen.
