= Magnus Uggla =

Swedish artist, composer, actor, and radio host

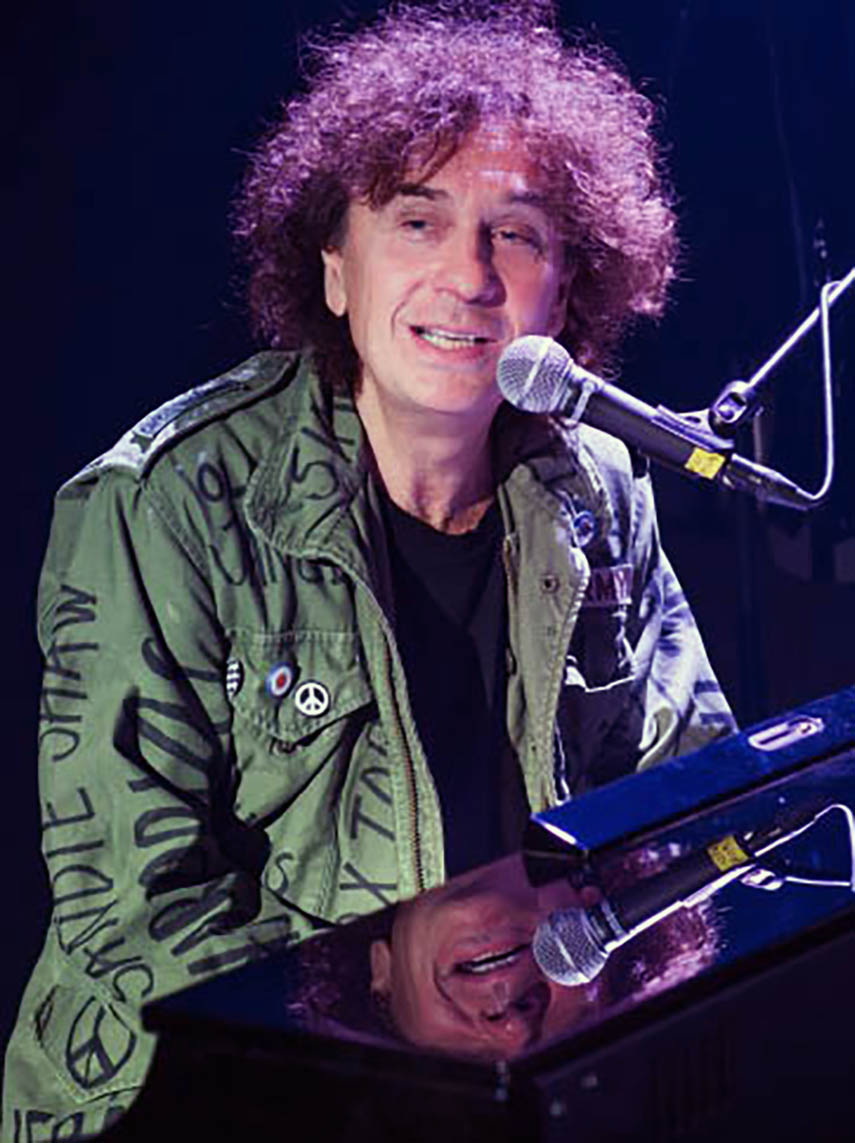
- Magnus Uggla in 2015.

Background information
- Born: Per Allan Magnus Claësson Uggla; 18 June 1954 (age 72); Stockholm, Sweden
- Genres: Glam rock; pop rock; pop
- Occupation: Singer-songwriter
- Instrument: Vocals
- Years active: 1975–present
- Website: Official website

Per Allan Magnus Claësson Uggla (pronounced [pæːr ˈǎlːan ˈmǎŋːnɵs ˈklɑ̌ːsɔn ˈɵ̂ɡːla]; born 18 June 1954) is a Swedish entertainer, composer, actor, and occasional radio host. He is known for his satirical lyrics.

Uggla was born in Stockholm. He was the lead singer of the hard rock band JUSO (later renamed Alexander Lucas) before going solo in the early 1970s. Their influences were Black Sabbath, The Groundhogs and Alice Cooper, among others. Uggla's first two glam- and art rock-inspired albums Om Bobbo Viking and Livets teaterˈ did not sell well, the first only about 500 copies in Sweden and Livets teater even less. But his departure from glam rock with the punk and hard rock inspired Va ska man ta livet av sig för när man ändå inte får höra snacket efteråt gained him much popularity and the album sold about 150,000 copies. In the 1970s, several music magazines gave Magnus the name "The Swedish Ian Hunter". In 1979, he was one of the members in Magnus Uggla Band. Povel Ramel awarded him the Karamelodiktstipendiet in 1991.

Uggla's solo influences includes Karl Gerhard, David Bowie, The Clash, Marc Bolan, Wendy Carlos and Mott the Hoople. In an interview with Aftonbladet, Uggla said that the Clash "was a really good band" and also created the song "Du ska va' glad" after he saw them perform at Gröna Lund.

== Personal life ==
Uggla married Louise Uggla in 1990, with whom he has one son and one daughter. He also has a daughter from an earlier relationship.

Uggla is diagnosed with attention deficit hyperactivity disorder (ADHD). He decided to do a psychiatric assessment for ADHD as an adult after one of his children had been diagnosed.

== In popular culture ==
- Uggla participated in the fourth semi-final of Melodifestivalen 2007 with the song "För kung och fosterland", competing for the opportunity to represent Sweden in the Eurovision Song Contest in Helsinki, Finland. On February 24, 2007, Uggla performed his song, and advanced to the Second Chance round the following Saturday, where he lost to Sonja Aldén in the last round of voting. Earlier that week, he had received complaints about the lyrics of the song which contain a line that could be interpreted as degrading to Polish people, but the Swedish Chancellor of Justice decided not to try this as a violation of the hate speech act.
- Plastic Bertrand has recorded a French version of Uggla's song "Vittring". It's called "Rock'n'Roll je te hais" and is found on Bertrand's LP L'Album.

== Discography ==
Studio albums

- 1975: Om Bobbo Viking
- 1976: Livets teater
- 1977: Va ska man ta livet av sig för när man ändå inte får höra snacket efteråt
- 1978: Vittring
- 1980: Den ljusnande framtid är vår
- 1983: Välkommen till folkhemmet
- 1986: Den döende dandyn
- 1987: Allting som ni gör kan jag göra bättre
- 1989: 35-åringen
- 1993: Alla får påsar
- 1997: Karaoke
- 2000: Där jag är e're alltid bäst
- 2004: Den tatuerade generationen
- 2006: Ett bedårande barn av sin tid (Karl Gerhard covers)
- 2007: Pärlor åt svinen
- 2010: Karl Gerhard passerar i revy
- 2011: Innan filmen tagit slut
- 2025: Innan kronan blir för tung

Collections

- 1985: Retrospektivt collage
- 1986: Collection (only released in Finland)
- 1994: 100% Uggla
- 2002: Klassiska mästerverk
- 2008: Magnus Uggla 1975-2008

Live albums

- 1981: Godkänd pirat – Live
- 2013: Magnus den store – Live

Maxi EP

- 1979: Magnus Uggla band sjunger schlagers

=== International singles ===
Singles released in France, Spain, United Kingdom and Germany.

- 1979: Everything You Do/Concrete Kid
- 1981: Ain't About To Go Back/Scandal Beauties
- 1981: Body Love/The Other Side (also released in Sweden)

=== International covers ===
Magnus Uggla has recorded several covers. These are the international ones, for which Uggla wrote new Swedish lyrics:

- The Rolling Stones' "Star Star" became Uggla's "Stjärn…r" (or actually "Stjärnluder")
- The Crystals' "Then He Kissed Me" became Uggla's "Å, han kysste mej"
- Nick Gilder's "Metro Jets" became Uggla's "Centrumhets"
- Bruce Woolley's "Blue Blue (Victoria)" became Uggla's "IQ"
- Nick Gilder's "Worlds Collide" became Uggla's "Herr servitör"

Recorded with original lyrics:

- David Bowie's "Rebel Rebel"
- Steppenwolf's "Born to Be Wild"
- Ramones' "Sheena Is a Punk Rocker"

=== Swedish covers ===
Uggla has covered the following Swedish songs by other artists on officially released studio records (the artists mentioned are those who first recorded the songs, not the songwriters/composers):

- "Jazzgossen" by Karl Gerhard
- "Leva livet" by Lill-Babs (originally "It's My Party" by Lesley Gore)
- "Ring ring" (Swedish version) by ABBA
- "Mälarö kyrka" by Sven Lindahl
- "Livet är en fest" by Nationalteatern
- "Påtalåten" by Ola Magnell
- "Vem kan man lita på?" by Hoola Bandoola Band
- "Häng med på party" by Ulf Neidemar
- "I natt är jag din" by Tomas Ledin
- "Hög standard" by Peps Persson
- "Vi måste höja våra röster" by Margareta Garpe, Suzanne Osten and Gunnar Edander (since nobody seems to know exactly who recorded it first, these are the composers and songwriters)
- "Tusen systrar" by Jösses Flickor
- "In kommer Gösta" by Philemon Arthur & the Dung
- "Speedy Gonzales" by Nationalteatern
- "Hog farm" by Pugh Rogefeldt
- "Ska vi gå hem till dig" by Lasse Tennander

Others

- "Jag och min far" (from EP Så mycket bättre (Säsong 3 – Olles dag – Program 2))
- "Har hört om en tjej (I Heard of a Girl)" (from EP Säsong 3 – Miss Lis dag – Program 3)

== Bibliography ==
- Jag hade en gång en blogg (2008) with Jonathex Dan
- Enda sättet att genomlida en konsert är att själv stå på scenen (2019)

== See also ==
- List of Swedes in music
