= Laleh Pourkarim discography =

Laleh's discography which consists nine albums and three Ep's

Laleh discography
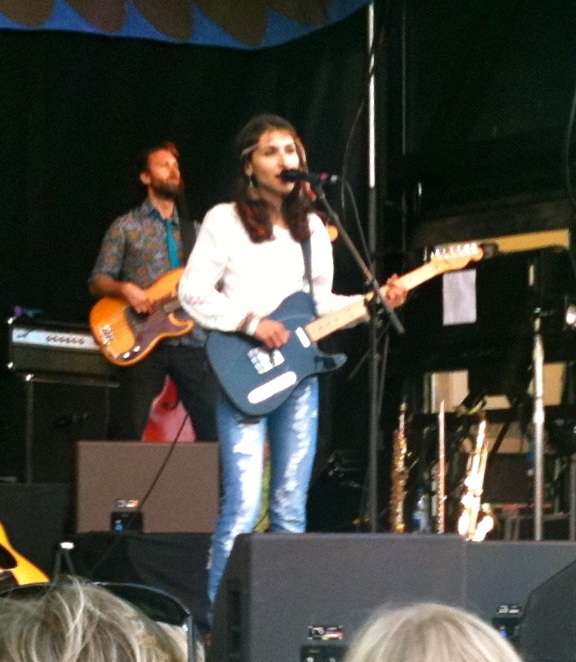
- Laleh performing at Landskrona in 2010
- Studio albums: 10
- Extended plays: 2
- Singles: 25
- Music videos: 16

The discography of Laleh, an Iranian-born Swedish singer-songwriter contains ten studio albums and three extended plays.

Laleh first appeared on Swedish charts in early 2005 with the single "Invisible (My Song)" which instantly reached the top ten in the country's chart. Until 2011, this was her only release to chart within the top ten, despite her most successful single to date in terms of sales being "Live Tomorrow", also released in 2005. This song also managed to chart at number eleven in Denmark, her only song to chart outside of Sweden. Her self-titled debut album was released in March 2005 and found extended chart success, peaking at number one and enjoying a resurgence in sales following the release of "Live Tomorrow".

Her follow-up album, Prinsessor, was released a year later and peaked at number three in the charts. The album saw the release of a further four songs, all of which failed to chart on the Sverigetopplistan. After taking a three-year break, Laleh returned with her third effort, Me and Simon, which peaked at number two in the Swedish album chart and yielded three charting singles, "Snö", "Simon Says" and "Big City Love". In 2011, Laleh took part in Swedish reality show Så mycket bättre, which saw four covers she performed chart on the Sverigetopplistan. In 2012 she released her fourth studio album, Sjung, which was preceded by the single "Some Die Young" and included "Vårens första dag".

== Albums ==
=== Studio albums ===
Title	Details	Peak chart positions		Certifications
Title	Details	SWE	NOR	Certifications
Laleh	Released: 30 March 2005; Label: Lost Army, Warner Music Sweden; Formats: CD, digital download, vinyl	1	—	
Prinsessor	Released: 6 December 2006; Label: Lost Army, Warner Music Sweden; Formats: CD, digital download	3	—	
Me and Simon	Released: 19 January 2009; Label: Lost Army, Warner Music Sweden; Formats: CD, digital download	2	—	
Sjung	Released: 25 January 2012; Label: Lost Army, Warner Music Sweden; Formats: CD, digital download, vinyl	1	1	NOR: Gold; SWE: Platinum
Colors	Released: 14 October 2013; Label: Lost Army, Warner Music Sweden; Formats: CD, digital download, vinyl	2	4	SWE: Gold
Kristaller	Released: 16 September 2016; Label: Lost Army, Warner Music Sweden; Formats: CD, digital download, vinyl	2	18	SWE: Gold
Vänta!	Released: 31 May 2019; Label: Lost Army, Warner Music Sweden; Formats: CD, digital download, vinyl	4	—	
Postcards	Released: 20 December 2019; Label: Lost Army, Warner Music Sweden; Formats: Digital download, streaming	33	—	
Vatten	Released: 25 March 2022; Label: Palang, Universal Music Sweden; Formats: CD, digital download, streaming, vinyl	1	—	
Jag är	Released: 27 June 2025; Label: Universal; Formats: Digital download, streaming	8	—	
"—" denotes releases that did not chart or not released to that country

=== Live albums ===
Title	Details
Laleh (Live från Ullevi)	Released: 3 February 2023; Label: Palang, Universal Music Sweden; Format: LP

=== Video albums ===
Title	Details	Peak chart positions
Title	Details	SWE DVD Album
Jag är inte beredd att dö än	Released: December 2014; Formats: DVD	2

== Extended plays ==
Title	EP details
Tolkningarna	Released: 25 December 2011; Label: Lost Army / Warner Music Sweden; Formats: Digital download
Boom	Released: 30 September 2014; Label: Island; Formats: Digital download
Vatten	Released: 31 July 2020; Label: Palang, Universal Music Sweden; Formats: Digital download

== Singles ==
=== As lead artist ===
List of singles, with selected chart positions, showing year released and album name
Year	Title	Peak chart positions						Certifications	Album
Year	Title	SWE	AUT	DEN	FIN	GER	NOR	Certifications	Album
2005	"Invisible (My Song)"	7	—	—	—	—	—		Laleh
2005	"Storebror"	—	—	—	—	—	—		Laleh
2005	"Live Tomorrow"	20	—	11	—	—	—		Laleh
2006	"Forgive but Not Forget"	46	—	—	—	—	—		Laleh
2006	"Det är vi som bestämmer (Vem har lurat alla barnen)"	—	—	—	—	—	—		Prinsessor
2006	"November"	—	—	—	—	—	—		Prinsessor
2007	"Call on Me"	—	—	—	—	—	—		Prinsessor
2007	"Closer"	—	—	—	—	—	—		Prinsessor
2007	"Snö"	14	—	—	—	—	—		Me and Simon
2009	"Simon Says"	41	—	—	—	—	—		Me and Simon
2009	"Big City Love"	32	—	—	—	—	—		Me and Simon
2009	"Bjurö klubb"	—	—	—	—	—	—		Me and Simon
2010	"Mysteries"	—	—	—	—	—	—		Me and Simon
2012	"Some Die Young"	9	8	38	10	68	1	GLF: 2× Platinum; IFPI NOR: 14× Platinum	Sjung
2012	"Vårens första dag"	—	—	—	—	—	—		Sjung
2013	"Elephant"	—	—	—	—	—	—		Sjung
2013	"Colors"	33	—	34	—	—	—		Colors
2014	"Stars Align"	—	—	—	—	—	—		Colors
2014	"Goliat"	89	—	—	—	—	—		Colors
2014	"Tusen bitar"	—	—	—	—	—	—		Non-album single
2014	"Chiquitita"	—	—	—	—	—	—		Non-album single
2015	"Sol, vind och vatten"	50	—	—	—	—	—		Non-album single
2016	"Bara få va mig själv"	5	—	—	—	—	—	GLF: 4× Platinum	Kristaller
2016	"Aldrig bli som förr"	19	—	—	—	—	—	GLF: Platinum	Kristaller
2016	"Work"	90	—	—	—	—	—		Kristaller
2019	"Tack förlåt"	15	—	—	—	—	—		Vänta!
2019	"Knock Knock"	95	—	—	—	—	—		Vänta!
2019	"Sand överallt"	34	—	—	—	—	—		Vänta!
2019	"Svenska 2"	90	—	—	—	—	—		Vänta!
2020	"Det kommer bli bra"	14	—	—	—	—	—	GLF: 2× Platinum	Vatten
2020	"Vatten"	50	—	—	—	—	—		Vatten
2020	"Vinterland"	62	—	—	—	—	—		Non-album singles
2021	"Change"	— (Note: "Change" did not enter the Swedish Singellista Chart, but peaked at number three on the Swedish Heatseeker Chart.)	—	—	—	—	—		Non-album singles
2021	"Minnet av ett hav"	— (Note: "Minnet av ett hav" did not enter the Swedish Singellista Chart, but peaked at number 12 on the Swedish Heatseeker Chart.)	—	—	—	—	—		Vatten
2022	"Leopard"	— (Note: "Leopard" did not enter the Swedish Singellista Chart, but peaked at number five on the Swedish Heatseeker Chart.)	—	—	—	—	—		Vatten
2022	"Socker och vatten"	54	—	—	—	—	—		Vatten
2022	"Vi är på riktigt" (with Darin)	25	—	—	—	—	—		Non-album singles
2023	"Framåt"	— (Note: "Framåt" did not enter the Swedish Singellista Chart, but peaked at number one on the Swedish Heatseeker Chart.)	—	—	—	—	—		Non-album singles
2023	"Vargtimme"	— (Note: "Vargtimme" did not enter the Swedish Singellista Chart, but peaked at number 20 on the Swedish Heatseeker Chart.)	—	—	—	—	—		Non-album singles
2024	"Många ljus"	— (Note: "Många ljus" did not enter the Swedish Singellista Chart, but peaked at number two on the Swedish Heatseeker Chart.)	—	—	—	—	—		Non-album singles
2025	"Jag är"	— (Note: "Jag är" did not enter the Swedish Singellista Chart, but peaked at number 12 on the Swedish Heatseeker Chart.)	—	—	—	—	—		Jag är
"—" denotes singles that did not chart or were not released

=== As featured artist ===
List of singles, with selected chart positions, showing year released and album name
Year	Title	Peak chart positions		Album
Year	Title	SWE	US Pop Dig	Album
2016	"Welcome to the Show" (Note: "Welcome to the Show" is featured on Laleh's Kristaller album as a solo version) (Adam Lambert featuring Laleh)	— (Note: "Welcome to the Show" did not enter the Swedish Singles Chart, but peaked at number 17 on the Swedish Heatseeker chart.)	29	Non-album singles
2016	"Blue Sky" (Cazzette featuring Laleh)	—	—	Non-album singles
"—" denotes a recording that did not chart or was not released in that territory.

== Other charted songs ==
Year	Title	Peak chart positions	Album
Year	Title	SWE	Album
2011	"Just nu"	25	Tolkningarna
2011	"Ängeln i rummet"	6	Tolkningarna
2011	"Alla vill till himmelen men ingen vill dö"	25	Tolkningarna
2011	"Here I Go Again"	41	Tolkningarna
2013	"En stund på jorden"	— (Note: "En stund på jorden" did not enter the Swedish Singles Chart, but peaked at number 13 on the Swedish Heatseeker chart.)	Colors
2016	"Kristaller"	— (Note: "Kristaller" did not enter the Swedish Singles Chart, but peaked at number six on the Swedish Heatseeker chart.)	Kristaller
2016	"Behåll ditt huvud"	— (Note: "Behåll ditt huvud" did not enter the Swedish Singles Chart, but peaked at number 14 on the Swedish Heatseeker chart.)	Kristaller
2016	"Ge tillbaks det tu tagit"	— (Note: "Ge tillbaks det tu tagit" did not enter the Swedish Singles Chart, but peaked at number 16 on the Swedish Heatseeker chart.)	Kristaller
2019	"Vänta"	— (Note: "Vänta" did not enter the Swedish Singellista Chart, but peaked at number 18 on the Swedish Heatseeker Chart.)	Vänta!
2019	"City of Angels"	— (Note: "City of Angels" did not enter the Swedish Singellista Chart, but peaked at number 19 on the Swedish Heatseeker Chart.)	Vänta!
2020	"Winner"	— (Note: "Winner" did not enter the Swedish Singellista Chart, but peaked at number seven on the Swedish Heatseeker Chart.)	Postcards

== Production discography ==
Title	Year	Artist	Album	Songwriter	Producer
"Vinterland"	2014	Sarah Dawn Finer	Vinterland	check	
"Stone Cold"	2015	Demi Lovato	Confident	check	check
"Yes"	2015	Demi Lovato	Confident	check	check
"Father"	2015	Demi Lovato	Confident	check	check
"President"	2015	Demi Lovato	Unreleased	check	check
"Should've Been Us"	2015	Tori Kelly	Unbreakable Smile	check	
"City Dove"	2015	Tori Kelly	Unbreakable Smile	check	check
"Lost and Found"	2015	Ellie Goulding	Delirium	check	
"I Do What I Love"	2015	Ellie Goulding	Delirium	check	check
"Winner"	2015	Ellie Goulding	Delirium	check	
"Like This"	2016	Shawn Mendes	Illuminate	check	check
"Safe"	2018	Daya	Non-album single	check	
"Be Good To Me"	2018	Jacob Banks	Village	check	
"Intimate Moments"	2021	Isaac Dunbar	Evil Twin	check	

== Music videos ==
Title	Year	Director(s)
"Invisible (My Song)"	2005	Martin Fodor-Nilsson
"Storebror"	2005	Martin Fodor-Nilsson
"Live Tomorrow"	2005	Martin Fodor-Nilsson
"November"	2006	—N/a
"Call on Me"	2007	—N/a
"Closer"	2007	—N/a
"Simon Says"	2009	Martin Fodor-Nilsson
"Big City Love"	2009	Martin Fodor-Nilsson
"Some Die Young"	2012	—N/a
"Vårens första dag"	2012	Sacarias Kiusalaas
"Some Die Young" (version 2)	2013	Laleh Pourkarim
"Some Die Young" (version 3)	2013	Laleh Pourkarim
"Colors" (version 1)	2013	Laleh Pourkarim & Maceo Frost
"Speaking of Truth"	2014	—N/a
"Stars Align"	2014	Rickard L. Eriksson
"En stund på jorden"	2014	Laleh Pourkarim
"Elephant" (Lyric video)	2015	Fredrik Egerstrand & Kalle Gustafsson Jerneholm
"Colors" (version 2)	2015	B. Akerlund
"Speaking of Truth (Orchestrated)"	2015	—N/a
"Bara få va mig själv"	2016	Laleh Pourkarim
"Aldrig bli som förr"	2016	Laleh Pourkarim
"Change"	2021	Laleh Pourkarim
"Leopard"	2022	Laleh Pourkarim

== Other appearances ==
List of other appearances
Title	Year	Main Artist	Album
"Jag är en liten gosse"	2005	Pugh Rogefeldt	Opluggad Pugh 1
"Here With Me"	2014	Style of Eye	Footprints
