= Welcome to the Show =

Welcome to the Show may refer to:

- Welcome to the Show (TV series), a 2011 South Korean TV series
- Welcome to the Show (album), a 2004 album by Evil Masquerade
- "Welcome to the Show" (Adam Lambert song), 2016
- Welcome to the Show (Day6 song), 2024
- Welcome to the Show, a song by Alice Cooper from Road
- "Welcome to the Show", song from 2014 film My Little Pony: Equestria Girls – Rainbow Rocks
