= En blekt blondins ballader =

Compilation album by Eva Dahlgren
- Released: July 4, 2007
- Recorded: 1980–2005
- Genre: Swedish pop
- Length: 1 hour, 13 minutes
- Label: Sony BMG Music Entertainment

Eva Dahlgren chronology
Snö (2007)	En blekt blondins ballader (2007)	Petroleum och tång (2007)

En blekt blondins ballader is a compilation album by Eva Dahlgren which contains her ballad hit songs between 1980 and 2005, released on 4 July 2007.

== Track listing ==
Music and lyrics by Eva Dahlgren except: "När en vild röd ros slår ut doftar hela skogen", with music composed by Anders Hillborg.

1. Bara ibland
2. Guldlock
3. Blackheart
4. Vem tänder stjärnorna?
5. Guldgrävarsång
6. Du
7. Skönheten och befriaren
8. Mitt liv
9. Egoism
10. Ängeln i rummet
11. Lev så
12. Sand
13. Jorden är ett litet rum
14. Det som bär mig nu
15. Kanske för minnenas skull
16. När en vild röd ros slår ut doftar hela skogen

== Charts ==
Chart (2007–2009, 2011–2013)	Peak position
Finland (The Official Finnish Charts)	19
Sweden (Sverigetopplistan)	1
