= Sno =

Sno or SNO may refer to:

== People ==
- Evander Sno (born 1987), Dutch football coach and former player
- Shaquill Sno (born 1996), Dutch footballer

== Other uses ==
- "Snö", a song by Iranian-Swedish singer-songwriter Laleh
- Sakon Nakhon Airport, Thailand
- Senecionine N-oxygenase, an enzyme
- Serbian National Renewal, a defunct political party in Serbia
- Standard Bank Namibia
- Sudbury Neutrino Observatory
- Symphony Number One, an American chamber orchestra
- Tin(II) oxide (SnO)
