= Some Die Young =

Single by Laleh

from the album Sjung
- Released: 22 January 2012
- Genre: Pop
- Length: 3:48
- Label: Lost Army / Warner Music Sweden
- Songwriter: Laleh Pourkarim
- Producer: Laleh Pourkarim

Laleh singles chronology
"Mysteries" (2010)	"Some Die Young" (2012)	"Vårens första dag" (2012)

Laleh international singles chronology
"Some Die Young" (2013)

Music video
- "Some Die Young" on YouTube

"Some Die Young" is a song by Swedish singer-songwriter Laleh, taken as the lead single from her fourth studio album, Sjung. It was released in Scandinavia on 22 January 2012 through Warner Music Sweden, and in Germany on 30 August 2013 through Universal Music Germany. The pop song was written and produced by Laleh, and comes after her appearance on Swedish reality television show Så mycket bättre. Lyrically, the song discusses the loss of a loved one but also the need not to give up following this and holding out hope that things will eventually get better. Musically, the backdrop of the song contains swooping melodies and an upbeat tempo. The song has been credited as an unofficial soundtrack for those who lost people in the 2011 Norway attacks, with newspaper articles, university lectures and a number of fan videos to this effect emerging.

The song was simultaneously released with the on air on sale method, receiving no prior promotion. "Some Die Young" garnered positive reviews from music critics, with some describing it as a perfect segue from her success on Så mycket bättre. Commercially, "Some Die Young" made a large impact across Scandinavia. In Sweden it was certified double platinum, peaking at number 9 on the Sverigetopplistan and number 2 on the DigiListan. In Norway, the song peaked at number 1 and remained at the top of the chart for eight weeks. It is the twentieth best selling single of all time in Norway and has been certified 14× Platinum. "Some Die Young" also charted in Denmark and Finland. The single was also a considerable success on radio, topping the Norwegian airplay chart for a number of weeks and entering the top ten in Sweden. Laleh performed the song for the first time at the 2012 P3 Guld Awards in Gothenburg.

It was her first single which was released internationally outside of Scandinavia. After signing with Universal Music Germany, "Some Die Young" was released in Germany on 30 August 2013. A new music video was created for the German release specifically.

== Critical reception ==
The song garnered positive critical response, with Anders Nunstedt, music editor from the Swedish tabloid Expressen, describing the song's "Abba-drama that blooms in the chorus" as "great". Dan Backman from Svenska Dagbladet described "Some Die Young" as "effective", whilst the music website Scandipop described the single as "a rousing, building, mid-tempo track. An endearing vocal melody combined with a strong melody within the music [and] a gorgeous chorus in particular. Needless to say, if you were a fan of her old material then you’ll enjoy this". Peter Carlsson in Nerikes Allehanda noted that the song was "[refrained] like "Elephant" and "What You Want", but it is perhaps, above all, the high-quality smoothness that will impress in the long run".

== Music video ==
The initial music video for the song premiered on the Aftonbladet website and Lost Army's official YouTube channel on 26 January 2012. It features Laleh singing to camera and being shot wrapped around different fabrics. The video has been described by Scandipop as "something of an explosion of fabric and colour – and so looks more like a commercial for laundry detergent. But a stylish commercial for laundry detergent at that. And one with a great soundtrack".

A second music video was created for the German release of "Some Die Young".

== Commercial performance ==
"Some Die Young" was a commercial success. Following the digital release of the single, "Some Die Young" charted at number twenty-five on the Swedish Singles Chart. Meanwhile, its debut week on the Swedish DigiListan, which is based on legal online download sales data, saw the song peak at number two After steady progress each week thereafter, rising 25, 15, 10, 10, on the main singles chart, the song reached a peak of number nine in Sweden in its fifth week, becoming only her third song to place within the Swedish top ten after debut single "Invisible (My Song)" and the non-single release interpretation of Eva Dahlgren's "Ängeln i rummet". Following this peak, the single dropped a little but remained remarkably steady, settling for nine consecutive weeks between number twelve and number seventeen.

Furthermore, it became Laleh's first song to chart in Norway. Entering the chart at number seven in February 2012, the single rose 7-3 before dropping the next week to number five. After this the song picked up traction, spending four weeks at number two before peaking at number one for eight weeks. Its success saw it track at number one on the Norwegian Airplay Chart for more than five weeks, in addition to peaking at three on Swedish stations.

Despite being released at the same time across Scandinavia, "Some Die Young" had its first chart placing in Denmark in May 2012, debuting at number thirty-eight. This became Laleh's second single to chart in the region, following "Live Tomorrow's placing at number eleven in 2005.

== Live performances ==
The song was performed by Laleh for the first time at the P3 Guld Awards, a major Swedish annual awards show presented by youth orientated station Sveriges Radio P3, on 21 January in the Lisebergshallen, Gothenburg. The event was shown on SVT1 and the single was released the day after the show aired. Laleh also performed the single and participated in an interview with Fredrik Skavlan on Skavlan, a Norwegian-Swedish talk show which is shown on both NRK and SVT, and repeated on BBC Entertainment.

== Track listing ==
- Digital download
1. "Some Die Young" – 3:48

== Personnel ==
- Laleh Pourkarim – vocals
- Henrik Edenhed – mixing
- Björn Engelmann – mastering

== Charts and certifications ==
=== Weekly charts ===
Chart (2012)	Peak position
Denmark (Tracklisten)	38
Germany (GfK)	68
Finland (Suomen virallinen lista)	10
Norway (VG-lista)	1
Sweden (Sverigetopplistan)	9
Chart (2014)	Peak position
Austria (Ö3 Austria Top 40)	8

=== Year-end charts ===
Chart (2012)	Position
Sweden (Sverigetopplistan)	21
Chart (2014)	Position
Austria (Ö3 Austria Top 40)	70

=== Certifications ===
Region	Certification	Certified units/sales
Norway (IFPI Norway)	14× Platinum	140,000^{*}
Sweden (GLF)	2× Platinum	80,000^{‡}
^{*} Sales figures based on certification alone.^{‡} Sales+streaming figures based on certification alone.

== Radio date and release history ==
Region	Date	Format	Label
Sweden	22 January 2012	Mainstream radio airplay	Warner Music Sweden
Denmark	22 January 2012	Digital download	Warner Music Sweden
Finland	22 January 2012	Digital download	Warner Music Sweden
Norway	22 January 2012	Digital download	Warner Music Norway
Sweden	22 January 2012	Digital download	Warner Music Sweden
Germany	30 August 2013	Digital download	Universal Music Germany

== See also ==
- List of number-one songs in Norway
