= Me and Simon =

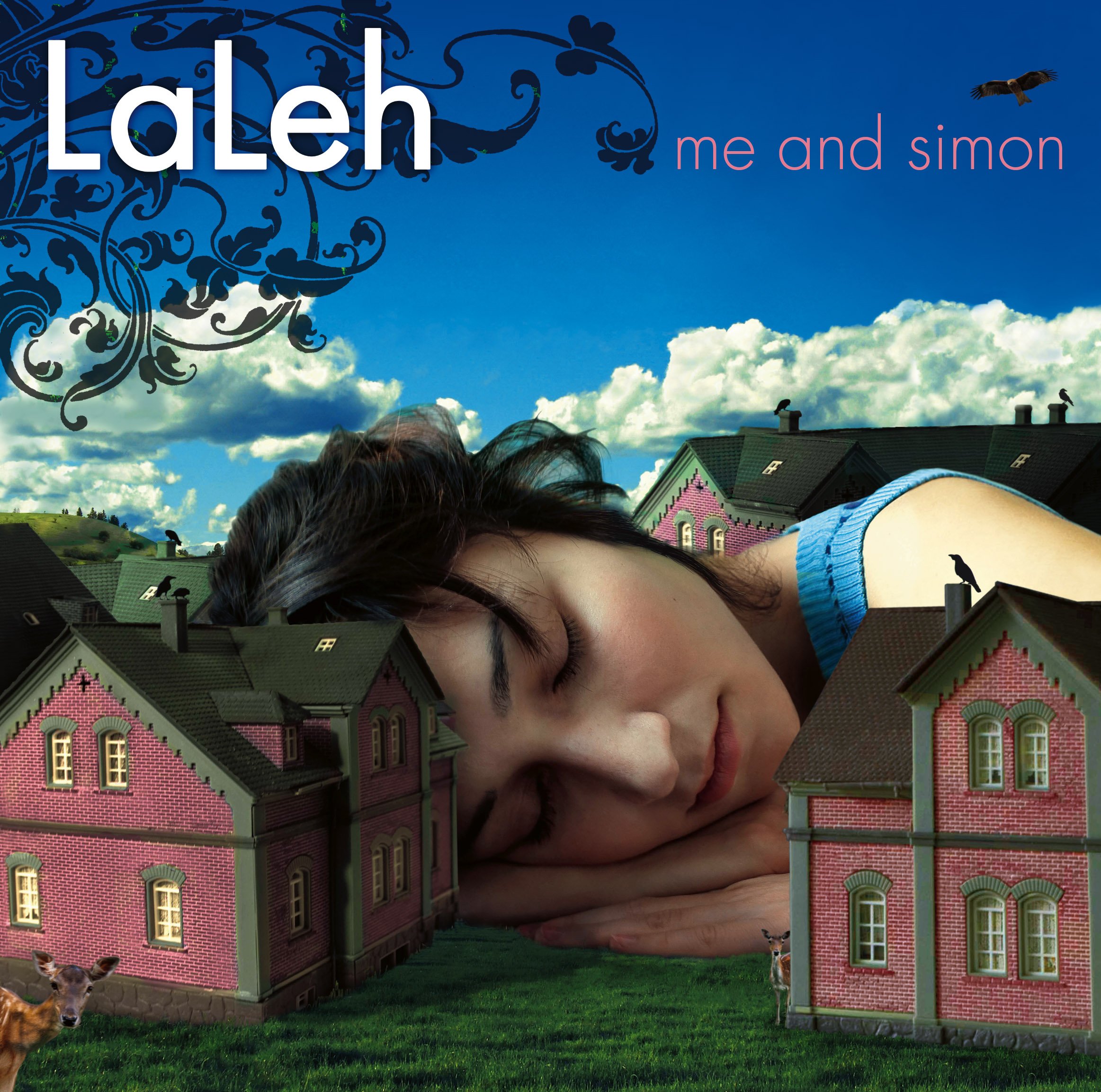

Studio album by Laleh
- Released: 19 January 2009 (Digital download); 21 January 2009 (CD)
- Recorded: 2007–2008
- Genre: Pop rock
- Length: 50:46
- Label: Warner Music Sweden
- Producer: Laleh Pourkarim

Laleh chronology
Prinsessor (2006)	Me and Simon (2009)	Sjung (2012)

Singles from Me and Simon
- 1. "Snö" Released: 19 December 2007; 2. "Simon Says" Released: 12 January 2009; 3. "Big City Love" Released: 11 May 2009; 4. "Bjurö klubb" Released: 14 September 2009; 5. "Mysteries" Released: 12 April 2010

Professional ratings
Review scores
Source	Rating
Aftonbladet	3/5 stars
Arbetarbladet	3/5 stars
Dalarnas Tidningar	3/5 stars
Metro	3/5 stars
Norra Västerbotten	4/5 stars
Nya Wermlands-Tidningen	3/5 stars
Svenska Dagbladet	4/6 stars
Sydsvenskan	3/5 stars
Uppsala Nya Tidning	3/5 stars

Me and Simon is the third studio album by Swedish singer-songwriter Laleh, released on 21 January 2009 on Warner Music Sweden records. The album peaked at number two on the Swedish Albums Chart.

First single from the album is the track "Simon Says", followed by "Big City Love" and "Bjurö klubb". The album also contains the track "Snö", soundtrack from the Swedish movie Arn - The Knight Templar which was recorded by Laleh together with the London Symphony Orchestra. As with her debut album, Laleh keeps her traditional language-mix in her music with having songs in both Swedish and English as well as Persian featured on the album. As well as her two previous albums, she has written and produced all of the songs from the album.

== Singles ==
- "Simon Says" was released as the lead single from the album on 12 January 2009. The song peaked at number forty-one on the Swedish Singles Chart.
- "Big City Love" was released as the second single from the album on 11 May 2009. The song peaked at number thirty-two on the Swedish Singles Chart.
- "Bjurö klubb" was released as the third single from the album on 10 September 2009.

== Track listing ==
All lyrics written by Laleh.

No.	Title	Length
1.	"Big City Love"	3:40
2.	"Simon Says"	3:53
3.	"Mysteries"	3:25
4.	"Go Go"	3:55
5.	"Roses"	4:54
6.	"The End"	5:06
7.	"Nation"	4:04
8.	"History"	1:00
9.	"Farda" (Tomorrow)	4:15
10.	"Snö" (Snow)	4:19
11.	"Bjurö klubb" (Bjurö club)	4:54
12.	"Svalorna" (The Swallows)	4:30
13.	"Lär mig om" (Teach Me About)	2:52
Total length:		50:46

== Charts ==
Chart (2009)	Peak position
Swedish Albums Chart	2
