= Vårens första dag =

2012 single by Laleh Pourkarim

Single by Laleh

from the album Sjung
- Released: 30 April 2012
- Genre: Indie pop
- Length: 4:41
- Label: Lost Army / Warner Music Sweden
- Songwriter: Laleh Pourkarim
- Producers: Laleh Pourkarim, Gustaf Thörn

Laleh singles chronology
"Some Die Young" (2012)	"Vårens första dag" (2012)	"Elephant" (2013)

Music video
- "Vårens Första Dag" on YouTube

"Vårens första dag" (Swedish for "First Day of the Spring") is a song by Swedish singer-songwriter Laleh, taken as the second single from her fourth studio album, Sjung. It was released on 30 April 2012. The indie pop song was written and produced by Laleh, in collaboration with Gustaf Thörn, with whom she had a few production sessions for the album. The single was sent out to radio in mid-March following the success "Some Die Young" had on both Swedish and Norwegian airplay and sales charts, being a number-one hit in Norway for weeks. The single peaked at number nineteen on the Swedish DigiListan.

== Critical reception ==
"‘Vårens första dag’ has the same tempo and style that made her cover of ‘Ängeln i rummet’ so popular. And its chorus does that trick of shifting in melody that ‘Some Die Young’ did so appealingly. It's very much the Laleh that Swedish listeners have gotten to know over the last six months. And indeed, love."

—Scandipop's review of the song.

In a review for the accompanying album, Anders Jaderup of Sydsvenskan mentioned that the song was a "real trump card", praising "Vårens första dag" for its "exuberant energy". "[It's] a great pop song, a life-affirming soundtrack for the next few months while waiting for a brighter season. It is also the song that will force everyone who started to associate Laleh with TV4-covers, to think again". Later in the review he picked out the song as the best track on the album. Marcus Grahn wrote for Värmlands Folkblad that the song "is a wonderful, colorful, explosive, flowering... encouraging [and] provoking prayer for life". The music blog Mu$ic i$ the Door gave the song a good review, writing that "it [has] grown to be my fave after some listens". They mentioned that "it's quite a sunny song, if you get what I mean. Things are certainly looking bright for Laleh...".

Dagens Nyheter's Nanushka Yeaman enjoyed the Swedish sensibility of the song, commenting that it "sounds like a Håkan Hellström-hit by ABBA ambitions". A review from Göteborgs-Posten by Johan Lindqvist noted the song's lyrical content as "about both death and the spark of life [placed] into a pop song with the same intensity as Industriepark club. And, with that typical galloping rhythm Laleh apparently likes... great for upcoming concerts, would indeed be a cruel to open with it".

A negative review came from "Nöjesguiden" who wrote that there is "an existential desperation that lies between the lines on Vårens första dag".

== Chart performance ==
Following the release of Sjung on 25 January 2012, "Vårens första dag" managed to chart on the DigiListan, Sweden's digital-only singles chart, at number fifty-six due to strong downloads from the album. Its official release as a single was at the end of April. Following its first full week of official release, the single charted at number fifty-five on the DigiListan, furthering to number forty-three and thirty-nine in the following two weeks. The single eventually peaked at number nineteen on the DigiListan in July 2012.

== Music video ==
The music video was created by Sacarias Kiusalaas, a director who has previously worked with The Moniker, creating a music video and a short film for the Swedish singer's "Who Wants To Die Alone". It sees Laleh in a mansion house in the Swedish countryside singing and dancing in front of the camera in an upstairs room, whilst children outside play. The video was created to relate directly to the song, hence the use of vivid colours throughout and the playfulness of the clip. Angela Tryggveson was in charge of the make-up and hair direction in the shoot, as we see Laleh wear colourful eyeshadow and lipstick and the children with face paint during the scene in the woods. It was uploaded to YouTube on 25 April 2012 via Lost Army's official page. In addition to this, the Swedish Contemporary Circus company Cirkus Cirkör consulted on the video, with an input on the scene where the children have formed into a marching band and are doing acrobatics as well as playing drums, trumpets and other instruments.

== Personnel ==
- Laleh Pourkarim – vocals, record producer
- Gustaf Thörn – assistant producer, music
- Michael Ilbert – mixing
- David Hefti – assistant engineer
- Tom Coyne – mastering

== Radio date and release history ==
Region	Date	Format	Label
Sweden	17 March 2012	Mainstream radio airplay	Warner Music Sweden
Sweden	30 April 2012	Digital download	Warner Music Sweden
Denmark	30 April 2012	Digital download	Warner Music Sweden
Finland	30 April 2012	Digital download	Warner Music Sweden
Norway	30 April 2012	Digital download	Warner Music Sweden
