= Two Fux =

Single by Adam Lambert
- Released: June 30, 2017
- Genre: Pop; rock
- Length: 3:26
- Label: Warner Bros.
- Composers: Big Taste; Adam Lambert; Sarah Hudson; Ferras Alqaisi; Trey Campbell
- Producers: Mzwetwo; Big Taste

Adam Lambert singles chronology
"Welcome to the Show" (2016)	"Two Fux" (2017)	"Feel Something" (2019)

Lyric video
- "Adam Lambert - Two Fux [Lyric Video]" on YouTube

"Two Fux" is a song by American singer-songwriter Adam Lambert. The song was written by Big Taste, Adam Lambert, Sarah Hudson, Ferras and Trey Campbell, with production handled by Mzwetwo and Big Taste. It was released to digital retailers on June 30, 2017, through Warner Bros. Records.

== Background ==
"My last project was about the chase. This time I feel the strength of being exactly, unapologetically where I am. I’m standing my ground to inspire my fans to defy the status quo."

— Adam Lambert, lyrics video description

On June 22, 2017, Lambert published an instrumental audio preview on social media, which included the song's release date. On June 23, 2017, Lambert published another preview, revealing the song's title and artwork.

In an interview by Out magazine, talking about the lyrics, Lambert said: "This song was an idea that started with Sarah Hudson and Ferras, who are two dear friends of mine. I've known them for years and we've written together a handful of times. This is the first time something has solidified for us, where I was like, 'This is it. Let's put this out.' It's great because every time we get in the studio, it's all laughter and ridiculousness. We have a lot of fun together." Lambert said that the song is "basically a mission statement".

"That chorus, saying, if you think what I do and how I live is too much, I don't really give two fucks. You know, the world we're living in right now is a little scary. There's a lot of hatred out there and a lot of negativity. Our country’s politically and socially divided. And to be able to put out a song that addresses everything, saying, 'Look, you may not like me, but I'm not going to let that take me down. I'm not going to let that ruin my day. I'm going to do me.' I think people want some of those self-strengths. It makes me feel good to listen to it, and hopefully it makes others feel good. It's not taking itself too serious—the lyrics are ridiculous and silly, and I think it'll give people a reason to smile."

When asked about how the song speak to where he is at mentally, he said: "'Two Fux,' to me, kind of sums it up. I've been writing a lot in the past about chasing the original high—I was longing for something that was out of reach. And now with this project, I'm at a place in my life where I'm like, 'You know what, no—I'm cool.' I'm just going to do my shit and not really make any apologies for it—not really try to be such a people pleaser. I think everyone has these upswings and downswings in their life where they're trying to figure out where they're at, and right now I'm at a place of feeling a lot more self-assured."

When asked whether the song is a precursor to a forthcoming album release, a Warner Bros. Records rep told Variety that the singer "has recorded 'several new songs' and that several more track releases planned."

== Critical reception ==
Sabrina Finkelstein of Billboard wrote that the lyrics are "very fitting for pride month". Shirley Halperin of Variety wrote: "For 'Two Fux,' the singer comes back around to his sweet spot — vocal falsettos and mid-tempo pop hooks — with the confidence of someone who seems, musically, at least, finally content with his life. Or at least that what the line 'Namaste right here' suggests." Bianca Gracie of Fuse wrote: "The pop powerhouse brushes off the haters who have issues with his life choices ever so casually atop a soaring, electric guitar-dotted production." Melanie Gomez of CelebMix called the song "an edgy mood boosting track", with "empowering lyrics".

== Live performances ==
On June 22, 2017, Lambert made his debut of the song on the American late-night talk show Jimmy Kimmel Live!, as part of Queen's mini-concert. Talking about the live performances with Queen in the interview with Out magazine, Lambert said: "It's been great. I had the opportunity to play Brian [May] and Roger [Taylor] some of the stuff I'm working on, right now, when we started tour rehearsals two weeks back. Brian immediately called me after I sent him "Two Fux" over email and he said, "I can't get it out of my head. I listened to it once and it's stuck already." I said, "That's a good sign, don't you think?" We started talking about it and decided to play it on the road. The song has a sort of glam sensibility to it, so it's something that was not a big stretch for the band to adapt to."

== Credits and personnel ==
Credits adapted from Tidal.

- Adam Lambert – composing, vocals
- Big Taste – composing, producing, engineering, vocal producing, bass guitar, drum programming, electric guitar, piano, synthesizer programming
- Sarah Hudson – composing, vocal producing
- Ferras – composing, background vocals, vocal producing
- Trey Campbell – composing
- Mzwetwo – producing, percussion

== Charts ==
Chart performance for "Two Fux"
Chart (2017)	Peak position
Czech Republic Airplay (ČNS IFPI)	72
Finland Download (Latauslista)	1
Hungary (Single Top 40)	19
Poland Airplay (ZPAV)	47
