= Petroleum och tång =

Studio album by Eva Dahlgren
- Released: November 14, 2007
- Recorded: Studios 301 (Stockholm, Sweden)
- Genre: Swedish pop
- Length: 49 minutes
- Label: EMI Music Sweden

Eva Dahlgren chronology
En blekt blondins ballader (2007)	Petroleum och tång (2007)	Tid (2012)

Petroleum och tång was released on 14 November 2007, and is a studio album by Eva Dahlgren, with her ballad hit songs between 1980-2005.

== Track listing ==
1. Petroleum och tång
2. Vad andra gör
3. Jag är inte fri
4. Novemberregn
5. Ingen är som jag
6. Skuggorna faller över dig
7. När jag såg dig
8. Varje dag
9. Du och jag
10. Ord
11. Syre och eld

== Contributors ==
- Eva Dahlgren - singer, guitar, composer, lyrics
- Lars Halapi - guitar, percussion, steel guitar, synthesizer, producer
- Peter Forss - bass
- Måns Block - drums
- Christer Karlsson - piano
- Stockholm Session Strings - musicians

== Charts ==
Chart (2007–2008)	Peak position
Finland	17
Sweden	3
