= Simon Says (Laleh song) =

Single by Laleh

from the album Me and Simon
- Released: 12 January 2009
- Recorded: 2008
- Genre: Pop
- Length: 3:55
- Label: Warner Music Sweden
- Songwriter(s): Laleh Pourkarim
- Producer(s): Laleh Pourkarim

Laleh singles chronology
"Snö" (2007)	"Simon Says" (2009)	"Big City Love" (2009)

"Simon Says" is a song by Iranian-Swedish singer-songwriter Laleh from her third studio album, Me and Simon which was released as the lead single of the album on 12 January 2009. The song peaked at No. 41 on the Swedish Singles Chart.

== Music video ==
The music video was shot in Skellefteå, Sweden and directed by Martin Fodor-Nilsson who also directed the music videos for "Invisible (My Song)", "Storebror", and "Live Tomorrow".

== Track listing ==
1. "Simon Says" – 3:55

== Charts ==
Chart (2009)	Peak position
Swedish Singles Chart	41
