= Sjung =

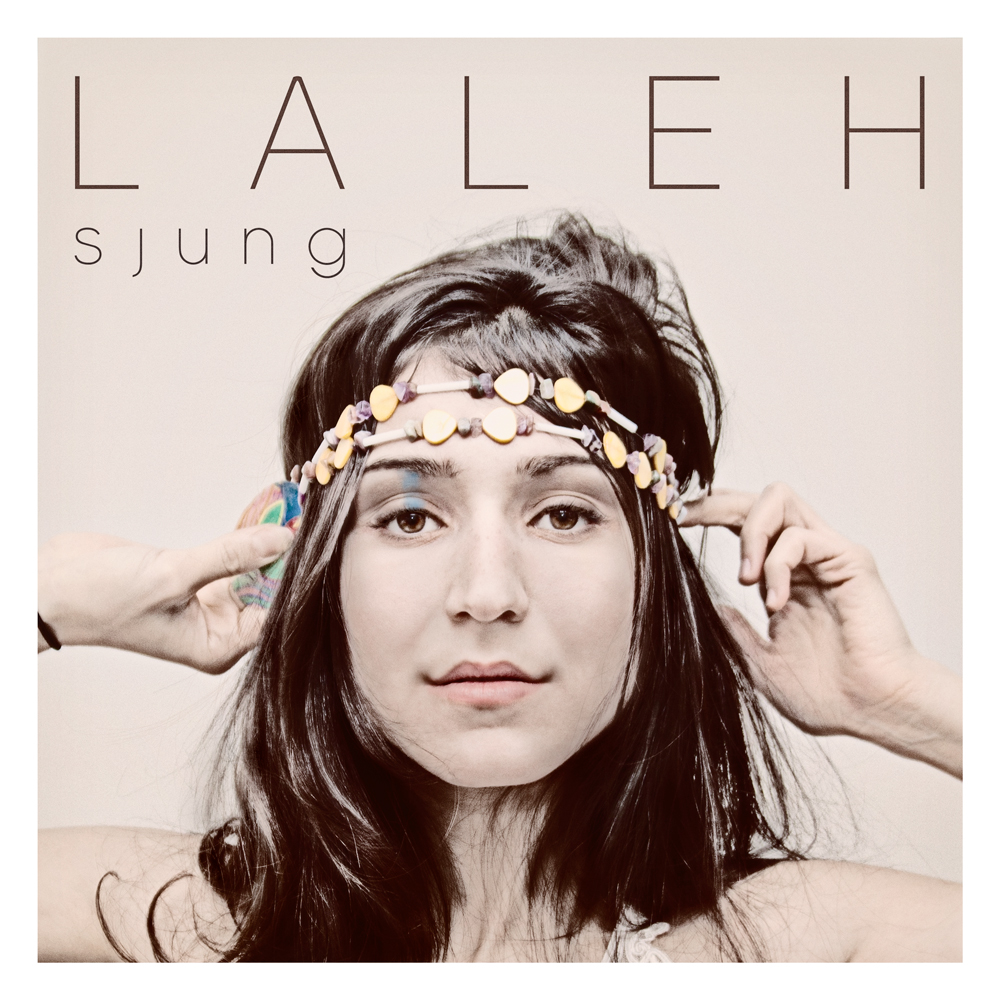

Studio album by Laleh
- Released: 25 January 2012
- Recorded: Hansa Mix Room (Berlin, Germany); Edenheadroom (Stockholm, Sweden); Sterling Sound (New York, United States); Cutting Room Studios (Stockholm, Sweden)
- Genres: Pop rock, folk pop, synthpop
- Length: 40:02
- Label: Lost Army / Warner Music Sweden
- Producers: Laleh Pourkarim, Gustaf Thörn

Laleh chronology
Me and Simon (2009)	Sjung (2012)	Colors (2013)

Singles from Sjung
- 1. "Some Die Young" Released: 22 January 2012; 2. "Vårens Första Dag" Released: 30 April 2012

Sjung (Swedish: [ˈɧɵŋː], "Sing") is the fourth studio album by the Swedish singer-songwriter Laleh, released on 25 January 2012. Produced by Laleh herself, the album was released on Warner Music Sweden and Lost Army. Sjung is her first long play for four years since the January 2009 album Me and Simon. The album is produced, written, recorded, engineered and performed by Laleh. The release follows her appearance on popular Swedish television show "Så mycket bättre" towards the end of 2011.

The album's lyrical theme centres on new environments and being an outsider, with elements of African drums and synthpop being incorporated into Laleh's sound for the first time. The physical release of the album contains a second disc which features her interpretations from "Så mycket bättre". All of these interpretations were also released as a digital download only extended play preceding the album on 25 December 2011 called Tolkningarna (Interpretations). Critics' opinions of the album were generally favourable although some were divided on the slightly new direction taken and the unevenness of the record. In its first week of release, the album entered the Swedish Albums Chart at number one, becoming her second album to peak at the top, and her first to debut at number one. It was at the top of the charts for four non-consecutive weeks and was certified platinum in March 2012. It also became her first-charting album in Norway, where it debuted at number eight and peaked at number one.

The first single from the album was "Some Die Young", which was released in Sweden on 22 January. The song was performed by Laleh for the first time at the "P3 Guld Awards" on 21 January in Gothenburg. She performed alongside other artists including Veronica Maggio, First Aid Kit and Fibes, Oh Fibes! at the Sveriges Radio P3 event. "Vårens Första Dag" was released as the album's second single on 30 April 2012. "What You Want" was originally due to be released as the album's third single, but was scrapped in favour of "Elephant", which was sent out to radio in early 2013. In July 2013 it was announced that Laleh would release her first international album in Germany during the autumn. The first single from this release will be "Some Die Young".

== Promotion ==
It was announced on 14 May 2011, that Laleh would be participating in the second season of TV4's popular Swedish reality television show "Så mycket bättre" (So much better). The announcement by the channel also confirmed that fellow Swedish artists, Timbuktu, Eva Dahlgren, Lena Philipsson, E-Type, Tomas Ledin and Mikael Wiehe would be participating. The program involves established artists living together for eight days on the Swedish island of Gotland. Each artist has a day dedicated to them, with the other artists attempting to produce a new interpretation of one of the singer's songs. The show, which is based on a Dutch format, then sees the artists gather together at the end of the day around a dinner table to listen to what has been produced. You also get a glimpse of their time together. The show began filming on 11 June 2011. The show began broadcasting on TV4 across Sweden on 29 October 2011 and, for the first two episodes, worldwide on the channel's online catch-up service, TV4 Play. Her performances on the show were lauded by both critics and the public, with her first five performances topping the Swedish iTunes chart. Her rendition of Eva Dahlgren's "Ängeln i rummet" became the highest-peaking song on the Swedish Singles Chart released from the show's second season and was also nominated for "Swedish Song of the Year" at the Gaygalan Awards. Following the show, it was commonly noted in the media that she had been given "a second breakthrough".

It was originally proposed that her album would be released in the fourth quarter of 2011 to capitalise on her higher profile from the show, but this was later scrapped. In December 2011, details of the album and an accompanying "big band" stadium tour emerged, of which all of the major newspapers ran stories on their website about. The fifteen-date tour to promote the album began on 3 March 2012 in Uppsala and ended on 29 April 2012 in Norrköping, with all of the major cities included. The biggest date on the tour was in Laleh's home town Gothenburg where she performed in front of 6,370 people at the Scandinavium on 20 April.

Promotion for the album started in earnest in January, when she performed lead single "Some Die Young" for the first time at the "P3 Guld Awards" organised by Swedish youth-orientated radio station SR P3 on 21 January. The event was broadcast the next day on SVT1. Laleh also performed the single and was interviewed by Fredrik Skavlan on the popular Norwegian-Swedish prime-time talk show "Skavlan". The programme, which is a co-production between NRK and SVT, was shown in both countries and is also shown on BBC Entertainment at a later date.

== Reception ==
=== Critical response ===
Professional ratings
Review scores
Source	Rating
Aftonbladet	3/5 stars
Arbetarbladet	3/5 stars
Dagens Nyheter	4/5 stars
Dalarnas Tidningar	4/5 stars
Expressen	4/5 stars
Göteborgs-Posten	3/5 stars
Helsingborgs Dagblad	3/5 stars
Metro	3/5 stars
Nerikes Allehanda	4/5 stars
Nöjesguiden	3/6 stars
Nya Wermlands-Tidningen	4/5 stars
Svenska Dagbladet	3/6 stars
Sydsvenskan	4/5 stars
Uppsala Nya Tidning	3/5 stars

Sjung received mostly positive reviews from music critics. The Swedish website, Kritiker, which assigns a normalised rating out of 5.0 to reviews from mainstream critics across the country gave the album an average score of 3.5, based on 25 reviews, which indicates favourable reviews. This score was just below that given to her debut album, and improved upon her previous two albums. Markus Larsson of Aftonbladet compared Laleh to Canadian singer Feist, saying that "Feist's music sometimes feels like Laleh's big sister". He went on to say that the album is like a "Spotify-list of Laleh favourites" with "multiple influences that haunts today's most modern pop music". He ends by calling this Laleh's "second breakthrough". Anders Jaderup of Sydsvenskan praised the album for being less sprawling than her previous releases and stepping "towards conventional mainstreampop without losing either the personality or the mixture of seriousness and fun as always influenced her music". He picked out "Vårens första dag" (Spring's First Day) as showing "exuberant energy" and being a "great pop song". In a review for local newspaper Norran, Per Strömbro praised Laleh's producing and said that the record was "often quite grand, with big words and concepts". Nanushka Yeaman from Dagens Nyheter praised the personal feel to the album which is "nice and touching". They went on to say that "this is Laleh's strongest album to date and there is no doubt that she will take festival-Sweden this summer". Anders Nunstedt, music editor from the Swedish tabloid Expressen, said the album may well be the "year's big Swedish pop record". He noted that "the step from African rhythms [on "Elephant"] to the Abba-drama that bloom in the chorus of "Some Die Young" is great, and that the gentle soul which appears in "Who Started It" is at another musical discipline than the feverish indie pop that stains the "Vårens Första Dag", but Laleh's songs connect... in spite of all genres and language changes".

Metro critic Peter Lindholm gave a mixed review of the album, saying that it "is full of impressions of other artists", but added that "Laleh absorbs influences from all possible directions and moves effortlessly between languages". Peter Carlsson in Nerikes Allehanda said that the album is "her best to date, although it feels somewhat disturbing that eight of the eleven songs are in English and three in Swedish". Linn Dupont in Helsingborgs Dagblad said that the album "is straight and direct. Laleh stays on the mat, but still flying among the clouds in her own charming way. "Vårens första dag" has already been praised. I understand why. Laleh is best in Swedish and so here too. But the bonus songs from "Så mycket bättre' does not make any difference. Her fourth album feels like "Easy with Laleh" – easy for those who did not have her music for themselves before". She ends by noting that "2005 [was] Laleh's year. Now it's time again, along with a new audience". The Uppsala Nya Tidning gave the album a mixed review, stating that "the main problem with Sing is that it is an uneven album. Sprawling in the wrong way. And there is something irritating in this by mixing English songs with some Swedish. I do not buy it... Laleh loses momentum and it pulls down the score". It finishes by saying that it is still "Laleh's best album to date" However, Svenska Dagbladet's Dan Backman took a dislike to the album, saying that she got "a second breakthrough by TV4 series Så mycket bättre... unfortunately, she follows up the success of cover songs from Så mycket bättre with a largely pretty weak album", believing that the record was produced for radio, ultimately reducing the quality of the music. He also commented on the bonus disc's recordings from the TV show by noting that "when decoupled from the ingratiating performer cosiness at the dinner table... are painfully flat".

=== Commercial performance ===
Upon its release, Sjung debuted at number one on the Swedish Album Chart for the week of 3 February 2012. This became Laleh's second number one album, following her self-titled debut's peak at the position 44 weeks after entering the list. The album continued its run at number one for two more weeks, before dropping to number two. It stayed within the top five until its tenth week on release where it placed sixth. In its twelfth week of release the album returned to the top of the charts. On 20 March 2012 the album was certified gold and platinum in Sweden, signalling shipping of over 40,000 units.

In Norway, Sjung became Laleh's first charting album, entering the VG-lista at number eight. In its second week, the album stayed in the same position before falling out of the top ten in its third week. It returned the following week at number ten, before jumping to eight once again. The album recorded a new peak on 23 March of number seven and continued to rise in the following weeks 6–5–1.

== Singles ==
"Some Die Young" was released as the album's lead single on 22 January 2012. It reached a peak of number nine on the Sverigetopplistan and number two on the DigiListan in Sweden. It also became a massive success in Norway, peaking at number one for seven consecutive weeks after being on the list for eight weeks. It peaked at number thirty-eight in Denmark. The song garnered positive response by music critics in Sweden. Expressen, described the song as "great", with its "Abba-drama that blooms in the chorus". Peter Carlsson in Nerikes Allehanda noted that the song was "[refrained] like "Elephant" and "What You Want", but it is perhaps, above all, the high-quality smoothness that will impress in the long run". The song's music video premiered on the Aftonbladet website and Lost Army's official YouTube page on 26 January 2012.

Due to downloads from the album, "Vårens Första Dag" also managed to chart on the DigiListan at number fifty-six following the release of the album. It was the second single released from the album, sent out to radio in mid-March and released on 30 April 2012.

The album's physical release contains a second disc which features six songs previously available on the digital only extended play, Tolkningarna, and the Så mycket bättre season two compilation albums. Of these, four songs charted on the Sverigetopplistan in 2011. The first of these was Laleh's cover of Tomas Ledin's "Just nu", which peaked at number twenty-five. The interpretation of Eva Dahlgren's "Ängeln i rummet" peaked at number six. The song became her highest selling and peaking record to date in Sweden and remained in the top 40 for thirteen weeks. It was nominated for "Swedish Song of the Year" at the Gaygalan Awards. The rendition of "Alla vill till himmelen men ingen vill dö" by Timbuktu peaked at number twenty-five. During the course of Bättre, Laleh's interpretation of the song was chosen as the best from that week. Scandipop said of the song "we're still unconvinced by that one", but admitted "we're seemingly behind the rest of Sweden – as it’s joined the former two songs in the heights of the Swedish iTunes chart, resulting in an all Laleh top". The sole English language cover, E-Type's "Here I Go Again", peaked at number forty-one in its first week on the chart, as well as entering at number one on the downloads chart. During the showings of "Så mycket bättre", Laleh broke a Swedish digital chart record by having ten songs on the top sixty list, including nine inside the top 40. Two interpretations of her songs from the show by other artists also appeared, to bring a total of twelve songs she had involvement with in the chart at once.

== Track listing ==
No.	Title	Writer(s)	Producer(s)	Length
1.	"Elephant"	Laleh Pourkarim	Pourkarim, Gustaf Thörn	4:09
2.	"Some Die Young"	Pourkarim	Pourkarim	3:48
3.	"Who Started It"	Pourkarim	Pourkarim, Thörn	4:45
4.	"Interlude"	Pourkarim	Pourkarim	1:42
5.	"Samuel"	Pourkarim	Pourkarim	3:42
6.	"Better Life"	Pourkarim	Pourkarim, Thörn	3:24
7.	"What You Want"	Pourkarim	Pourkarim	3:14
8.	"In the Comet"	Pourkarim	Pourkarim	4:15
9.	"Vårens första dag" (Spring's First Day)	Pourkarim	Pourkarim, Thörn	4:41
10.	"Du följer med mig" (You Come with Me)	Pourkarim	Pourkarim	4:37
11.	"Sjung" (Sing)	Pourkarim	Pourkarim, Thörn	3:45

"Tolkningarna" CD bonus tracks
No.	Title	Writer(s)	Producer(s)	Length
1.	"På gatan där jag bor" (On the street where I live)	Thomas Eriksson	Pourkarim	2:52
2.	"Just nu" (Right Now)	Tomas Ledin	Pourkarim	4:00
3.	"Alla vill till himmelen men ingen vill dö" (Everyone wants to heaven but nobody wants to die)	Måns Asplund, Jason Diakité	Pourkarim	2:32
4.	"Ängeln i rummet" (Angel in the Room)	Eva Dahlgren	Pourkarim	4:13
5.	"Here I Go Again"	Martin Eriksson, Mud	Pourkarim	3:18
6.	"Fred (Till Melanie)" (Peace (For Melanie))	Mikael Wiehe	Pourkarim	3:59

== Personnel ==
The following are credited on the album:

- Laleh Pourkarim – vocals (all tracks); producer; engineer; photography; cover design
- Gustaf Thörn – assistant producer (tracks 1, 3, 6, 9, 11); music (tracks 6, 9, 11); photography; cover design
- Michael Ilbert – mixing (tracks 4–7, 9–11)
- David Hefti – assistant engineer (tracks 4–7, 9–11)
- Henrik Edenhed – mixing (tracks 1–3, 8)
- Tom Coyne – mastering (track 1, 3–11)
- Björn Engelmann – mastering (track 2)
- Isabelle Lundh – fashion design
- Lelle Hannu – layout

Tolkningarna

- Laleh Pourkarim – vocals (all tracks); backing vocals
- Tom Coyne – mastering (tracks 2, 4)
- Henrik Jonsson – mastering (tracks 1, 3, 5–6)
- Stefan Olsson – guitar, synth, percussion
- Anders Hedlund – drums
- David Lindvall – bass
- Erik Arvinder – violin
- Samuel Starck – synth
- Christian Walz – synth, backing vocals
- Christos Gontevas – backing vocals

== Charts and certifications ==
=== Weekly charts ===
Chart (2012)	Peak position
Norwegian Albums (VG-lista)	1
Swedish Albums (Sverigetopplistan)	1

=== Year-end charts ===
Chart (2012)	Position
Swedish Albums (Sverigetopplistan)	2

=== Certifications ===
Region	Certification	Certified units/sales
Sweden (GLF)	Platinum	40,000^{‡}
^{‡} Sales+streaming figures based on certification alone.

== Release history ==
Country	Date	Format	Label
Sweden	25 January 2012	Digital download, CD, vinyl record	Warner Music Sweden
Denmark	25 January 2012	Digital download	Warner Music Sweden
Finland	25 January 2012	Digital download, CD, vinyl record	Warner Music Sweden
Norway	25 January 2012	Digital download, CD, vinyl record	Warner Music Norway
Denmark	30 January 2012	CD, vinyl record	Metronome / Warner Music Sweden

== See also ==
- List of number-one albums in Sweden
- List of number-one albums in Norway
