= Senecionine N-oxygenase =

Class of enzymes

Identifiers
- EC no.: 1.14.13.101
- CAS no.: 220581-68-0

Databases
- IntEnz: IntEnz view
- BRENDA: BRENDA entry
- ExPASy: NiceZyme view
- KEGG: KEGG entry
- MetaCyc: metabolic pathway
- PRIAM: profile
- PDB structures: RCSB PDB PDBe PDBsum
Search
- PMC: articles
- PubMed: articles
- NCBI: proteins

In enzymology, a senecionine N-oxygenase (EC 1.14.13.101) is an enzyme that catalyzes the chemical reaction

senecionine + NADPH + H^{+} + O_{2} $\rightleftharpoons$ senecionine N-oxide + NADP^{+} + H_{2}O

The 4 substrates of this enzyme are senecionine, NADPH, H^{+}, and O_{2}, whereas its 3 products are senecionine N-oxide, NADP^{+}, and H_{2}O.

This enzyme belongs to the family of oxidoreductases, specifically those acting on paired donors, with O_{2} as oxidant and incorporation or reduction of oxygen. The oxygen incorporated need not be derived from O_{2} with NADH or NADPH as one donor, and incorporation of one atom o oxygen into the other donor. The systematic name of this enzyme class is senecionine,NADPH:oxygen oxidoreductase (N-oxide-forming). Other names in common use include senecionine monooxygenase (N-oxide-forming) and SNO.
