= Bara få va mig själv =

Single by Laleh

from the album Kristaller
- Released: 6 April 2016
- Genre: Indie pop
- Length: 3:34
- Label: Warner Music Sweden; Lost Army
- Songwriters: Laleh Pourkarim; Gustaf Thörn; Gino Yonan; Frank Nobel
- Producer: Laleh Pourkarim

Laleh singles chronology
"Sol, vind och vatten" (2015)	"Bara få va mig själv" (2016)	"Aldrig bli som förr" (2016)

Music video
- "Bara få va mig själv" on YouTube

"Bara få va mig själv" is a song by Swedish singer-songwriter Laleh, taken as the first single from her sixth studio album, Kristaller. It was written by Laleh, Gustaf Thörn, Gino Yonan, and Frank Nobel while being produced by Laleh. It was released on 6 April 2016 through Warner Music Sweden.

It is her highest-charting song on the Sverigetopplistan, peaking at number five, and was nominated for Song of the Year at the 2017 Grammis.

== Background and composition ==
After a period of work as songwriter and producer in the United States, where she worked with artists such as Demi Lovato, Tori Kelly and Adam Levine, she returned to Sweden and released "Bara få va mig själv" as the lead single off her sixth album Kristaller. The song was first released exclusively to radio stations and Spotify on 6 May 2016, and was made available on all platforms two days later, the same day that tickets for the Kristaller Tour went on sale. All of her previous lead singles had been in English, with this marking her first in Swedish.

Laleh said the song was "a story about finding your own voice and the difference between learning from others and being controlled by others" while A Bit of Pop Music described it as "one of the most poppy and upbeat things she has released," adding that it was a "sure-fire hit." Scandipop called it a "rousing, beat-driven pop number."

== Commercial performance ==
The song debuted on the Sverigetopplistan Singles Top 100 at number 16 on the chart dated 15 April 2016 and later peaked at number five on its sixth week, becoming her highest-charting song. It remained on the official Swedish chart for a total of 68 non-consecutive weeks.

It also reached number one on the Svensktoppen on 3 July, a spot it sat in as late as October, and peaked at number five on the DigiListan chart tracking digital sales on 22 May.

In December, it was announced that Bara få va mig själv was the year's most-streamed Swedish song on Spotify, with over 30 million plays.

== Music video ==
The official music video, directed and edited by Laleh herself, was released on 8 April 2016, the same day the song was released for digital download. It was filmed in Los Angeles, where Laleh had recently moved to. As of August 2021 the video has over 15 million views on YouTube.

== Awards and nominations ==
Organization	Year	Award	Result	Ref.
P3 Guld Awards	2017	Song of the Year	Nominated	
Gaygalan Awards	2017	Swedish Song of the Year	Won	
Grammis Awards	2017	Song of the Year	Nominated	

== Charts and certifications ==
=== Weekly charts ===
Chart (2016)	Peak position
Sweden (Sverigetopplistan)	5

=== Year-end charts ===
Chart (2016)	Position
Sweden (Sverigetopplistan)	17

=== Certifications ===
Region	Certification	Certified units/sales
Sweden (GLF)	4× Platinum	160,000^{‡}
^{‡} Sales+streaming figures based on certification alone.
