= Colors (Laleh album) =

Studio album by Laleh
- Released: 16 October 2013
- Genre: Pop rock; Folk-pop; Synthpop
- Length: 38:58
- Label: Lost Army / Warner Music Sweden
- Producer: Laleh Pourkarim

Laleh chronology
Sjung (2012)	Colors (2013)	Kristaller (2016)

Singles from Colors
- 1. "Colors"; 2. "Stars Align"

Colors is the fifth studio album by the Swedish singer-songwriter Laleh, released on 16 October 2013. Produced by Laleh herself, the album was released on Warner Music Sweden and Lost Army. The album is, as usual, produced, written, recorded, engineered and performed by Laleh.

No.	Title	Length
1.	"Speaking of Truth"	4:23
2.	"Colors"	3:37
3.	"Sway"	3:28
4.	"Dark Shadow"	3:08
5.	"Stars Align"	3:27
6.	"Wish I Could Stay"	3:45
7.	"Return to the Soil"	4:32
8.	"Goliat"	4:07
9.	"En stund på jorden" (A moment on earth)	3:53
10.	"Solen och dagen" (The sun and the day)	4:21
Total length:		38:58

== Charts ==
=== Weekly charts ===
Chart (2013–2014)	Peak position
Norway VG-lista	4
Sweden Sverigetopplistan	2

=== Year-end charts ===
Chart	Year	Position
Swedish Albums (Sverigetopplistan)	2017	48
Swedish Albums (Sverigetopplistan)	2018	56
Swedish Albums (Sverigetopplistan)	2019	50
Swedish Albums (Sverigetopplistan)	2020	49
Swedish Albums (Sverigetopplistan)	2021	93
