= Bjurö klubb =

Single by Laleh

from the album Me and Simon
- Released: 10 September 2009 (CD single); 14 September 2009 (Digital download)
- Recorded: 2008
- Genre: Pop
- Length: 4:54
- Label: Warner Music Sweden
- Songwriter(s): Laleh Pourkarim
- Producer(s): Laleh Pourkarim

Laleh singles chronology
"Big City Love" (2009)	"Bjurö klubb" (2009)	"Mysteries" (2010)

"Bjurö klubb" is a song by Swedish singer-songwriter Laleh. It was released as the third single from her album Me and Simon on 10 September 2009 and as a digital download on 14 September 2009. As her other songs, she has also written and produced this track. Despite the song's success, it didn't manage to break into the charts at the time of release. It has since reached number 38 on the Digilistan in December 2011 due to Laleh's appearance on Så mycket bättre.

"Bjurö klubb" is about the nature reserve in Skellefteå Municipality with the same name.

== Promotion ==
Laleh has performed the song on several television shows in Sweden such as Musikhjälpen, Popcirkus and Sommarkväll. The song was performed by Laleh on Musikhjälpen in December 2008 to promote her album Me and Simon which was released the next month. She performed the song on Popcirkus in February 2009. "Bjurö klubb" was also performed on Sommarkväll in July 2009.

== Track listing ==
1. "Bjurö klubb" – 4:54
