= Prinsessor =

Studio album by Laleh
- Released: 6 December 2006
- Recorded: 2006
- Genre: Pop, pop rock, folk rock
- Length: 44:40
- Label: Lost Army / Warner Music Sweden
- Producer: Laleh Pourkarim

Laleh chronology
Laleh (2005)	Prinsessor (2006)	Me and Simon (2009)

Singles from Prinsessor
- 1. "Det är vi som bestämmer (Vem har lurat alla barnen?)" Released: September 2006; 2. "November" Released: December 2006; 3. "Call on Me" Released: 13 February 2007; 4. "Closer" Released: October 2007

Professional ratings
Review scores
Source	Rating
Aftonbladet	2/5 stars
Helsingborgs Dagblad	3/5 stars
Svenska Dagbladet	3/6 stars
Uppsala Nya Tidning	3/5 stars

Prinsessor (Swedish for "Princesses") is the second studio album by Swedish singer-songwriter Laleh, released on 6 December 2006 on Warner Music Sweden Records. The album wasn't as successful as her debut album, peaking at number three on the Swedish Albums Chart. None of the album's singles managed to break into the charts.

== Description ==
Laleh described the album as following: "The album is called Prinsessor, it is named after a track from the album. There are twelve songs on the album in which one is an instrumental track and another classic, but some tough and some soft. As usual, I have been alone in the studio, which I love. However – after the fantastic experiences me and the band had together on our tours, it was time to invite my favorite little bunch to the studio, and they played on four of the songs.

It feels difficult to resist playing all of the instruments by myself because it's simply so incredibly fun and liberating – but they're so talented, besides, it requires other techniques to record several instruments at the same time, and as a technician it was fun to try it too. It was actually fun to form the music and work in this way as a producer, they understood what I wanted to access, so it worked."

== Track listing ==
All songs written, performed, recorded and produced by Laleh.

No.	Title	Length
1.	"Det är vi som bestämmer (Vem har lurat alla barnen?) (It is we who decide [Who fooled all the children?])"	4:12
2.	"Mamma (Mom)"	3:53
3.	"Closer"	2:53
4.	"Call on Me"	3:29
5.	"Prinsessor (Princesses)"	4:19
6.	"November"	3:48
7.	"Your Town"	3:48
8.	"Step on You"	3:44
9.	"I Know This"	4:11
10.	"Part Two"	2:20
11.	"Far har lärt mig (Father has taught me)"	3:25
12.	"12"	3:25
Total length:		44:40

== Credits ==
=== Additional personnel ===
- Magnus Larsson – bass (on tracks 1, 3, 7, 9)
- Oscar Gezelius – drums (on tracks 1, 3, 7, 9)
- Henrik Ekberg – guitar (on tracks 1, 3, 7, 9)

=== Production ===
- Mastering: Henrik Johnson
- Mixing: Henrik Edenhed
- Photography: Laleh, Oscar Gezelius

== Charts ==
=== Weekly charts ===
Chart (2006)	Peak position
Swedish Albums (Sverigetopplistan)	3

=== Year-end charts ===
Chart (2006)	Position
Swedish Albums (Sverigetopplistan)	64
Chart (2007)	Position
Swedish Albums (Sverigetopplistan)	55
