= Just nu! =

1980 song by Tomas Ledin

Single by Tomas Ledin
- Language: Swedish
- Released: 1980
- Songwriter: Tomas Ledin

Eurovision Song Contest 1980 entry
- Country: Sweden
- Artist: Tomas Ledin
- Language: Swedish
- Composer: Tomas Ledin
- Lyricist: Tomas Ledin
- Conductor: Anders Berglund

Finals performance
- Final result: 10th
- Final points: 47

Entry chronology
- ◄ "Satellit" (1979)
- "Fångad i en dröm" (1981) ►

"Just nu!" (Swedish pronunciation: [jɵst ˈnʉː]; "Right now!") is a song written and performed by Tomas Ledin. It represented Sweden in the Eurovision Song Contest 1980 after winning Melodifestivalen 1980.

The song talks about a man tired of the monotonous life in the city, in that moment he wants to live his life, he wants to feel the air in his lungs and perhaps to travel to Paris.

The song was performed 8th on the night, following Denmark's Bamses Venner with "Tænker altid på dig" and preceding Switzerland's Paola with "Cinéma". At the close of voting, it had received 47 points, placing 10th in a field of 19.

It was succeeded as Swedish representative at the 1981 contest by Björn Skifs with "Fångad i en dröm".

During the performance the cable was accidentally unplugged from Tomas Ledin's microphone. He managed to plug it just before the start of the second verse.

== Charts ==
Chart (1980)	Peak position
Swedish Singles Chart	1

== Laleh version ==
"Just nu"

Song by Laleh

from the album Tolkningarna
- Released: 30 October 2011
- Recorded: Studio 78, Waketi Street
- Genre: Folk pop, psychedelic folk, synthpop, pop
- Length: 4:00
- Label: TV4 / Universal Music Sweden / Lost Army / Warner Music Sweden
- Composer: Tomas Ledin
- Lyricist: Tomas Ledin
- Producer: Laleh Pourkarim

Swedish singer-songwriter Laleh, covered "Just nu!" as part of reality television series Så mycket bättre. Although not officially released as a single, the song was available digitally in Sweden as part of the weekly compilations that accompanied the series, on 30 October 2011, released by Universal Music Sweden in conjunction with TV4. It was later included on her extended play of all of the interpretations included on the show, titled Tolkningarna on 25 December 2011, released by Lost Army and Warner Music Sweden. Furthermore, Tolkningarna was released as a bonus disc on the physical versions of Laleh's fourth studio album, Sjung, released on 25 January 2012.

As part of Så mycket bättre, artists have to create interpretations of the other competitors well-known songs on a weekly basis. The show broadcast on 29 October 2011 focused on Tomas Ledin, who was also taking part in the series. Laleh reworked Ledin's pop rock Eurovision entry and created a psychedelic folk pop song with elements of synthesisers and strings. This was the first week of the program, and saw Laleh soon emerge as the favourite with her interpretations. Laleh's version of "Just nu!" entered the Sverigetopplistan at number fifty in its first week. Aided by extensive support from Sveriges Radio P3, "Just nu" climbed up the chart to peak at number twenty-five, Laleh's first song to enter the top thirty since "Snö in January 2007.

=== Critical reception ===
The rendition was met with mainly positive reviews, with the British-based Scandinavian music website Scandipop describing it as addictive due to the "infectiously creepy and retro psychedelic [qualities]". Despite this, an extra verse which was added by Laleh to the original was criticised. Dan Backman argued that "the fact that she added a new melody to Tomas Ledin's "Just nu" seems quite stupid when it is hardly the text that is worth highlighting".

=== Personnel ===
- Laleh Pourkarim – vocals, producer
- Tom Coyne – mastering
- David Lindvall – bass
- Erik Arvinder – violin
- Anders Hedlund – drums
- Stefan Olsson – guitar, synth, percussion
- Christian Walz – synth, backing vocals
- Christos Gontevas – backing vocals

=== Charts ===
Chart (2011)	Peak position
Swedish Singles Chart	25

== External list ==
- Information about the song
