= Ängeln i rummet =

2011 song by Eva Dahlgren

Single by Eva Dahlgren

from the album Fria världen 1.989
- B-side: "Kyssen"
- Released: February 1989
- Genre: Adult contemporary, pop
- Label: BMG Sweden / Big Mama Music
- Songwriter: Eva Dahlgren

Eva Dahlgren singles chronology
"Ängeln i rummet" (1989)	"Gunga mig" (1991)

"Ängeln i rummet" (Swedish for "The Angel in the Room") is a single released by Swedish singer Eva Dahlgren from the 1989 album Fria Världen 1.989 released through BMG and Big Mama Music. Peaking at number four in 1989, it is her highest-charting song ever, tied with "Vem tänder stjärnorna?" in 1991.

The song won a Grammis for Song of the Year. Dahlgren also performs an English version of the song called "Angel in My Room". The song was covered in 2011 by Laleh, whose version reached number six in Sweden.

== Charts ==
Chart (1989)	Peak position
Finland (Suomen virallinen lista)	21
Sweden (Sverigetopplistan)	4

== Laleh version ==
"Ängeln i rummet"

Song by Laleh

from the album Tolkningarna
- Released: 6 November 2011
- Recorded: Studio 78, Waketi Street
- Genre: Indie pop, synthpop
- Length: 4:13
- Label: TV4 / Universal Music Sweden / Lost Army / Warner Music Sweden
- Songwriter: Eva Dahlgren
- Producers: Laleh Pourkarim, Christian Walz

Swedish singer-songwriter Laleh, covered "Ängeln i rummet" as part of reality television series Så mycket bättre. Although not officially released as a single, the song was available digitally in Sweden as part of the weekly compilations that accompanied the series, on 6 November 2011, released by Universal Music Sweden in conjunction with TV4. It was later included on her extended play of all of the interpretations included on the show, titled Tolkningarna on 25 December 2011, released by Lost Army and Warner Music Sweden. Furthermore Tolkningarna was released as a bonus disc on the physical versions of Laleh's fourth studio album, Sjung, released on 25 January 2012.

As part of Så mycket bättre, artists have to create interpretations of the other competitors well-known songs on a weekly basis. The show broadcast on 5 November 2011 focused on Eva Dahlgren, who was also taking part in the series. Laleh reworked Dahlgren's slow intimate pop ballad and created a synth-driven upbeat indie pop song. This was the second week of the program, following the Tomas Ledin episode. At the time, Laleh's version of Just nu! was charting on the Sverigetopplistan at number fifty. "Ängeln i rummet" became a bigger hit, helped by extensive support by Sveriges Radio P3, and eventually peaked at number six in Sweden, Laleh's best chart placing in the country. The interpretation went on to become the season's most downloaded track, remaining in the top 40 for thirteen weeks.

=== Critical reception ===
Scandipop enjoyed the song's "pure and unaffected ability to induce a rousing bout of feel-good", although noted that it took them a while to be convinced by the song, along with her version of "Just nu". It was nominated for "Swedish Song of the Year" at the Gaygalan Awards.

=== Personnel ===
- Laleh Pourkarim – vocals, producer
- Tom Coyne – mastering
- Stefan Olsson – guitar, synth, percussion
- Christian Walz – synth, backing vocals
- Christos Gontevas – backing vocals

=== Charts ===
Chart (2011)	Peak position
Sweden (Sverigetopplistan)	6
