= My Little Pony: Equestria Girls discography =

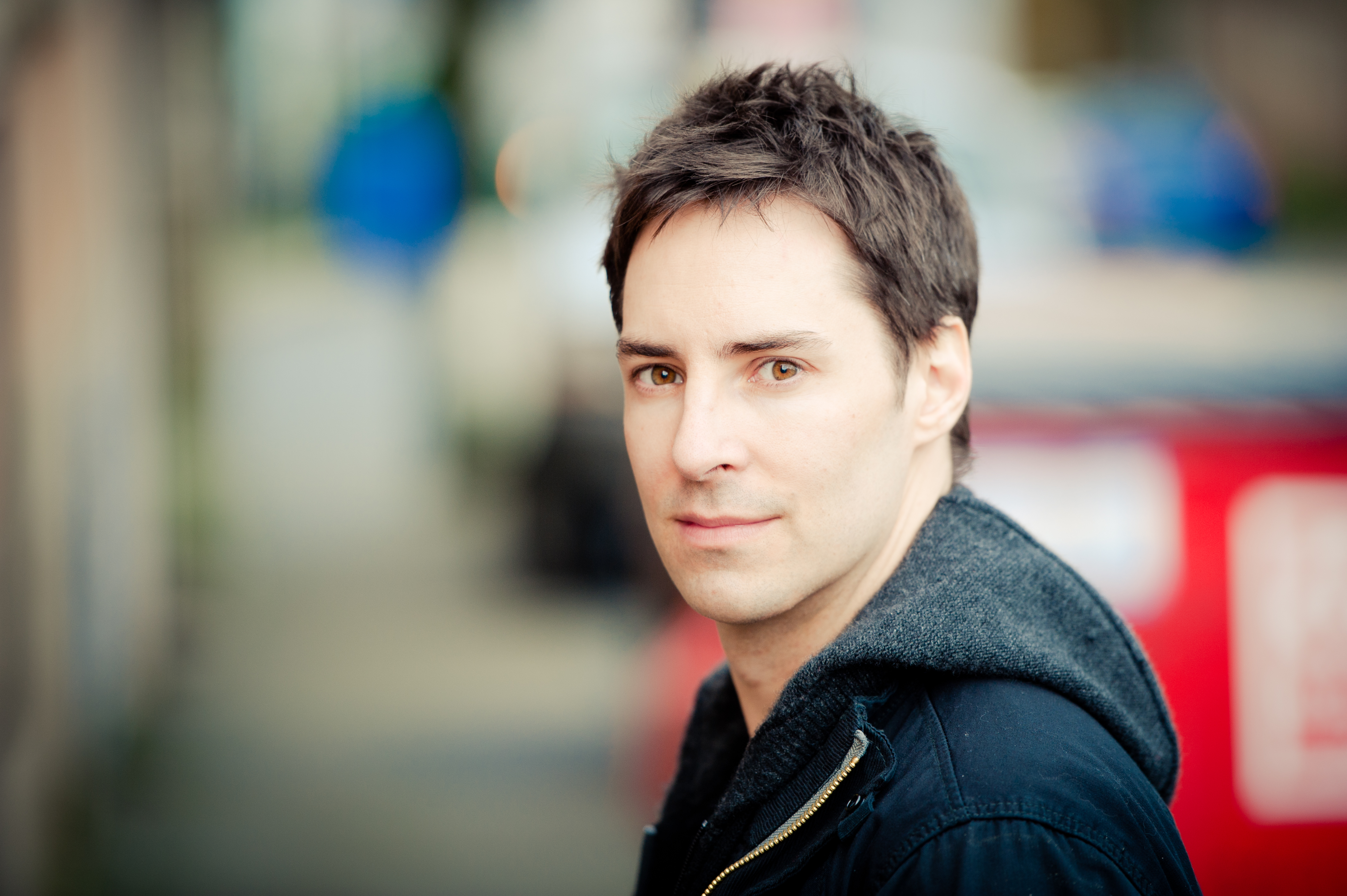
Almost all songs featured in the Equestria Girls animated media were composed by Daniel Ingram.

My Little Pony: Equestria Girls (or simply Equestria Girls) is an animated spin-off franchise based on the children's television series My Little Pony: Friendship Is Magic, which in turn is based on the My Little Pony toyline created by American toy and game manufacturer Hasbro. Much like Friendship Is Magic, the franchise also has musical elements, featuring songs performed onscreen by its characters in the films and other media.

Overall, as of 2019, the spin-off franchise has featured over 50 original songs.

== Featured songs ==
=== Feature films ===
==== Equestria Girls (2013) ====
#	Title	Music	Lyrics	Performer (character)^{1}	Backing vocals	Context
1	"Friendship Is Magic" (Remix)	Daniel Ingram	Lauren Faust	Rebecca Shoichet (Twilight Sparkle)	-	Opening credits; remix version of the series' main theme.
2	"This Strange World"	Daniel Ingram	Daniel Ingram	Rebecca Shoichet (Twilight Sparkle)	-	Having arrived in the human world, Twilight wonders what this strange new world is.
3	"Equestria Girls" (Cafeteria Song)	Daniel Ingram	Daniel Ingram, Meghan McCarthy	Shannon Chan-Kent (Pinkie Pie), Kazumi Evans (Rarity), Ashleigh Ball (Applejack, Rainbow Dash), Andrea Libman (Fluttershy), Shoichet (Twilight Sparkle)	-	Twilight and her new friends sing to create unity between the students and boost Twilight's popularity so she can recover her magical crown. (Note: only song of the movie performed on-screen by the characters)
4	"Time to Come Together"	Daniel Ingram	Daniel Ingram, Meghan McCarthy	Shoichet (Twilight Sparkle)	Ball (Applejack, Rainbow Dash), Chan-Kent (Pinkie Pie), Evans (Rarity), Libman (Fluttershy)	The newly united human Mane Six clean and redecorate the school auditorium; soon, the entire school gathers to help them.
5	"This Is Our Big Night"	Daniel Ingram	Daniel Ingram, Meghan McCarthy	Shoichet (Twilight Sparkle), Ball (Applejack, Rainbow Dash), Chan-Kent (Pinkie Pie), Evans (Rarity), Libman (Fluttershy)^{4}		The Mane Six get dressed for the Fall Formal party; during a reprise, they enjoy the party.
6	"A Friend for Life"	Daniel Ingram	Daniel Ingram	Jerrica Santos^{3}	-	Ending credits.

^{1}In the case of several characters providing lead vocals, the performers are listed in the order in which their characters (of the first of their characters in case they voice several) start singing.
^{3}The singer is not portraying a character.
^{4}As the song only features several characters singing in harmony, there are no lead vocals per se.

==== Rainbow Rocks (2014) ====
#	Title	Music	Lyrics	Performer (character)^{1}	Backing vocals	Context
1	"Rainbow Rocks"	Daniel Ingram	Daniel Ingram	Ball (Rainbow Dash, Applejack), Chan-Kent (Pinkie Pie), Shoichet (Twilight Sparkle)	Evans (Rarity), Libman (Fluttershy)	Opening credits.
2	"Better Than Ever"	Daniel Ingram	Daniel Ingram, Meghan McCarthy	Ball (Rainbow Dash, Applejack), Chan-Kent (Pinkie Pie)	Evans (Rarity), Libman (Fluttershy)	The Rainbooms, composed of Rainbow Dash, Applejack, Pinkie Pie, Rarity, and Fluttershy, perform a song during a rehearsal about how life at Canterlot High School has improved.
3	"Battle"	Daniel Ingram	Daniel Ingram, Meghan McCarthy	Evans (Adagio Dazzle)	Shylo Sharity (Aria Blaze), Madeline Merlo (Sonata Dusk), Eva Tavares, Paula Berry, David Mongar (background characters), Canterlot High students	The Dazzlings use their magic to charm the students of Canterlot High, turning them against each other and convincing them to compete in a Battle of the Bands so they can feed on their energy.
4	"Bad Counter Spell"	Daniel Ingram	Meghan McCarthy	Shoichet (Twilight Sparkle)	-	The Rainbooms, now with Twilight, are rehearsing a song they hope to use to break the Dazzlings' spell on Canterlot High. However, Twilight's lyrics are approximative and she sings off-key, distracting the rest of the band.
5	"Shake Your Tail"	Daniel Ingram	Amy Keating Rogers, Daniel Ingram	Shoichet (Twilight Sparkle), Chan-Kent (Pinkie Pie), Evans (Rarity), Ball (Applejack)	Ball (Rainbow Dash), Libman (Fluttershy)	The Rainbooms perform in the first round of the Battle of the Bands. The song turns into a near-complete disaster when the other competitors sabotage their performance. This song is also featured in the animated short of the same name released before the movie, in which the Rainbooms try to think of a theme for a school dance. They eventually decide to combine the several themes they proposed for the dance, in which they perform the song.
6	"Under Our Spell"	Daniel Ingram	Meghan McCarthy	Evans (Adagio Dazzle)	Sharity (Aria Blaze), Merlo (Sonata Dusk)	The Dazzlings perform in the first round of the Battle of the Bands; Canterlot High still doesn't realize that they use their songs to hypnotize and feed on them. During the rest of the song, a montage of the Battle of the Bands is shown.
7	"Tricks Up My Sleeve"	Daniel Ingram	Daniel Ingram, Meghan McCarthy	Kathleen Barr (Trixie)	Kaylee Johnston (Trixie's bandmates)	Trixie and the Illusions perform in the semifinals of the Battle of the Bands. Only a small part of the song is heard in the movie, but the soundtrack features the full version.
8	"Awesome As I Wanna Be"	Daniel Ingram	Daniel Ingram, Meghan McCarthy	Ball (Rainbow Dash)	Shoichet (Twilight Sparkle), Ball (Applejack), Chan-Kent (Pinkie Pie), Evans (Rarity), Libman (Fluttershy)	The Rainbooms perform in the semifinals of the Battle of the Bands; as Sunset Shimmer notices that Dash is about to fully transform in front of the Dazzlings, she interrupts the song in the middle of it.
9	"Welcome to the Show"^{7}	Daniel Ingram	Daniel Ingram, Meghan McCarthy	Evans (Adagio Dazzle), Shoichet (Twilight Sparkle, Sunset Shimmer)	Sharity (Aria Blaze), Merlo (Sonata Dusk), Ball (Rainbow Dash, Applejack), Chan-Kent (Pinkie Pie), Evans (Rarity), Libman (Fluttershy), choir (Canterlot High students)	Consists of two songs interrupting each other regularly, one by the Dazzlings during the finale of the Battle of the Bands, as they try to suck all of the energy left in Canterlot High, and one by the Rainbooms who try to break their spell with their music. As the Rainbooms are nearly defeated, Sunset Shimmer joins them; together, they rally the school to their side and break the spell.
10	"Shine Like Rainbows"	Daniel Ingram	Daniel Ingram	Ball (Applejack, Rainbow Dash), Evans (Rarity), Shoichet (Sunset Shimmer)	Shoichet (Twilight Sparkle), Chan-Kent (Pinkie Pie), Libman (Fluttershy), rest of the cast	The Rainbooms rehearse this song during the ending credits.

^{1}In the case of several characters providing lead vocals, the performers are listed in the order in which their characters (of the first of their characters in case they voice several) start singing.
7 This song starts before "Rainbooms Battle", and continues after it; the two are performed as one song but are credited as two separate songs.

==== Friendship Games (2015) ====
#	Title	Music	Lyrics	Performer (character)^{1}	Backing vocals	Context
1	"Friendship Games"	Daniel Ingram	Daniel Ingram	Ball (Rainbow Dash, Applejack), Shoichet (Sunset Shimmer)	Chan-Kent (Pinkie Pie), Evans (Rarity), Libman (Fluttershy), Kaylee Johnston, Gabriel C. Brown, and Company (Canterlot High)	Opening credits.
2	"CHS Rally"	Daniel Ingram	Josh Haber, Daniel Ingram	Ball (Rainbow Dash)	Johnston (Brass band leader), Brown, and Company (Canterlot High)	Rainbow Dash leads a pep rally to motivate the Canterlot High students for the upcoming Friendship Games.
3	"What More Is Out There?"	Daniel Ingram	Josh Haber, Daniel Ingram	Shoichet (Twilight Sparkle)	-	The human counterpart of Twilight Sparkle laments that she feels trapped at Crystal Prep Academy and cannot find somewhere she belongs.
4	"ACADECA"	Daniel Ingram	Josh Haber, Daniel Ingram	Shoichet (Twilight Sparkle, Sunset Shimmer)	Johnston, Brown, and Company (Canterlot High and Crystal Prep Academy)	Canterlot High School and Crystal Prep Academy face each other in several trials. (Note: "ACADECA" stands for "Academic Decathlon")
5	"Unleash the Magic"	Daniel Ingram	Josh Haber, Daniel Ingram	Iris Quinn (Principal Cinch), Shoichet (Twilight Sparkle)	Johnston, Brown, and Company (Crystal Prep Academy)	Principal Cinch and the students of Crystal Prep Academy pressure Twilight into releasing the magic she collected in her pendant and using it to win the Friendship Games.
6	"Right There in Front of Me"	Daniel Ingram	Daniel Ingram	Shoichet (Twilight Sparkle, Sunset Shimmer)	Ball (Rainbow Dash, Applejack), Chan-Kent (Pinkie Pie), Evans (Rarity), Libman (Fluttershy)	Ending credits.

^{1}In the case of several characters providing lead vocals, the performers are listed in the order in which their characters (of the first of their characters in case they voice several) start singing.

==== Legend of Everfree (2016) ====
#	Title	Music	Lyrics	Performer (character)^{1}	Backing vocals	Context
1	"The Legend of Everfree"	Daniel Ingram	Kristine Songco, Joanna Lewis, Daniel Ingram	Shoichet (Twilight Sparkle, Sunset Shimmer), Ball (Rainbow Dash, Applejack), Chan-Kent (Pinkie Pie), Evans (Rarity), Libman (Fluttershy), Ensemble^{4}		Opening credits.
2	"The Midnight in Me"	Daniel Ingram	Kristine Songco, Joanna Lewis, Daniel Ingram	Shoichet (Twilight Sparkle)	-	Twilight despairs as she fears the evil Midnight Sparkle is still inside of her.
3	"Embrace the Magic"	Daniel Ingram	Kristine Songco, Joanna Lewis	Shoichet (Sunset Shimmer)	-	Sunset convinces her friends to embrace their new powers instead of fearing them.
4	"We Will Stand for Everfree"	Daniel Ingram	Kristine Songco, Joanna Lewis	Kelly Metzger (Gloriosa Daisy)	-	Gloriosa, transformed by Equestrian magic, decides to keep Camp Everfree permanently open, even if it means keeping the Canterlot High students trapped inside.
5	"Legend You Were Meant To Be"	Daniel Ingram	Kristine Songco, Joanna Lewis, Daniel Ingram	Shoichet (Twilight Sparkle, Sunset Shimmer), Libman (Fluttershy), Ball (Rainbow Dash, Applejack), Evans (Rarity)	Chan-Kent (Pinkie Pie)	The Rainbooms, now including the human world Twilight Sparkle, perform this song at the Crystal ball fundraiser to save Camp Everfree from bankruptcy, interspersed with scenes of them preparing for the fundraiser with the other campers.
6	"Hope Shines Eternal"	Daniel Ingram	Daniel Ingram	Shoichet (Sunset Shimmer, Twilight Sparkle), Evans (Rarity), Ball (Applejack, Rainbow Dash), Libman (Fluttershy), Chan-Kent (Pinkie Pie)	-	Ending credits.

^{1}In the case of several characters providing lead vocals, the performers are listed in the order in which their characters (of the first of their characters in case they voice several) start singing.
^{4}As the song only features several characters singing in harmony, there are no lead vocals.

=== Specials ===
==== Dance Magic (2017) ====
Title	Music	Lyrics	Performer (character)^{1}	Backing vocals	Context
"Dance Magic"	Daniel Ingram	G.M. Berrow, Daniel Ingram	Shoichet (Sunset Shimmer, Twilight Sparkle) and Libman (Pinkie Pie)	Ball (Rainbow Dash, Applejack), Evans (Rarity), Chan-Kent (Pinkie Pie), and Libman (Fluttershy)	The Crystal Rainbooms' (composed of the Rainbooms' regular members along with Sunny Flare, Sour Sweet, Sugarcoat, and Lemon Zest) entry for the Chance to Prance music video competition.

==== Forgotten Friendship (2018) ====
#	Title	Music	Lyrics	Performer (character)	Backing vocals	Context
1	"We've Come So Far"	Daniel Ingram, Trevor Hoffmann	Nick Confalone	Shoichet (Sunset Shimmer)	Shoichet (Twilight Sparkle), Evans (Rarity), Ball (Applejack, Rainbow Dash), Libman (Fluttershy), and Chan-Kent (Pinkie Pie)	Sunset Shimmer sings about the friendships she has made since reforming while working on the school yearbook with the Equestria Girls.
2	"Invisible"	John Jennings Boyd, Lisette Bustamante	Nick Confalone	Chan-Kent (Wallflower Blush)	-	Wallflower Blush sings about her high school experiences as a shy and ignored loner.

==== Rollercoaster of Friendship (2018) ====
Title	Music	Lyrics	Performer (character)	Backing vocals	Context
"Photo Booth"	John Jennings Boyd, Lisette Bustamante	Nick Confalone, John Jennings Boyd	Ball (Applejack), Evans (Rarity)	Shoichet (Sunset Shimmer, Twilight Sparkle), Libman (Fluttershy, Pinkie Pie), and Ball (Rainbow Dash)	The Rainbooms perform as the centerpiece for the Equestria Land theme park's light parade, interspersed with scenes of them enjoying the park.

==== Spring Breakdown (2019) ====
Title	Music	Lyrics	Performer (character)	Backing vocals	Context
"All Good"	Jessica Charlotte Vaughn, Jess Furman, Ethan Roberts		Ball (Rainbow Dash), and Shoichet (Twilight Sparkle, Sunset Shimmer)	Evans (Rarity), and Libman (Pinkie Pie, Fluttershy)	The Rainbooms perform this song during a spring break cruise, but their concert is cut short when Rainbow Dash transforms and the ship experiences a power failure.

==== Sunset's Backstage Pass (2019) ====
Title	Music	Lyrics	Performer (character)	Backing vocals	Context
"True Original"	Jessica Charlotte Vaughn, Jess Furman, and her0ism		Marie Hui (Kiwi Lollipop), Arielle Truliao (Supernova Zap), Shoichet (Sunset Shimmer), and Chan-Kent (Pinkie Pie)	-	Pinkie Pie and Sunset Shimmer perform this song with Kiwi Lollipop (K-Lo) and Supernova Zap (Su-Z) during the first night of the Starswirl Music Festival.

=== Equestria Girls music videos (2017) ===
#	Title	Music	Lyrics	Performer (character)	Backing vocals	Context
1	"Mad Twience"	John Boyd	John Boyd	Shoichet (Twilight Sparkle)	-	Twilight Sparkle builds an android mate for Spike.
2	"Monday Blues"	John Boyd	John Boyd	Shoichet (Sunset Shimmer, Twilight Sparkle)	-	Sunset Shimmer and Twilight Sparkle walk to school in the pouring rain through a series of parallel frustrations.
3	"Shake Things Up!"	Mason Rather	Mason Rather	Ball (Applejack)	-	Applejack mixes new, original drinks while working at a juice bar at the Canterlot Mall.
4	"Get the Show on the Road"	Bill Sherman	Chris Jackson	Shoichet (Sunset Shimmer, Twilight Sparkle), Ball (Rainbow Dash, Applejack), Evans (Rarity), Libman (Fluttershy), and Chan-Kent (Pinkie Pie)	-	The Rainbooms use their geode powers to restore an old school bus to go on tour.
5	"Coinky-Dink World"	Mason Rather	Mason Rather	Chan-Kent (Pinkie Pie)	-	Pinkie Pie works as a cafe waitress and tries to play a matchmaker between two patrons.
6	"Good Vibes"	Daniel Ingram	Daniel Ingram	Shoichet (Sunset Shimmer, Twilight Sparkle), Ball (Rainbow Dash, Applejack), Evans (Rarity), Libman (Fluttershy), and Chan-Kent (Pinkie Pie)	-	The Equestria Girls and other characters pay forward a string of good deeds to each other at the Canterlot Mall.

=== Web series ===
==== Season 1 (2017-18) ====
#	Title	Short	Music	Lyrics	Performer (character)	Backing vocals	Context
1	"Rise Up!"	"The Finals Countdown"	Daniel Ingram	Daniel Ingram, Gillian Berrow	Shoichet (Twilight Sparkle)	Shoichet (Sunset Shimmer), Ball (Applejack, Rainbow Dash), Evans (Rarity), Libman (Fluttershy), and Chan-Kent (Pinkie Pie)	Twilight Sparkle helps her friends study for their upcoming final exams.
2	"Room to Grow"	"My Little Shop of Horrors"	Daniel Ingram	Daniel Ingram	Shoichet (Twilight Sparkle)	-	Twilight Sparkle waters Principal Celestia's garden.
3	"5 to 9"		Mason Rather	Gillian Berrow	Ball (Applejack)	-	Applejack does her farmhouse chores and performs at a party in her barn.
4	"So Much More to Me"		Mason Rather	Kate Leth	Libman (Fluttershy)	-	Fluttershy sings to the animals at the animal shelter after declining to go to a karaoke party with her friends.
5	"The Other Side"		John Jennings Boyd, Lisette Bustamante		Evans (Rarity)	-	Rarity overcomes her creative block designing outfits.

==== Season 2 (2019-20) ====
The show's second season is expected to have "ten original songs and six music videos."

#	Title	Short	Music	Lyrics	Performer (character)	Backing vocals	Context
1	"I'm on a Yacht"		John Boyd and Lisette Bustamante		Shoichet (Sunset Shimmer), Evans (Rarity), Ball (Rainbow Dash, Applejack), and Libman (Fluttershy, Pinkie Pie)	Shoichet (Twilight Sparkle)	The Equestria Girls perform a music video parody of The Lonely Island's and T-Pain's "I'm on a Boat" while on the Luxe Deluxe cruise ship for spring break.
2	"Run to Break Free"		Jess Furman, Jessica Vaughn, and Dan Whittemore		Ball (Rainbow Dash)	-	Rainbow Dash sings about constantly living life in slow motion.
3	"Find the Magic"		Jarl Aanestad, Jess Furman, and Jessica Vaughn		Evans (Adagio Dazzle), Sharity (Aria Blaze), and Chan-Kent (Sonata Dusk)	-	The Dazzlings perform this song at the Starswirled Music Festival.
4	"Let It Rain"		John Boyd, Jess Furman, and Jessica Vaughn		Shoichet (Sunset Shimmer)	-	Sunset Shimmer performs this song on the Starswirled Music Festival stage during a rainstorm.
5	"Cheer You On"		John Boyd, Jess Furman, and Jessica Vaughn		Vincent Tong (Flash Sentry)	-	Flash Sentry and his band perform this song in the school gymnasium when Micro Chips' out-of-control robot JVJ-24601 goes on a rampage. Flash helps the Equestria Girls as they use their powers to defeat it while continuing to perform the song which praises them in its lyrics.

== Other ==
#	Title	Music	Lyrics	Performer (character)^{1}	Backing vocals	Context
1	"My Little Pony Friends"	Daniel Ingram	Lauren Faust, Daniel Ingram	Kaylee Johnston^{3}	AJ Woodworth,^{3} Laura Hastings^{3}	Original ending credits song for Equestria Girls, replaced by "A Friend for Life"; featured in a music video of the same name, published on Hasbro's YouTube channel on August 14, 2014.
2	"Perfect Day for Fun"	Daniel Ingram	Amy Keating Rogers, Daniel Ingram	Shoichet (Twilight Sparkle), Ball (Rainbow Dash, Applejack), Evans (Rarity), Libman (Fluttershy), Chan-Kent (Pinkie Pie)	-	The Rainbooms spend time together at a carnival; featured in the music video "Perfect Day for Fun!" on June 19, 2014.
3	"Friendship Through the Ages"	Daniel Ingram	Daniel Ingram	Shoichet (Twilight Sparkle), Libman (Fluttershy), Evans (Rarity), Ball (Rainbow Dash, Applejack), Chan-Kent (Pinkie Pie)	Shoichet (Sunset Shimmer)	The Rainbooms sing about their everlasting friendship with Sunset Shimmer; featured in the self-titled music video on April 2, 2015.
4	"My Past Is Not Today"	Daniel Ingram	Daniel Ingram	Shoichet (Sunset Shimmer)	-	Sunset Shimmer disavows her former life as the bully of Canterlot High School; featured in the self-titled music video on April 2, 2015.
5	"Life Is a Runway"	Daniel Ingram	Daniel Ingram	Evans (Rarity)	Johnston^{3}	Rarity proclaims her philosophy about empowerment through fashion; featured in the self-titled music video on April 2, 2015.
6	"Equestria Girls Forever"	Jessica Charlotte Vaughn, Jess Furman, Dan Whittemore		Sophia Montero^{3}	-	A promotional song for the YouTube web series "Equestria Girls: Better Together"; was featured in the music video of the same name on November 24, 2017.

^{1}In the case of several characters providing lead vocals, the performers are listed in the order in which their characters (of the first of their characters in case they voice several) start singing.
^{3}The singer is not portraying a character.

== Discography ==
=== Soundtrack albums ===
Title	Details	Peak chart positions	
Title	Details	US Soundtracks	US Kids
My Little Pony Equestria Girls - Original Motion Picture Soundtrack	Released: September 23, 2014; Label: Hasbro Studios; Formats: digital download, streaming	—	15
My Little Pony Equestria Girls: Rainbow Rocks - Original Motion Picture Soundtrack	Released: September 10, 2014; Label: Hasbro Studios; Formats: digital download, streaming	—	8
My Little Pony Equestria Girls: Friendship Games - Original Motion Picture Soundtrack	Released: September 18, 2015; Label: Hasbro Studios, Sony Music Entertainment; Formats: digital download, streaming	22	12
My Little Pony Equestria Girls: Legend of Everfree - Original Motion Picture Soundtrack	Released: September 16, 2016; Label: Hasbro Studios, Sony Music Entertainment; Formats: digital download, streaming	25	—

=== Compilation albums ===
Title	Details
My Little Pony - Equestria Girls Collection	Released: April 22, 2016; Label: Hasbro Studios; Formats: digital download
