= Snö =

Single by Laleh

from the album Me and Simon
- Released: 19 December 2007
- Recorded: 2007
- Genre: Pop
- Length: 4:30 (Main/Soundtrack Version); 4:19 (Edit/Album Version)
- Label: Warner Music Sweden
- Songwriter: Laleh Pourkarim
- Producer: Laleh Pourkarim

Laleh singles chronology
"Closer" (2007)	"Snö" (2007)	"Simon Says" (2009)

"Snö" ("Snow") is a song by Iranian-Swedish singer-songwriter Laleh recorded with the London Symphony Orchestra for the film Arn - The Knight Templar. It was released on 19 December 2007 as her ninth single and was later included on her third studio album, Me and Simon. The song peaked at No. 14 on the Swedish Singles Chart.

== Track listing ==
1. "Snö" – 4:19

== Charts ==
Chart (2008)	Peak position
Swedish Singles Chart	14
