= Vem tänder stjärnorna? =

Single by Eva Dahlgren

from the album En blekt blondins hjärta
- Songwriter: Eva Dahlgren

"Vem tänder stjärnorna?" is a single released by Swedish singer Eva Dahlgren from her 1991 album En blekt blondins hjärta.

The song won a Grammis for Song of the Year.

== Music video ==
The music video shows images of Eva Dahlgren and Stellan Skarsgård by the water.

== Other versions ==
The English version, also performed by Dahlgren, is "I'm Not in Love with You".

== Charts ==
Chart (1991–1992)	Peak position
Sweden (Sverigetopplistan)	4
