= Welcome to the Show (Adam Lambert song) =

Single by Adam Lambert featuring Laleh
- Released: March 17, 2016
- Recorded: New York City, New York
- Genre: Power pop
- Length: 3:21
- Label: Warner Bros.
- Songwriters: Ali Payami; Laleh Pourkarim
- Producer: Laleh Pourkarim

Adam Lambert singles chronology
"Another Lonely Night" (2015)	"Welcome to the Show" (2016)	"Two Fux" (2017)

Laleh singles chronology
"Sol, vind och vatten" (2015)	"Welcome to the Show" (2016)	"Bara få va mig själv" (2016)

Music video
- "Welcome to the Show" on YouTube

"Welcome to the Show" is a song recorded by American singer Adam Lambert featuring Persian-Swedish singer-songwriter Laleh. It was released through Warner Bros. Records on March 17, 2016 as a standalone single. The power pop song was written by Laleh with Ali Payami and was produced by Laleh.

Lambert and Laleh promoted the song through a performance on American Idol, the eighth season of which he finished as runner-up, on March 17, 2016. An accompanying music video co-directed by Lambert and photographer Lee Cherry premiered July 6, 2016 alongside an essay from Lambert explaining the song's intention to "inspire strength and PRIDE."

== Composition ==
"[This song] is an anthem about facing exactly who you are and OWNING it. Its [sic] intended as a mantra to inspire strength and PRIDE."

- Adam Lambert in an essay accompanying the song's music video.

"Welcome to the Show" is a power ballad written by Ali Payami and Laleh Pourkarim with a duration of three minutes and twenty-one seconds (3:21). Payami also provides the instrumentation for the song and is credited with performances on bass, keyboards, percussion, piano, and strings. Max Martin, a long-time collaborator of Lambert's and the executive producer of his 2015 album, The Original High, introduced Lambert to Laleh and Payami. Lyrically, the song discusses "shin[ing] a light" on one's vulnerabilities and embracing one's honest self.

According to the digital sheet music published by Kobalt Music Publishing America, the song is originally composed in the key of D♭ major and is set in common time to an approximate tempo of 108 BPM. Lambert's vocals span two-and-a-half octaves from B♭_{3} through E♭_{6}. Described as a power ballad, the song features synth chords and a "boom-clap" beat paired with introspective, vulnerable lyrics.

== Music video ==
The official music video for "Welcome to the Show" premiered July 6, 2016 and was co-directed by Adam Lambert with his friend, photographer Lee Cherry. Dedicated to his fans, the video was produced independently of Lambert's record label. Shot primarily in black-and-white, the video features kaleidoscopic colour to accentuate emotional moments. The close-up shots and shirtless moments have also been described as expressions of vulnerability. Accompanying the release of the video, Lambert published an essay describing the origin of the song and the video's concept, wherein he explains that he has seen "so many people trapped by the identity they put so much effort into maintaining, or shunned by choosing not to," and that "Welcome to the Show" is all about choosing to "accept and love who YOU are." Released three weeks after the Orlando nightclub shooting, the video also serves as an indirect tribute to the shooting victims and LGBT community as a whole.

== Chart performance ==
Chart performance for "Welcome to the Show"
Chart (2016)	Peak position
Finland Download (Latauslista)	1
Hungary (Single Top 40)	20
Sweden Heatseeker (Sverigetopplistan)	2
US Pop Digital Songs (Billboard)	29
