= Laleh (singer) =

Swedish singer (born 1982)

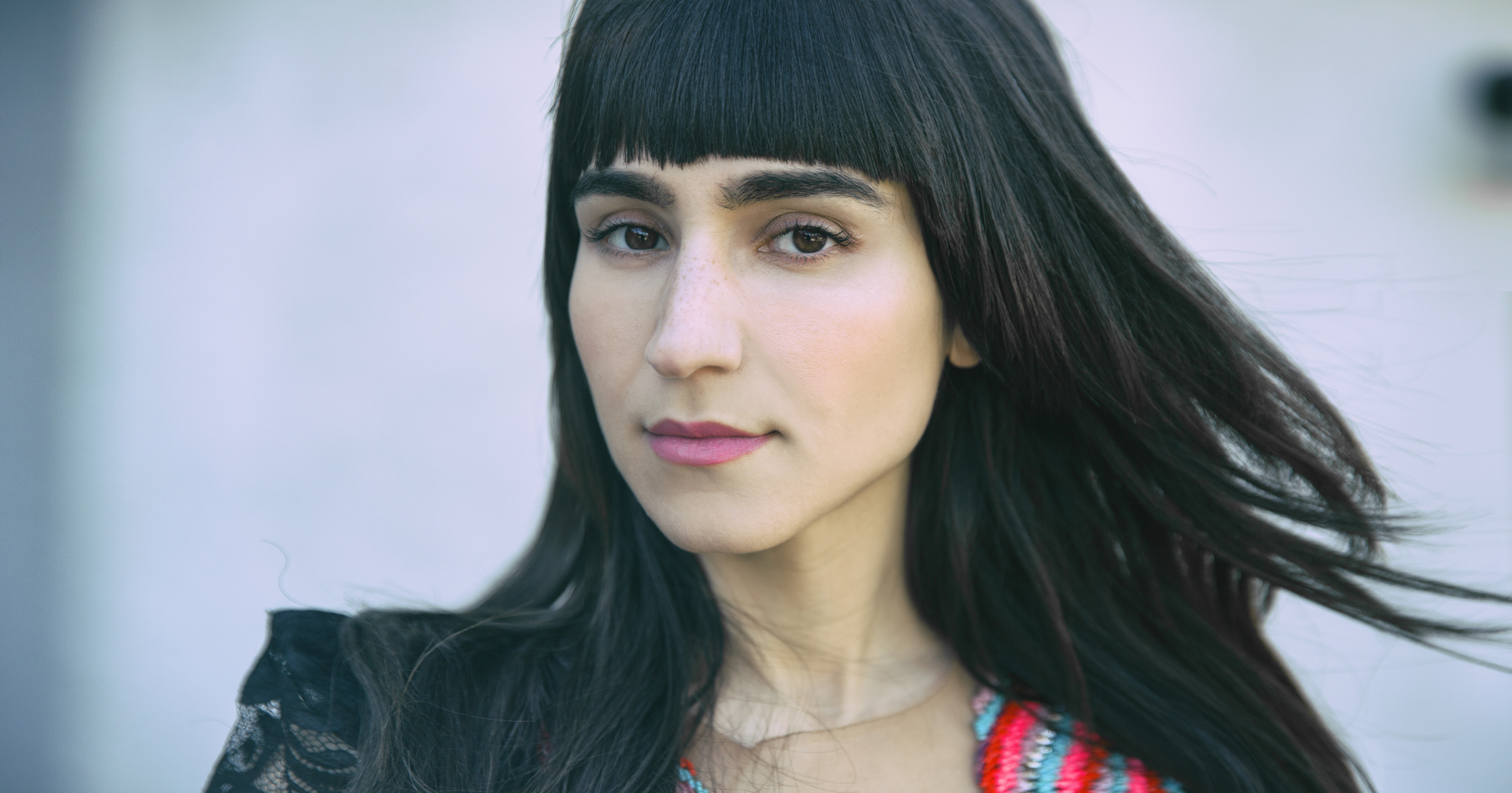
- Laleh in 2016

Background information
- Born: Laleh Pourkarim; 10 June 1982 (age 44); Bandar-e Anzali, Gilan, Iran
- Origin: Hammarkullen, Gothenburg, Sweden
- Genres: Pop; folk
- Occupations: Singer; songwriter; record producer; guitarist; pianist; record company manager
- Instruments: Vocals; guitar; piano; keyboards; saxophone; drums
- Years active: 2000–2006 (actress); 2003–present (singer)
- Labels: Warner Music Sweden; Island; Universal Music Sweden
- Website: laleh.se

Laleh Pourkarim (Persian: لاله پورکریم, IPA: [lɒːˈle puːɾkæˈɾiːm]; born 10 June 1982), known mononymously as Laleh (Swedish: [ˈlɑ̌ːlɛ]), is an Iranian-born Swedish singer-songwriter, record producer, guitarist, pianist, and record company manager. Following a short acting career, she entered the music industry in 2005 with her self-titled debut album, which peaked at number one in Sweden and went on to become that country's highest-selling album of the year.

She has since released eight further studio albums. She has sung in both English and Swedish, in addition to her parents' native tongue, Persian. In 2011, she participated in the Swedish television show Så mycket bättre, which sees a number of artists create new interpretations of the others' songs. Her performances on the show were lauded by both critics and the public. Following the show, it was noted in the media that she had been given "a second breakthrough".

Her 2012 album, Sjung, yielded the international hit "Some Die Young", which became closely associated as a song of remembrance in the aftermath of the 2011 Norwegian attacks, and was certified 14 times platinum in Norway, double platinum in Sweden and provided Laleh her second chart-hit in Denmark and first in Austria, Finland and Germany. Colors, was released across Scandinavia in October 2013. She signed an international deal with Island Records in January 2014, leading to the release of the Boom EP and a number of songwriting and production credits for artists including Shawn Mendes, Adam Lambert, Demi Lovato, and Ellie Goulding. In 2016 she released the album Kristaller and in 2019 the album Vänta!. Her most recent album, 2022's Vatten, was her first release in conjunction with Universal Music Sweden.

== Background and personal life ==
Laleh was born in the Northern Iranian harbour town of Bandar-e Anzali. She fled the country in 1983 with her parents to live in Azerbaijan, and later moving on to Minsk, Belarus and a refugee camp in Tidaholm, Sweden. Laleh (لاله) is the Persian word for tulip, a popular girl's name as well a common symbol in Iranian culture. She moved to Sweden when she was eight (she has dual citizenship), and in her teenage years moved to Gothenburg to attend school in the multicultural district of Angered.

At Hvitfeldtska High School she was enrolled in the music program, growing up with classical music, ballet and circus music. She was later interested in punk, reggae and jazz music. She also learned to play guitar, and as a teenager formed a jazz ensemble with her music teacher named Bejola. She went on to teach herself to play percussion and saxophone.

She is the daughter of Houshang Pourkarim, who died in 1994. An opponent of the Islamic regime in Tehran, he was an artist, journalist and prominent Iranian ethnologist and rural sociologist from Bandar-e Anzali. During her appearance on Så mycket bättre, she discussed her tough childhood, moving from country to country, and how she witnessed her father's death. At a summer camp in 1994, he tried to rescue a woman who had fallen from her canoe into the water. As Houshang paddled out to help her, the canoe overturned. The woman survived but Laleh's father drowned. Laleh's mother, Atefe, was a refugee from Georgia via Azerbaijan before she went to Iran to study comparative literature at the University of Tehran. Once the family arrived in Sweden, Laleh learned Swedish in eleven days, according to a media account of her biography.

Beginning her career in acting, she had a major role in the Swedish movie Jalla! Jalla!, directed by Josef Fares, which was a big success at the Swedish box office in 2000. Laleh moved to Stockholm in 2010 after living in Skellefteå for two years. Until 2011 she was known for her reluctance to give interviews, but more recently she has been more accessible to the media, including appearing on talk shows and other TV programs, a move that has benefited her career.

== Music career ==
=== 2003–2005: Early career and Laleh ===
Laleh began her music career in 2003. She founded her own production and publishing company 'Lost Army' and signed a recording and distribution contract with Warner Music Sweden before recording her first studio album. The sound of her early songs have been compared to adult contemporary artists such as Sting and Seal. She wrote, performed, and produced her self-titled debut, which was released in the spring of 2005 and saw a percentage of the proceeds go to charity. It became the highest selling album of the year with a recorded seventy-one weeks in the top sixty and reached number one on the Swedish chart. Critical praise was heaped on the album upon its release, although some noted that the album was too sprawling and genre-hopping. The first single from the album was "Invisible (My Song)", which peaked at number seven in Sweden in February 2012. Follow-up "Storebror" failed to chart, but next single, "Live Tomorrow" had even greater success than "Invisible" and ended up at the top of Sveriges Radio P3's radio show "Tracks" (Trackslistan) for several weeks. It peaked at number twenty on the Sverigetopplistan and also charted in Denmark. During 2005 she won numerous awards, including at the Swedish Grammis, where she received seven nominations and picked up three wins, including Artist of the Year, Producer of the Year, and New Artist of the Year. She was also nominated four times at the 2006 P3 Guld Awards and won Newcomer of the Year and Best Female Artist.

=== 2006–2010: Prinsessor and Me and Simon ===
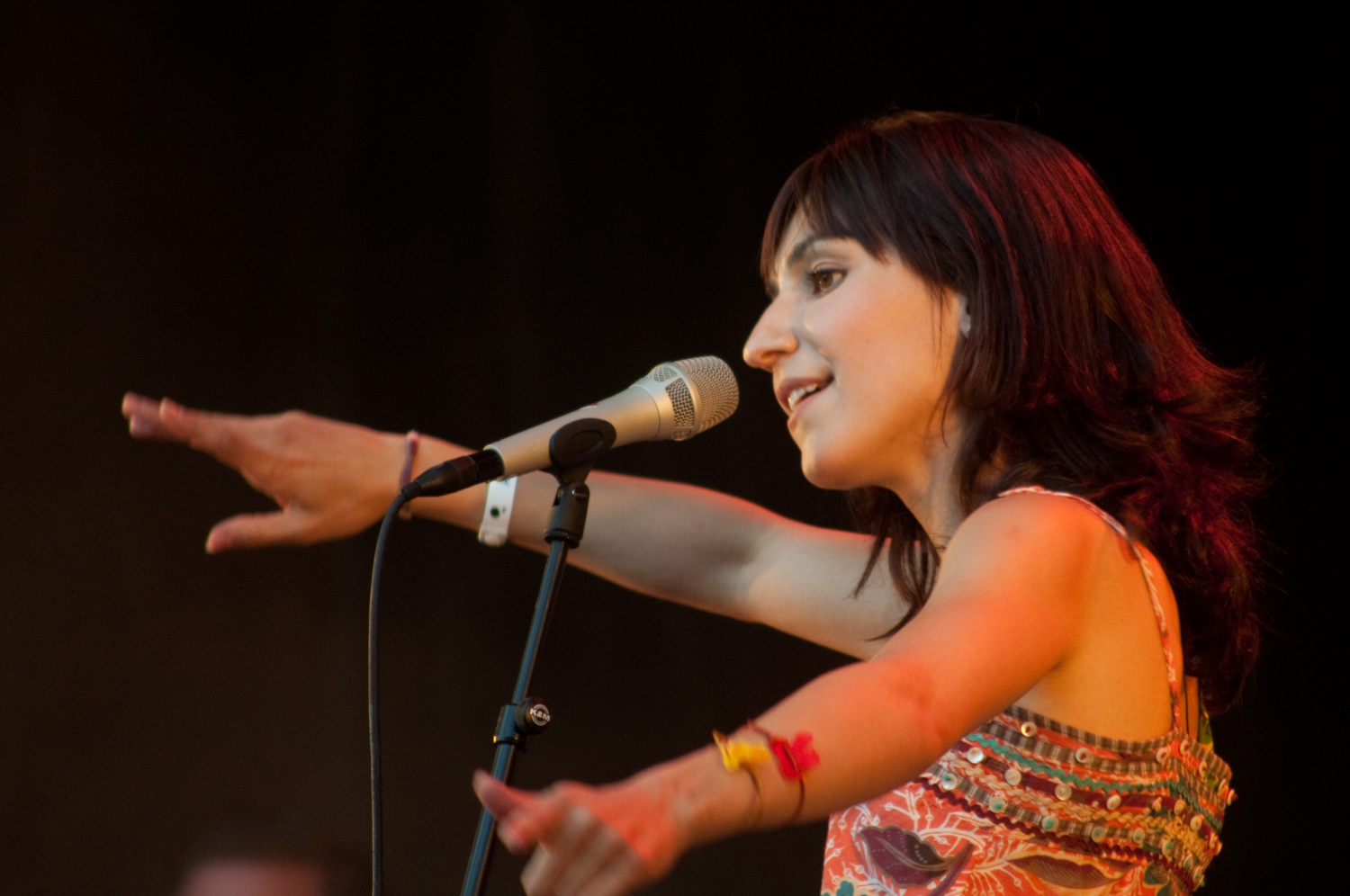
Laleh on stage in June 2009

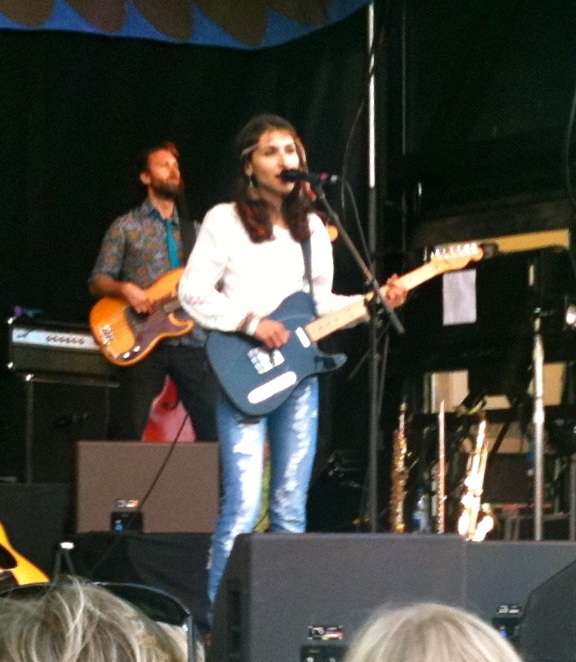
Laleh performing at Landskrona in 2010

In 2006, Prinsessor ("Princesses") was released and peaked at number three on the Swedish album chart. The album stayed on the chart for twenty-nine weeks, but failed to yield any charting singles, despite four releases. Unlike its predecessor which won numerous awards, Prinsessor, was met with mixed reviews from Swedish critics, who saw the album as far too sprawling and sensed a loss of her "uniqueness".

After taking a break, Laleh returned to release her third studio album in 2009, Me and Simon. It contained a more folk pop sound than previous rock or soul-tinged tracks which has been attributed to the surroundings of moving from a big city to the northern Swedish town of Skellefteå in 2006. One of the nature reserves in the town was her inspiration for "Bjurö klubb". It was met with mixed to positive reviews by Swedish critics. The first single released from the album "Simon Says" peaked at number forty-one on the Swedish Singles Chart. Due to strong downloads from the album, the first track from the LP, "Big City Love", also charted at number thirty-two. It was later released as a single in May 2009 but failed to return to the chart. Two further releases, "Bjurö klubb" and "Mysteries" failed to chart at the time.

During these years, Laleh toured in several Scandinavian countries, Britain and Germany but has previously hinted that she is hesitant to launch overseas, saying she wants to be more prepared and develop fully as an artist.

=== 2011–2012: Så mycket bättre and Sjung ===
In 2011 she took part in the second season of Swedish reality TV show Så mycket bättre (So much better) on TV4. The show puts well-known Swedish musicians up against each other to create new interpretations of the other artists songs. She participated along with Timbuktu, Eva Dahlgren, Lena Philipsson, E-Type, Tomas Ledin and Mikael Wiehe and soon emerged as the favourite with her cover versions regularly topping the Swedish iTunes download charts and the official Sverigetopplistan downloads chart following the release of the weekly compilations of the week's covers from the show. Laleh's cover of Eva Dahlgren "Ängeln I Rummet" (Angel in the Room) reached number six on the official Swedish Singles Chart whilst topping the downloads chart in December 2011 to become her most successful song in Sweden to date in terms of peak chart position and until the release of "Some Die Young" sales too. Similarly her renditions of Tomas Ledin's "Just Nu" (Right Now) and Timbuktu's "Alla vill till himmelen men ingen vill dö" (Everyone wants to go to heaven but nobody wants to die) peaked at number 25, whilst "Here I Go Again" peaked at number one on the digital chart. During the showings of Så mycket bättre, Laleh broke a Swedish digital chart record^{[a]} by having ten songs on the top sixty list, including nine inside the top 40, as a number of catalogue songs returned to the chart, including the first placement for "Bjurö klubb". Additionally two interpretations of her songs by other artists appeared, bringing a total of twelve songs with her involvement in the chart at once. Tolkningarna (Interpretations), an extended play of all of the songs she performed on the show was released digitally on 25 December 2011 and was also bundled with the physical release of her following studio album.

Her fourth studio album was originally due to be released in December 2011 to coincide with her appearance on Så mycket bättre, but was postponed due to scheduling difficulties with the show. The name, artwork, release date and track listing of the album were announced in December. Sjung ("Sing") was released on 25 January 2012 across Scandinavia to positive reviews, with "Some Die Young" serving as the lead single, released three days earlier. The album peaked at number one on the Swedish chart for four weeks, and also charted at number one in Norway. The single peaked at number nine on the Swedish Singles Chart and number one in Norway for eight consecutive weeks, later certified fourteen times platinum in the latter country by IFPI. The song became closely associated with the period of national mourning amidst the 2011 Norway attacks, with newspaper articles, university lectures and a number of fan videos to this effect emerging. Laleh was invited to perform as one of only two international artists at the official memorial concert in Oslo on the first anniversary of the event in 2012, and later performed the song at the 2012 Nobel Peace Prize Concert. "Vårens Första Dag" was released as the album's second single in May 2012.

A tour to promote the album included fifteen dates across Sweden between March and April 2012, and one event in Oslo, Norway. The tour was successful, with generally sold-out venues, with the Gothenburg concert with 6.400 attendants as the top event. She did a festival tour in Sweden and Norway during the summer of 2012.

=== 2013–2015: Colors and working in the United States ===
Her fifth studio album, Colors, was released in the autumn of 2013 across Scandinavia, achieving success across Sweden and Norway. In interviews before the album, she stated her intention to challenge herself to create a more cohesive record that didn't spread as much as previous productions. However, Laleh was unable to promote the album as intended. Three days after the album release, her mother died from cancer, and large parts of the promotional plans had to be cancelled.

In the autumn of 2014, the documentary Jag är inte beredd att dö än (I am not ready to die yet) premiered in cinemas. The film, directed by Fredrik Egerstrand and Kalle Gustafsson Jerneholm, is a 75-minute long portrait of Laleh's music, background, relationship with their mother and thoughts about life and creation. The film was recorded over two years.

This period marked the first steps of launching Laleh's career outside of Scandinavia. In July 2013, Laleh signed with Universal Music Germany. Her first release in the German-speaking territories was a re-worked version of "Some Die Young", issued on 30 August 2013 alongside a new version of the music video. It became her first song to chart in Germany and achieved top ten success in Austria.

In 2014 she moved to Los Angeles, signing with Island Records and releasing the EP Boom in September of the same year. In November 2014 she was invited to record a version of "Chiquitita" as part of a project by ABBA The Museum in support of UNICEF, subsequently performing the interpretation at the UN General Assembly on 20 November 2014. In 2015 she played a series of concerts at The Hotel Café in Los Angeles and at South by Southwest in Austin. Her song "Speaking of Truth" was featured in the E! Channel original scripted series The Royals in March 2015. In 2015, Laleh co-wrote "Stone Cold", "Yes" and "Father" from Demi Lovato's fifth studio album, Confident, and two songs for Tori Kelly's first album Unbreakable Smile. She co-wrote, produced and featured on Adam Lambert's 2016 single "Welcome to the Show". Lambert and Laleh performed the single live on American Idol.

=== 2016–2021: Kristaller, Vänta! and Postcards ===
While living in US, she wrote, recorded, and produced a new album, Kristaller ("Crystals"), with ten songs, five of which were in Swedish. The album's lead single, "Bara få va mig själv" ("Just be myself"), became Laleh's most successful release in Sweden, gaining 4× Platinum certification. The song was nominated for Song of the Year at the 2017 Grammis, whilst Laleh was nominated for Composer of the Year, won Producer of the Year for the second time in her career, and also won Pop of the Year for the album. In late 2016 she toured in Sweden, performing in indoor arenas, including selling out the Globen. Her show included a symphony orchestra.

Two further studio albums were released in 2019 and 2020, Vänta! ("Wait!") and Postcards respectively. The latter is a collection of songs previously written and produced with established international artists in newly acoustic arrangements.

=== 2022-present: New record label, Vatten and Jag är ===
In 2022, Laleh established a new production company, publishing company, and label, Palang, which is the Persian word for Leopard. The company is backed by the Universal Music Group, marking the end of Laleh's relationship with Warner Music Sweden that had remained since her debut. Laleh has explained that the intention of the new company is to create a producer/songwriter hub supporting other Swedish artists, in particular women who are under-represented in pop music production. The first signing was Swedish duo Grandi. Laleh's first release under this new arrangement was the single "Leopard", followed by the album Vatten ("Water") on 25 March 2022, becoming her third number one on the Swedish album chart.

On her 40th birthday in 2022, Laleh became the first Swedish female to headline the Ullevi stadium in Gothenburg. When the tickets were released, 15,000 were sold in the first hour. The concert, which featured orchestration from the Gothenburg Symphony Orchestra, was broadcast on SVT1 on 2 January 2023 and made available on SVT Play on 28 December 2022. An accompanying documentary directed by Sara Aren going behind the scenes of the concert preparations was also broadcast on SVT2 on 30 December 2022 under the title Laleh – välkommen hem (Laleh - Welcome Home).

In the summer of 2023, Laleh will go on tour for the first time in four years, with a further concert at the Ullevi, alongside a similarly historic show at Tele2 Arena in Stockholm, once again becoming the first Swedish female solo act to headline at the venue. Laleh is scheduled to release her tenth studio album, Jag är, on 27 June 2025; on the same day, she will embark on a summer tour to mark 20 years as a recording artist.

== Discography ==
Studio albums

- 2005: Laleh
- 2006: Prinsessor
- 2009: Me and Simon
- 2012: Sjung
- 2013: Colors
- 2016: Kristaller
- 2019: Vänta!
- 2019: Postcards (Songs Created For and With Friends)
- 2022: Vatten
- 2025: Jag är

Extended plays

- 2011: Tolkningarna
- 2014: Boom
- 2020: Vatten

== Awards and nominations ==
Year	Ceremony	Category	Title	Result
2005	Rockbjörnen Awards	Swedish Song of the Year	"Live Tomorrow"	Nominated
2005	Rockbjörnen Awards	Swedish Female Artist of the Year	Laleh Pourkarim	Won
2005	Rockbjörnen Awards	Swedish Album of the Year	"Laleh"	Nominated
2005	Rockbjörnen Awards	Swedish Newcomer	Laleh Pourkarim	Won
2005	Grammis Awards	Album of the Year	"Laleh"	Nominated
2005	Grammis Awards	Artist of the Year	Laleh Pourkarim	Won
2005	Grammis Awards	New Artist of the Year	Laleh Pourkarim	Won
2005	Grammis Awards	Composer of the Year	Laleh Pourkarim	Nominated
2005	Grammis Awards	Producer of the Year	Laleh Pourkarim	Won
2005	Grammis Awards	Lyricist of the Year	Laleh Pourkarim	Nominated
2005	Grammis Awards	Ballad of the Year	"Live Tomorrow"	Nominated
2006	P3 Gold Awards	Newcomer of the Year	Laleh Pourkarim	Won
2006	P3 Gold Awards	Gold Fox Award (Best Live Act)	Laleh Pourkarim	Nominated
2006	P3 Gold Awards	Year's Female Artist	"Laleh"	Won
2006	P3 Gold Awards	Year's Best Single	"Live Tomorrow"	Nominated
2006	Taubesällskapet	Evert Taube Scholarship	Laleh Pourkarim	Won
2008	Grammis Awards	Female Artist of the Year	Laleh Pourkarim (for Princessor)	Nominated
2008	Grammis Awards	Producer of the Year	Laleh Pourkarim (for Princessor)	Nominated
2010	Grammis Awards	Female Artist of the Year	Laleh Pourkarim (for Me and Simon)	Nominated
2012	Gaygalan Awards	Artist of the Year	Laleh Pourkarim	Won
2012	Gaygalan Awards	Swedish Song of the Year	"Ängeln I Rummet"	Nominated
2012	Ulla Billquist Prize	Ulla Billquist Scholarship	Laleh Pourkarim	Won
2012	Swedish Publisher Prize	Lyricist of the year	Laleh Pourkarim	Won
2013	P3 Guld Awards	The Gold MIc (Best Live Act)	Laleh	Nominated
2013	Grammis Awards	Song of the Year	"Some Die Young"	Nominated
2013	Grammis Awards	Composer of the Year	Laleh Pourkarim	Nominated
2013	Grammis Awards	Pop Artist of the Year	Laleh Pourkarim	Nominated
2013	Grammis Awards	Lyricist of the Year	Laleh Pourkarim	Nominated
2013	Swedish Radio Chart Prize	Artist of the Year	Laleh	Won
2013	Swedish Radio Chart Prize	Song of the Year	"Some Die Young"	Won
2013	Swedish Radio Chart Prize	Composer of the Year	Laleh Pourkarim	Won
2016	STIM	Platinum Guitar songwriters' award	Laleh Pourkarim	Won
2016	Sten A. Olsson cultural scholarship	Musician Award	Laleh Pourkarim	Won
2017	P3 Guld Awards	Artist of the Year	Laleh	Nominated
2017	P3 Guld Awards	Song of the Year	"Bara få va mig själv"	Nominated
2017	Gaygalan Awards	Swedish Song of the Year	"Bara få va mig själv"	Won
2017	Grammis Awards	Song of the Year	"Bara få va mig själv"	Nominated
2017	Grammis Awards	Composer of the Year	Laleh Pourkarim	Nominated
2017	Grammis Awards	Pop of the Year	Kristaller	Won
2017	Grammis Awards	Producer of the Year	Laleh Pourkarim	Won
2019	Natur & Kultur cultural award	Cultural prize	Laleh Pourkarim	Won

== See also ==
- List of famous Persian women
- List of Swedes in music
- List of Universal Music Group artists
- Swedish pop music

== Notes ==
- ^{1} This refers to the Swedish DigiListan chart which counts music sold and distributed online only. The record on the Sverigetopplistan belongs to songs from Satan i gatan by Veronica Maggio which managed eleven simultaneously charting songs in the top thirty six months earlier.
