= Laleh (album) =

Studio album by Laleh
- Released: 30 March 2005
- Recorded: 2004–2005
- Genre: Pop; Pop rock; Folk
- Length: 48:08
- Label: Lost Army / Warner Music Sweden
- Producer: Laleh Pourkarim

Laleh chronology
Laleh (2005)	Prinsessor (2006)

Singles from Laleh
- 1. "Invisible (My Song)" Released: 5 February 2005; 2. "Storebror" Released: 4 May 2005; 3. "Live Tomorrow" Released: 31 August 2005; 4. "Forgive but Not Forget" Released: 12 February 2006

Professional ratings
Review scores
Source	Rating
Expressen	3/5 stars
Helsingborgs Dagblad	3/5 stars
Svenska Dagbladet	4/6 stars

Laleh is the self-titled debut album by Swedish singer-songwriter Laleh, released on 30 March 2005 on Warner Music Sweden Records. The album, which was both written and produced by Laleh herself, was nominated to "Album of the Year" at the Grammis Awards for 2005 but lost to pop singer Robyn for her self-titled album "Robyn". The album was also a success on the Swedish Albums Chart where it peaked at number one and stayed on the list for 71 weeks. The album is sung in English, Swedish and Persian.

== Singles ==
- "Invisible (My Song)" was released as Laleh's debut single on 5 February 2005. The song peaked at number seven on the Swedish Singles Chart and is so far the only top ten song written by Laleh on the Swedish Singles Chart.
- "Storebror" was released as Laleh's second single on 4 May 2005. The song didn't manage to break into the charts.
- "Live Tomorrow" was released as Laleh's third single on 31 August 2005. The song peaked at number twenty on the Swedish Singles Chart and at number eleven on the Danish Singles Chart.
- "Forgive But Not Forget" was released as Laleh's fourth single on 12 February 2006. The song peaked at number forty-six on the Swedish Singles Chart.

== Track listing ==
All songs written, performed, recorded and produced by Laleh.

No.	Title	Length
1.	"Invisible (My Song)"	4:18
2.	"Live Tomorrow"	3:37
3.	"Forgive But Not Forget"	3:11
4.	"Interlude"	1:10
5.	"Hame Baham"	3:46
6.	"Bostadsansökan (Housing Application)"	1:10
7.	"Interlude"	1:10
8.	"Kom Tilda (Come Tilda)"	4:09
9.	"Storebror (Big Brother)"	4:04
10.	"Tell Me"	3:43
11.	"Salvation"	4:11
12.	"How Wrong"	3:39
13.	"Han tuggar kex"	3:35
14.	"Der yek gooshe"	3:24
15.	"Hide Away"	3:53
Total length:		48:08

== Credits ==
=== Additional personnel ===
- Magnus Larsson – bass (on "Storebror")

=== Production ===
- Mastering: Henrik Johnson
- Mastering studio: Masters of Audio
- Mixing: Henrik Edenhed
- Mixing studio: Ljudhavet
- Photography: Nina Ramsby, Sevin Aslanzadeh

== Charts ==
=== Weekly charts ===
Chart (2005–2006)	Peak position
Swedish Albums (Sverigetopplistan)	1

=== Year-end charts ===
Chart (2005)	Position
Swedish Albums (Sverigetopplistan)	6
Chart (2006)	Position
Swedish Albums (Sverigetopplistan)	8
