= Live Tomorrow =

Single by Laleh

from the album Laleh
- B-side: "Live Tomorrow (Acoustic)"
- Released: 23 August 2005 (Digital download); 31 August 2005 (CD single)
- Recorded: 2004
- Genre: Pop
- Length: 3:37
- Label: Lost Army / Warner Music Sweden
- Songwriter(s): Laleh Pourkarim
- Producer(s): Laleh Pourkarim

Laleh singles chronology
"Storebror" (2005)	"Live Tomorrow" (2005)	"Forgive But Not Forget" (2006)

"Live Tomorrow" is the third single by Swedish singer-songwriter Laleh from her self-titled debut album, released on 31 August 2005. She personally wrote and produced the song, which was nominated to "Song of the Year" at the "P3 Guld Awards" in 2005.

The song became a success in Sweden and Denmark when it came in first on the Swedish radio station SR P3's radio show "Tracks" (Trackslistan) where listeners vote for their favourite songs in a top 20 list. The first time the song came up on Tracks was on 27 August 2005. It was then on fifteenth place. The song kept on climbing up onto the list and was only a week later, on sixth place. On 1 October "Live Tomorrow" came in first place on "Tracks" and beat James Blunt's song "You're Beautiful" which had been in first place for three weeks. "Live Tomorrow" was in first place on "Tracks" for six weeks until "Hung Up" with Madonna took the place on 12 November. The original track and lyrics were written by herself while the production was carried out by Iron-Moose records and later handed off to Warner Music Sweden.

The song was used in the Swedish 2007 film Solstorm.

== Chart performance ==
In Sweden, "Live Tomorrow" entered the Swedish Singles Chart at fifty-two on 8 September 2005. Two weeks later, on 22 September, it climbed to thirty-one. The song peaked at number twenty on 13 October. It was kept on the list for twenty-two weeks and ended at fifty-five.

In Denmark, "Live Tomorrow" debuted at fourteen on the Danish Singles Chart on 24 February 2006. The song reached its peak position of number eleven, the last week in charts, on 28 April 2006.

== Music video ==
The music video for "Live Tomorrow" was directed by Martin Fodor-Nilsson, who has directed several other music videos for Laleh including "Invisible (My Song)" and "Storebror". It was filmed on the island of Fårö, Gotland in August 2004 and features Laleh singing on the deserted island.

== Live performances ==
Laleh performed "Live Tomorrow" on several television shows in Sweden including Trackslistan, Faddergalan and Grammisgalan. She performed the song on Trackslistan in October 2005, in connection with the first place of the song. Two months later, in December 2005, she performed the song on Faddergalan live from Ghana to support poor African children. She also performed her song "Salvation" which is also from her debut album. In February 2006, she performed "Live Tomorrow" on Grammisgalan where she also performed her single "Forgive But Not Forget" which had been released that month.

== Track listing ==
1. "Live Tomorrow" – 3:37
2. "Live Tomorrow (Acoustic)" – 3:26

== Charts ==
Chart (2005/2006)	Peak position
Danish Singles Chart	11
Swedish Singles Chart	20
