= Petra Marklund discography =

September (Petra Marklund) discography
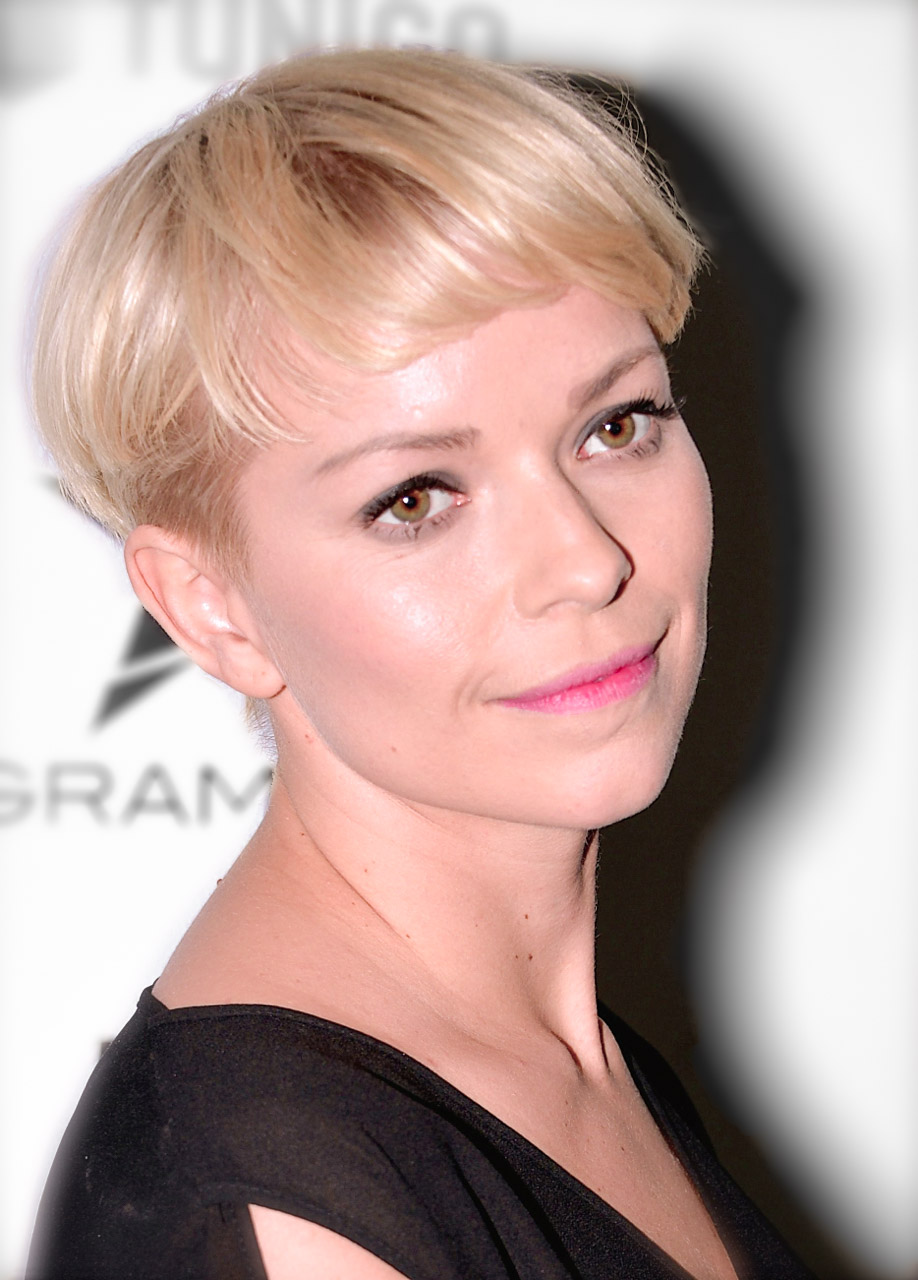
- Petra Marklund in 2013
- Studio albums: 8
- Extended plays: 1
- Compilation albums: 4
- Singles: 42

The discography of Swedish singer and songwriter Petra Marklund, also known as September, consists of seven studio albums, four compilation albums, one extended play and 41 singles. September released her debut album, September, in 2004; it spawned three top 10 hits: "La La La (Never Give It Up)", "We Can Do It" and "September All Over". Her second studio album, In Orbit, was released in 2005 and produced two top 10 hits in Sweden: "Satellites" and "Cry for You", while the second single from the album, "Looking for Love", peaked inside the top 20. "Cry for You" was a worldwide hit and remains September's biggest hit to date, peaking inside the top 10 in countries such as Austria, Denmark, the Netherlands, France, Ireland, Switzerland and the United Kingdom. The song also peaked at number 74 on the Hot 100 in the United States and was certified gold for shipment of over 500,000 copies by the Recording Industry Association of America. The song was the first by a Swedish artist to be certified by the RIAA since Ace of Base's "Cruel Summer" in 1998.

September released her third album, Dancing Shoes, in 2007. Three singles were released from it: "Can't Get Over", "Until I Die" and "Because I Love You". The first two singles peaked inside the top 5 in Sweden. "Can't Get Over" received moderate success worldwide, charting inside the top 50 in most countries; in the United Kingdom, it peaked at number 12. In 2008, September released her debut album in the United States, Canada and Australia called September; it includes songs from her previous albums, In Orbit and Dancing Shoes. In the United Kingdom, Cry For You was released as her debut album. September's fourth studio album, Love CPR, was released in 2011 and reached number one in the Swedish album chart, becoming her first number-one hit there. The album spawned six singles, including the number-one hit "Mikrofonkåt", "Resuscitate Me", "Me & My Microphone", "Party in My Head" as well as "Hands Up", which was later featured in the American comedy film Last Vegas. In 2012, Marklund released her fifth studio album, Inferno, under her real name. It reached number one in Sweden and its lead single, "Händerna mot himlen", peaked at number two and was certified 6× Platinum.

== Studio albums ==
=== September ===
Title	Details	Peak chart positions				Certifications
Title	Details	SWE	CZ	FIN	POL	Certifications
September	Released: 11 February 2004; Formats: CD, digital download	36	—	—	—	
In Orbit	Released: 26 October 2005; Formats: CD, digital download	17	—	36	10	ZPAV: Gold
Dancing Shoes	Released: 26 September 2007; Formats: CD, digital download	12	—	—	19	
Love CPR	Released: 14 February 2011; Formats: CD, digital download	1	33	26	26	GLF: 2× Platinum
"—" denotes releases that did not chart or was not released.

=== Petra Marklund ===
Title	Details	Peak chart positions	Certifications
Title	Details	SWE	Certifications
Teen Queen	Released: 2000; Formats: CD	—	
Inferno	Released: 17 October 2012; Formats: CD, digital download, LP	1	GLF: Platinum
Ensam inte stark	Released: 13 November 2015; Formats: CD, digital download, LP	11	
Frimärken	Released: 11 June 2021; Formats: Digital download	—	
"—" denotes releases that did not chart or was not released.

== Compilation albums ==
=== September ===
Title	Details	Peak chart positions	
Title	Details	AUS Hit.	US Elec.
September	Released: 26 February 2008 (US, Japan, Canada, Australia); Formats: CD, digital download	15	22
Dancing in Orbit	Released: 8 May 2008 (Benelux); Formats: CD, digital download	—	—
Gold	Released: 14 November 2008 (Germany, Scandinavia, Australia, Russia and France); Formats: CD, digital download	—	—
Cry for You – The Album	Released: 2 August 2009 (UK, Ireland); Formats: Digital download	—	—
"—" denotes releases that did not chart or was not released.

== Extended plays ==
=== Petra Marklund ===
Title	Details
Maneter	Released: 16 October 2020; Formats: Digital download

== Singles ==
=== September ===
==== As lead artist ====
Year	Song	Peak chart positions											Certification	Album
Year	Song	SWE	AUS	FIN	IRE	NLD	POL	ROM	SPA	UK	US	US Dance	Certification	Album
2003	"La La La (Never Give It Up)"	8	—	—	—	—	—	7	—	—	—	—		September
2003	"We Can Do It"	10	—	—	—	—	—	—	—	—	—	—		September
2004	"September All Over"	8	—	—	—	—	—	—	—	—	—	—		September
2005	"Satellites"	4	—	18	—	—	1	5	1	96	—	8	GLF: Platinum; BPI: Silver	In Orbit
2005	"Looking for Love"	17	—	—	—	—	4	—	15	—	—	—		In Orbit
2006	"Flowers on the Grave"	—	—	—	—	—	—	—	—	—	—	—		In Orbit
2006	"It Doesn't Matter"	—	—	—	—	—	—	66	—	—	—	—		In Orbit
2006	"Cry for You"	6	14	13	8	10	—	—	9	5	74	1	IFPI DEN: Platinum; RIAA: Gold; ARIA: Gold; MC: Gold; GLF: Gold; BPI: Gold	In Orbit
2007	"Can't Get Over"	5	41	10	38	35	—	—	5	14	—	12		Dancing Shoes
2007	"Until I Die"	5	—	6	—	91	4	29	—	—	—	—		Dancing Shoes
2008	"Because I Love You"	43	—	—	—	—	—	—	—	—	—	—		Dancing Shoes
2010	"Mikrofonkåt"	1	—	—	—	—	—	—	—	—	—	—	GLF: 8× Platinum	Love CPR
2010	"Resuscitate Me"	45	—	—	—	—	—	—	—	—	—	—		Love CPR
2010	"Kärlekens tunga"	6	—	—	—	—	—	—	—	—	—	—	GLF: Platinum	Love CPR
2010	"Baksmälla" (with Petter)	3	—	—	—	—	—	—	—	—	—	—	GLF: Platinum	Love CPR
2011	"Me & My Microphone"	—	—	—	—	—	—	—	—	—	—	—		Love CPR
2011	"Party in My Head"	32	—	—	—	—	—	—	—	—	—	—		Love CPR
2012	"Hands Up"	—	—	—	—	—	—	—	—	—	—	—		Love CPR
2023	"Ocean of Love"	—	—	—	—	—	—	—	—	—	—	—		

==== As featured artist ====
Year	Song	Album
2008	"Breathe" (Schiller featuring September)	Sehnsucht

=== Petra Marklund ===
==== As lead artist ====
Year	Song	Peak chart positions	Certification	Album
Year	Song	SWE	Certification	Album
2012	"Händerna mot himlen"	2	GLF: 6× Platinum	Inferno
2013	"Sanningen"	—		Inferno
2013	"Förlorad värld"	—		Inferno
2014	"Cecilia"	—		Non-album single
2015	"Det som händer i Göteborg (stannar i Göteborg)"	— (Note: "Det som händer i Göteborg (stannar i Göteborg)" did not enter the Swedish Singles Chart, but peaked at number nine on the Swedish Heatseeker chart.)		Non-album single
2015	"Som du bäddar"	—		Ensam inte stark
2016	"Kidz" (featuring Linnea Henriksson)	—		Ensam inte stark
2016	"Alla känner apan" (Hanzén Remix)	—		Ensam inte stark
2018	"En tuff brud i lyxförpackning"	—		Non-album single
2019	"Som isarna"	54		Så mycket bättre (Alla tolkningarna - Säsong 10)
2019	"Broarna som bär oss över"	95		Så mycket bättre (Alla tolkningarna - Säsong 10)
2019	"Rosa moln"	82		Så mycket bättre (Alla tolkningarna - Säsong 10)
2020	"Du äger ditt skimmer"	—		Maneter, Frimärken
2020	"Djur"	—		Maneter, Frimärken
2020	"Panna mot panna (Forever Young)"	—		Maneter, Frimärken
2020	"Maneter"	—		Maneter, Frimärken
2021	"Rapsodier (Morgonrodnad)"	—		Non-album single
2021	"Kärleken ska gå runt (Pantamera)"	—		Non-album single
2021	"Pengar"	—		Frimärken
2021	"Dom kallar mig för…"	—		Frimärken
2023	"Ocean of Love"	—		

==== As featured artist ====
Year	Song	Album
2012	"A Fairytale of New York" (among PP3 Music Aid)	Non-album single
2019	"Strawberry Fields" (Ludwig Bell featuring Petra Marklund)	Non-album single
