= Dancing in Orbit =

Compilation album by September
- Released: 8 May 2008
- Recorded: 2005–2007
- Genres: Dance; pop
- Label: Silver Angel

September chronology
| September (2008) | Dancing in Orbit (2008) | Gold (2008) |

Singles from Dancing in Orbit
- 1. "Cry for You" Released: 4 October 2007; 2. "Can't Get Over" Released: 7 March 2008; 3. "Until I Die" Released: 3 September 2008; 4. "Because I Love You" Released: 13 July 2009

Dancing in Orbit is a compilation of Swedish singer September's second and third albums, In Orbit and Dancing Shoes, respectively, released on 8 May 2008 in the Netherlands. Following the success of September's first major international hit single, "Cry for You", it was released as September's debut album in the Netherlands and Belgium.

== Track listing ==
All songs written by Jonas von der Burg, Anoo Bhagavan and Niklas von der Burg, except "Looking for Love", which was written by Steven Elson and Dave Stephenson, and "Midnight Heartache", which was written by Jonas von der Burg, Anoo Bhagavan, Niklas von der Burg, Donna Weiss and Jackie DeShannon.

| # | Title | Time |
|---|---|---|
| 1. | Cry for You | 3:30 |
| 2. | Looking for Love | 3:25 |
| 3. | Can't Get Over | 3:02 |
| 4. | Midnight Heartache | 3:45 |
| 5. | Until I Die | 3:47 |
| 6. | Sacrifice | 3:56 |
| 7. | Satellites | 3:15 |
| 8. | Follow Me | 3:31 |
| 9. | Because I Love You | 3:15 |
| 10. | Start It Up | 3:05 |
| 11. | R.I.P. | 3:49 |
| 12. | Taboo | 3:44 |
| 13. | It Doesn't Matter | 3:45 |
| 14. | Sad Song | 2:56 |
| 15. | Freaking Out | 3:24 |
| 16. | Sound Memory | 3:50 |
| 17. | Flowers on the Grave | 4:17 |
| 18. | End of the Rainbow | 3:37 |
| 19. | Satellites (Live Acoustic Version) | 3:01 |

== Singles ==
- Cry For You was released as the first single from the album. It was a huge success in the Netherlands, peaking at #4 in the top 40 and staying for 21 weeks. It also peaked at #6 in France, where it is her only song to have reached the top 100. The song has been certified Gold in the US for sales of 500,000.
- Can't Get Over was chosen to be the second single from the album. The single didn't manage to achieve the same success as "Cry For You" and had a slightly disappointing peak of #28.
- Until I Die was released as the third single in September 2008 but it never managed to get inside the top 40. It did, however, peak at #91 in the Dutch Single Top 100 (which is a totally different list).
- Can't Get Over was re-released in the Netherlands, following the release of the UK radio edit in the UK. This time the song didn't manage to peak in either chart.
- Because I Love You was chosen as the fourth single from the album. It was released on 13 July 2009. It failed to chart but was re-released on 12 October 2009.
