= September (disambiguation) =

September is the ninth month of the year.

September may also refer to:

== Film ==
- September (1984 film), a Chinese film by Tian Zhuangzhuang
- September (1987 film), an American film by Woody Allen
- September (1996 film), German-British television film also known as Rosamunde Pilcher's September
- September (2003 film), a German drama by Max Färberböck
- September (2007 film), an Australian film by Peter Carstairs
- September (2011 film), a Turkish drama by Cemil Ağacıkoğlu
- September (2013 film), a Greek drama by Penny Panayotopoulou
- September, a 2018 film from Nathaniel Dorsky's Arboretum Cycle
- September Films, a UK independent television and film production company

== Music ==
=== Artists ===
- September (band), Yugoslav jazz rock band
- September (singer), Petra Marklund, Swedish singer

=== Albums ===
- September (2004 album), the debut album by September
- September (2008 album), the US debut album by September
- The September EP, a 2005 EP by Anorexia Nervosa

=== Songs and compositions ===
- "September" (song), by Earth, Wind & Fire, 1978
- "September" (Daughtry song), 2010
- "September Song", an American jazz standard composed by Kurt Weill, 1938
- "September", an art song by Charles Ives
- September Music, a composition by David Matthews, 1979–1980
- "September", a song by David Sylvian from Secrets of the Beehive, 1987
- "September", a song by Deborah Cox from One Wish, 2000
- "September", a song by Heather Duby from Post to Wire, 1999
- "September", a song by I Am the World Trade Center from Out of the Loop, 2001
- "September", a song by James Arthur from It'll All Make Sense in the End, 2021
- "September", a song by Jean Michel Jarre from Revolutions, 1988
- "September", a song by Marianas Trench from Fix Me, 2006
- "September", a song by Mariya Takeuchi, 1979
- "September", a song by Ryan Adams from Jacksonville City Nights, 2005
- "September", a song by the Shins from Port of Morrow, 2012
- "September", a song by St. Lucia from When the Night, 2013

== Other uses ==
- September (Roman month), the seventh month of the Roman calendar
- September (Fringe), an Observer from the TV series Fringe
- September (novel), a 1990 novel by Rosamunde Pilcher
- Dulcie September (1935–1988), South African anti-apartheid activist
- Waylain September (born 1984), South African cricketer

== See also ==
- Black September (disambiguation)
- Eternal September, a Usenet term
- Sept (disambiguation)
- Settembre (disambiguation)
