= Gold (September album) =

Greatest hits album by September
- Released: 14 November 2008
- Recorded: 2005–2007
- Genres: Dance-pop; house; Eurodance
- Label: Catchy Tunes

September chronology
Dancing in Orbit (2008)	Gold (2008)	Cry for You – The Album (2009)

Alternative cover

Gold is a compilation album by Swedish singer Petra Marklund released as September. It was released on 14 November 2008 by Catchy Tunes. The album marked her first compilation album for her domestic market, including songs from her second and third albums, In Orbit (2005) and Dancing Shoes (2007), respectively. "Because I Love You", a track previously included on Dancing Shoes, was released as a promotional single for the album on 26 November 2008.

== Track listing ==
All songs written by Jonas von der Burg, Anoo Bhagavan and Niklas von der Burg, except "Looking for Love" written by Steven Elson and Dave Stephenson, and "Midnight Heartache" written by Jonas von der Burg, Anoo Bhagavan, Niklas von der Burg, Donna Weiss and Jackie DeShannon. On the international CD, the track listing differs significantly.

CD
No.	Title	Length
1.	"Cry for You" (UK Radio Edit by Dave Ramone)	2:45
2.	"Because I Love You" (Radio Edit)	3:16
3.	"Can't Get Over"	3:02
4.	"Candy Love"	2:46
5.	"R.I.P."	3:49
6.	"Looking for Love"	3:24
7.	"Satellites"	3:16
8.	"Flowers on the Grave"	4:17
9.	"It Doesn't Matter"	3:45
10.	"Sacrifice"	3:56
11.	"Sad Song"	2:57
12.	"Freaking Out"	3:23
13.	"Taboo"	3:43
14.	"Midnight Heartache"	3:44
15.	"Until I Die"	3:44
16.	"End of the Rainbow"	3:37

Bonus tracks
No.	Title	Length
17.	"Because I Love You" (Jazzy Candlelight Version)	3:52
18.	"Cry for You" (Candlelight Remix)	3:06
19.	"Satellites" (Live Acoustic Version)	3:02

Videos
No.	Title	Length
1.	"Cry for You" (UK video)	2:48
2.	"Cry for You" (September live acoustic version for UK TV "Freshly Squeezed")	2:58

== Release history ==
Country	Date	Format
Austria	14 November 2008	CD, digital download
Germany	14 November 2008	CD, digital download
Switzerland	14 November 2008	CD, digital download
Finland	26 November 2008	CD, digital download
Sweden	17 December 2008	CD, digital download
Russia	13 April 2009	CD, digital download
Australia	12 June 2009	CD, digital download
