= Cry for You – The Album =

Compilation album by September
- Released: 2 August 2009
- Recorded: 2004–2009
- Genre: Dance-pop
- Label: Hard2Beat

September chronology
Gold (2008)	Cry for You – The Album (2009)	Love CPR (2011)

Singles from Cry for You
- 1. "Cry for You" Released: 14 April 2008; 2. "Can't Get Over" Released: 9 March 2009; 3. "Until I Die" Released: 27 July 2009

Cry for You – The Album is the first compilation album by Swedish singer-songwriter Petra Marklund (performing as September) released in the United Kingdom. The album was released on 2 August 2009, as a digital download by Hard2Beat Records. The album includes new material, along with new versions of other songs from previous albums, including a new edit of "Satellites", due to it not being originally released in the UK by Hard2Beat and on a different label. Cry for You features her singles that were released in the UK; "Satellites", "Cry for You", "Can't Get Over" and "Until I Die". Despite "Cry for You" peaking at five on the UK Singles Chart, the album failed to chart on the UK Albums Chart.

== Track listing ==
All tracks written by Jonas von der Burg, Anoo Bhagavan and Niclas von der Burg, except where noted. All tracks produced by Jonas von der Burg, except where noted.

No.	Title	Writer(s)	Producer(s)	Length
1.	"Cry for You" (UK Radio Edit, from In Orbit, 2005)			2:46
2.	"Can't Get Over" (UK Radio Edit, from Dancing Shoes, 2007)			3:10
3.	"Until I Die" (UK Radio Edit, from Dancing Shoes, 2007)			3:13
4.	"Sin of My Own"	Petra Marklund; Gustav Efraimsson; Bjorn Edman	Marklund; Efraimsson; Edman	3:04
5.	"Satellites" (Hard2Beat Edit, from In Orbit, 2005)			3:15
6.	"We Can Do It" (UK Radio Edit, from September, 2004)	Jonas von der Burg; Anoo Bhagavan; Niclas von der Burg; Harold Clayton; Sigidi		3:33
7.	"Flowers on the Grave" ( from In Orbit, 2005)			4:18
8.	"Leave It All Behind" (UK Radio Edit)			2:42
9.	"Looking for Love" (from In Orbit, 2005)	Jonas; Bhagavan; Niclas; Steve Elson; Dave Stephenson		3:23
10.	"September All Over" (from September, 2004)			3:34
11.	"Because I Love You" (Dave Ramone Edit, from Dancing Shoes, 2007)			2:46
12.	"Midnight Heartache" (from In Orbit, 2005)	Jonas; Bhagavan; Niclas; Donna Weiss; Jackie DeShannon		3:45
13.	"Sacrifice" (from In Orbit, 2005)			3:56
14.	"End of the Rainbow" (from In Orbit, 2005)			3:39
15.	"Cry for You" (Original Edit, from Dancing Shoes, 2007)			2:46
16.	"Can't Get Over" (Original Edit, from Dancing Shoes, 2007)			3:00
17.	"Until I Die" (Original Edit, from Dancing Shoes, 2007)			3:42

Notes

- "Leave It All Behind" is denotated as "UK Radio Edit" despite being first released on this album.
- The limited promo CDs removes "Sin of My Own" and "September All Over", but instead includes "Taboo" from Dancing Shoes as track #10.
