= September (2008 album) =

Compilation album by September
- Released: 26 February 2008
- Recorded: 2005–2007
- Label: Robbins Entertainment (US); Central Station (AUS); Awesome (CAN)

September chronology
Dancing Shoes (2007)	September (2008)	Dancing in Orbit (2008)

Singles from September
- 1. "Satellites" Released: 11 July 2006; 2. "Cry for You" Released: 20 March 2007; 3. "Can't Get Over" Released: 27 November 2007

September is the first compilation album by Swedish singer September. The album is a compilation of tracks from her second and third European studio albums, titled In Orbit and Dancing Shoes, respectively, but not from her original, 2004 album, September. The album was the first album by September to be released in the United States, Canada and Australasia.

== Release ==
September initially released the album under the American dance label Robbins Entertainment on 26 February 2008. The album was digitally released in Canada in the summer of 2008. This edition's track list is the same as that of the US edition, with the exception of "Cry for You", for which the UK radio version was used. The physical edition later followed on 23 September 2008. September announced that the album was scheduled to be released in Australia that year. It was released on 14 November 2008. The track listing differed from the US edition's and a DVD containing music videos was included.

== Critical reception ==
Ross Hoffman from AllMusic gave the album a mixed review, awarding it two and a half stars. He noted that the first three songs, which are "Cry for You", "Satellites" and "Can't Get Over", were the best from the album. However, he did say that the album's "material is slightly cringe-inducing". He also said that "The main problem with September's music is that, unlike her Scandinavian counterparts such as Robyn and Annie, she doesn't project much personality – her voice is decent, and even warm at times, but the lyrics are empty and she comes off as a complete cipher." Kurt Kirton from About.com was more favorable, awarding it three and a half stars out of five and stating: "I recommend this album for anyone who enjoys good dance-pop." He said the album's best tracks were "Cry for You", "Satellites" and "Until I Die".

== Chart performance ==
On March 15, the album entered the Billboard Top Electronic Albums chart at number 22, but has since gone off the chart. All three singles from the album charted on the Billboard Hot Dance Airplay chart, with "Cry for You" reaching No. 1, "Satellites" No. 8 for two weeks and "Can't Get Over" No. 12. "Cry for You" also peaked at number 74 on the singles popularity chart, the Billboard Hot 100.

== Track listing ==
All songs written by Jonas von der Burg, Anoo Bhagavan and Niklas von der Burg, except "Looking for Love", which was written by Steven Elson and Dave Stephenson, and "Midnight Heartache", which was written by Jonas von der Burg, Anoo Bhagavan, Niklas von der Burg, Donna Weiss and Jackie de Shanon.

1. "Cry for You" (Radio Edit) – 3:32
2. "Satellites" (US Mix) – 3:09
3. "Can't Get Over" – 3:02
4. "Flowers on the Grave" – 4:18
5. "My Neighbourhood" – 3:04
6. "Sad Song" – 2:57
7. "Until I Die" – 3:43
8. "Because I Love You" – 3:14
9. "Candy Love" – 2:47
10. "Taboo" – 3:44
11. "Looking for Love" – 3:24
12. "Midnight Heartache" – 3:47
13. "Freaking Out" – 3:26
14. "R.I.P." – 3:49

=== Australian version ===
==== CD ====
1. "Satellites" – 3:16
2. "Cry for You" – 3:32
3. "Can't Get Over" – 3:02
4. "Because I Love You" – 3:14
5. "Sad Song" – 2:57
6. "Looking for Love" – 3:24
7. "Flowers on the Grave" – 4:18
8. "Until I Die" – 3:43
9. "Freaking Out" – 3:26
10. "Taboo" – 3:44
11. "Candy Love" – 2:47
12. "Midnight Heartache" – 3:47
13. "Sound Memory" – 3:26
14. "Follow Me" – 3:35
15. "R.I.P." – 3:49
16. "Cry For You" (Candelight Edit) – 3:02

==== DVD ====
1. "Cry for You (UK Music Video)
2. "Until I Die (Music Video)
3. "Can't Get Over" (Music Video)
4. "Satellites" (Music Video)
5. "Looking For Love" (Music Video)
6. "Cry for You" (Original Music Video)

== Charts ==
Chart (2008)	Peak position
ARIA Australian Hitseekers Albums	15
ARIA Australian Dance Albums	18
Billboard Top Electronic Albums	22

== Release history ==
Region	Date	Format	Label
United States	26 February 2008	CD	Robbins
Canada	23 September 2008	CD	Awesome Music, Robbins
Australia	14 November 2008	CD	Central Station
