= Mikrofonkåt =

1999 song

Mikrofonkåt (literally "Microphone Horny") is a Swedish song written by Swedish rappers Thomas Rusiak and Petter, originally performed by Petter. Taken from Petter's album Mitt sjätte sinne, Mikrofonkåt was ranked #53 on the Swedish Singles Chart in 1999.

In 2010, the Swedish singer September covered it as "Me and My Microphone" in a Europop song that topped the Swedish charts for eleven consecutive weeks.

== Petter's version ==
"Mikrofonkåt"

Single by Petter

from the album Mitt Sjätte Sinne
- Released: 1999
- Recorded: 1998
- Genre: Slow rap
- Label: BMG
- Songwriters: Thomas Rusiak, Petter Askergren

=== Chart performance ===
Petter's rap release had a short run in 1999, where it was ranked in the Swedish Singles charts for three weeks. On 28 January 1999, it peaked at #53 on the chart.

Chart (1999)	Peak position
Sweden (Sverigetopplistan)	53

== September version ==
"Mikrofonkåt"

Single by September

from the album Love CPR and Så mycket bättre
- Released: 12 November 2010
- Recorded: 2010
- Genre: Electropop; dance-pop; EDM
- Length: 2:43
- Label: Catchy Tunes/TV4
- Songwriters: Thomas Rusiak, Petter Askergren, Petra Marklund, Niklas Bergwall and Lendinsky

September singles chronology
"Until I Die" (2007)	"Mikrofonkåt" (2010)	"Resuscitate Me" (2010)

In 2010, the song was re-recorded and released by Swedish singer-songwriter Petra Marklund (performing as September) as a single from her fourth studio album Love CPR. The song debuted at number one on the Swedish singles chart Sverigetopplistan, and held the position for eleven consecutive weeks. The song is regarded as one of the 100 most successful singles of all time in Sweden. Following its success, an English-language adaptation titled "Me & My Microphone" was released.

=== Background and musical structure ===
Before the song's release, Petra Marklund appeared on the Swedish television program Så mycket bättre ("So much better") from October though December 2010. For each episode of the show, the artists performed cover versions of songs by other artists appearing on the program. When Petter appeared as a guest on 7 November 2010, September sang "Mikrofonkåt" accompanied by new upbeat dance music. The song has a Euro-dance beat, with strong pop elements. It was later announced that the song would be released as a single.

=== Chart performance ===
Marklund's cover debuted at number one in Sweden and remained in this position for eleven consecutive weeks, making it her first song to be ranked number one in her home country. It was also the second-highest selling single in Sweden in 2010, selling over 300,000 copies and receiving the highest certification of 8× Platinum. As of May 2012, it is listed as number 30 in Sweden's Best Of All Time.

==== Weekly charts ====
Chart (2010)	Peak position
European Hot 100 Singles	76
Sweden (Sverigetopplistan)	1

==== Year-end charts ====
Chart (2010)	Position
Sweden (Sverigetopplistan)	2
Chart (2011)	Position
Sweden (Sverigetopplistan)	7

=== Release history ===
Region	Date	Format	Label
Denmark	12 November 2010	Digital download	Catchy Tunes
Sweden	12 November 2010	Digital download	Catchy Tunes
Finland	12 November 2010	Digital download	Catchy Tunes
Norway	12 November 2010	Digital download	Catchy Tunes
Denmark	21 December 2010	Digital download – Extended Remix	Catchy Tunes
Finland	21 December 2010	Digital download – Extended Remix	Catchy Tunes
Norway	21 December 2010	Digital download – Extended Remix	Catchy Tunes
Sweden	21 December 2010	Digital download – Extended Remix	Catchy Tunes

== Me & My Microphone ==
"Me & My Microphone"

Single by September

from the album Love CPR
- Released: 11 February 2011
- Recorded: 2010
- Genre: Eurodance; synth-pop; dance-pop; electropop
- Length: 2:45
- Label: Catchy Tunes (Scandinavia), Robbins Entertainment (US), All Around The World, (UK)
- Songwriters: Thomas Rusiak, Niklas Bergwall, Petter Alexis, Petra Marklund, Daniel Alexander
- Producer: Niklas Bergwall

September singles chronology
"Resuscitate Me" (2010)	"Me & My Microphone" (2011)	"Party in My Head" (2011)

Alternative cover
- US cover

"Me & My Microphone" is a song by Swedish recording artist September released from her fourth studio album Love CPR. The song was written by several writers, including September and fellow Swedish rapper Petter. The song is the English version of "Mikrofonkåt." "Me & My Microphone" has become a modest success for September, reaching number forty-eight on the Belgium (Wallonia) chart. Compared to the original Swedish "Mikrofonkåt," which was number one on the Swedish singles chart for 11 weeks, the song is a commercial failure.

The song was released in the United States on 12 April 2011 as the first international single from Love CPR, while becoming the third single in Scandinavia, following "Mikrofonkåt" and "Resuscitate Me." September performed the song live on the Norwegian-Swedish television talk show Skavlan on 14 January 2011.

=== Composition ===
"Me & My Microphone"
A 22-second sample of September's "Me & My Microphone", featuring September singing the chorus of the track.

"Me & My Microphone" was written by Thomas Rusiak, Niklas Bergwall, rapper Petter, Daniel Alexander, and September, with production credits to Bergwall. The song is an English adaption of "Mikrofonkåt."

=== Critical reception ===
Scandipop gave the song a positive review, praising the bass and lyrics, while calling the song "pop genius." This Must Be Pop listed the track as their no.1 single of November to coincide with its UK release.

=== Music video ===
According to Stephanie K., A&R of September's US label Robbins Entertainment, a music video for the song has been planned. In the United Kingdom, September has recently departed from her record label, Dance Nation to join her former label, All Around The World. September's first UK single, Satellites, was released through All Around The World in September 2006. Recently, All Around The World have confirmed that videos for "Me & My Microphone" and "Party In My Head" will be produced in order to promote their release in the United Kingdom in the summer of 2011.

=== Release and promotion ===
For the US release of the song, the Scandinavian remixes were used, along with "Mikrofonkåt."

September performed the song for the first time on the Scandinavian talk show Skavlan. Her performance on the show received positive reception from Scandipop, who called it "fierce."

=== Track listing ===
- Scandinavian digital and CD extended play
1. "Me & My Microphone" (Original) – 2:48
2. "Me & My Microphone" (Extended) – 4:28
3. "Me & My Microphone" (Casado & Daif Radio Edit) – 3:40
4. "Me & My Microphone" (Casado & Daif Remix) – 6:22
5. "Me & My Microphone" (Alex Lamb Radio Edit) – 3:39
6. "Me & My Microphone" (Alex Lamb Remix) – 6:45
7. "Me & My Microphone" (Punchy Radio Edit) – 3:46
8. "Me & My Microphone" (Punchy Remix) – 6:11
9. "Me & My Microphone" (Mick Kastenholt & Andrew Dee Remix) – 7:10
- US digital download
1. "Me And My Microphone" (Radio Edit) – 2:45
2. "Me And My Microphone" (Extended) – 4:24
3. "Me And My Microphone" (Punchy Remix) – 6:07
4. "Me And My Microphone" (Casado & Daif Remix) – 6:18
5. "Me And My Microphone" (Alex Lamb Remix) – 6:41
6. "Me And My Microphone" (Mick Kastenholt & Andrew Dee Remix) – 7:03
7. "Mikrofonkåt" – 2:43

=== Charts ===
Chart (2011)	Peak position
Belgium (Ultratop 50 Wallonia)	41
US Dance/Mix Show Airplay (Billboard)	15

=== Release history ===
Region	Date	Format	Label
Belgium	11 February 2011	Digital download	Mostiko
Sweden	14 February 2011	CD single	Catchy Tunes
Norway	25 February 2011	Digital download	Catchy Tunes/Family Tree Music AB
United States	12 April 2011	Digital download	Robbins Entertainment
United Kingdom	4 December 2011	Digital download	All Around The World

== Other versions ==
- In 2004, Petter released a music video on Sony BMG for the song.
- There is also a cover version by Teo Holmer.
