= September Song (disambiguation) =

"September Song" is an American pop standard, originally performed in Knickerbocker Holiday (1938).

September Song may also refer to:

- September Song (album), a 1963 album by Jimmy Durante
- "September Song" (JP Cooper song), 2016
- September Song (TV series), a British television comedy-drama
- "September Song" (Three's a Crowd), a 1985 television episode

== See also ==
- September Songs – The Music of Kurt Weill, a 1994 documentary
- September (disambiguation)#Songs and compositions, multiple songs with this title
