= Inferno (Petra Marklund album) =

Studio album by Petra Marklund
- Released: 17 October 2012
- Studio: Music & Words (Stockholm)
- Genre: Pop
- Length: 42:19
- Language: Swedish
- Label: Razzia
- Producer: Daniel Ledinsky; Saska Becker

Petra Marklund chronology
Love CPR (2011)	Inferno (2012)	Ensam inte stark (2015)

Singles from Inferno
- 1. "Händerna mot himlen" Released: 14 September 2012; 2. "Sanningen" Released: 18 January 2013; 3. "Förlorad värld" Released: 17 May 2013

Inferno is the first studio album by Swedish singer and songwriter Petra Marklund under her birth name since her 1999 album, Teen Queen. It was released on 17 October 2012 by Razzia Records and is the follow-up to Love CPR, Marklund's fourth album under the alias September.

The album debuted at #1 on the Swedish Album Chart on 26 October 2012, with lead single "Händerna mot himlen" also reaching its peak position of #2 that same date. Inferno was certified Platinum in Sweden for equivalent sales of over 40,000 copies.

Inferno was nominated for a Swedish Grammis Award in the category Pop of the Year. At the 2014 Grammis Awards, video director Magnus Härdner was nominated for Music Video of the Year for his work on the video to the album's second single, "Sanningen".

== Background ==
In 2012, Marklund announced on septembermusic.se that she was recording her first Swedish studio album.

In an interview with dn.se, she officially confirmed that the next album would be released under her birth name, Petra Marklund, rather than releasing a fifth September album. She announced that this album would have no trace of her signature dance-pop style, and stated the album would be "dark and personal." She also stated that the album would contain influences of pop and hip hop.

Upon the announcement of the album, Marklund said "it doesn't mean I 'quit' September, it just means I'm gonna do more music. September is on my mind all the time and there will be more in the future!"

Lead single "Händerna mot himlen" was released on 14 September 2012. It peaked at #2 and was certified 6× Platinum in Sweden.

== Reviews ==
scandipop.co.uk stated that the singing is very good, but the production is the big 'wow' factor. They stated, "does Inferno sound like those September albums of old that we cherish? No, nothing like it. But does that matter? No, not in the slightest – it’s really very good. Very very good, in fact."

Hanna Fahl from DN also complimented the album saying "it's a cohesive album, superbly well written, and in some moments it can lift and fly" and complimented Marklund for being "strong and present". However, unlike Scandipop, she believes it is not really a fresh start, but "an extension and continuation of September's tearful and desperate "Cry for You"."

== Track listing ==
Inferno track listing
No.	Title	Writer(s)	Length
1.	"Easy Come, Easy Go"	Saska Becker; Daniel Ledinsky	3:57
2.	"Sanningen"	Joakim Berg	3:41
3.	"Nummer"	Becker; Ledinsky; Petra Marklund; Richard Wrede	4:44
4.	"Förlorad värld"	Becker; Ledinsky; Marklund	5:00
5.	"Kom tillbaks"	Becker; Ledinsky; Marklund	3:30
6.	"Fred"	Becker; Berg; Ledinsky; Marklund	3:18
7.	"Aska i vinden"	Becker; Berg; Ledinsky	3:20
8.	"Vad som helst"	Becker; Ledinsky; Marklund	3:21
9.	"Krig"	Becker; Ledinsky; Marklund	3:48
10.	"Händerna mot himlen"	Berg	4:00
11.	"Svarta moln"	Becker; Ledinsky; Marklund	3:38
Total length:			42:19

== Personnel ==
Credits adapted from liner notes.

- Petra Marklund – vocals, songwriter (3-6, 8, 9, 11)
- Daniel Ledinsky – producer, recording, instruments, songwriter (1, 3-9, 11)
- Saska Becker – producer, recording, instruments, songwriter (1, 3-9, 11)
- Joakim Berg – guitar (6, 7, 10), songwriter (2, 6, 7, 10)
- Richard Wrede – songwriter (3)
- Lasse Mårtén – mixing
- Salem Al Fakir – co-producer (4), guitar (4), bass (4), keyboards (4)
- Beatrice Eli – extra choir (8)
- Henrik Jonsson – mastering
- Anna Ledin Wirén – photography
- Karl-Magnus Boske – design

== Charts ==
=== Weekly charts ===
Weekly chart performance for Inferno
Chart (2012)	Peak position
Swedish Albums (Sverigetopplistan)	1

=== Year-end charts ===
Year-end chart performance for Inferno
Chart (2012)	Position
Swedish Albums (Sverigetopplistan)	12
Chart (2013)	Position
Swedish Albums (Sverigetopplistan)	40

== Certifications ==
Region	Certification	Certified units/sales
Sweden (GLF)	Platinum	40,000^{‡}
^{‡} Sales+streaming figures based on certification alone.
