= Black September (disambiguation) =

Black September was the conflict fought in Jordan between the JAF and the PLO primarily in September 1970.

Black September may also refer to:

- Black September Organization, a Palestinian militant organization
- Black September (comics), a reboot of Malibu Comics' Ultraverse
- Suai Church massacre, also referred to as the Black September massacre (Portuguese: Massacre Setembro Negro), a 1999 massacre in Timor-Leste
