= Händerna mot himlen =

Single by Petra Marklund

from the album Inferno
- Released: 14 September 2012
- Recorded: 2012
- Studio: Music & Words (Stockholm)
- Genre: Pop
- Length: 3:57
- Label: Razzia Records/Family Tree
- Songwriter: Joakim Berg
- Producers: Daniel Ledinsky; Saska Becker

Petra Marklund singles chronology
| "Hands Up" (2012) | "Händerna mot himlen" (2012) | "Sanningen" (2013) |

Music video
- "Händerna mot himlen" on YouTube

"Händerna mot himlen" (Hands towards the sky) is a song by Swedish singer-songwriter Petra Marklund, which was chosen as the lead single from her fifth studio album Inferno (2012). The song was released digitally on 14 September 2012, and is recorded in her native language Swedish. The song also is her first single to be released under her birth name Petra Marklund rather than her stage name September.

== Background and release ==
In July 2012, Petra Marklund announced on her website that she is in a studio recording her debut Swedish studio album. The album was released on 17 October 2012. She stated "I am both pleased and a little excited to finally release this album".

In an interview with Dn.se, she officially confirmed that her next album would be under her birth name and that this studio album would depart from her signature Eurodance style. She said the tone would be "dark and personal".

On 10 September, ScandiPop.co.uk had premiered the song on their website.

== Composition ==
It was written by the songwriter Joakim Berg. Musically, the song is pop-influenced, with Europop beats. However, the song features strong strings accompaniment, including violins, violas and cellos. Sony Music said the song was "more personal and sad than before".

== Music video ==
The music video premiered on Aftonbladet. It featured Marklund walking around Sweden and skydiving from a plane.

== Charts ==
=== Weekly charts ===
Weekly chart performance for "Händerna mot himlen"
| Chart (2012) | Peak position |
|---|---|
| Sweden (Sverigetopplistan) | 2 |
| Chart (2026) | Position |
| Norway (VG-lista) | 7 |

=== Year-end charts ===
Year-end chart performance for "Händerna mot himlen"
| Chart (2012) | Position |
|---|---|
| Sweden (Sverigetopplistan) | 31 |
