= Settembre =

Settembre (Italian for 'September') may refer to:

- September (2022 film), 2022 Italian film originally titled Settembre
- Settembre (singer) (born 2001), Italian singer-songwriter
