= Love CPR =

Studio album by September
- Released: 14 February 2011
- Length: 69:05 (digital edition)
- Label: Catchy Tunes
- Producer: Daniel Alexander; Saska Becker; Niklas Bergwall; Jonas von der Burg; Cutfather; Daniel Davidsen; Jake; Jonas Jeberg; Erik Lewander; Naiv; Stefan Olsson; Jaakko Salovaara; Patric Sarin; Lucas Secon; StoneBridge; Didrik Thott; Sebastian Thott; Peter Wallevik

September chronology
Cry for You – The Album (2009)	Love CPR (2011)	Inferno (2012)

Singles from Love CPR
- 1. "Mikrofonkåt" Released: 12 November 2010; 2. "Resuscitate Me" Released: 19 November 2010; 3. "Me & My Microphone" Released: 11 February 2011; 4. "Party in My Head" Released: 11 July 2011; 5. "Hands Up" Released: 25 September 2012

Love CPR is the fourth studio album by Swedish singer-songwriter Petra Marklund under the alias September. It was released digitally on 14 February 2011 in Sweden by Catchy Tunes, with a physical release two days later. Producers that worked on the album include Jonas von der Burg, who worked with September on almost all of her songs, StoneBridge, Lucas Secon, Cutfather and Jaakko Salovaara of Darude fame. The album was mastered by Björn Engelmann at Cutting Room Studios. It received generally positive reviews from critics, with many calling it more pop than her previous work. The album debuted at number one on the Swedish Albums Chart and was eventually certified double platinum in Sweden for shipments of 80,000 copies.

The lead single "Mikrofonkåt" was released in Sweden on 12 November 2010, debuting and peaking at number one on the Swedish Top 60 Singles chart, while staying in the position for 11 consecutive weeks. The subsequent single "Resuscitate Me" was released on 19 November 2010. The album's first international single, and English language version of "Mikrofonkåt" titled "Me & My Microphone", was released 11 February 2011 in Sweden as a promotional single, with a later date for the rest of the world. "Party in My Head" was the subsequent single in Sweden, while "Hands Up" was released as the third single in the United States.

== Composition ==
The album's first track and future sixth single, "Party in My Head", has been described as a club friendly, crowd-pleasing affair. Written by Wayne Hector, Lucas Secon, Daniel Davidsen, Peter Wallevik, Mich Hansen, the track has been compared to songs from Barbadian singer Rihanna's new album Loud. The second single, "Resuscitate Me", is an "arms in the air", floor-filler with "irresistible synth riffs", "infectious choruses", and mid-tempo verses, all leading up to an explosive electro-lite pop chorus. Written and produced by Lucas Secon and Cutfather, who produced Kylie Minogue's "Get Outta My Way", Jonas Jeberg and Wayne Hector, the track follows a more pop and electronic sound compared to her previous works. The Jonas von der Burg, Niklas von der Burg, and Anoo Bhagavan written and former of the three produced "Something's Going On" has been criticized for its over use of auto-tune, but has received positive reception for its ATB-esque vibes.

The album's fourth track "Intimate Connection" was written by September, Naiv, Jake, Marcellus and was produced by Naiv. The song follows a "schlager-pop" sound, with a "la, la, la" chorus, with September's vocals being compared to those of Cher. The fifth track, "Heat is Rising", was written by Patric Sarin, Marklund, Jaakko Salovaara, and Sharon Vaughn and produced by Patric and Jaako. "Walk Away", the album's only ballad, was written by Christian Fast, September, Didrik Thott, and Sebastian Thott, with Didrik and Sebastian as producers. The Fast, September, D. Thott, S. Thott written and Didrik and Sebastian produced, "Ricochet", has a more electropop edge than the rest of the album, giving it a more modern sound. "Hands Up" was penned by Fast, D. Thott, Bergwall, September, with production from Bergwall. The track is a club anthem, with euphoric vocals, large synths, and instrumental breakdowns. The Thomas Rusiak, Bergwall, Petter Alexis, September, and Daniel Alexander written first international and third Swedish single, "Me & My Microphone", as well as its Swedish counterpart, "Mikrofonkåt", provides a change in direction from the rest of the album. Both songs have been praised for their bass lines and lyrical creativity.

The track "Music" was written by September, Naiv, and Karl Johan Råsmark with production from Naiv. The electro-disco track uses "sparkling synths" to create an ode to music. "My Emergency, written by Sarin, September, Salovaara, Fast, D. Thott and produced by Salovaara and Sarin, has been described as "sublime" and is a favorite among critics. "Walk Alone" was written by J. Burg, N. Burg, Bhagavan and features production from the former of the three. The song has been described as "impressive, bittersweet, electro stomper featuring some gorgeous twinkling piano chords and a surprisingly powerful heartache of a melody." "White Flag", written by September, Erik Lewander, Hayden Bell, Hayley Aitken, Iggy Strange-Dahl, and Sarah Lundbäck-Bell and produced by Lewander and StoneBridge, has been called a "messy attempt at techno-fused R&B." The final English track, "Bump and Grind", is another club-friendly track from the album. The track has a "provocatively heavy bassline, "elongated synths", and "balearic" verses. The five Swedish tracks from the album, "Baksmälla", "Kärlekens tunga", "Mikrofonkåt", "Vem ska jag tro på" and "Teddybjörnen Fredriksson", offer a change to the rest of the album. "Vem ska jag tro på" and "Teddybjörnen Fredriksson" are both acoustic ballads, while "Baksmälla" is a "seductive slice of dirty electro house."

== Critical reception ==
Professional ratings
Review scores
Source	Rating
AllMusic	3.5/5 stars

Love CPR received mostly positive reviews from music critics. ScandiPop gave the album an early review, stating "...it's sounding incredible so far. The production is goosebump inducing, the melodies are magical, and the vocals are fantastic. The emphasis is on a clubbier direction, but everything about it is still very pop." AllMusic gave the album a generally good music review, giving the album three and a half out of five stars, praising the disco and trance-pop sound of the album, comparing it to Kylie Minogue and Cascada. Natalie Bosman of The Citizen rated the album six out of 10, praising the club-friendly tracks saying "blends dancey club tracks with catchy pop tunes to make for a very accessible and easily palatable final product." Bosman also praised it for going more pop oriented saying "Love CPR sees more of a focus on the pop side of her music than ever before". Dan Nishimoto from Prefix magazine gave it a positive review, saying "Robyn may have the current requisite-Swedish-pop-star slot in American taste-maker playlists, but dance-pop singer September is gunning for a more populist arena."

Due to the success of the album, she embarked on a promotional tour across Europe in support the album.

== Singles ==
"Mikrofonkåt" was released 12 November 2010 as the first single from the album, released as a digital download. The song had previously been performed on Swedish reality show Så mycket bättre before September announced it would be released as the first single from Love CPR. "Mikrofonkåt" is a cover by the song of the same name by fellow Swedish rapper Petter. The song was released in Sweden and received positive reviews from music critics. The song became September's most successful single to date in Sweden and her only single to chart at number one, as the single debuted at number one for 11 consecutive weeks. The song was successful, being certificated four-times platinum. The song is listed at being inside the Top 25 songs of Sweden's 'Best of All Time'. As of 22 February, the song has reached 8× Platinum status. "Resuscitate Me" was released as the second single from the album. The single was later released digitally on 19 November 2010. It was released as the first international single. The single was officially released in Australia and New Zealand in mid-March 2011. The song did not attain the same success as her previous single, as it peaked at number 45 in her home country, but generated radio airplay in Australasia. September's US dance label Robbins Entertainment announced that they will be releasing the English version of "Mikrofonkåt", which is "Me & My Microphone". The single was released on 12 February 2011 in Belgium. It was released as a CD single in Sweden three days after and was released in the United States on 12 April 2011. The song peaked at number forty-one on Belgium (Wallonia) Charts. She performed the song live on Skavlan. The music video for the single was released in October 2011, the same time for the release of "Party in My Head". "Party in My Head" was released as the sixth single from the album. It was announced that it will be only released in Sweden as the third single, while Resuscitate Me and Me & My Microphone was released worldwide. The song was released in Sweden on 11 July 2011. On 15 July 2011, the song debuted at 60 on the Swedish charts and has so far peaked at 32. The music video for "Party in My Head" was released in October 2011. September's US record label Robbins Entertainment announced to release "Hands Up" as the second single in the US. It was critically praised from critics, mostly highlighting it as an album standout. It was expected to release, however because she started recording her fifth studio album, the song was cancelled. However, on 12 September 2012, her record label announced they would continue the release of the single in the US. The song was released on 25 September.

=== Promotional singles ===
Two songs, which were released as promotional singles, charted and generated airplay success in September's native Sweden. "Kärlekens tunga" was sent to radios in March 2011. It debuted at number 60 in Sweden, and peaked at number six the following week. "Baksmälla", a collaboration with rapper Petter, was released as a joint single on 8 December 2010 and peaked at number three in Sweden.

== Track listing ==
Scandinavian edition
No.	Title	Writer(s)	Producer(s)	Length
1.	"Party in My Head"	Wayne Hector; Lucas Secon; Daniel Davidsen; Peter Wallevik; Mich Hansen	Cutfather; Davidsen; Wallevik; Secon	4:18
2.	"Resuscitate Me"	Hector; Secon; Jonas Jeberg; Cutfather	Jeberg; Cutfather	3:17
3.	"Something's Going On"	Jonas von der Burg; Anoo Bhagavan; Niclas von der Burg	J. von der Burg	3:07
4.	"Intimate Connection"	Petra Marklund; Naiv; Jake; Marcellus	Naiv; Jake (co-)	3:35
5.	"Heat Rising"	Sarin; Marklund; Jaakko Salovaara; Sharon Vaughn	Salovaara; Sarin	3:55
6.	"Walk Away"	Christian Fast; Marklund; Didrik Thott; Sebastian Thott	S. Thott; D. Thott	3:52
7.	"Ricochet"	Fast; Marklund; D. Thott; S. Thott	S. Thott; D. Thott	2:54
8.	"Hands Up"	Fast; D. Thott; Niklas Bergwall; Marklund	Bergwall	3:36
9.	"Me & My Microphone"	Bergwall; Marklund; Daniel Alexander; Thomas Rusiak; Petter Alexis	Bergwall	2:45
10.	"Music"	Marklund; Naiv; Karl Johan Råsmark	Naiv	3:48
11.	"My Emergency"	Sarin; Marklund; Salovaara; Fast; D. Thott	Salovaara; Sarin	3:38
12.	"Walk Alone"	J. von der Burg; Bhagavan; N. von der Burg	J. von der Burg	2:51
13.	"White Flag"	Marklund; Erik Lewander; Hayden Bell; Hayley Aitken; Iggy Strange Dahl; Sarah Lundbäck-Bell	Lewander; StoneBridge (add.)	3:04
14.	"Bump and Grind"	J. von der Burg; Bhagavan; N. von der Burg	J. von der Burg	4:16
15.	"Baksmälla" (featuring Petter)	Alexander; Marklund; Alexis; Saska Becker	Becker; Alexander	3:37
16.	"Kärlekens tunga"	Plura Jonsson	Bergwall	3:10
17.	"Mikrofonkåt"	Alexis; Rusiak	Bergwall	2:46
18.	"Vem ska jag tro på"	Thomas Di Leva	Stefan Olsson	3:29
19.	"Teddybjörnen Fredriksson"	Lars Berghagen	Olsson	4:06
Total length:				66:08

Scandinavian digital edition bonus track
No.	Title	Writer(s)	Producer(s)	Length
20.	"Nobody Knows"	J. von der Burg; Bhagavan; N. von der Burg	J. von der Burg	2:57
Total length:				69:05

Notes

- The international version of the album includes only the first 14 tracks, with the inclusion of the bonus track "Nobody Knows". This is the case for the United States and Canadian edition, however it excludes the bonus track.

== Charts ==
=== Weekly charts ===
Weekly chart performance for Love CPR
Chart (2011)	Peak position
Finnish Albums (Suomen virallinen lista)	26
Swedish Albums (Sverigetopplistan)	1

=== Year-end charts ===
Year-end chart performance for Love CPR
Chart (2011)	Position
Swedish Albums (Sverigetopplistan)	4

== Certifications ==
Certifications for Love CPR
Region	Certification	Certified units/sales
Sweden (GLF)	2× Platinum	80,000^{‡}
^{‡} Sales+streaming figures based on certification alone.

== Release history ==
Release history and formats for Love CPR
Region	Date	Format	Label	Ref.
Scandinavia	14 February 2011	Digital download	Catchy Tunes	
Scandinavia	16 February 2011	CD	Catchy Tunes	
Poland	25 February 2011	CD	Magic	
United States	5 July 2011	CD; digital download	Robbins	
New Zealand	10 September 2011	Digital download	Central Station	
