= Resuscitate Me =

Single by September

from the album Love CPR
- Released: 19 November 2010
- Genre: Dance-pop
- Length: 3:17
- Label: Family Tree
- Songwriters: Wayne Hector, Lucas Secon, Cutfather, Jonas Jeberg
- Producers: Jonas Jeberg, Cutfather

September singles chronology
"Mikrofonkåt" (2010)	"Resuscitate Me" (2010)	"Party in My Head" (2011)

"Resuscitate Me" is a dance-pop song by Swedish pop recording artist September from her fourth studio album, Love CPR. It was released in Scandinavia on 19 November 2010 and in Australia on 26 March 2011. It was written by Wayne Hector, Lucas Secon, Cutfather and Jonas Jeberg, and produced by Jeberg and Cutfather.

== Critical reception ==
"Resuscitate Me" received positive reviews from music critics, with many calling it September's comeback single. ScandiPop stated, "It's fantastic. And we can’t imagine any fan of September's previous output being disappointed by this. To our ears, it's up there with her best. It's the perfect return to form that we all wanted from her." Jon O'Brien from AllMusic said, "'Resuscitate Me' is a glorious 'arms in the air' floor-filler, whose minimal melancholic opening builds up to a crescendo of epic soaring strings, irresistible synth riffs, and not just one, but two infectious choruses, which sound like Katy Perry's 'Firework' and David Guetta's 'When Love Takes Over' have collided into one uplifting monster of a tune."

== Chart performance ==
The song peaked at number 45 on Swedish singles chart and remained on the charts for two weeks.

== Music video ==
The music video was directed by Patric Ullaeus, who has also directed videos with Ace of Base, Dilba, A Touch of Class and Within Temptation. In the video, September dies in a hospital, then returns as a ghost to watch over her boyfriend. She is shown dancing in Heaven and lying on a bed with her boyfriend. At the end of the video, she is defibrillated back to life and reunites with her boyfriend.

== Track listing ==
- Digital download
1. "Resuscitate Me" (Radio Edit) – 3:18
2. "Resuscitate Me" (Extended Mix) – 5:58
3. "Resuscitate Me" (Buzz Junkies Radio Edit) – 3:39
4. "Resuscitate Me" (Buzz Junkies Club Remix) – 6:08
5. "Resuscitate Me" (Moto Blanco Radio Edit) – 3:27
6. "Resuscitate Me" (Moto Blanco Club Remix) – 8:28

== Release history ==
Region	Date	Format	Label
Sweden	14 February 2011	Digital download	Catchy Tunes
New Zealand	26 March 2011	Digital download	Catchy Tunes
Australia	26 March 2011	Digital download	Catchy Tunes

== Charts ==
Chart (2010–2011)	Peak position
Slovakia Airplay (ČNS IFPI)	78
Sweden (Sverigetopplistan)	45
