= September All Over =

Single by September

from the album September
- Released: 18 February 2004
- Genre: Dance-pop; Europop
- Length: 3:47
- Label: Stockholm
- Songwriters: Jonas von der Burg; Anoo Bhagavan; Niclas von der Burg
- Producer: Jonas von der Burg

September singles chronology
"We Can Do It" (2003)	"September All Over" (2004)	"Satellites" (2005)

"September All Over" is the third single by Swedish singer and songwriter Petra Marklund, then known as September from her debut studio album September. It was released on 18 February 2004, one week after the release of the album. "September All Over" entered the Swedish singles chart on 27 February 2004 at the position of #15, peaked at #8 in its second week, and remained on the charts for 10 weeks. A new UK Radio Edit of the song was included on September's UK debut album, Cry for You – The Album, in 2009.

== Track listing ==
- CD single and digital download
1. "September All Over" (Radio Version) – 3:47
2. "September All Over" (Extended Version) – 6:10
3. "September All Over" (The Jackal Vocal Clubmix (Short Edit)) – 3:53
4. "September All Over" (The Jackal Vocal Clubmix (Long Edit)) – 6:56

== Charts ==
=== Weekly charts ===
Chart (2004)	Peak position
Romania (Romanian Top 100)	14
Sweden (Sverigetopplistan)	8

=== Year-end charts ===
Chart (2004)	Position
Romania (Romanian Top 100)	46
