= We Can Do It (September song) =

Single by September

from the album September
- Released: 3 November 2003
- Genre: Dance-pop; europop
- Length: 3:38
- Label: Stockholm
- Songwriters: Sigidi; Harold Clayton; Jonas von der Burg; Anoo Bhagavan; Niclas von der Burg
- Producer: Jonas von der Burg

September singles chronology
"La La La (Never Give It Up)" (2003)	"We Can Do It" (2003)	"September All Over" (2004)

"We Can Do It" is the second single by Swedish singer and songwriter Petra Marklund, credited under her former stage name September from her debut studio album September. The song contains elements from "Take Your Time (Do It Right)" by American R&B group The S.O.S. Band, written by Sigidi and Harold Clayton. "We Can Do It" peaked at #10 on the Swedish singles chart. A new UK Radio Edit of the song was included on September's UK debut album, Cry for You – The Album, in 2009.

== Track listing ==
- CD single and digital download
1. "We Can Do It" (Radio Version) – 3:38
2. "We Can Do It" (Extended Version) – 5:17
3. "We Can Do It" (Candido's Electro Short Cut) – 3:29
4. "We Can Do It" (Candido's Electro 12" Cut) – 5:03

== Charts ==
Chart (2003–2004)	Peak position
Romania (Romanian Top 100)	70
Sweden (Sverigetopplistan)	10
