= Ensam inte stark =

Studio album by Petra Marklund
- Released: 13 November 2015
- Genre: Pop; electronica
- Length: 41:04
- Language: Swedish
- Label: Razzia
- Producer: Michel Petré; Joakim Berg; Simon Sigfridsson; Jonas Quant; Björn Hallberg; Astma & Rocwell

Petra Marklund chronology
Inferno (2012)	Ensam inte stark (2015)	Frimärken (2021)

Singles from Ensam inte stark
- 1. "Som du bäddar" Released: 18 September 2015; 2. "Kidz" Released: 21 January 2016; 3. "Alla känner apan (Hanzén Remix)" Released: 20 May 2016

Ensam inte stark is the second Swedish-language studio album by Swedish singer-songwriter Petra Marklund. It was released on 13 November 2015 by Razzia Records and is the follow-up to Platinum-certified album Inferno.

== Background ==
In May 2015, before Marklund's second summer as the host of Swedish sing-along show Allsång på Skansen, the single "Det som händer i Göteborg (Stannar i Göteborg)" was released. Whilst the artwork of the single is similar to the album design, the song was not featured on Ensam inte stark.

== Track listing ==
Ensam inte stark track listing
No.	Title	Writer(s)	Producer(s)	Length
1.	"Ensam är inte stark"	Petra Marklund; Joakim Berg; Simon Sigfridsson	Berg; Sigfridsson	3:42
2.	"Som du bäddar"	Marklund; Berg; Sigfridsson	Berg; Jonas Quant; Sigfridsson	4:00
3.	"Gråta i neon"	Marklund; Ludwig Bell	Hallberg	3:40
4.	"Du"	Marklund; Berg; Sigfridsson	Berg; Sigfridsson	4:06
5.	"Slowmotion"	Marklund; Berg; Sigfridsson	Berg; Sigfridsson	4:03
6.	"Täcket"	Marklund; Berg; Michel Flygare; Tobias Jimson	Astma & Rocwell	3:18
7.	"Alla känner apan"	Marklund; Berg; Flygare; Jimson	Astma & Rocwell	3:02
8.	"Vilda fåglar"	Marklund; Berg; Sigfridsson	Berg; Sigfridsson	3:35
9.	"Vem vänder vindarna"	Marklund; Bell; Björn Hallberg	Hallberg	3:23
10.	"Kidz" (featuring Linnea Henriksson)	Marklund; Bell; Henriksson; Fredrik Swahn	Hallberg	4:34
11.	"Love"	Marklund; Berg; Sigfridsson	Berg; Sigfridsson	3:33
Total length:				41:04

== Charts ==
=== Weekly charts ===
Weekly chart performance for Ensam inte stark
Chart (2015)	Peak position
Swedish Albums (Sverigetopplistan)	11
