= Party in My Head (September song) =

Single by September

from the album Love CPR
- Released: 11 July 2011
- Genre: Dance-pop
- Length: 3:50
- Label: Catchy Tunes
- Songwriter(s): Wayne Hector, Lucas Secon, Daniel Davidsen, Peter Wallevik
- Producer(s): Lucas Secon, Cutfather, Daniel Davidsen, Peter Wallevik

September singles chronology
"Resuscitate Me" (2010)	"Party in My Head" (2011)	"Hands Up" (2012)

"Party in My Head" is a song by Swedish artist September. It's the second single from her fourth studio album Love CPR. It was released in Sweden on 11 July 2011 and in the US on 27 September 2011.

== Background writing ==
The song was written by Wayne Hector, Lucas Secon, Daniel Davidsen, Peter Wallevik, and was produced by Lucas Secon, Cutfather, Daniel Davidsen, Peter Wallevik. The song was originally presented to Britney Spears for her album Femme Fatale, but rejected.

== Critical reception ==
"Party In My Head" received favorable reviews from most music critics. ScandiPop had compared the track a lot to Australian pop singer Kylie Minogue's singles Wow and Get Outta My Way. They said "it’s one of the best, simply because we love the message." Allmusic compared the song to Rihanna's work with Loud. They said it "is the kind of crowd-pleasing, punchy and club-friendly".

== Chart performance ==
Currently, the song debuted at number sixty on the Swedish singles chart on the issue date of 15 July 2011. After one week on the charts, it rose to number thirty-two. Its currently stayed in the charts for nine weeks. The song was mildly successful in the United States reaching a peak of 17 on the U.S iTunes Dance Charts.

== Music video ==
The music video started filming on 18 July 2011 and was directed by Patric Ullaeus. The music video will be released when the single "Me and My Microphone" is released, which was announced by September on her Twitter account.

== Track listing ==
- Digital download
1. "Party in My Head" (Radio Edit) – 3:50
2. "Party in My Head" (Extended) – 5:48
3. "Party in My Head" (Adam Rickfors Remix) – 3:40
4. "Party in My Head" (Adam Rickfors Extended Remix) – 7:05
5. "Party in My Head" (Punchy Remix) – 3:54
6. "Party in My Head" (Punchy Extended Remix) – 5:47
7. "Party in My Head" (Coucheron Remix) - 4:13
8. "Party in My Head" (Coucheron Extended Remix) - 6:15

== Charts ==
Chart (2011)	Peak position
Sweden (Sverigetopplistan)	32
US Dance/Mix Show Airplay (Billboard)	17
