= La La La (Never Give It Up) =

Single by September

from the album September
- Released: 2 June 2003
- Genre: Dance-pop; europop
- Length: 3:18
- Label: Stockholm
- Songwriters: Jonas von der Burg; Anoo Bhagavan; Niclas von der Burg
- Producer: Jonas von der Burg

September singles chronology
"La La La (Never Give It Up)" (2003)	"We Can Do It" (2003)

"La La La (Never Give It Up)" is the debut single by Swedish singer and songwriter September. It was released on 2 June 2003 on Stockholm Records and is featured on September's self-titled debut album, released in 2004. "La La La (Never Give It Up)" peaked at No. 8 on the Swedish single chart. As of December 2007, it is ranked as No. 653 on Best place of all time on the Swedish charts.

== Track listing ==
- CD single
1. "La La La (Never Give It Up)" (Radio Version) – 3:18
2. "La La La (Never Give It Up)" (Extended Version) – 5:52
- CD maxi-single and digital download
1. "La La La (Never Give It Up)" (Radio Version) – 3:18
2. "La La La (Never Give It Up)" (Extended Version) – 5:52
3. "La La La (Never Give It Up)" (Soulful Disco Mix Short) – 3:24
4. "La La La (Never Give It Up)" (Soulful Disco Mix Long) – 5:07

== Charts ==
=== Weekly charts ===
Chart (2003–2004)	Peak position
CIS Airplay (TopHit)	3
Romania (Romanian Top 100)	7
Russia Airplay (TopHit)	1
Sweden (Sverigetopplistan)	8

=== Year-end charts ===
Chart (2003)	Position
CIS (TopHit)	15
Romania (Romanian Top 100)	98
Russia Airplay (TopHit)	45
Sweden (Sverigetopplistan)	66
Chart (2004)	Position
CIS (TopHit)	86
Russia Airplay (TopHit)	76
