= Cry for You (September song) =

2006 single by September

Single by September

from the album In Orbit
- Released: 29 November 2006
- Genre: Dance-pop; Europop; house
- Length: 3:30
- Label: Catchy Tunes
- Songwriters: Jonas von der Burg; Anoo Bhagavan; Niclas von der Burg
- Producer: Jonas von der Burg

September singles chronology
"Looking for Love" (2005)	"Cry for You" (2006)	"Can't Get Over" (2007)

Alternative cover
- UK cover

Audio sample
- file; help

"Cry for You" (released as "Cry for You (You'll Never See Me Again)" on the Hard2Beat record label) is a song by Swedish singer Petra Marklund, performing as September, from her second studio album In Orbit (2005). It was released in Sweden on 29 November 2006 as the third and final single from the album. The single version was also included on her third studio album Dancing Shoes (2007) as a bonus track, and it was released as a single from her various compilation albums that were released in Europe. Musically, "Cry for You" is a dance-pop and euro-pop track, with its lyrics being about getting out of a relationship.

Commercially, "Cry for You" was considered September's biggest hit to date, along with her single "Satellites", peaking in the top ten in twelve countries, including Sweden, Ireland, and the United Kingdom, while also charting in nine different countries. In the United States, the song spent three weeks atop the Billboard Hot Dance Airplay chart in May 2007 and became September's first and only entry on the Billboard Hot 100 as of 2026, peaking at number 74 in 2008. "Cry for You" was certified Gold by the RIAA in November 2010 for sales of over 500,000 copies. In late 2018, the song regained popularity after the song was turned into a meme on Twitter, using its "you'll never see me again" lyrics.

== Composition and release ==
Before the worldwide release in 2007, September had originally recorded the song for her studio album In Orbit (2005). However, in many compilations September has released, the song has appeared on her compilations including September, Dancing in Orbit, Gold and Cry for You – The Album.

According to September, she explained the reason why she wanted to release it worldwide, by saying "The song was so strong by itself. And I've been there and it feels like the fans are starved of dance music. But now dance music is coming back again, and the world is getting smaller and smaller because of the internet – that now sometimes you don't even have to do much promotion, although obviously it is still very important. But I think that a hit song will always find a way."

In an interview with Digital Spy, they asked about the background of the song, when she replied:

"It's about when you're done with relationship. A lot of people write to me and say 'It's really emotional and I feel so much for the song because my boyfriend la la la', which is really nice for me, even though I didn't write the lyrics. I've had a lot of experiences like that so that's what gives me the nerve to sing it."

The song features a dance-pop, Europop and house sound and has been compared to Bronski Beat's "Smalltown Boy" and its sampled counterpart, "Tell Me Why" by Supermode, although possible similarities have been declared unintended.

== Critical reception ==
"Cry for You" received positive reviews from music critics. Nick Levine from Digital Spy awarded the song with four stars out of five, giving it a positive review. He stated "[...] it's a surprisingly affecting Eurodance number, a record that's both relentlessly danceable and desperately sad" and said its "actually a pretty decent record." However, he felt the song was not "original" enough to outbet releases by fellow Swedish singer Robyn. Popjustice said the song is a "massive balls-out club anthem and we think it works rather well." Ben Norman from About.com called the song the "Best Dance Crossover Track", while saying "Robbins [Entertainment] has since made peace with me by backing and promoting Swedish singer September and this Europop confection. Good job guys!."

AllMusic had rated the song three-and-a-half-stars out of five stars. K. Ross Hoffman, also from AllMusic, had highlighted the song as an album standout, and said "'Cry [for You]' is the obvious standout, managing to conjure both sophistication and a surprising degree of emotion from its fairly pedestrian frothy electro-pop arrangement and polished but powerful vocal turn." However, he also added "'Cry for You' is a strong enough track (though fairly faceless too, in its way) [...]." PopBytes.com gave it a positive review, saying it's "total pop dance fluff but highly enjoyable."

== Chart performance ==
On the issue date of 30 August 2008, the song debuted at number 94 on the U.S. Billboard Hot 100 after spending eight weeks on the Bubbling Under chart; it peaked at number 74 on the former. "Cry for You" went on to other popular countdowns in the U.S. after its re-release in 2008, such as charting for three weeks in October on American Top 40.

In the UK and Ireland, "Cry for You" was released in April 2008 on the Hard2Beat Records label, a subsidiary of Ministry of Sound, in a new remix with a new video. The remixed version entered the UK Singles Chart at number nine, and later climbed to number five, following release of a physical single for the song. On 28 December 2008, the UK Singles Chart had this as number thirty-five for the top songs of 2008.

In France, "Cry for You" topped the airplay chart and debuted at number six on the singles chart. The song debuted in Switzerland at number thirteen, next week it moved at number seven on downloads alone. It debuted at number sixteen in Germany and peaked at number eleven. In the Netherlands the song was a huge success too, peaking at number four and staying in the top forty for twenty-one weeks. In Europe the song peaked at number fifteen on the European Hot 100 Singles.

In Australia, the original single version was released to radio, rather than the shorter UK remix (although the UK remix has been played several times on Australian radio). The song debuted at number nineteen on 10 August 2008 and peaked at number fourteen. In New Zealand airplay and official charts, the song debuted at number thirty-nine on the issue date of 22 September 2008.

"Cry for You" was certified gold for shipment of over 500,000 copies by the Recording Industry Association of America in 2010. The song was listed at number five on the Top 100 Club Chart Year-End result.

== Music video ==
Two music videos were released for the single. The international version features a futuristic city inside a large solitary building with a purple background. Inside are hundreds of clones dressed in black latex catsuits who are marching in unison, watched over by guards wearing white. September turns out to be one of the clones, and runs away from the rest, with the guards chasing her. The video is intercut with clips of September in the ‘city’, singing in a halterneck striped dress

The original video was a promotional video featuring September in a photoshoot, as it features on several covers of the singles CD cover formats. It is intercut with a short movie about a man in a hotel who meets a reporter that he begins a relationship with, and ends up marrying. There is a flash forward to his wife sitting at home alone worrying about their son, who is out at all-night parties, while the man is away working. At the end, it skips to the man and his wife at the beach, where they kiss. This version uses the original radio edit, while the UK video uses the UK mix of the song.

== Internet meme ==
Beginning in late 2018, "Cry for You" received renewed interest when it appeared in a popular meme format on Twitter. The meme juxtaposes a portion of the song's chorus, in which Marklund sings "you'll never see me again", with captions that ascribe the statement to entities such as socks that go missing after doing laundry, "Tumblr users after December 17th" (in reference to the site's ban on pornography), or "Lady Gaga to pop music after the gays [let] Artpop flop".

== Sampling ==
In 2022, the song was sampled by British singer and songwriter Charli XCX on her song "Beg for You" (featuring Rina Sawayama) from her album Crash.

== Track listings ==
- Swedish CD single (CATCHY054)
1. "Cry for You" (Single Edit) (3:30)
2. "Cry for You" (Radio Extended) (5:25)
3. "Cry for You" (Jackal Remix Short) (4:00)
4. "Cry for You" (Jackal Remix Long) (5:48)
- US CD single (72162)
1. "Cry for You" (Single Edit) (3:30)
2. "Cry for You" (Granite & Phunk Radio Edit) (3:33)
3. "Cry for You" (Jackal Remix Short) (4:00)
4. "Cry for You" (Radio Extended) (5:26)
5. "Cry for You" (Granite & Phunk Club Mix) (7:13)
6. "Cry for You" (Jackal Remix Long) (5:48)
- Dutch Digital single
1. "Cry for You" (Radio Edit) (3:30)
2. "Cry for You" (Radio Extended) (5:25)
3. "Cry for You" (Jackal Remix Short) (4:00)
4. "Cry for You" (Jackal Remix Long) (5:48)
5. "Cry for You" (Jaydee Remix) (6:16)
- Dutch CD single (SAR 200702)
1. "Cry for You" (Single Edit) (3:30)
2. "Cry for You" (Radio Extended) (5:25)
3. "Cry for You" (Jackal Remix Short) (4:00)
4. "Cry for You" (video)
- UK Digital single
1. "Cry for You" (UK Radio Edit) (2:47)
- UK CD single (H2B03CDX)
1. "Cry for You" (UK Radio Edit) (2:45)
2. "Cry for You" (Original Edit) (2:46)
- UK CD maxi (H2B03CDS)
1. "Cry for You" (UK Radio Edit) (2:45)
2. "Cry for You" (Original Edit) (2:46)
3. "Cry for You" (Dave Ramone Extended Mix) (6:12)
4. "Cry for You" (Spencer & Hill Remix) (6:45)
5. "Cry for You" (Darren Styles Club Mix) (5:28)
6. "Cry for You" (Candlelight Edit) (3:06)
7. "Cry for You" (UK video)
- UK Limited Promo 12" Vinyl (H2B03P2LTD)
1. "Cry for You" (Bad Behaviour Remix) (6:46)
- Swedish CD single (CATCHY096) (Re-release)
1. "Cry for You" (UK Radio Edit) (2:45)
2. "Cry for You" (Original Edit) (2:46)
3. "Cry for You" (Dave Ramone Extended Mix) (6:12)
4. "Cry for You" (Spencer & Hill Remix) (6:45)
5. "Cry for You" (Darren Styles Club Mix) (5:28)
6. "Cry for You" (Candlelight Edit) (3:06)
- US Digital single
1. "Cry for You" (Exclusive New Mix) (3:56)
- Oceania Digital EP
1. "Cry for You" (Radio Edit) (3:29)
2. "Cry for You" (Extended) (5:25)
3. "Cry for You" (Spencer & Hill Remix) (6:45)
4. "Cry for You" (Darren Styles Club Mix) (5:28)
5. "Cry for You" (Dave Ramone Extended Mix) (6:12)
6. "Cry for You" (Jackal Remix) (5:49)
7. "Cry for You" (Candlelight Mix) (3:02)
8. "Satellites" (Acoustic Version) (3:03)
- AUS/NZ CD single (CRSCD50553)
1. "Cry for You" (Radio Edit) (3:30)
2. "Cry for You" (Extended) (5:25)
3. "Cry for You" (Spencer & Hill Remix) (6:45)
4. "Cry for You" (Darren Styles Club Mix) (5:28)
5. "Cry for You" (Dave Ramone Extended Remix) (6:12)
6. "Cry for You" (Jackal Remix) (5:49)
7. "Cry for You" (Candlelight Edit) (3:02)
- French Digital single
1. "Cry for You" (UK Radio Edit) (2:47)
2. "Cry for You" (Original Edit) (2:46)
3. "Cry for You" (Original Version) (3:30)
4. "Cry for You" (Acoustic Candlelight Edit) (3:06)
5. "Cry for You" (Dave Ramone Remix) (6:14)
6. "Cry for You" (Original Club Mix) (5:25)
7. "Cry for You" (Spencer Hill Remix) (6:17)
8. "Cry for You" (Spencer Hill Dub) (6:32)
9. "Cry for You" (Darren Styles Remix) (5:30)
- French CD single (AS 192 999-7)
1. "Cry for You" (UK Radio Edit) (2:47)
2. "Cry for You" (Original Version) (3:28)
3. "Cry for You" (Original Club Mix) (5:25)
4. "Cry for You" (Dave Ramone Remix) (6:14)
5. "Cry for You" (Acoustic Candlelight Edit) (3:06)
- German CD single (1782435)
1. "Cry for You" (UK Radio Edit) (2:47)
2. "Cry for You" (Spencer & Hill Radio Edit) (6:45)
3. "Cry for You" (Dave Ramone Extended Mix) (6:14)
4. "Cry for You" (Acoustic Candlelight Edit) (3:06)

== Charts ==
=== Weekly charts ===
Chart (2006–2009)	Peak position
Australia (ARIA)	14
Austria (Ö3 Austria Top 40)	7
Belgium (Ultratop 50 Flanders)	22
Belgium (Ultratop 50 Wallonia)	33
Canada (Canadian Hot 100)	33
CIS Airplay (TopHit)	10
Czech Republic Airplay (ČNS IFPI)	1
Denmark (Tracklisten)	10
Europe (European Hot 100 Singles)	15
Finland (Suomen virallinen lista)	13
France (SNEP)	6
Germany (GfK)	11
Hungary (Editors' Choice Top 40)	27
Ireland (IRMA)	8
Netherlands (Dutch Top 40)	4
Netherlands (Single Top 100)	10
New Zealand (Recorded Music NZ)	39
Romania (Romanian Top 100)	10
Russia Airplay (TopHit)	9
Scottish Singles Sales (Official Charts)	2
Slovakia Airplay (ČNS IFPI)	6
Sweden (Sverigetopplistan)	6
Switzerland (Schweizer Hitparade)	6
Ukraine Airplay (TopHit)	9
UK Singles (Official Charts)	5
UK Dance (Official Charts)	2
US Billboard Hot 100	74
US Hot Dance Airplay (Billboard)	1
US Pop Airplay (Billboard)	29

Chart (2025)	Peak position
Poland (Polish Airplay Top 100)	58

=== Year-end charts ===
Chart (2007)	Position
Sweden (Sverigetopplistan)	60
Romania (Romanian Top 100)	12
US Hot Dance Airplay (Billboard)	4

Chart (2008)	Position
Australia (ARIA)	57
Austria (Ö3 Austria Top 40)	70
CIS Airplay (TopHit)	31
Europe (European Hot 100 Singles)	37
France (SNEP)	51
Germany (Media Control GfK)	81
Netherlands (Dutch Top 40)	28
Netherlands (Single Top 100)	54
Russia Airplay (TopHit)	26
Switzerland (Schweizer Hitparade)	58
Ukraine Airplay (TopHit)	108
UK Singles (OCC)	35
US Pop 100 (Billboard)	99

Chart (2009)	Position
Austria (Ö3 Austria Top 40)	62

=== Decade-end charts ===
Decade-end chart performance for "Cry for You"
Chart (2000–2009)	Position
CIS Airplay (TopHit)	75
Russia Airplay (TopHit)	71

== Certifications ==
Region	Certification	Certified units/sales
Australia (ARIA)	Gold	35,000^{^}
Canada (Music Canada)	Gold	20,000^{*}
Denmark (IFPI Danmark)	Platinum	8,000^{^}
New Zealand (RMNZ)	Gold	15,000^{‡}
Sweden (GLF)	Gold	10,000^{^}
United Kingdom (BPI)	Gold	400,000^{‡}
United States (RIAA)	Gold	500,000^{*}
^{*} Sales figures based on certification alone.^{^} Shipments figures based on certification alone.^{‡} Sales+streaming figures based on certification alone.

== Release history ==
Country	Date	Format	Label
Sweden	29 November 2006	CD single, digital download	Catchy Tunes
United States	20 March 2007	CD single, digital download	Robbins Entertainment
United States	19 September 2007	Digital download (Exclusive New Mix)	Robbins Entertainment
United States	8 July 2008	Digital download (Exclusive New UK Remixes)	Robbins Entertainment
Poland	June 2007	Promo CD	Magic Records
Netherlands	4 October 2007	Digital download, CD single	Silver Angel Records
United Kingdom	14 April 2008	CD single, CD maxi, digital download	Hard2Beat
Europe	9 May 2008	CD single, CD maxi, digital download	Hard2Beat
Australia	2 August 2008	CD single, CD maxi, digital download	Central Station Records
France	18 August 2008	CD single, digital download	Universal Music France
Germany	26 September 2008	CD maxi, digital download	Universal Music
