= Because I Love You (September song) =

Promotional single by September

from the album Gold
- Released: 26 November 2008
- Genre: Dance-pop; Europop
- Length: 3:14 (album version); 3:18 (radio edit)
- Label: Catchy Tunes
- Songwriters: Jonas von der Burg; Anoo Bhagavan; Niclas von der Burg
- Producer: Jonas von der Burg

"Because I Love You" is a song by Swedish singer Petra Marklund (credited under the alias September) from her third studio album Dancing Shoes (2007). It was released on 26 November 2008 as a promotional single for Marklund's compilation album Gold. The single was also released in the Netherlands, on 13 July 2009, to promote her compilation album Dancing in Orbit.

== Track listing ==
- Scandinavian CD single and digital download
1. "Because I Love You" (Radio Edit) – 3:18
2. "Because I Love You" (Dave Ramone Radio Edit) – 2:46
3. "Because I Love You" (Radio Extended) – 5:37
4. "Because I Love You" (Clubmix Short) – 3:48
5. "Because I Love You" (Clubmix Extended) – 5:44
6. "Because I Love You" (Dave Ramone Extended) – 5:33
7. "Because I Love You" (Jazzy Candlelight) – 3:52

== Charts ==
Chart (2009)	Peak position
Czech Republic (Rádio – Top 100)	73
Sweden (Sverigetopplistan)	43
Slovakia (Rádio Top 100)	15

== Release history ==
Country	Date	Format
Scandinavia	26 November 2008	CD single; digital download
Netherlands	13 July 2009	CD single; digital download
