= Can't Get Over =

Single by September

from the album Dancing Shoes and September
- Released: 20 June 2007
- Recorded: 2006
- Genre: Dance-pop
- Length: 3:02
- Label: Catchy Tunes
- Songwriters: Anoo Bhagavan, Jonas von der Burg, Niklas von der Burg
- Producer: Jonas von der Burg

September singles chronology
"Cry for You" (2006)	"Can't Get Over" (2007)	"Until I Die" (2007)

Alternative covers
- US Re-release cover (UK Edit Remixes)

Alternative cover
- UK cover

Alternative cover
- French cover

"Can't Get Over" is a song by Swedish singer Petra Marklund, credited under her stage name September from her third studio album Dancing Shoes (2007). Written by Anoo Bhagavan, Jonas von der Burg and Niklas von der Burg, it was released on 20 June 2007 in Sweden as the lead single from the album. The song was also released as a single from Marklund's various compilations that were released internationally, with a new remix of the song was released in the UK on 9 March 2009 as the second single from Cry for You - The Album (2009). Commercially, "Can't Get Over" was a commercial success, peaking at five in Sweden and fourteen in the United Kingdom.

== Music videos ==
=== Promotional video ===
Two official music videos were released for the single. The first video was a promotional video which did not release officially through airplay and other charts. The video features September in a trouble relationship, the video also features promotional small snippets of her for the photoshoot of the covers.

=== New release video ===
The second video was released by Happy Music on their official YouTube page. The video was a second video and the track was edited as the UK Radio edit. The video featured September sporting a futuristic theme where she is driving a "flying" car, She then is in a white room, singing and dancing to the song. Throughout the rest of the video, she goes to a dark room in which she rescues her boyfriend, as he is trapped in a laser fence. The video ends where she and her boyfriend drive away, and the police force follow them after it fades black. Her birthday is lightly referenced in the video. This version was released worldwide as the official video for the single.

== Chart performance ==
Professional ratings
Review scores
Source	Rating
Digital Spy	3/5 stars

"Can't Get Over" received some success throughout the globe. The song debuted at number fourteen on the UK Singles Chart, and fell to ninety-four after six weeks. The song debuted at number fourteen in the Swedish Singles Chart on 28 June 2007. The song peaked at number five after five weeks in the charts. The song peaked at number twelve on the US Billboard Hot Dance Airplay.

The song received more limited success throughout Oceania. The song had debuted and peaked at number forty-one on the Australian Singles Chart. The song however did not chart in New Zealand's RIANZ charts, it did chart on New Zealand Official Airplay. The song peaked at number thirty-three on the charts.

The single was successful elsewhere. It peaked at number thirty-five in the Netherlands, number ten in Finland and number forty-one in Belgium.

== Track listing ==
- "Can't Get Over" (Released in Sweden, United States, Holland)
1. "Can't Get Over" (Radio) (3:02)
2. "Can't Get Over" (Extended) (4:35)
3. "Can't Get Over" (Short Disco 2007) (3:54)
4. "Can't Get Over" (Long Disco 2007) (6:54)
- "Can't Get Over" (United States Re-release [UK Edit Remixes])
1. "Can't Get Over" (UK Radio Edit) (3:12)
2. "Can't Get Over" (Dave Ramone Edit) (3:00)
3. "Can't Get Over" (Wideboys Edit) (3:12)
4. "Can't Get Over" (Jens Kindervater Edit) (3:26)
5. "Can't Get Over" (Figoboy Remix) (5:34)
6. "Can't Get Over" (Dave Ramone Remix) (6:16)
7. "Can't Get Over" (Wideboys Remix) (6:30)
8. "Can't Get Over" (Jens Kindervater Remix) (4:48)
9. "Can't Get Over" (Buzz Junkies Remix) (5:58)
10. "Can't Get Over" (Wideboys Dub) (6:30)
11. "Can't Get Over" (Buzz Junkies Dub) (5:58)
12. "Can't Get Over" (Instrumental Edit) (3:17)
- "Can't Get Over" (UK CD single)

Pink version:

1. "Can’t Get Over" (UK Radio Edit)
2. "Can’t Get Over" (Wideboys Edit)

Blue version:

1. "Can’t Get Over" (UK Radio Edit)
2. "Can’t Get Over" (Figoboy Remix)
3. "Can’t Get Over" (Dave Ramone Edit)
4. "Can’t Get Over" (Original Edit)
5. "Cry For You" (Warren Clarke Mix)
6. Bonus material (music video, photos, etc.)
- "Can't Get Over" (Australian CD single)
1. "Can't Get Over" (UK Radio Edit)
2. "Can't Get Over" (Wideboys Edit)
3. "Can't Get Over" (Dave Ramone Edit)
4. "Can't Get Over" (Original Edit)
5. "Can't Get Over" (Buzz Junkies Club Mix)
6. "Can't Get Over" (Jens Kindervater Mix)
7. "Can't Get Over" (Figoboy Mix)
- "Can't Get Over" (Australian digital download)
1. "Can't Get Over" (Original) (3:00)
2. "Can't Get Over" (Wideboys Edit) (3:08)
3. "Can't Get Over" (Dave Ramone Edit) (2:58)
4. "Can't Get Over" (Original Mix) (4:33)
5. "Can't Get Over" (Buzz Junkies Club Mix) (5:54)
6. "Can't Get Over" (Jens Kindervater Remix) (4:46)
7. "Can't Get Over" (Figoboy Remix) (5:34)
8. "Can't Get Over" (Dave Ramone Remix) (6:14)
9. "Can't Get Over" (Buzz Junkies Dub Mix) (5:52)
10. "Can't Get Over" (Wideboys Dub) (6:28)
11. "Can't Get Over" (Wideboys Remix) (6:28)
12. "Can't Get Over" (UK Radio Edit) (3:10)
13. "Can't Get Over" (Instrumental) (3:17)
- "Can't Get Over" (Holland Re-release)
1. "Can't Get Over" (UK Radio Edit)
2. "Can’t Get Over" (Original Edit)
- "Can't Get Over" (French digital download)
1. "Can't Get Over" (UK Radio Edit)
2. "Can't Get Over" (Original Edit)
3. "Can't Get Over" (Dave Ramone Edit)
4. "Can't Get Over" (Wideboys Edit)
5. "Can't Get Over" (Dave Ramone Remix)
6. "Can't Get Over" (Figoboy Remix)
7. "Can't Get Over" (Kindervater Remix)
8. "Can't Get Over" (Wideboys Dub)
9. "Can't Get Over" (Wideboys Remix)

== Release history ==
Country	Date	Format	Label
Sweden	20 June 2007	CD single, digital download	Catchy Tunes
United States	27 November 2007	CD single, digital download	Robbins
United States	3 March 2009	CD single, digital download (U.K. Edit Remixes)	Robbins
Netherlands	7 March 2008	CD single, digital download	Silver Angel Records
Netherlands	4 April 2009	CD single, digital download (Re-release)	Spinnin' Records
United Kingdom	9 March 2009	CD single, digital download	Hard2Beat
Australia	24 April 2009	CD single, digital download	Central Station
France	23 February 2009	Digital download	Happy Music

== Charts ==
Chart (2007–2009)	Peak position
Australia (ARIA)	41
Belgium (Ultratop 50 Flanders)	5
CIS Airplay (TopHit)	60
Czech Republic Airplay (ČNS IFPI)	2
Finland (Suomen virallinen lista)	10
Ireland (IRMA)	38
Netherlands (Dutch Top 40)	28
Netherlands (Single Top 100)	35
New Zealand (Recorded Music NZ)	33
Romania (Romanian Top 100)	28
Sweden (Sverigetopplistan)	5
Slovakia Airplay (ČNS IFPI)	6
UK Singles Chart (The Official Charts Company)	14
US Billboard Hot Dance Airplay	12

== Personnel ==
The following people contributed to "Can't Get Over":

- September – lead vocals, backing vocals
- Anoo Bhagavan – backing vocals
- Jonas von der Burg – production, mixing, keyboards, programming
- Joe Yannece – engineering
- Björn Axelsson, Niklas von der Burg – keyboards
- Björn Engelmann Cutting Room Studios – mastering
