= Dancing Shoes (album) =

Studio album by September
- Released: 26 September 2007
- Genre: Dance-pop; house; Europop
- Length: 43:30
- Label: Catchy Tunes
- Producer: Jonas von der Burg

September chronology
In Orbit (2005)	Dancing Shoes (2007)	September (2008)

Singles from Dancing Shoes
- 1. "Can't Get Over" Released: 20 June 2007; 2. "Until I Die" Released: 7 November 2007

Dancing Shoes is the third studio album by Swedish singer September. It was released on 26 September 2007 on Catchy Tunes. The album was September's highest-peaking album in Sweden at the time, peaking at #12 on the Swedish Album Chart. In Poland, the album peaked at #19. Dancing Shoes spawned two singles; "Can't Get Over" and "Until I Die", which both reached the top ten in Sweden. The album track "Because I Love You" was released as a promotional single for her compilation album Gold, and the single edit of "Cry for You was included as a bonus track on this album; it was previously released as single from her previous album In Orbit. Dancing Shoes was nominated for a Swedish Grammis Award in the category Dance/Hip Hop/Soul of the Year.

== Track listing ==
All tracks are written by Jonas von der Burg, Anoo Bhagavan and Niclas von der Burg.

No.	Title	Length
1.	"Candy Love"	2:47
2.	"Until I Die"	3:44
3.	"My Neighbourhood"	3:04
4.	"Can't Get Over"	3:02
5.	"Because I Love You"	3:14
6.	"Taboo"	3:44
7.	"Follow Me"	3:32
8.	"R.I.P."	3:49
9.	"Start It Up"	3:05
10.	"Just an Illusion"	3:42
11.	"Sad Song"	2:57
12.	"Freaking Out"	3:26
13.	"Cry for You" (Single Edit)	3:30
14.	"Can't Get Over" (video)
15.	"Cry for You" (video)
Total length:		43:40

== Charts ==
Chart	Year	Peak position
Swedish Album Chart	2007	12
Polish Album Chart	2007	19
Czech Album Chart	2009	33

== Awards ==
Year	Ceremony	Category	Result
2007	MTV Europe Music Awards	Best Swedish Act	Nominated
2008	P3 Guld	Best Female Artist	Nominated
2008	Grammis	Dance/Hip Hop/Soul of the Year for Dancing Shoes	Nominated
