= Looking for Love (September song) =

Single by September

from the album In Orbit
- Released: 2005 (standard); 11 May 2007 (Germany)
- Recorded: 2005
- Genre: Disco, dance
- Length: 3:24
- Songwriters: Jonas von der Burg, Anoo Bhagavan, Niclas von der Burg, Steve Elson and Dave Stephenson
- Producer: Jonas von der Burg (executive)

September singles chronology
"Satellites" (2005)	"Looking for Love" (2005)	"Cry for You" (2006)

"Looking for Love" is the second single from Swedish singer September's album In Orbit. Released in 2005, it charted in Sweden and Poland, reaching number 17 and number 4, respectively.

The song was included on September's debut UK album, Cry for You, released in August 2009. It samples the track "Run Back" performed by Carl Douglas and written by Dave Stephenson and Steve Elson.

== Formats and track listings ==
"Looking for Love" EP – released: 5 October 2005 (Sweden, Finland, Norway and Denmark)

- "Looking for Love" (Radio Version) (3:23)
- "Looking for Love" (Extended) (5:09)
- "Looking for Love" (Funky Bomb Remix) (3:46)
- "Looking for Love" (Funky Bomb Remix Extended) (5:05)

"Looking for Love" EP – released: 11 May 2007 (Australia, Germany and Switzerland)

- "Looking for Love" (Radio Version) (3:25)
- "Looking for Love" (Extended Version) (5:11)
- "Looking for Love" (Michi Lange Remix) (7:37)
- "Looking for Love" (Punkstar Remix) (5:55)
- "Looking for Love" (Funky Bomb Remix Extended) (5:06)

== Charts ==
Chart (2005–07)	Peak position
CIS Airplay (TopHit)	89
Poland (Polish Airplay Charts)	4
Sweden (Sverigetopplistan)	17
