= September (2004 album) =

Studio album by September
- Released: 11 February 2004
- Genre: Dance-pop; house; Europop
- Length: 38:02
- Label: Stockholm
- Producer: Jonas von der Burg

September chronology
Teen Queen (1999)	September (2004)	In Orbit (2005)

Singles from September
- 1. "La La La (Never Give It Up)" Released: 2 June 2003; 2. "We Can Do It" Released: 3 November 2003; 3. "September All Over" Released: 18 February 2004

September is the debut studio album by Swedish singer and songwriter Petra Marklund, then performing as September. It was released on 11 February 2004 as the first and only album released by September on Stockholm Records. The album entered the Swedish Albums Chart at its peak position of number 36 and remained on the chart for a total of six consecutive weeks.

== Track listing ==
All tracks written by Jonas von der Burg, Anoo Bhagavan and Niclas von der Burg, except "We Can Do It" written by Sigidi, Harold Clayton, J. von der Burg, Bhagavan and N. von der Burg.

No.	Title	Length
1.	"Same Old Song"	3:27
2.	"September All Over"	3:47
3.	"Get What You Paid For"	3:23
4.	"La La La (Never Give It Up)"	3:19
5.	"Mary Ann"	3:08
6.	"We Can Do It"	3:37
7.	"Can't Love Myself"	3:29
8.	"Star Generation"	3:17
9.	"Pretty World"	3:41
10.	"Love Thing"	3:24
11.	"Love for Free" (guest vocal by Anoo Bhagavan)	3:27
Total length:		38:02

== Commercial performance ==
The album debuted and peaked at number 36 on the Swedish Albums Chart and it spent a total of six weeks on the chart.

== Charts ==
Chart performance for September
Chart (2004)	Peak position
Swedish Albums (Sverigetopplistan)	36
