= Petra Marklund =

Swedish singer, songwriter and television presenter (born 1984)

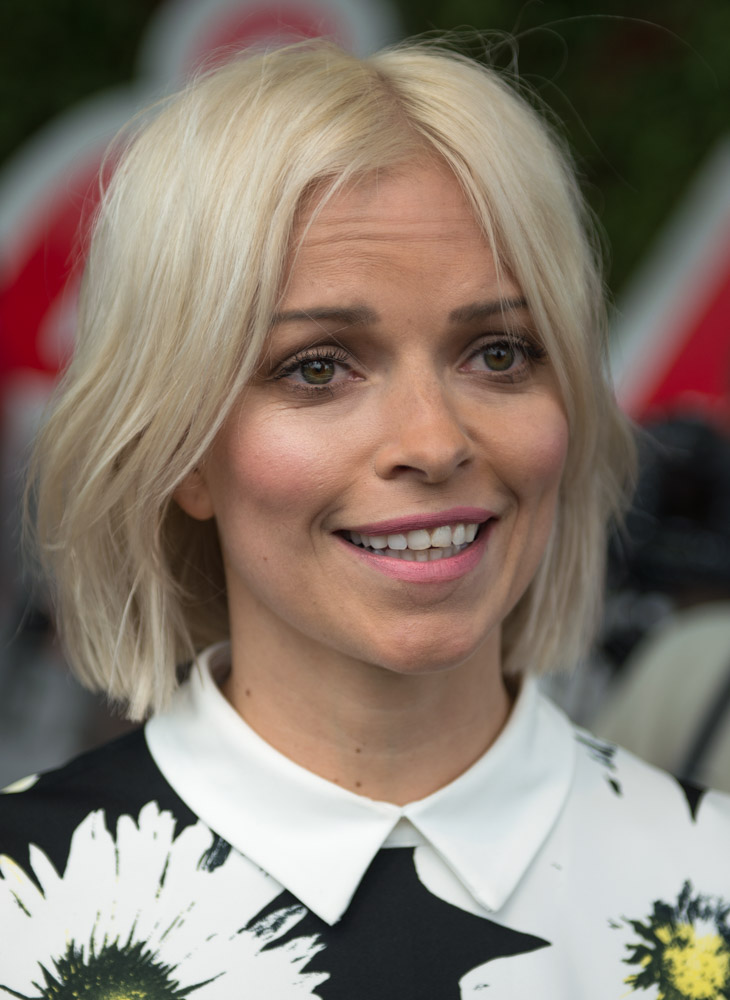
- Marklund in June 2015

Background information
- Also known as: September
- Born: Petra Linnea Paula Marklund; 12 September 1984 (age 42); Älta, Nacka, Stockholm, Sweden
- Genres: Pop; dance-pop; house; electronica; Eurodance
- Occupations: Singer; songwriter; television presenter
- Instruments: Vocals; guitar
- Years active: 2003–present
- Labels: UFO; Stockholm; Catchy Tunes; Razzia; Universal
- Website: www.petramarklund.se

Petra Linnea Paula Marklund (Swedish pronunciation: [ˈpêːtra lɪˈnêːa ˈmârklɵnd]; born 12 September 1984), known also by her previous stage name September, is a Swedish singer, songwriter, and television presenter. Marklund started recording in professional studios around the age of twelve, and first came to the attention of the music scene with September's debut single "La La La (Never Give It Up)" in 2003, released from her studio album September (2004).

Marklund's Grammis Award-winning third studio album In Orbit was released in 2005 and spawned two hit singles; "Satellites" and "Cry for You," which made it to No. 8 and No. 1, respectively, on the Billboard Hot Dance Airplay chart. "Cry for You" remains the most successful international single of her career and was also nominated for the Government's Music Export Prize 2008 in Sweden for selling more than a million copies worldwide.

In Sweden, Marklund had her biggest success with the Swedish-language single "Mikrofonkåt", originally performed by Swedish rapper Petter. It became her first number-one hit in her native country, held the top position for 11 consecutive weeks, and was certified 8× Platinum. It was included on the fourth September studio album, Love CPR (2011), which also hit number one in Sweden and subsequently became Marklund's best selling album so far.

Marklund released her first Swedish-language studio album, Inferno, in 2012 under her own name, to distinguish from September. Lead single "Händerna mot himlen" was certified 6× Platinum as per 5 May 2015. She was the host of Swedish sing-along show Allsång på Skansen from 2014 to 2015. Her second Swedish-language studio album Ensam inte stark was released in November 2015.

== Early life ==
Marklund was born in Stockholm, Sweden, to a Slovenian mother, who had a musical background and even entered in a Slovenian Music Contest, and a Swedish father, who is a professor of space physics. Her sister is a fashion designer. When Marklund was a child, her family used to call her the "September child", hence her stage name. Marklund began recording music in studios at age 12, but did not commercially release material until later.

== Career ==
=== Early work ===
In 1998, Petra Marklund was discovered by Swedish producer and songwriter Hans Edler. She recorded her first album Teen Queen, produced and written by Edler and released in 1999. However, the album was unsuccessful and received negative reviews. When she was 17, she sang in a rock band and gained a record deal. Before releasing her first single "La La La (Never Give It Up)", she was working in a nightclub in Stockholm, and she said she recalled her song being played on the dancefloor for the very first time after being released. She had stated that she used to play guitar outside shops so she could get money to "buy lollies".

=== 2003–2006: September and In Orbit ===
On 2 June 2003, at the age of 18, she had released her debut single "La La La (Never Give It Up)". The single was a success in her homeland in Sweden, where it peaked at number 8 for twenty two weeks. The second single that was released was "We Can Do It", which was released on 3 November 2003. The song peaked at number 10, staying in the charts for twelve weeks. Due to the success of both the singles, the self-titled album September was released on 11 February 2004 in Sweden, then released worldwide later in 2004. The song peaked at number 36 on the charts, becoming a least success, but stayed on the charts for six weeks. As a result, September released her last single "September All Over". The song peaked at number 8, and stayed in the charts for ten weeks.

After a silence for a while, September later signed to her current label CatchyTunes, and later released the single "Satellites" on 6 July 2005. "Satellites" was Septembers first single from her second studio album In Orbit and peaked at number 4 on the Swedish Single Charts, staying in for twenty nine weeks. It also manage to chart in Finland, peaking at number 18, for one week. The song currently stands at number 139 in the Swedish All-time best performing in the Singles Chart being certified as Platinum.

Her second single was "Looking For Love", which had peaked at number 17 on the Swedish Charts, breaking Septembers top ten singles, staying in the charts for thirteen weeks. September later released her third single "Flowers on the Grave", which was released on 1 March 2006. The song was unsuccessful in Sweden, as it did not manage to chart on any important charts. After it did not manage to chart, it was released additionally as a promotional single outside Scandinavia and Europe. After releasing the single, she later released her fourth single "It Doesn't Matter". The song was not meant to release in Sweden, instead in other parts of Europe. It had minor success in Russia and Romania, where it peaked at 121 and 66 respectively. It had success through Poland, where it peaked at number 20. September released her fifth single from In Orbit entitled "Cry for You" on 29 November 2006. The song entered at number thirty-eight in Sweden, and peaked at number six, staying in the charts for seventeen weeks. The song was later released worldwide, receiving much attention. The song was certified Gold by International Federation of the Phonographic Industry (IFPI) in Sweden.

Worldwide, the song proved to be a success. The song was released in the United States, where her compilation September also got an official release. The song peaked at number seventy-four on the Official Billboard charts, number twenty-nine on the Billboard Pop songs, and number 1 on Billboard Hot Dance Airplay. It peaked at number thirty-three in Canada. She became the first Swedish singer to receive a certification in the United States since Ace of Base's 1998 hit, Cruel Summer. In total, the song sold over 1.5 million copies worldwide. The song was listed at number five on the Top 100 Club Chart Year-End result, and was the biggest selling-dance song of the year. The song was also successful in the Oceanic regions, as it peaked at fourteen in Australia and thirty-nine in New Zealand.

=== 2007–2011: Dancing Shoes and Love CPR ===
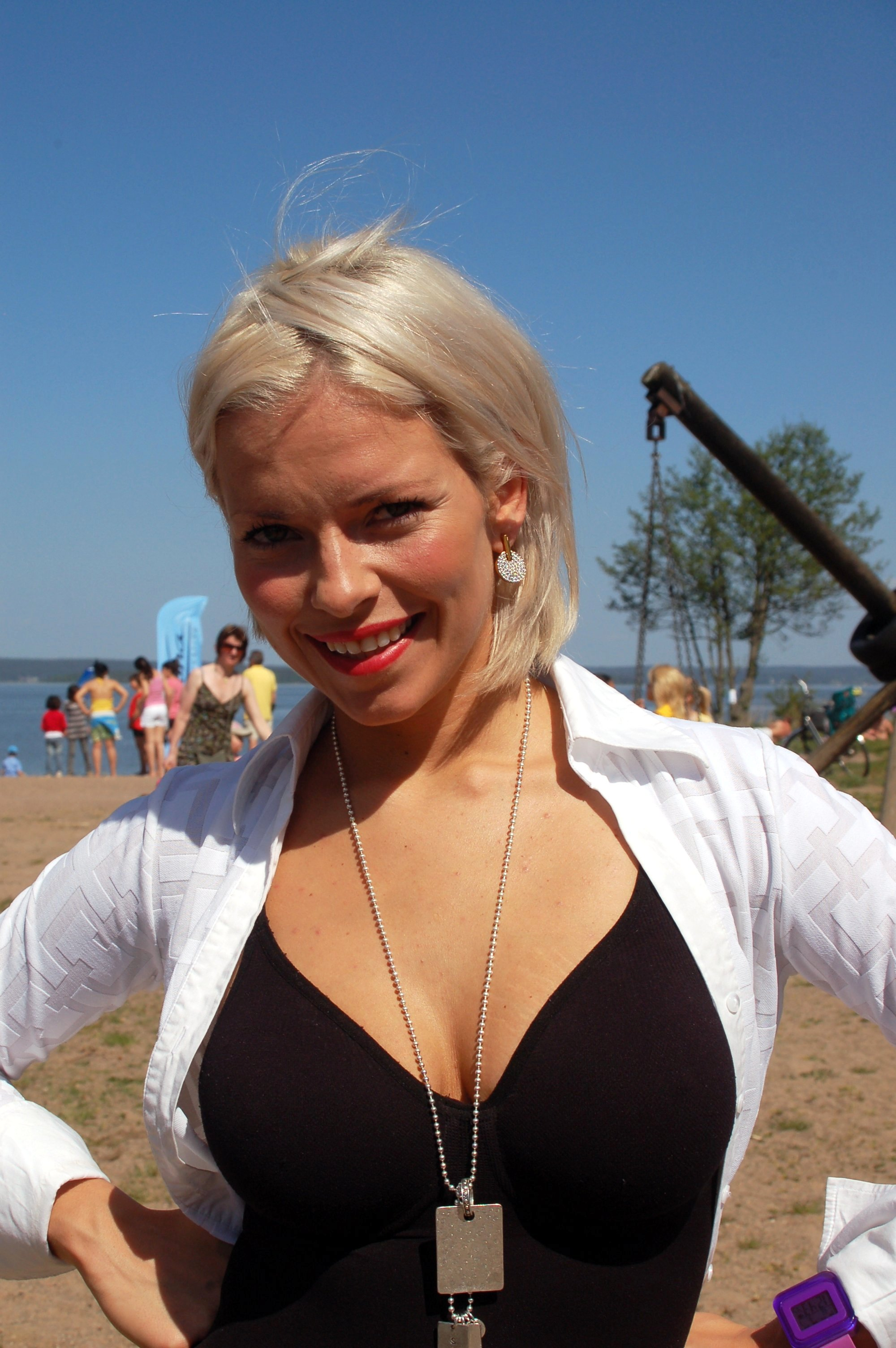
Petra Marklund in 2008

On 1 September 2007, September competed in the Sopot International Song Festival in Poland, representing Sweden, her rivals were music stars: Sophie Ellis-Bextor, Thierry Amiel, The Cloud Room and Monrose. She finished 3rd in Viewers Choice (Silver Place) and 2nd in Jury Choice (Amber Place). September released a new single entitled "Can't Get Over" on 20 June 2007 in Sweden and peaked at number five on the charts. The single was followed by the release of Marklund's third album in September called Dancing Shoes. The album reached 12 on the Swedish album chart. It only remained on the charts for 4 weeks while her previous two albums remained on the charts for 6 weeks. The second single released from the album is "Until I Die" it entered at five in Sweden, while it later peaked at six in Finland.

On 26 February 2008, Marklund released her debut album in the US, Canada and Australia called September. On 6 April 2008 she released her second U.K. single "Cry for You", the single has been remixed for the release and a new video filmed. The song peaked at number five on the UK Singles Chart. September released her 11th single "Because I Love You" on 26 November 2008, a week before releasing her third compilation album, "September". "Can't Get Over" was released in the United Kingdom, and peaked at fourteen on the UK Singles Chart. The song resulted as her last charting single in that country. September performed the new song "Leave It All Behind" at Dance Nation Live stating that it would be the next UK single, however her label Hard2Beat has confirmed that the next UK single will be "Until I Die" instead. During Summer 2009, September took residency in the UK to promote her new album. "Until I Die" was expected to be released at the end of July 2009 but due to lack of radio support, the release was canceled. The debut album for September in the UK was given a digital only release on 3 August 2009. The album is entitled Cry For You and features new material, material from previous albums and re-worked material.

On 12 November 2010, September released the single "Mikrofonkåt" as a digital download in Sweden only. The song debuted at number one on Swedish Singles Charts, making it Septembers most successful single in Sweden alone. The song stayed in the charts for over forty weeks and was certified 8× Platinum, resulting it as her longest spanning single and her most certified single to date. Her second single "Resuscitate Me", which was released on 19 November 2010. The song was released in Europe and in Australasian territories, where it charted at number forty-five, staying in the charts for two weeks, becoming Septembers least successful single in Sweden.

September released her fourth studio album Love CPR on 11 February 2011 in Sweden. The album peaked at number 1 on Swedish Album Charts, and received double platinum, becoming Septembers only album to be certificated and her highest effort to date. The album was then released in the Oceanic and European regions, her first studio album to do so. For the third single, September released "Me & My Microphone", the English version of Mikrofonkat. September did mention that the single will be released worldwide. However, the song's commercial success was a failure, only peaking at forty-one on the Belgium Singles Chart. September announced that she will be touring for her album, as she had said on her official website. September announced that the third Swedish single is "Party in My Head". The song was eventually released worldwide on 11 May 2012. The song peaked at thirty-two on the Swedish Singles Chart, and released a music video, along with "Me & My Microphone".

=== 2012–2022: Inferno and Ensam inte stark ===
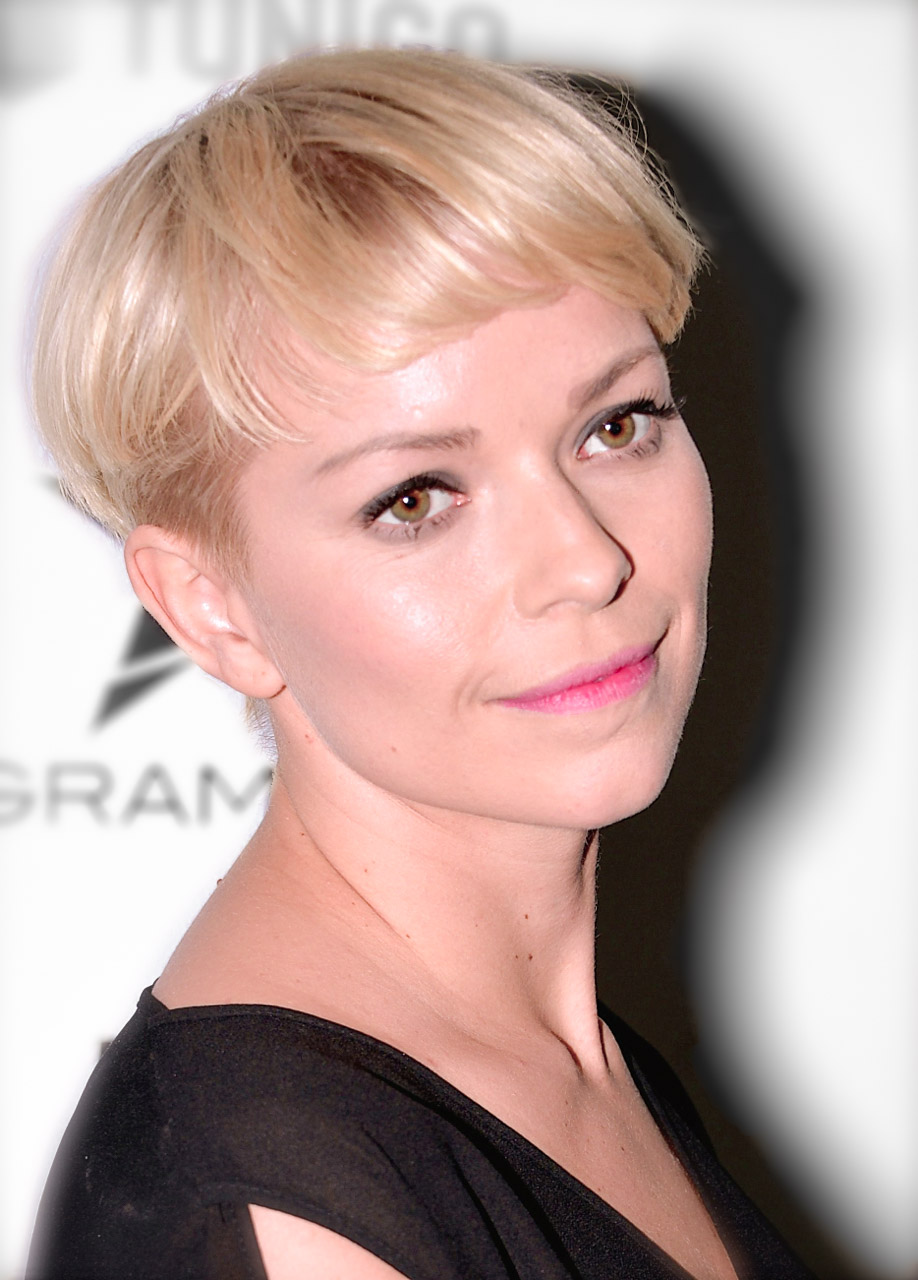
Petra Marklund at the Grammis Awards in 2013

Marklund's first album in Swedish, Inferno, was released in October 2012. She stated "I am both pleased and a little excited to finally release this album. It has been absolutely amazing and inspiring to be working with Daniel, Saska and Jocke during this time. This disc has been in my mind for quite a long time so it feels great that it is ready now." She announced that this studio album will have no trace of her signature eurodance style, and stated the album will be "Dark... and personal" and also stated that there is musical traces of pop and hip hop. Talking about the process of the new album, Marklund said: "This is music with a focus on developing the musical and experimental, we have done a lot of strange variants of each melody, which in turn led on to something new. Playful. Pop music I sing that September is done on a basis that is based on more rules. Things I've learned about how to work out a cruel verse or melody and also is of course the music more beat-driven than this [...] It is a musical with a different dynamic"

The first single, Händerna Mot Himlen," was released on 14 September 2012, two days after her birthday. The artwork of the single was also released. The song will premiere on radio stations in Sweden on 14 September. The music video premiered not long after the release. Along with the release of "Händerna Mot Himlen", her US record label Robbins Entertainment announced to release "Hands Up" as the last single of the Love CPR album, as a completion of the album. She hosted weekly sing-along show Allsång på Skansen on SVT during 2014–15. A media critic commented: "The previous two years with Petra Marklund does not go down in history as a success. Not that she was an exceptionally bad host, but it felt like every Tuesday there were about seventy eleven places she would rather be than on the Solliden stage. That she even lined up a second season was probably mostly a desire not to appear discouraged by the criticism."

Marklund released her second Swedish-language studio album Ensam inte stark on 13 November 2015 under her true name, not her previous stage name, September. The album debuted at number eleven on the Swedish album chart. "Som du bäddar" was released as the album's lead single on 18 September 2015 and its music video was released on 9 October 2015. Ensam inte stark has been described as dark and deep electronica album with themes of sadness, loneliness, disappointment and heartbreak. In early 2016, touring under her own name, ticket sales were poor in Umeå and Luleå, both in the north of Sweden, and she was forced to cancel several concerts.

=== 2023–present: Ocean of Love ===
In July 2023, Marklund returned with her first English release in over a decade, "Ocean of Love". It is the official song of the 2023 Stockholm Pride, and is, according to Marklund, "My disco tribute to Pride, and it's about the sea of love that exists out there, and daring to let oneself fall freely despite all the twisted circumstances. There's so much joy. It's meant for all of us. Let's dive in now!".

In 2006, Marklund achieved widespread international recognition with her chart-topping single "Cry for You". Subsequently, on 27 October 2023, she unveiled an acoustic rendition of the song, distributing it through her independent record label, Petra Marklund Productions AB.

== Artistry ==
I always do my own fashion, myself. I am designing my own clothes. I design the clothes that I wear and my dances too. That is one thing why I have really different clothes, I also work with a really good stylist, a talented one. I want to have thing that are really different. I like unique, cool and catchy fashion. I create it.

-September talking about her fashion style.

Musically, Marklund has evolved from dance-pop and electronic styles (2000s) to Swedish-language music and more introspective themes (2010s). In the earlier period, she stated in an interview that after the release of Teen Queen, "People think I am stupid just because I have blond hair and sing dance music." In "The Story of September", she said that her biggest influence and idols were Kylie Minogue, Sophie Ellis-Bextor, Lily Allen, Kanye West and Madonna. As for her music, she considers herself a "disco and "dance" musician. Ever since she was little, she played the guitar and danced.

Marklund is known for her distinctive vocal range. She is one of the few dance-pop artists whose voice is considered recognizable. Her dance music is typically upbeat with a focus on pop music structures and four-to-the-floor beats. Lyrically, her songs of the early era tended to stay in the vein of love or heartbreak. Most of the songs are original arrangements; however "Midnight Heartache" from the In Orbit album contains a sample of "Bette Davis Eyes" by Kim Carnes. In an interview with Girl.co.au, she commented on her writing process saying "a lot of my songs are often [break-up songs]."

In 2011, her image had changed which includes avant-garde fashion and her platinum-blonde hair, which was styled in a boy cut for her "Resuscitate Me" video. For her style, she said that she "design the clothes that I wear and my dances too."

Petra Marklund provided the vocals for a song by German electronica project Schiller. The track is called "Breathe" and can be found on Schiller's album Sehnsucht. The song charted at number one on the Macedonian Singles Top 20. On 16 November 2010, September released a cover of Petter's Mikrofonkåt after she performed it on Så mycket bättre. "Kärlekens Tunga" appeared and then charted at number six on Swedish Singles Chart, and thus became her ninth top-ten hit in Sweden overall. On 24 December, September released a duet with Petter from Så mycket bättre and it peaked at number 3 on the Swedish chart. It has been certified as Platinum. Marklund appears as background vocal artist on Kent's 2014 album "Tigerdrottningen" She made several public appearances with Kent, including at Kentfest in mid-2014, singing on Svart snö.

== Personal life ==
She has lived in London, England, since 2009, where she has gone to a dance school. She gave birth to her first child in 2016. She gave birth to her second child in September 2018.

== Awards and nominations ==
BMI Pop Awards

Year	Nominee / work	Award	Result
2009	"Cry for You"	Dance Award	Won

Billboard Music Awards

Year	Nominee / work	Award	Result	Ref.
2007	"Cry for You"	Top Hot Dance Airplay Track	Nominated	

Grammys

Year	Category	Nominated work	Result
2006	Club/Dance of the Year	In Orbit	Won
2008	Dance/Hip Hop/Soul of the Year	Dancing Shoes	Nominated
2012	Song of the Year	"Baksmälla"	Nominated
2012	Song of the Year	"Mikrofonkåt"	Nominated
2013	Pop of the Year	Inferno	Nominated

International Dance Music Awards

Year	Nominee / work	Award	Result
2008	"Cry for You"	Best HiNRJ/Euro Track	Nominated

After September's huge international success with "Cry for You", September has been nominated with Biggest Music Export from Sweden 2008. Her song "Satellites" was nominated for International Song of the Year at the NRJ Music Awards in 2006 and in 2007 September was nominated for Best Swedish Act at the MTV Europe Music Awards.

== Discography ==
Studio albums
September

- September (2004)
- In Orbit (2005)
- Dancing Shoes (2007)
- Love CPR (2011)

Petra Marklund

- Teen Queen (1999)
- Inferno (2012)
- Ensam inte stark (2015)
- Frimärken (2021)

== Television appearances ==
- Så mycket bättre (8 episodes, 23 October 2010 – 11 December 2010)
- Allsång på Skansen (16 episodes, 24 June 2014 – 11 August 2015)
- Så mycket bättre (3 episodes, 19 October 2019 – 2 November 2019)
- Allsång på Skansen (23 June 2026)
