= Until I Die =

Single by September

from the album Dancing Shoes
- Released: 7 November 2007 (Sweden); January 2008 (Poland); 3 September 2008 (Netherlands); 27 July 2009 (U.K.)
- Genre: Electronica: Eurodance; dance-pop
- Length: 3:46
- Label: Catchy Tunes
- Songwriters: Anoo Bhagavan, Jonas von der Burg, Niklas von der Burg
- Producer: Jonas von der Burg

September singles chronology
"Can't Get Over" (2007)	"Until I Die" (2007)	"Mikrofonkåt" (2010)

"Until I Die" is a song by Swedish singer Petra Marklund performing as September, from her third studio album Dancing Shoes (2007). It was released on 7 November 2007 in Sweden as the album's second and final single, while in the UK, a remix produced by Dave Ramone was released as a digital download in the country by Hard2Beat as the third and final single from Cry for You - The Album (2009). The song was written by Anoo Bhagavan, Jonas von der Burg and Niklas von der Burg.

Musically, "Until I Die" is a Eurodance song, which features dance-pop and electronica influences. It received positive reviews from critics, praising her darker tone and felt it was catchy as well. Commercially, it remains September's least successful single in her home country, debuting and peaking five before falling out of the top forty the following week, lasting for five weeks in total. The song achieved more success in Finland, peaking at number six and staying in the charts there for thirteen weeks. A music video for the Dave Ramone remix was released by Hard2Beat on their YouTube channel, which features her dancing, and her walking through clockworks.

== Release controversy ==
Hard2Beat Records announced that Until I Die was due to be released on 27 July 2009, as the third single from her debut UK album, Cry For You - The Album in a new remixed version done by Dave Ramone. However, it has been announced that the song's release has been cancelled due to lack of radio play. Rumours circulating the internet suggest that the song failing to make BBC Radio 1's playlist resulted in Hard2Beat scrapping the release. It was also stated that BBC Radio 1 refused to add it on their playlist, causing it to be cancelled.

However, it was released in the United Kingdom physically and digitally not long after.

== Reception ==
=== Critical reception ===
"Until I Die" received generally favorable reviews from music critics. Ron Slomowicz from About.com selected the song as "Song of the Day". He said "its one of those records that is not instant. It will take a few listens to grasp the power of the lyrics and realize that this is one of the most intelligently written dance songs of the year." He then concluded saying "Though some might object to the Capella-styled production style, I think it just adds to its subtle brilliance."

=== Chart performance ===
"Until I Die" was officially released in Europe on 3 September 2007. The song debuted on the Swedish Singles Chart on 13 November 2007 at number five It remained on the singles chart for five weeks, exiting on 11 December 2007, becoming September's least successful single released in Sweden so far.

In Finland, the track debuted at number sixteen on 8 January 2008. Five weeks after its debut, "Until I Die" reached its peak position at number six. The song remained on the Finnish Singles Chart for thirteen weeks, exiting on 1 April 2008 and becoming the first single of September's to remain on the Finnish Top 20 charts for more than one week.

== Formats and track listings ==
These are the formats and track listings of major single releases of "Until I Die".

- Catchy Tunes (2007)
- Silver Angel Records (2008)
- Hard2Beat Records (2009)

Swedish CD Single

(CATCHY #080; Released 7 November 2007)

1. "Until I Die" (Radio edit) – 3:46
2. "Until I Die" (Extended mix) – 6:09
3. "Until I Die" (Short club mix) – 3:53
4. "Until I Die" (Long club mix) – 6:47

Dutch CD Single

1. "Until I Die" (Radio Edit) 3:42
2. "Until I Die" (Extended) 6:04
3. "Until I Die" (Jakal Short Clubmix) 3:48
4. "Until I Die" (Jakal Long Clubmix) 6:26

UK Promo CD

1. "Until I Die" (UK Radio Edit)
2. "Until I Die" (The Real Booty Babes Edit)
3. "Until I Die" (Jason Nevins Edit)
4. "Until I Die" (Feed Me Remix)
5. "Until I Die" (The Real Booty Babes Trance Remix)
6. "Until I Die" (Jason Nevins Remix)
7. "Until I Die" (Dave Ramone Club Mix)

== Charts ==
Chart (2007)	Peak position
Czech Republic Airplay (ČNS IFPI)	30
Finland (Suomen virallinen lista)	6
Netherlands (Single Top 100)	91
Poland (Polish Airplay Charts)	4
Romania (Romanian Top 100)	29
Slovakia Airplay (ČNS IFPI)	25
Sweden (Sverigetopplistan)	5

== Personnel ==
The following people contributed to "Until I Die":

- September – lead vocals, backing vocals
- Anoo Bhagavan, Jeanette von der Burg – backing vocals
- Jonas von der Burg – production, mixing, keyboards, programming
- Björn Axelsson, Niklas von der Burg – additional keyboards
- Björn Engelmann – Cutting Room Studios mastering
- Michel Petré – photography
- Andrea Kellerman – artwork
