= In Orbit (September album) =

Studio album by September
- Released: 26 October 2005
- Genres: Dance-pop; house; Europop
- Length: 41:07
- Label: Catchy Tunes
- Producer: Jonas von der Burg

September chronology
September (2004)	In Orbit (2005)	Dancing Shoes (2007)

Singles from In Orbit
- 1. "Satellites" Released: 6 July 2005; 2. "Looking for Love" Released: 19 October 2005; 3. "Cry for You" Released: 29 November 2006

In Orbit is the second studio album by Swedish singer-songwriter Petra Marklund, performing as September. It was released on 26 October 2005 by Catchy Tunes, making it September's first album with the label. The album was supported by three singles; "Satellites", "Looking for Love" and "Cry for You", all which reached at top twenty in Sweden, and two promotional singles; "Flowers on the Grave" and "It Doesn't Matter". The album debuted and peaked at 17 on the Swedish Album Chart, and peaked at 36 on the Finnish Album Chart. In Poland, the album was re-released as a limited edition in 2007, including remixes and a DVD with music videos. This edition peaked at No. 10 and was certified Gold for sales of over 10,000 units. September won a Swedish Grammis Award for In Orbit in the category Club/Dance of the Year in February 2006.

== Track listing ==
All songs written by Jonas von der Burg, Anoo Bhagavan and Niclas von der Burg. "Looking for Love" additionally credits Steve Elson and Dave Stephenson because it interpolates "Run Back" (performed by Carl Douglas), while "Midnight Heartache" credits Donna Weiss and Jackie DeShannon as it samples ''Bette Davis Eyes'' (performed by Kim Carnes).

In Orbit – Standard edition
No.	Title	Length
1.	"Prelude"	0:28
2.	"Cry for You"	3:55
3.	"Looking for Love"	3:24
4.	"Satellites"	3:16
5.	"Flowers on the Grave"	4:18
6.	"It Doesn't Matter"	3:45
7.	"Sacrifice"	3:58
8.	"Good Times"	3:41
9.	"Midnight Heartache"	3:47
10.	"Sound Memory"	3:51
11.	"End of the Rainbow"	3:40
12.	"Satellites" (live acoustic version)	3:03
13.	"Satellites" (video)
14.	"Looking for Love" (video)
Total length:		41:07

In Orbit – Polish limited edition
No.	Title	Length
13.	"Cry for You"	3:53
14.	"Looking for Love" (Funky Bomb Remix)	3:46
15.	"Satellites" (Electro Mix)	3:27
Total length:		51:19

In Orbit – Polish limited edition bonus DVD
No.	Title	Length
1.	"Cry for You" (video)
2.	"Flowers on the Grave" (video)
3.	"Looking for Love" (video)
4.	"Satellites" (video)

Notes

- The Polish limited edition replaces the album version of "Cry for You" with its single edit, with the album version being moved down as the thirteen track.
- The Polish limited edition bonus DVD also includes a photo gallery comprising four photos.

== Charts ==
Chart	Year	Peak position	Certification	Sale
Swedish Albums Chart	2005	17	–	–
Finnish Albums Chart	2006	36	–	–
Polish Albums Chart	2007	10	Gold	10,000+

== Awards ==
Year	Ceremony	Category	Result
2006	Grammis	Club/Dance of the Year for In Orbit	Won
2006	NRJ Music Awards	International Song of the Year for "Satellites"	Nominated
2007	ESKA Music Awards	Hit of the Year – World for "Satellites"	Won
2007	Sopot Festival	Bursztynowy Słowik (Amber Nightingale) for "Cry for You"	2nd place
2007	Sopot Festival	Słowik Publiczności (Public's Nightingale) for "Cry for You"	3rd place
