= Satellites (song) =

Single by September

from the album In Orbit
- Released: 6 July 2005
- Recorded: 2003
- Genre: Europop, dance-pop
- Length: 3:16
- Label: Catchy Tunes
- Songwriters: Jonas von der Burg, Anoo Bhagavan, Niclas von der Burg
- Producer: Jonas von der Burg

September singles chronology
"September All Over" (2004)	"Satellites" (2005)	"Looking for Love" (2005)

"Satellites" is the first single by Petra Marklund (performing as September) from her second album In Orbit, and is the first single released under her contract with Catchy Tunes. The single was a success in Sweden and Finland and was later released in variety of countries worldwide, such as Poland, Romania, Spain, Israel, the United Kingdom and the United States, being September's first international release. "Satellites" is considered September's second biggest hit to date (after "Cry for You"), becoming a hit in almost all countries it was released in.

Portuguese television network SIC used the song to promote its now discontinued WAP service, SIC Música. This helped the song gain popularity in Portugal resulting in it becoming a hit, being one of the most played songs on Portuguese radio stations in 2007.

== Usage in media ==
The song was used by Portuguese television network SIC as a promotional song for the now discontinued WAP service SIC Música. It was also used in the Portuguese show Floribella.

== Critical reception ==
"Satellites" was well received by both critics and audience. The Swedish magazine Sonic named Satellites one of the top 15 Euro disco songs of all time. "The team of producers behind this lush dream, painted in equal parts viscos and house, have understood the genius of the eternally simple," writes their reviewer Sara Martinsson.

== Music video ==
The music video for the song was produced by Swedish company Wreck. It was released in 2005 and is featured on the album In Orbit. It premiered on Catchy Tunes' Myspace account on 29 May 2007. The video features September dancing while wearing different colored scarves: red, yellow and orange, all wearing a white dress. The audio tracks used in the US and German versions of the video are different from the audio track found on the album: the US Mix is slightly shorter and features additional bells, the German Radio Edit is a less electronic version of the song.

== Live performances ==
The song was performed live at Portugal's Golden Globes.

== Track listings ==
- Scandinavian CD single (CATCHY003)
1. "Satellites" (Radio Edit) (3:16)
2. "Satellites" (Extended) (4:34)
3. "Satellites" (Electro Mix Short) (3:29)
4. "Satellites" (Electro Mix Long) (4:52)
- French CD single (983 458 4)
1. "Satellites" (Radio Edit) (3:16)
2. "Satellites" (Electro Mix Short) (3:29)
3. "Satellites" (Extended) (4:34)
4. "Satellites" (Electro Mix Long) (4:52)
- French 12" vinyl (983 458 5)
1. "Satellites" (Extended) (4:34)
2. "Satellites" (Electro Mix Long) (4:52)
- Italian 12" vinyl (DO IT 30-05)
1. "Satellites" (Extended) (4:32)
2. "Satellites" (Radio Edit) (3:13)
3. "Satellites" (Electro Mix Long) (4:51)
4. "Satellites" (Electro Mix Short) (3:26)
- Australasian CD single (DELUXECD5003)
1. "Satellites" (Radio Edit) (3:16)
2. "Satellites" (Extended) (4:34)
3. "Satellites" (Electro Mix Short) (3:29)
4. "Satellites" (Electro Mix Long) (4:52)
- US CD single (76869-72148-2)
1. "Satellites" (US Mix) (3:07)
2. "Satellites" (Electro Mix Edit) (3:26)
3. "Satellites" (Extended Mix) (4:34)
4. "Satellites" (Club Junkies Mix) (6:11)
5. "Satellites" (Electro Mix) (5:52)
6. "Satellites" (Clubstar Remix) (5:23)
7. "Satellites" (Flip & Fill Remix) (5:45)
8. "Satellites" (Dancing DJs Remix) (5:47)
- UK CD single (CDGLOBE538)
1. "Satellites" (Radio Edit) (3:17)
2. "Satellites" (Extended Mix) (4:34)
3. "Satellites" (Acoustic Mix) (3:04)
4. "Satellites" (Dancing DJs Remix) (5:48)
5. "Satellites" (Soul Seekerz Remix) (7:24)
6. "Satellites" (Flip & Fill Remix) (5:44)
7. "Satellites" (KB Project Remix) (5:53)
- German CD single (0177965KON, KONTOR 577)
1. "Satellites" (Radio Edit) (3:06)
2. "Satellites" (International Radio Version) (3:16)
3. "Satellites" (Live Acoustic Version) (3:03)
4. "Satellites" (Extended) (4:34)
5. "Satellites" (Electro Mix Short) (3:29)

== Official versions ==
- Album Version/Radio Edit (3:16)
- Club Junkies Mix (6:11)
- Club Junkies Remix Radio (3:41)
- Clubstar Remix (5:23)
- Dancing DJs Remix (5:47)
- Danny D Extended Mix (6:17)
- Danny D Radio Edit Remix (3:49)
- Dave Ramone Extended (5:52) (unreleased)
- Electro Mix Long (4:52)
- Electro Mix Short (3:29)
- Extended (4:34)
- Flip & Fill Remix (5:45)
- Hard2Beat Edit (3:15)
- KB Project Remix (5:53)
- Live Acoustic Version (3:03)
- US Mix/German Radio Edit (3:06)
- Soul Seekerz Dub (7:08)
- Soul Seekerz Remix (7:24)
- The Disco Boys Remix (7:12)
- The Disco Boys Remix Radio Edit (4:19)

== Release history ==
Region	Date	Label	Format
Scandinavia	6 July 2005	Catchy Tunes	CD single, digital download
France	2005	Airplay Records	CD single, 12" vinyl, digital download
Italy	2005	Do It Yourself Entertainment	12" vinyl
Australasia	18 April 2006	Deluxe	CD single, digital download
United States	11 July 2006	Robbins Entertainment	CD single, digital download
United Kingdom	25 September 2006	All Around the World	CD single, digital download
Germany	1 December 2006	Kontor Records	CD single, digital download

== Charts ==
=== Weekly charts ===
Chart (2005–2008)	Peak position
CIS Airplay (TopHit)	13
Finland (Suomen virallinen lista)	18
Poland (Polish Airplay Charts)	1
Romania (Romanian Top 100)	5
Russia Airplay (TopHit)	10
Spain (Los 40 Principales)	1
Sweden (Sverigetopplistan)	4
UK Singles (OCC)	96

=== Year-end charts ===
Chart (2005)	Position
CIS (TopHit)	33
Russia Airplay (TopHit)	46
Sweden (Sverigetopplistan)	27

Chart (2006)	Position
CIS (TopHit)	77
Romania (Romanian Top 100)	28
Russia Airplay (TopHit)	97

=== Decade-end charts ===
Decade-end chart performance for "Satellites"
Chart (2000–2009)	Position
Russia Airplay (TopHit)	151

== Certifications ==
Region	Certification	Certified units/sales
Sweden (GLF)	Platinum	20,000^{^}
United Kingdom (BPI)	Silver	200,000^{‡}
^{^} Shipments figures based on certification alone.^{‡} Sales+streaming figures based on certification alone.
