= 3 Doors Down discography =

Rock band discography

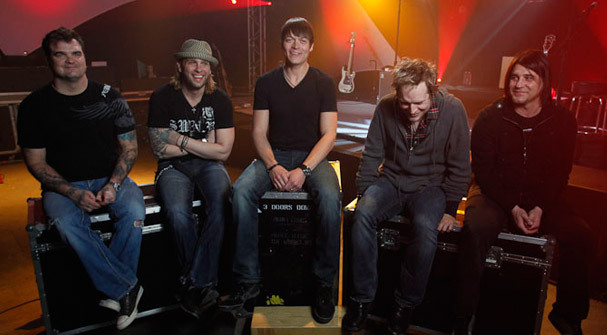
- 3 Doors Down in 2011
- Studio albums: 6
- Extended plays: 5
- Compilation albums: 1
- Singles: 29
- Video albums: 1
- Music videos: 22
- Demo albums: 1

The American rock band 3 Doors Down has released six studio albums, four extended plays, 29 singles, one video album and one compilation album.

The band's first studio album, The Better Life, was released in 2000. Helped by the singles "Kryptonite", "Loser", "Duck and Run", and "Be Like That", the album peaked at number seven on the Billboard 200 and was certified seven times platinum by the RIAA. "Kryptonite", "Loser", and "Duck and Run" all reached number one on the Mainstream Rock chart, and "Kryptonite" was certified octuple platinum by the RIAA.

Away from the Sun, their next studio album, was released in 2002. It peaked at number eight on the Billboard 200 and was certified four times platinum by the RIAA. The single "When I'm Gone" reached number one on the Mainstream Rock chart. Another single from the album, "Here Without You", reached number one on the Adult Pop Songs chart and was certified six times platinum by the RIAA.

The band then released Seventeen Days in 2005. It reached number one on the Billboard 200 and was certified platinum by the RIAA. Their next studio album, 2008's 3 Doors Down, also reached number one on the Billboard 200. It was certified Platinum by the RIAA. "It's Not My Time" became the band's fifth single to top the Mainstream Rock chart and the band's second single to top the Adult Pop Songs chart.

Time of My Life, 3 Doors Down's fifth studio album, was released in 2011. It peaked at number three on the Billboard 200.

The band had sold a total of 13,337,000 albums in the United States as of July 2014.

== Albums ==
=== Studio albums ===
List of studio albums, with selected chart positions and certifications
Title	Details	Peak chart positions										Sales	Certifications
Title	Details	US	AUS	AUT	CAN	DEN	FIN	GER	NLD	NZ	SWI	Sales	Certifications
The Better Life	Released: February 8, 2000; Label: Universal; Format: CD, CS, digital download	7	16	56	6	—	23	45	26	19	—	US: 5,653,000	RIAA: 7× Platinum; ARIA: Gold; BPI: Silver; BVMI: Gold; MC: 2× Platinum; RMNZ: Gold
Away from the Sun	Released: November 12, 2002; Label: Universal Republic; Format: CD, CS, digital download, DualDisc	8	8	27	—	2	—	28	25	11	49	US: 3,863,000	RIAA: 4× Platinum; ARIA: Platinum; BPI: Silver; BVMI: Gold; MC: Platinum; RMNZ: Gold
Seventeen Days	Released: February 8, 2005; Label: Universal Republic; Format: CD, digital download, DualDisc	1	54	12	6	14	17	6	26	—	15	US: 1,434,000	RIAA: Platinum; BVMI: Gold; MC: Gold
3 Doors Down	Released: May 20, 2008; Label: Universal Republic; Format: CD, digital download	1	55	14	3	28	28	6	59	22	6	US: 820,000	RIAA: Platinum; BVMI: Gold; MC: Gold
Time of My Life	Released: July 19, 2011; Label: Universal Republic; Formats: CD, digital download	3	58	7	8	26	34	2	37	—	2		
Us and the Night	Released: March 11, 2016; Label: Republic; Formats: CD, digital download	14	34	14	15	—	—	5	45	—	4		
"—" denotes a recording that did not chart or was not released in that territory.

=== Compilation albums ===
List of compilation albums, with selected chart positions
Title	Details	Peak chart positions				
Title	Details	US	US Rock	US Alt.	CAN	SWI
The Greatest Hits	Released: November 19, 2012; Label: Republic; Formats: CD, digital download	23	4	13	25	87

=== Video albums ===
List of video albums
Title	Details
Away from the Sun: Live from Houston, Texas	Released: November 8, 2005; Label: Monster; Formats: DVD

== Demo albums ==
List of demo albums
Title	Details
3 Doors Down	Released: 1997; Label: none (self-released); Format: CD

== Extended plays ==
List of extended plays, with selected chart positions and certifications
Title	Details	Peak chart positions	Certifications
Title	Details	US	Certifications
Another 700 Miles	Released: November 11, 2003; Label: Universal Republic; Formats: CD	21	RIAA: Gold
Acoustic EP	Released: June 5, 2005; Label: Universal Republic; Formats: CD, digital download	—	
A Six Pack of Hits	Released: November 27, 2008; Label: Universal Republic; Formats: CD	—	
Where My Christmas Lives	Released: December 8, 2009; Label: Universal Republic; Formats: Digital download	—	
Acoustic Back Porch Jam	Released: February 6, 2019; Label: Unknown; Formats: Digital download		
"—" denotes a recording that did not chart or was not released in that territory.

== Singles ==
List of singles, with selected chart positions and certifications, showing year released and album name
Title	Year	Peak chart positions										Certifications	Album
Title	Year	US	US Adult	US Alt.	US Main. Rock	AUS	FIN	GER	NLD	NZ	UK	Certifications	Album
"Kryptonite"	2000	3	4	1	1	8	33	85	21	13	—	RIAA: 8× Platinum; ARIA: Platinum; BPI: Platinum; BVMI: Platinum; RMNZ: 6× Platinum	The Better Life
"Loser"	2000	55	36	2	1	68	—	78	67	37	—	RIAA: Platinum; RMNZ: Gold	The Better Life
"Duck and Run"	2001	— (Note: "Duck and Run" did not enter the Billboard Hot 100, but peaked at number 10 on the Bubbling Under Hot 100 Singles chart, which ranks the top 25 songs that have not entered the Hot 100.)	—	11	1	—	—	—	—	—	—		The Better Life
"Be Like That"	2001	24	5	22	10	—	—	—	—	—	144	RIAA: Platinum	The Better Life
"When I'm Gone"	2002	4	3	2	1	64	—	—	95	—	—	RIAA: 3× Platinum; RMNZ: Platinum	Away from the Sun
"The Road I'm On"	2003	—	—	24	8	—	—	—	—	—	—		Away from the Sun
"Here Without You"	2003	5	1	22	14	2	38	23	12	10	77	RIAA: 6× Platinum; ARIA: Platinum; BPI: Gold; BVMI: Gold; RMNZ: 4× Platinum	Away from the Sun
"Away from the Sun"	2004	62	5	33	20	51	—	—	41	44	—	RIAA: Gold	Away from the Sun
"Let Me Go"	2004	14	3	14	6	55	23	55	50	—	133	RIAA: Platinum	Seventeen Days
"Behind Those Eyes"	2005	—	—	25	12	—	—	—	—	—	—		Seventeen Days
"Landing in London" (featuring Bob Seger)	2005	—	31	—	32	—	—	79	56	—	—		Seventeen Days
"Here by Me"	2005	—	34	—	—	—	—	—	—	—	—		Seventeen Days
"Live for Today"	2005	—	—	31	18	—	—	—	—	—	—		Seventeen Days
"Citizen/Soldier"	2007	96	—	—	19	—	—	—	—	—	—	RIAA: Gold	3 Doors Down
"It's Not My Time"	2008	17	1	5	1	26	12	37	—	18	—	RIAA: 3× Platinum; RMNZ: Platinum	3 Doors Down
"Train"	2008	—	—	29	10	—	—	—	—	—	—		3 Doors Down
"Let Me Be Myself"	2008	— (Note: "Let Me Be Myself" did not enter the Billboard Hot 100, but peaked at number 21 on the Bubbling Under Hot 100 Singles chart, which ranks the top 25 songs that have not entered the Hot 100.)	12	—	—	29	— (Note: "Let Me Be Myself" failed to enter the official singelista chart, but reached number four on the airplay-based radiolistasijoitus chart.)	95	—	—	—	RIAA: Gold	3 Doors Down
"When You're Young"	2011	81	28	31	9	—	— (Note: "When You're Young" failed to enter the official singelista chart, but reached number five on the airplay-based radiolistasijoitus chart.)	—	—	—	171		Time of My Life
"Every Time You Go"	2011	— (Note: "Every Time You Go" did not enter the Billboard Hot 100, but peaked at number four on the Bubbling Under Hot 100 Singles chart, which ranks the top 25 songs that have not entered the Hot 100.)	—	—	16	—	—	—	—	—	—		Time of My Life
"What's Left"	2011	— (Note: "What's Left" did not enter the Billboard Hot 100, but peaked at number 23 on the Bubbling Under Hot 100 Singles chart, which ranks the top 25 songs that have not entered the Hot 100.)	—	— (Note: "What's Left" did not enter the Alternative Airplay, but peaked at number 9 on the Alternative Digital Song Sales.)	— (Note: "What's Left" did not enter the Mainstream Rock Chart, but peaked at number 1 on the Hard Rock Digital Song Sales.)	—	—	—	—	—	—		Time of My Life
"Time of My Life"	2011	—	—	— (Note: "Time of My Life" did not enter the Alternative Airplay, but peaked at number 19 on the Alternative Digital Song Sales.)	— (Note: "Time of My Life" did not enter the Mainstream Rock Chart, but peaked at number 5 on the Hard Rock Digital Song Sales.)	—	—	—	—	—	—		Time of My Life
"Back to Me"	2012	—	—	—	—	—	—	—	—	—	—		Time of My Life
"One Light"	2012	—	—	—	8	—	—	—	—	—	—		The Greatest Hits
"There's a Life"	2013	—	—	—	—	—	—	—	—	—	—		The Greatest Hits
"Goodbyes"	2013	—	—	—	—	—	—	—	—	—	—		The Greatest Hits
"In the Dark"	2016	—	—	—	2	—	—	—	—	—	—		Us and the Night
"Still Alive"	2016	—	—	—	6	—	—	—	—	—	—		Us and the Night
"The Broken"	2016	—	—	—	36	—	—	—	—	—	—		Us and the Night
"Better Life" / "Dead Love"	2021	—	—	—	37	—	—	—	—	—	—		The Better Life (20th Anniversary)
"Wasted Me" / "Man in My Mind"	2021	—	—	—	—	—	—	—	—	—	—		The Better Life (20th Anniversary)
"—" denotes a recording that did not chart or was not released in that territory.

=== Promotional singles ===
List of promotional singles, showing year released and album name
Title	Year	Peak chart positions	Album
Title	Year	US Bub.	Album
"Give It to Me"	2008	—	3 Doors Down
"She Don't Want the World"	2008	—	3 Doors Down
"The Champion in Me"	2008	19	AT&T Team USA Soundtrack
"Shine"	2010	—	AT&T Team USA Soundtrack 2010
"Heaven"	2011	—	Time of My Life
"Believer"	2011	—	Time of My Life
"Inside of Me"	2016	— (Note: "Inside of Me" did not enter the Bubbling Under Hot 100 Singles chart, but peaked at number 20 on the Hard Rock Digital Song Sales.)	Us and the Night
"Us and the Night"	2016	—	Us and the Night
"—" denotes a recording that did not chart or was not released in that territory.

== Music videos ==
List of music videos, showing year released and director
Title	Year	Director(s)
"Kryptonite"	2000	Dean Karr
"Loser"	2001	Liz Friedlander
"Duck and Run"	2001	Marc Webb
"Be Like That"	2001	Liz Friedlander
"When I'm Gone"	2002	The Emperor
"The Road I'm On"	2002	The Malloys
"Here Without You"	2002	Marc Webb
"Away from the Sun"	2002	Noble Jones
"Let Me Go"	2005	Wayne Isham
"Here by Me"	2005	
"Landing in London"	2005	Wayne Isham
"It's Not My Time"	2008	Shaun Silva
"The Champion in Me"	2008	
"Let Me Be Myself"	2008	Wayne Isham
"Citizen/Soldier"	2008	Antoine Fuqua
"When You're Young"	2011	Ryan Smith
"Every Time You Go"	2011	Wayne Isham
"One Light"	2013	Roger Pistole
"In the Dark"	2016	Magnus Jonsson and Martin Landgreve
"Kryptonite (Escatawpa Sessions)"	2021	
"Pop Song"	2023	
