= The Greatest Hits (3 Doors Down album) =

Greatest hits album by 3 Doors Down
- Released: November 19, 2012
- Genres: Post-grunge; alternative rock
- Length: 46:58
- Label: Republic
- Producers: Howard Benson; Paul Ebersold; Johnny K; Rick Parashar

3 Doors Down chronology
| Time of My Life (2011) | The Greatest Hits (2012) | Us and the Night (2016) |

Singles from The Greatest Hits
- 1. "One Light" Released: January 2, 2013; 2. "There's a Life" Released: March 7, 2013; 3. "Goodbyes" Released: May 27, 2013

Professional ratings
Review scores
| Source | Rating |
|---|---|
| AllMusic | 3/5 stars |
| Soundsphere | 4/5 stars |

The Greatest Hits is a greatest hits album by the American rock band 3 Doors Down. It was released by Republic Records on November 19, 2012. The Greatest Hits includes remixed and remastered recordings of the band's nine number-one singles from their first four studio albums: The Better Life (2000), Away from the Sun (2002), Seventeen Days (2005), and 3 Doors Down (2008). Three new songs, "One Light", "There's a Life", and "Goodbyes", are also included and are the first recordings with current guitarist Chet Roberts; former guitarist Matt Roberts left the band in 2012 prior to the release of the compilation.

The album peaked at number 94 on the US Billboard 200, number 7 on the Hard Rock Albums chart, and number 13 on the Alternative Albums chart.

== Track listing ==
All lyrics are written by Brad Arnold.

| No. | Title | Music | Original release (year) | Length |
|---|---|---|---|---|
| 1. | "Kryptonite" | Brad Arnold; Todd Harrell; Matt Roberts | The Better Life (2000) | 4:02 |
| 2. | "When I'm Gone" | Arnold; Harrell; Chris Henderson; Roberts | Away from the Sun (2002) | 4:20 |
| 3. | "Here Without You" | Arnold; Harrell; Henderson; Roberts | Away from the Sun (2002) | 3:55 |
| 4. | "It's Not My Time" | Arnold; Harrell; Henderson; Roberts | 3 Doors Down (2008) | 4:02 |
| 5. | "Let Me Go" | Arnold; Harrell; Henderson; Roberts | Seventeen Days (2005) | 4:03 |
| 6. | "Be Like That" | Arnold; Henderson | The Better Life (2000) | 4:26 |
| 7. | "Loser" | Arnold; Harrell; Roberts | The Better Life (2000) | 4:34 |
| 8. | "Away from the Sun" | Arnold; Harrell; Henderson; Roberts | Away from the Sun (2002) | 3:48 |
| 9. | "Duck and Run" | Arnold; Harrell; Henderson; Roberts | The Better Life (2000) | 3:52 |
| 10. | "One Light" | Arnold; Henderson; Marti Frederiksen | New song | 2:56 |
| 11. | "There's a Life" | Arnold; Harrell; Henderson; Roberts; Dave Bassett | New song | 3:10 |
| 12. | "Goodbyes" | Arnold; Henderson; Frederiksen | New song | 3:50 |
| Total length: | | | | 46:58 |

== Personnel ==
3 Doors Down

- Brad Arnold – lead vocals, drums (tracks 1, 6, 7, 9)
- Todd Harrell – bass guitar
- Matt Roberts – lead guitar (tracks 1–9), rhythm guitar (tracks 1, 6, 7, 9) backing vocals (tracks 2–5, 8, 9)
- Chris Henderson – lead guitar (tracks 1, 6, 7, 9), rhythm guitar (tracks 1–9), backing vocals (tracks 2–5, 8, 9)
- Chet Roberts – lead guitar (tracks 10–12)
- Greg Upchurch – drums (tracks 4, 10–12)
- Josh Freese – drums (tracks 2, 3, 8)
- Daniel Adair – drums (track 5)

Production

- Howard Benson – producer (tracks 10–12)
- Paul Ebersold – producer (tracks 1, 6, 7, 9)
- Johnny K – producer (tracks 4, 5)
- Rick Parashar – producer (tracks 2, 3, 8)
- Sandy Brummels – creative director
- Tom Mackay – A&R
- Scott Sandler – art direction
- Christian Lantry – cover photo
- Kevin Carter, Steven Cohen, Dave Mead, Gary Pettus, Daren Searcy, Ryan Smith, Doug Sonders, Aubrey Wright – interior photos
- Mike Plotnikoff – recording at Sound Kitchen Studios (Nashville, Tennessee) and Bay 7 Studio (Los Angeles, California)
- Jack Joseph Puig – remixing (tracks 1–9) and mixing (tracks 10–12) at Ocean Way Recording (Hollywood, California)
- Ted Jensen – remastering (tracks 1–9) and mastering (tracks 10–12) at Sterling Sound (New York)

== Charts ==
Chart performance for The Greatest Hits
| Chart (2026) | Peak position |
|---|---|
| Canadian Albums (Billboard) | 25 |
| US Billboard 200 | 23 |
| US Top Rock & Alternative Albums (Billboard) | 4 |

== Certifications ==
Certifications and sales for The Greatest Hits
| Region | Certification | Certified units/sales |
|---|---|---|
| United Kingdom (BPI) | Silver | 60,000^{‡} |
^{‡} Sales+streaming figures based on certification alone.
