= American Pie 2 =

2001 film by James B. Rogers

- Theatrical release poster
- Directed by: James B. Rogers
- Screenplay by: Adam Herz
- Story by: Adam Herz; David H. Steinberg
- Based on: Characters by Adam Herz
- Produced by: Chris Moore; Warren Zide; Craig Perry
- Starring: Jason Biggs; Shannon Elizabeth; Alyson Hannigan; Chris Klein; Natasha Lyonne; Thomas Ian Nicholas; Tara Reid; Seann William Scott; Mena Suvari; Eddie Kaye Thomas; Eugene Levy
- Cinematography: Mark Irwin
- Edited by: Larry Madaras; Stuart H. Pappé
- Music by: David Lawrence
- Production companies: LivePlanet; Zide/Perry Productions
- Distributed by: Universal Pictures
- Release date: August 10, 2001
- Running time: 100 minutes
- Country: United States
- Language: English
- Budget: $30 million
- Box office: $287.5 million

American Pie 2 is a 2001 American sex comedy film directed by James B. Rogers and written by Adam Herz and David H. Steinberg from a story by Herz. A sequel to the 1999 comedy film American Pie, it is the second film in the American Pie series and stars Jason Biggs, Shannon Elizabeth, Alyson Hannigan, Chris Klein, Natasha Lyonne, Thomas Ian Nicholas, Tara Reid, Seann William Scott, Mena Suvari, Eddie Kaye Thomas, and Eugene Levy. The film follows the sexual exploits of five friends – Jim, Kevin, Stifler, Oz, and Finch – and their attempts to have the greatest summer party ever at a summer beach house.

American Pie 2 was released in the United States on August 10, 2001 by Universal Pictures, and grossed over $145 million in the United States and $142 million overseas on a budget of $30 million, making it the highest-grossing film in the franchise at $287.5 million worldwide. The film was followed by American Wedding (2003).

== Plot ==
Home for the summer after college, Jim Levenstein, Kevin Myers, Chris "Oz" Ostreicher, and Paul Finch attend Steve Stifler's party until the police shut it down. Kevin is inspired by his brother to rent a Lake Michigan beach house and throw a massive party to close out the summer.

The guys obtain jobs painting houses to afford the rent. Jim receives a call from former love interest Nadia who informs him that she plans to visit. To gain sexual experience, Jim seeks out his prom date Michelle, who agrees to help him after he is mistaken for a mentally disabled trombone prodigy and makes a fool of himself in front of a band camp concert audience.

The group hosts a small party where Kevin and his ex-girlfriend Vicky awkwardly lie to one another regarding the number of sexual partners they have had at college. Oz attempts to have phone sex with his girlfriend Heather while she is studying abroad in Spain but they are interrupted by Stifler.

While painting a house, the guys observe the two female occupants Stifler assumes are lesbians and he enters their home while they are away to find proof. Jim and Finch pursue him inside in an attempt to stop him when the women return home and find the trio inside. They tempt the boys with some quid pro quo sex acts. However, when Stifler exposes his genitals after the women request watching the boys give each other handjobs, Finch and Jim leave in disgust.

Jim visits Michelle again to obtain sexual tips and they are nearly caught by a camp director. Stifler brings the group pornography and Jim later accidentally picks up super glue instead of lubricant. After hospital treatment, he learns his penis will be "unusable" for a short period of time. Meanwhile, Finch has become involved in the art of Tantra and waits to use his new skills with Stifler's mom, whom he mistakenly believes has arrived and is disappointed when he learns it is Stifler's younger brother.

Nadia unexpectedly arrives early, much to the dismay of Jim as his penis has not fully healed. Michelle agrees to pretend to be in a relationship and will later break up. However, she comes to realize that she has fallen for him, but stages a mock breakup the night of the party so that Jim is free to hook up with Nadia. As the party begins, Jim realizes that he loves Michelle, so he lets a disappointed Nadia down gently. Jim rushes to the band camp and interrupts Michelle's concert performance to kiss her onstage, after which they return to the party together.

Meanwhile, Sherman is seduced by Nadia who is attracted to his geeky persona. Kevin is disappointed to learn Vicky has brought a date so he storms off onto the beach. Oz is happy when Heather unexpectedly arrives early. Jim, Oz, and Finch speak to Kevin, who admits he is struggling to move on after high school, but they reassure him and convince him to return to the party.

When the group returns, Kevin apologizes to Vicky, and they all enjoy an evening of partying together. The two "lesbians" arrive to the party and later have a threesome with Stifler.

The next day, the guys are preparing to leave when a car pulls up; Finch approaches and finds it is Stifler's mom. They drive off together and have sex in the car.

== Cast ==
- Jason Biggs as Jim
- Chris Klein as Oz
- Thomas Ian Nicholas as Kevin
- Seann William Scott as Stifler
- Eddie Kaye Thomas as Finch
- Alyson Hannigan as Michelle
- Natasha Lyonne as Jessica
- Tara Reid as Vicky
- Mena Suvari as Heather
- Shannon Elizabeth as Nadia
- Eugene Levy as Jim's Dad
- Chris Owen as Chuck Sherman, "The Sherminator"
- Molly Cheek as Jim's Mom
- Denise Faye as Danielle
- Lisa Arturo as Amber
- John Cho as John
- Justin Isfeld as Justin
- Eli Marienthal as Stifler's Brother
- Casey Affleck as Kevin's Brother
- George Wyner as Camp Director
- Steve Shenbaum as Counselor
- Joelle Carter as Natalie
- JoAnna Garcia as Christy
- Jennifer Coolidge (uncredited) as Stifler's Mom
- Adam Brody as High School Guy (unrated version only)
- Larry Drake as Natalie's father

== Production ==
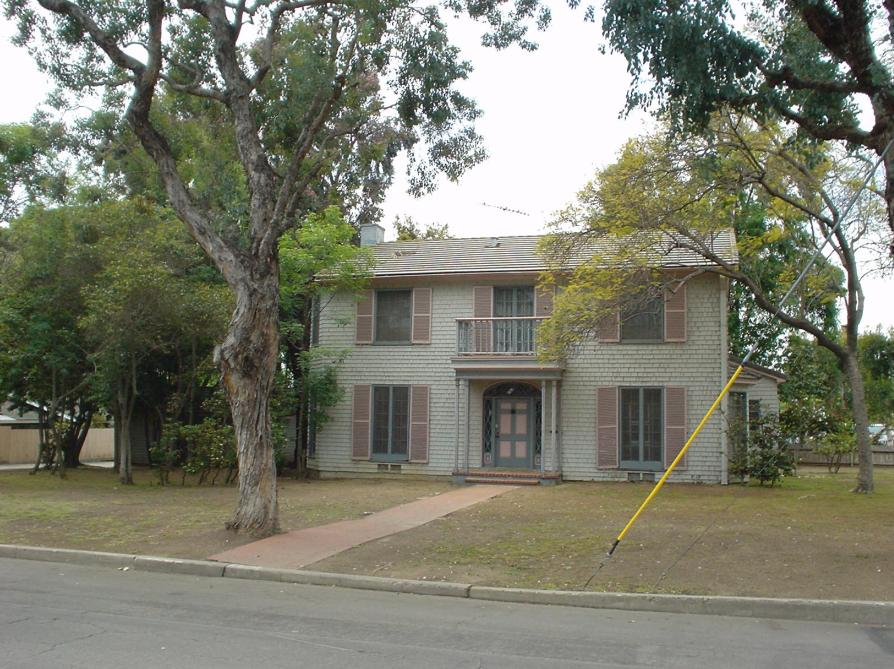
View of Long Beach, California home where the five character friends worked to paint this house yellow while vacationing at a lake.

In January 2000, it was announced that a sequel to American Pie was in the works. James B. Rogers was hired to direct that December, making this his second directed film, after Say It Isn't So. Prior to directing, he served as a first assistant director on the original American Pie, as well as Farrelly brothers comedies such as Dumb and Dumber, Kingpin, There's Something About Mary and Me, Myself & Irene.

Principal photography began on February 14, 2001, and wrapped on April 27. It was filmed in various Southern California cities including Main Street in Seal Beach. Two versions of the film were released: the theatrical version and the unrated version. For the theatrical version, the film was cut slightly with a total of 19 scenes being altered. As a result, American Pie 2 achieved an R rating from the Motion Picture Association of America due to "strong sexual content, crude humor, language and drinking."

In April 2001, it was announced that the film would include a new song produced by 3 Doors Down, a Mississippi band famous for their "Kryptonite", "Loser" and "Duck and Run" songs. The band had made modifications to their "Be Like That" song from their debut album The Better Life to fit in with the film.

== Release ==
=== Home media ===
American Pie 2 was released on VHS and DVD on January 15, 2002. The film was released in two different versions: the theatrical version and the unrated version. They consist of widescreen and fullscreen versions and feature Dolby Digital and DTS audio tracks.

The film debuted on Blu-ray on March 13, 2012, along with the first one and American Wedding.

A 4K Ultra HD Blu-ray release of the film debuted in 2025.

== Reception ==
=== Box office ===
During its opening weekend, American Pie 2 grossed $45.1 million from 3,063 theaters in the United States and Canada, ranking at number one at the box office above Rush Hour 2. Upon opening, it set a record for having the highest opening weekend for an R-rated comedy, surpassing Scary Movie. This would be held until 2008 when it was surpassed by Sex and the City. Overall, the film had the second-highest opening weekend for any R-rated film, behind Hannibal. For 14 years, American Pie 2 would hold the record for having the highest August opening weekend for an R-rated film until Straight Outta Compton took it in 2015. It was the fourth consecutive Universal film of the year to reach $40 million in a single weekend, after The Mummy Returns, The Fast and the Furious and Jurassic Park III. This was also one of the first four consecutive films to approach the $45 million mark in their opening weekends, joining the latter film, Rush Hour 2 and Planet of the Apes. Additionally, the film achieved the largest opening weekend for Jennifer Coolidge's career until A Minecraft Movie beat it in April 2025. American Pie 2 became the first film to top the box office for multiple weeks since Pearl Harbor. It would do so for a total of three weeks before it was overtaken by Jeepers Creepers.

The film's theatrical run wrapped up on December 20, 2001, with a final domestic gross of $145,103,595 and $142,450,000 overseas, adding to a total worldwide gross of $287,553,595. It grossed $8.4 million in its opening weekend in Germany, a record for a comedy and for United International Pictures in the country, beating UIP's previous record set by Jurassic Park. In the UK, the film dethroned Moulin Rouge! to reach the number one spot, earning $8 million. It spent three weeks at the top of the box office before being displaced by The Others.

=== Critical response ===
On review aggregator Rotten Tomatoes, the film has an approval rating of 51% based on 125 reviews, with an average rating of 5.4/10. The website's consensus states: "Being a sequel, American Pie 2 doesn't retain the freshness of the original, nor is it as funny." On Metacritic, the film has a weighted average score of 43 out of 100 based on reviews from 28 critics, indicating "mixed or average" reviews. Audiences surveyed by CinemaScore gave the film an average rating of "B+" on an A+ to F scale.

Roger Ebert gave the film 3 out of 4 stars. In At the Movies, Ebert and Richard Roeper both gave the film "two thumbs up", with Roeper stating that the film had "more laughs than the original". Mark Ramsey said, "Not since There's Something About Mary have I enjoyed such a perfect blend of heart and fart". In a 2 out of 5 review, Harry Guerin from the Irish TV network RTÉ stated that "fans of the first one will come away tasting soggy reheat, not this year's new improved recipe".

== Soundtrack ==
American Pie 2: Music from the Motion Picture
No.	Title	Writer(s)	Producer(s)	Length
1.	"Every Time I Look for You" (Blink-182)	Blink-182	Jerry Finn	3:05
2.	"Scumbag" (Green Day)	Billie Joe Armstrong	Green Day	1:44
3.	"Bring You Down" (Left Front Tire)	Left Front Tire	Rick Beato	2:29
4.	"Vertigo" (American Hi-Fi)	Stacy Jones	American Hi-Fi	2:12
5.	"(I'm Gonna) Split This Room in Half" (Uncle Kracker)	Matt Shafer; Michael Bradford	Mike Bradford; Uncle Kracker	3:04
6.	"Be Like That" (American Pie Edit) (3 Doors Down)	Matt Roberts; Brad Arnold; Todd Harrell	Toby Wright	3:57
7.	"Good (For a Woman)" (Alien Ant Farm)	Alien Ant Farm	Jim Wirt	2:29
8.	"Always Getting Over You" (Angela Ammons)	Sheppard; Kenny Gioia	Sheppard; Kenny Gioia	4:06
9.	"Cheating" (Jettingham)	Jettingham	Barrett Jones	3:47
10.	"Smokescreen" (Flying Blind)	Flying Blind	Todd Herfindal	3:34
11.	"Phoebe Cates" (Fenix*TX)	Fenix*TX	Jerry Finn	3:40
12.	"Susan" (The Exit)	Benjamin Brewer; Aren Gunnar; Jeff DaRosa	Daniel Rey	3:13
13.	"Fat Lip" (Sum 41)	Sum 41	Jerry Finn	3:01
14.	"I Will" (Lucia)	Lucia Cifarelli; Dan Harnett; Eric Kupper	Jim Barton	4:25
15.	"Halo" (Oleander)	Rick Ivanisevich; Thomas Flowers; Doug Eldridge	Rich Mouser	4:42

Europe bonus track
No.	Title	Length
16.	"Here's One for You" (Witness)	3:20

Australasia bonus tracks
No.	Title	Writer(s)	Producer(s)	Length
16.	"Renegade Fighter" (UK Mix) (ZED)	Nathan King; Ben Campbell	David Nicholas	3:20
17.	"Perfect" (Crashpalace)	Marcus Maloney; Dean Thomas; Jeremy Taylor; Ted Hutt	Paul Palmer; Ted Hutt	3:37

=== Year-end charts ===
Year-end chart performance for American Pie 2
Chart (2001)	Peak position
Canadian Albums (Nielsen SoundScan)	121

Chart (2002)	Position
Canadian Alternative Albums (Nielsen SoundScan)	134

=== Certifications ===
Region	Certification	Certified units/sales
Canada (Music Canada)	Gold	50,000^{^}
United Kingdom (BPI)	Silver	60,000^{^}
United States (RIAA)	Gold	500,000^{^}
^{^} Shipments figures based on certification alone.
