= The Better Life =

Studio album by 3 Doors Down
- Released: February 8, 2000
- Recorded: 1999
- Studios: 1999, New York City, New York, U.S.
- Genres: Post-grunge; alternative metal
- Length: 40:55
- Labels: Republic; Universal
- Producer: Paul Ebersold

3 Doors Down chronology
The Better Life (2000)	Away from the Sun (2002)

Singles from The Better Life
- 1. "Kryptonite" Released: January 18, 2000; 2. "Loser" Released: June 26, 2000; 3. "Duck and Run" Released: January 9, 2001; 4. "Be Like That" Released: May 29, 2001

20th Anniversary Edition album cover
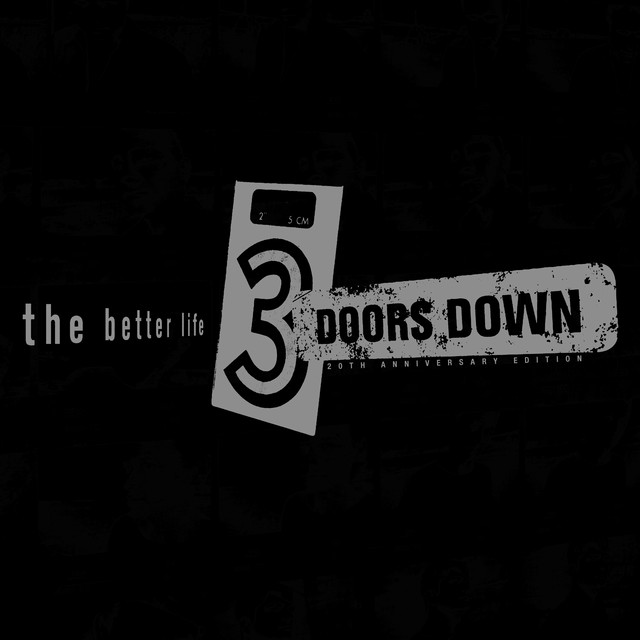

Professional ratings
Review scores
Source	Rating
AllMusic	3/5 stars
Entertainment Weekly	B−
Metal Hammer	8/10
The Phantom Tollbooth	2.5/5 stars
PopMatters	3.4/10
The Rolling Stone Album Guide	3/5 stars
Spin	4/10
The Village Voice	C+

The Better Life is the debut studio album by the American rock band 3 Doors Down, released by Universal Records on February 8, 2000. Three of its four singles—"Kryptonite", "Loser", and "Be Like That"—entered the Billboard Hot 100 chart, peaking at numbers 3, 55, and 24, respectively. The Better Life has sold over seven million copies worldwide and received septuple platinum certification by the RIAA (Recording Industry Association of America) on February 26, 2020. It is the band's only studio album on which lead singer Brad Arnold played drums. Richard Liles played drums as a touring member from 2000 to 2002. Music videos were made for the album's four singles: "Kryptonite", "Loser", "Duck and Run", and "Be Like That".

In 2025, Lauryn Schaffner of Loudwire named the album the best post-grunge release of 2000. To date, rhythm guitarist Chris Henderson is the only musician who played on The Better Life who remains in the band.

== Background and production ==
The band was formed in 1996 in Escatawpa, Mississippi, as a three-piece composed of Brad Arnold on drums and lead vocals, Matt Roberts on lead guitar and backing vocals, and Todd Harrell on bass guitar. The band's earliest material, the song "Kryptonite", was written by Arnold at the age of 15. Arnold was convinced to be the singer after receiving positive feedback from Harrell's girlfriend, and since none of the remaining members had the vocal ability.

3 Doors Down's first performance was at a celebratory event for a friend and, according to Arnold on the band's official website in 2000, the four songs the band played included "one by Bush, one by Metallica and a couple of originals".

In 1997, 3 Doors Down began recording studio material. Their self-titled demo tape was mixed and mastered by Clyde Holly, and released in Spring of that year. Its recording studio, Holly House Recording, was referred to by Arnold as "a pretty decent little studio", and that it "maybe cost us a couple thousand dollars" for the band to record. The demo's track listing is similar to that of The Better Life, with six of the former's songs being re-recorded for the latter. The demo's final track, "Sarah Yellin' 86", was re-recorded as "Sarah Yellin'" on the band's second album, Away from the Sun. Another demo track, "Man in My Mind", was released as "Something in My Mind" on The Better Life's 2023 deluxe edition. Two other tracks on the demo were also re-recorded for the latter year's Away from the Sun: Deluxe Edition.

The first 1,000 copies of the demo CD took "two years" to sell, after which 1,000 more copies were produced and sold in "ten days" due to the success of the band's song "Kryptonite" playing on the WCPR-FM radio station, according to Arnold.

In 1998, Chris Henderson joined 3 Doors Down as the rhythm guitarist after leaving the band Burning Bridges. When discussing how the band got signed to a record label, Arnold said, "Universal and Atlantic came down and talked to us and we wound up signing with Universal". In 1999, a sampler CD with audio clips of six songs from The Better Life was released by Republic Records to promote the album.

In June 2021, 3 Doors Down announced a tour to celebrate The Better Life's twentieth anniversary. During the tour, the album was played in its entirety alongside songs from the band's other albums. The tour began in late June and ended in mid-October 2021.

== Recording ==
The Better Life was recorded in 1999 at Ardent Studios in Memphis, Tennessee, and mixed at The Record Plant in Los Angeles, California. Five songs — "Duck and Run", "Not Enough", "Be Like That", "Better Life", and "So I Need You" — were recorded after the band had been picked up by Universal Records. Two months were spent writing material for The Better Life.

When talking about songs from the band's demo CD and creating material for The Better Life, Arnold said:

We wanted to use about half the songs off that demo, but we needed to write about half another record.

In March 2021, Arnold said about the recording process:

Some songs like "Kryptonite", we strived to make it sound very much like the demo version because we got signed on the back of those demos thanks to our local radio stations in Mississippi from playing those songs, so the last thing we want to do is change it.

== Reissues ==
On September 18, 2007, a two-disc reissue of the album, titled The Better Life: Deluxe Edition, was released including audio of a live performance recorded at Cynthia Woods Mitchell Pavilion in Houston, Texas, on September 18, 2003. The live audio on the 2007 Deluxe Edition reissue is from the Away from the Sun - Live from Houston, Texas DVD, which was released on November 8, 2005. The live audio was also separately released digitally and on streaming services as The Better Life: Rarities Edition in 2010.

On November 4, 2009, 3 Doors Down announced a remastered version of The Better Life on CD and vinyl with new artwork as part of "The Even Better Life Ultimate Fan Pack". The package also included an exclusive band poster, a 3 Doors Down shirt, a digital download of a remastered version of "Kryptonite", and a "Pit Pass" for early access to general admission concerts.

In 2020, a remaster of the album, The Better Life: 20th Anniversary Edition, was released on vinyl, as well as on CD and digitally in 2021; all three versions include the band's eponymous 1997 demo, with the ten songs being listed as the "Escatawpa Sessions." The CD and digital releases of the 20th Anniversary Edition also include acoustic versions of "Kryptonite" and "Be Like That," along with "The Better Life (XX Mix)" and the studio recording of "Wasted Me", as bonus tracks.

== Track listing ==
All lyrics are written by Brad Arnold.

No.	Title	Music	Length
1.	"Kryptonite^{[a]}^{[b]}^{[c]}^{[d]}"	Brad Arnold; Matt Roberts; Todd Harrell	3:54
2.	"Loser^{[c]}"	Arnold; Roberts; Harrell	4:25
3.	"Duck and Run^{[a]}^{[b]}^{[c]}"	Arnold; Roberts; Harrell; Chris Henderson	3:51
4.	"Not Enough"	Arnold; Roberts; Harrell; Henderson	3:14
5.	"Be Like That^{[c]}"	Arnold; Henderson	4:26
6.	"Life of My Own^{1}"	Arnold; Harrell	3:58
7.	"Better Life^{2}"	Arnold; Roberts; Harrell; Henderson	3:07
8.	"Down Poison"	Arnold; Roberts; Harrell	4:21
9.	"By My Side"	Arnold; Roberts; Harrell	3:16
10.	"Smack"	Arnold; Roberts; Harrell	2:29
11.	"So I Need You"	Arnold; Roberts; Harrell; Henderson	3:48
Total length:			40:55

^{a} live recording appears on Another 700 Miles EP (2003)
^{b} appears on A Six Pack of Hits compilation (2008)
^{c} remixed remaster appears on The Greatest Hits compilation (2012)
^{d} acoustic recording appears on Back Porch Jam (2019)

U.S. Best Buy exclusive edition
No.	Title	Length
12.	"Loser (live)" (recorded at Roxy Theatre in Atlanta, Georgia on July 13, 2000, mastered by Tony Gills at The Hit Factory in New York and mixed by Brian Sperber)	5:28
13.	"Life of My Own (live)" (recorded at Roxy Theatre in Atlanta, Georgia on July 13, 2000, mastered by Tony Gills at The Hit Factory in New York and mixed by Brian Sperber)	4:37
14.	"Kryptonite (live acoustic version)" (recorded at WMFS-FM in Memphis, Tennessee on February 14, 2000, mastered by Tony Gills at The Hit Factory in New York)	3:49
Total length:		54:49

Australian/Australasian 2-CD special edition (disc two)
No.	Title	Length
12.	"Loser" (album version)	4:23
13.	"Kryptonite (live acoustic version)" (recorded at WMFS-FM in Memphis, Tennessee on February 14, 2000, mastered by Tony Gills at The Hit Factory in New York)	3:50
14.	"Wasted Me" (produced and mixed by Alex Lifeson at American Sector Studios in New Orleans, Louisiana)	3:09
15.	"By My Side (live)" (recorded at the Paradiso in Amsterdam on September 18, 2000)	3:39
16.	"So I Need You (live)" (recorded at the Paradiso in Amsterdam on September 18, 2000)	3:53
17.	"Kryptonite" (music video)
18.	"Loser" (music video)

European 2-CD special edition (disc two)
No.	Title	Length
12.	"Loser (live)" (recorded at the Paradiso in Amsterdam on September 18, 2000)	5:08
13.	"Duck and Run (live)" (recorded at the Paradiso in Amsterdam on September 18, 2000)	3:54
14.	"Not Enough (live)" (recorded at the Paradiso in Amsterdam on September 18, 2000)	3:08
15.	"By My Side (live)" (recorded at the Paradiso in Amsterdam on September 18, 2000)	3:47
16.	"Be Like That" (acoustic version)	4:26
17.	"Loser" (music video)
18.	"Duck and Run" (music video)

Deluxe Edition bonus disc – U.S. edition (Universal Republic Records – B0008991-02)/digital Rarities Edition
No.	Title	Length
1.	"Duck and Run" (live)	4:42
2.	"The Road I'm On" (live)	3:48
3.	"Kryptonite" (live)	4:22
4.	"Father's Son" (live)	4:32
5.	"Better Life" (live)	3:23
6.	"Away from the Sun" (live)	4:15
7.	"Be Like That" (live)	4:38
8.	"Runnin' Out of Days" (live)	3:36
9.	"Sarah Yellin'" (live)	3:28
10.	"It's Not Me" (live)	3:27
11.	"When I'm Gone" (live)	4:52
12.	"Here Without You" (live)	5:05
13.	"Loser" (live)	5:44
Total length:		55:59

20th Anniversary Edition CD/digital bonus tracks (disc one)
No.	Title	Length
12.	"Kryptonite" (acoustic)	3:50
13.	"Be Like That" (acoustic)	4:25
14.	"The Better Life" (XX mix)	3:05
15.	"Wasted Me" (studio version with harp)	3:12
Total length:		55:28

20th Anniversary Edition "Escatawpa Sessions" demos (disc two)
No.	Title	Length
1.	"Kryptonite" (Escatawpa Sessions)	3:52
2.	"Loser" (Escatawpa Sessions)	3:32
3.	"Life on My Own" (Escatawpa Sessions)	4:40
4.	"Smack" (Escatawpa Sessions)	2:28
5.	"Down Poison" (Escatawpa Sessions)	6:21
6.	"Dead Love" (Escatawpa Sessions)	2:41
7.	"Wasted Me" (Escatawpa Sessions)	2:55
8.	"Man in My Mind" (Escatawpa Sessions)	3:04
9.	"By My Side" (Escatawpa Sessions)	3:16
10.	"Sarah Yellin' 86" (Escatawpa Sessions)	3:29
Total length:		36:23

== Personnel ==
Credits adapted from album liner notes.

3 Doors Down
- Brad Arnold – vocals, drums
- Matt Roberts – guitar
- Chris Henderson – guitar
- Todd Harrell – bass guitar

Additional musicians

- Kevin Paige – keyboards (tracks 2, 3, 5)

Production

- Paul Ebersold – producer, engineer
- Matt Martone – engineer
- Toby Wright – mixing at The Record Plant (Los Angeles, California)
- Mike Butler – mixing assistant
- Stephen Marcussen – mastering at A&M Mastering Studios (Hollywood, California)
- Andrew Garver – digital editing
- Andrew MacNaughtan – photography
- Paul R. Brown – art direction, design at Bau-da Design Lab, Inc.

2007 Deluxe Edition

- Kevin Lee, Noel Lee – executive producers (Monster Music)
- Noel Lee, Ryan Williams – mixing
- Malcolm Harper – live audio engineer
- Assen Stoyanov – second engineer
- Phin Daly, Bill Levenson, Tom Mackay – reissue supervisors
- Daniel Adair – drums (live recordings)
- Gerald McCauley – A&R (Monster Music)
- Vartan Kurjian – art direction
- Meire Murkami – design
- Andrew McNaughtan – digipak photography
- Douglas Sanders – live photography
- Ryan Null – photo coordinator
- Ramon Galbert – product manager
- Shannon Steckloff – production manager
- Recorded September 18, 2003 at Cynthia Woods Mitchell Pavilion (Houston, Texas)
- Mixed at Studio E (Los Angeles) and Westlake Recording (West Hollywood, California)
- Steve Marcussen – mastering at Marcussen Mastering (Hollywood)
- Ryan Miller – re-recording mixer at Pulse Recording (Los Angeles)

20th Anniversary Edition

- Clyde Holly – mixing and recording at Holly House Recording (Biloxi, Mississippi) (original "Escatawpa Sessions" demos, uncredited)
- Tony Gills – remastering at The Cutting Room (New York City, New York)
- Joe Spix – repackage design
- Ashley Harris – product manager
- Alex Sale – production manager
- Josh Graham – art design, layout
- Vartan Kurjian – art direction
- Kristin Biskup, Mike Ruthig – A&R

== Singles ==
- "Kryptonite" – 2000
  - Reached No. 3 on the US Hot 100
  - Reached No. 1 on the US Modern Rock (11 weeks) and US Mainstream Rock (nine weeks)
- "Loser" – July 29, 2000
  - Reached No. 55 on the US Hot 100
  - Reached No. 2 on the US Modern Rock
  - Reached No. 1 on the US Mainstream Rock (21 weeks)
- "Duck and Run" – 2000
  - Reached No. 11 on the US Modern Rock
  - Reached No. 1 on the US Mainstream Rock (three weeks)
- "Be Like That" – May 20, 2001
  - Reached No. 24 on the US Hot 100
  - Reached No. 22 on the US Modern Rock
  - Reached No. 10 on the US Mainstream Rock

== Charts ==
=== Weekly charts ===
Weekly chart performance for The Better Life
Chart (2000–2001)	Peak position
Australian Albums (ARIA)	16
Austrian Albums (Ö3 Austria)	56
Belgian Albums (Ultratop Flanders)	12
Canadian Albums (Billboard)	6
Dutch Albums (Album Top 100)	26
Finnish Albums (Suomen virallinen lista)	23
German Albums (Offizielle Top 100)	45
New Zealand Albums (RMNZ)	19
US Billboard 200	7

=== Year-end charts ===
2000 year-end chart performance for The Better Life
Chart (2000)	Position
Canadian Albums (Billboard)	29
US Billboard 200	18

2001 year-end chart performance for The Better Life
Chart (2001)	Position
Australian Albums (ARIA)	74
Belgian Albums (Ultratop Flanders)	47
Canadian Albums (Billboard)	182
US Billboard 200	43

=== Decade-end charts ===
Decade-end chart performance for The Better Life
Chart (2000–2009)	Position
US Billboard 200	46

== Certifications ==
Certifications for The Better Life
Region	Certification	Certified units/sales
Australia (ARIA)	Platinum	70,000^{^}
Canada (Music Canada)	2× Platinum	200,000^{^}
Germany (BVMI)	Gold	150,000^{‡}
New Zealand (RMNZ)	Platinum	15,000^{‡}
United Kingdom (BPI)	Silver	60,000^{‡}
United States (RIAA)	7× Platinum	7,000,000^{‡}
^{^} Shipments figures based on certification alone.^{‡} Sales+streaming figures based on certification alone.

== Appearances ==
- "Duck and Run" was featured on the soundtrack to the movie The Hole in 2001.
- A recording of "Be Like That" with alternate lyrics was featured on the soundtrack to the film American Pie 2 in 2001.

== Notes ==
^{1.} Titled "Life on My Own" on the physical 20th Anniversary Edition.

^{2.} Titled "The Better Life" on the physical 20th Anniversary Edition.
