= Another 700 Miles =

EP by 3 Doors Down
- Released: November 11, 2003
- Recorded: August 8, 2003
- Venues: Congress Theater (Chicago, Illinois)
- Genre: Alternative rock
- Length: 28:28
- Label: Universal B0001603-02
- Producer: Brian Sperber

3 Doors Down chronology
Away from the Sun (2002)	Another 700 Miles (2003)	Seventeen Days (2005)

Professional ratings
Review scores
Source	Rating
AllMusic	3/5 stars

Another 700 Miles is a live extended play by American rock band 3 Doors Down. It was released by Universal Records on November 11, 2003. The EP was recorded live on August 8, 2003 at a performance at Congress Theater in Chicago, Illinois during the band's Away from the Sun tour. Another 700 Miles was the band's first release with Daniel Adair on drums after he joined in 2002.

The name of the EP is derived from lyrics in the 3 Doors Down song "I Feel You", which appears on Away from the Sun (2002), the band's second studio album.

Another 700 Miles was certified gold by the RIAA (Recording Industry Association of America), selling 500,000 copies on May 11, 2004.

== Reception ==
AllMusic gave the EP three out of five stars, saying, "3 Doors Down proves to be a quite capable live act" and "not simply another Creed rip-off."

== Track listing ==
All tracks written by Brad Arnold, Todd Harrell, Matt Roberts, and Chris Henderson except for "Kryptonite" by Arnold, Harrell, and Roberts and "That Smell" by Allen Collins and Ronnie Van Zant of Lynyrd Skynyrd.

No.	Title	Length
1.	"Duck and Run"	4:35
2.	"When I'm Gone" (intro)	1:18
3.	"When I'm Gone"	4:21
4.	"Kryptonite"	4:14
5.	"Here Without You"	4:11
6.	"It's Not Me"	3:47
7.	"That Smell" (Lynyrd Skynyrd cover)	6:01
Total length:		28:28

== Personnel ==
Credits adapted from album liner notes.

3 Doors Down

- Brad Arnold – lead vocals
- Matt Roberts – guitar
- Chris Henderson – guitar
- Todd Harrell – bass guitar
- Daniel Adair – drums

Production

- Effanel Music – mobile recording
- Sandy Brummels – creative director
- Brian Sperber – mixing, editing
- Kris Lewis – assistant editor, mixing assistant
- Sara Trygg, Kurt Uenala – additional editing
- Joe Spix – design
- Maayan Zach – cover photography
- Kip Malone – interior photography
- Phin Daly – VIP Pass photography
- Tom Mackay, Sinji Suzuki – A&R
- George Marino – mastering at Sterling Sound (New York City, New York)
- Recorded August 8, 2003 at Congress Theater (Chicago, Illinois)

== Charts ==
=== Weekly charts ===
Weekly chart performance for Another 700 Miles
Chart (2003)	Peak position
US Billboard 200	21

=== Year-end charts ===
Year-end chart performance for Another 700 Miles
Chart (2004)	Position
US Billboard 200	178

== Certifications ==
Certifications for Another 700 Miles
Region	Certification	Certified units/sales
United States (RIAA)	Gold	500,000^{^}
^{^} Shipments figures based on certification alone.
