= Justin Biltonen =

American musician

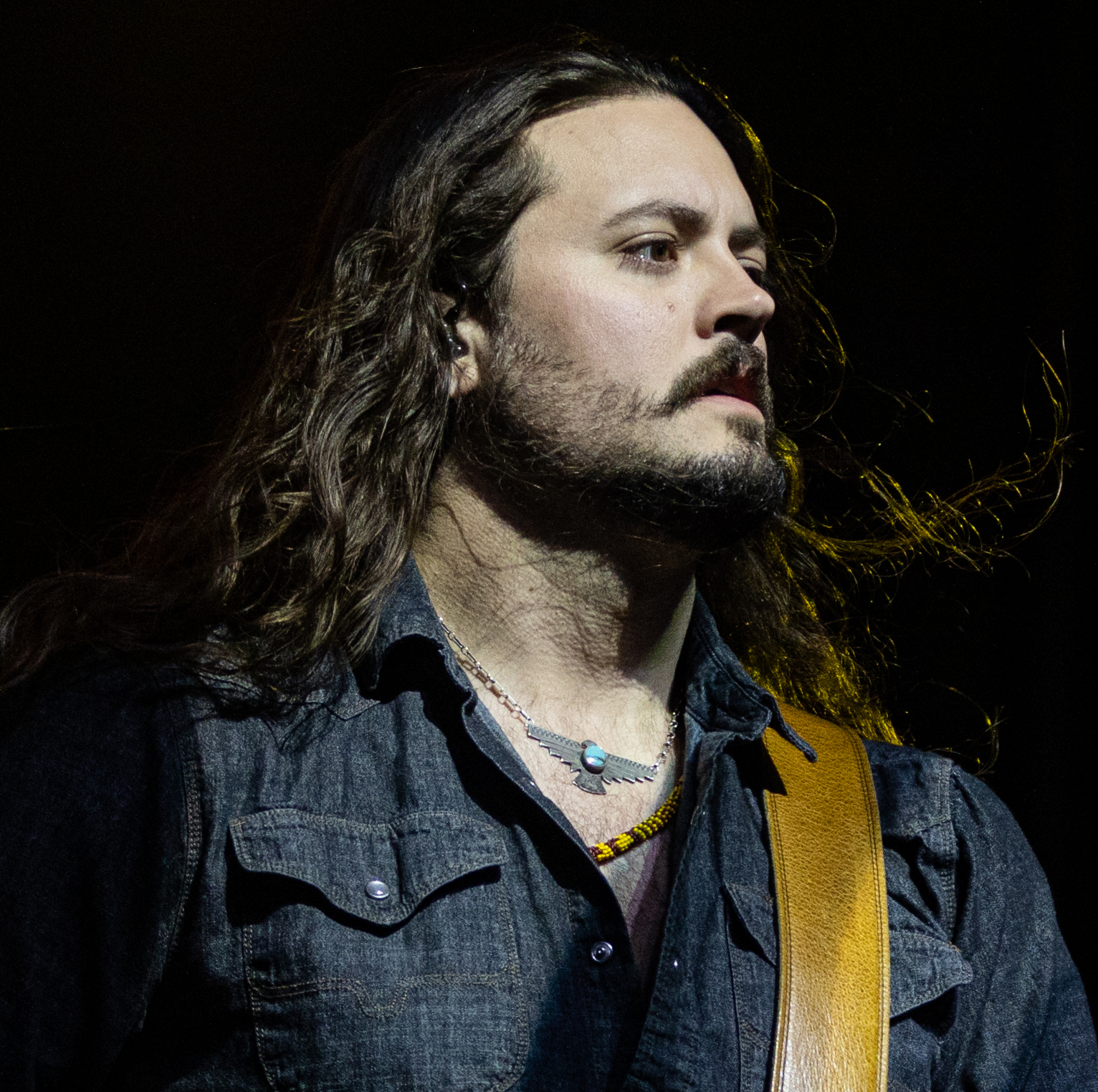
- Biltonen in 2023

Background information
- Born: Justin Charles Biltonen
- Origin: North Carolina, United States
- Genres: Alternative rock; southern rock; country; Americana
- Occupations: Musician; singer; songwriter
- Instruments: Bass; vocals
- Years active: 2004–present
- Member of: 3 Doors Down

Justin Charles Biltonen is an American musician and singer-songwriter. He is best known as the bassist for the rock band 3 Doors Down, having replaced Todd Harrell in 2013. Since 2026, he has also been the band's lead vocalist, following the death of Brad Arnold. Biltonen has additionally pursued a solo career in country music.

== Biography ==
=== Early life and career ===
Biltonen was raised in North Carolina, where he began playing music the age of 10. He performed in church worship groups as a child and later played in punk, rock, and Southern rock bands during high school.

After graduating, he toured with a rock band he formed with friends, playing bars and small venues across the country. His early group later secured management and opened shows for artists including Slash and Korn.

=== 3 Doors Down ===
Biltonen joined 3 Doors Down in 2013, taking over bass duties following the departure of Todd Harrell.

His first studio album with the band was Us and the Night (2016), the group's sixth release. The album reached number two on the Billboard Top Rock Albums chart.

In 2016, shortly before the album's release, founding guitarist Matt Roberts died at age 37. Biltonen later described that period as a moment that reshaped his outlook, both personally and creatively. He contributed to the songwriting on Us and the Night, calling it the first major project where he felt he fully contributed as both a player and writer.

=== Solo career ===
Although active in rock music for much of his career, Biltonen grew up listening to country music and later returned to those influences. He began writing in Nashville and eventually relocated there, working with songwriter James House to refine his approach to melody, structure, and storytelling.

He launched a solo country project with singles including "Use You", "How A Man’s Made", and "She's Got the Highway". His single "Wild Mustangs" expanded his audience within the country scene.

"Heartache Rodeo", recorded with actress Siobhan Fallon Hogan, appeared in the 2023 film Shelter in Solitude. His music has also been featured in documentaries, including Lane – Life, Legend, Legacy. In addition to recording, Biltonen performs acoustic solo shows made up largely of original material, along with selected cover songs.

== Discography ==
=== With 3 Doors Down ===
- Us and the Night (2016)

=== Solo works ===
- "Use You" (2018)
- "How A Man's Made" (2018)
- "She's Got the Highway" (2018)
- "Wild Mustangs" (2020)
- "Heartache Rodeo" (2021)
- "Workin Thang" (2023)
