= Away from the Sun =

Studio album by 3 Doors Down
- Released: November 12, 2002
- Recorded: 2002
- Studios: London Bridge (Seattle, Washington); Greenhouse (Burnaby, British Columbia); Ocean Way (Hollywood, California)
- Genres: Post-grunge; alternative metal
- Length: 41:36
- Label: Universal
- Producer: Rick Parashar

3 Doors Down chronology
The Better Life (2000)	Away from the Sun (2002)	Another 700 Miles (2003)

Singles from Away from the Sun
- 1. "When I'm Gone" Released: September 23, 2002; 2. "The Road I'm On" Released: March 17, 2003; 3. "Here Without You" Released: July 28, 2003; 4. "Away from the Sun" Released: January 12, 2004

Away from the Sun is the second studio album by the American rock band 3 Doors Down, released by Universal Records on November 12, 2002. Three of its four singles—"When I'm Gone", "Here Without You", and "Away from the Sun"—entered the Billboard Hot 100, peaking at numbers four, five, and 62, respectively. The album received quadruple platinum certification by the Recording Industry Association of America (RIAA) on August 4, 2006.

== Background and production ==
The Away from the Sun recording sessions took place during the summer of 2002 with producer and engineer Rick Parashar at London Bridge Studio in Seattle, Washington. Alex Lifeson, guitarist for the Canadian rock band Rush, performed live with 3 Doors Down in Biloxi, Mississippi during the premiere party for Away from the Sun. The album has sold eight million copies worldwide, including over four million in the US alone.

A two-disc Limited Edition version of the album was released in 2002 with a bonus DVD that included live video footage of the band, a behind-the-scenes "Making of" video about the album, 5.1 audio recordings of the songs "Dangerous Game" and "When I'm Gone", and the music videos "Kryptonite," "Loser," "Duck and Run," and "Be Like That" from the band's 2000 debut album The Better Life.

In September 2023, vocalist Brad Arnold said about Away from the Sun:

I think it will always be my favorite record of ours that we made. There were just a lot of emotions I had that were ready to come out.

He also added that:

There are more of my adult feelings and emotions in Away from the Sun than there was on The Better Life. I was only twenty-three when we wrote [the former album], but I had already seen and done a lot. Whereas with The Better Life, I wrote those songs when I was a kid; I was literally a kid, I was sixteen when I wrote "Kryptonite". Away from the Sun was our first record we wrote as a band ... "a professional band". The first record, I didn't really have a place that I could put my finger on where I wrote all those songs together.

== DualDisc version ==
Away from the Sun was included among a group of 15 DualDisc releases that were test marketed in two cities: Boston, Massachusetts and Seattle, Washington. The test market DualDisc version of the album is rare. In 2005, the DualDisc version was reissued in a more widely distributed version. The original test market version differs from this common version in both packaging elements and in the design of the back of the inlay card.

The DualDisc has the standard CD album on one side and a DVD-Audio/DVD-Video on the second side. The DVD-Audio portion contains the entire album in advanced resolution 5.1 PCM surround sound and 2.0 PCM stereo. The PCM audio was recorded at 96 kHz and 24bit for both audio tracks, but the 5.1 audio track is at 13,824 kbit/s and the 2.0 audio track is at 4,608 kbit/s. Special features for the DVD-Audio include the band's biography, a photo gallery, and lyrics for all the tracks except "This Time". The DVD-Video portion contains the entire album in 5.1 Dolby Digital surround sound and 2.0 Dolby Digital stereo. The DVD side also features the music video for the single "The Road I'm On" directed by The Malloys.

== 2023 Deluxe Edition ==
Away from the Sun: Deluxe Edition, a remastered version of the album with ten bonus tracks, was released on August 11, 2023. The extra songs include early studio recordings of "Dangerous Game," "Dead Love," and "Wasted Me," a live early recording of "When I'm Gone," a demo version of "Here Without You," a cover of "That Smell" by Lynyrd Skynyrd (from the U.S. "The Road I'm On" single), "Living a Lie" (from the Australian and European versions of the "When I'm Gone" single), the previously released bonus tracks "This Time" and "Pop Song," a re-recorded version of the band's 1997 demo track "Man in My Mind" titled "Something in My Mind," and the exclusive song "Long Day."

== Track listing ==
All songs written by 3 Doors Down except "Dangerous Game" and "Sarah Yellin'" by Arnold, Roberts and Harrell, and "That Smell" by Allen Collins and Ronnie Van Zant of Lynyrd Skynyrd.

No.	Title	Length
1.	"When I'm Gone"	4:21
2.	"Away from the Sun"	3:53
3.	"The Road I'm On"	3:59
4.	"Ticket to Heaven"	3:27
5.	"Running Out of Days"	3:30
6.	"Here Without You"	3:58
7.	"I Feel You"	4:07
8.	"Dangerous Game"	3:35
9.	"Changes"	3:56
10.	"Going Down in Flames"	3:28
11.	"Sarah Yellin'"	3:17
Total length:		41:36

Hidden bonus track
No.	Title	Length
12.	"This Time" (song plays after 29 seconds of silence)	5:18
Total length:		46:55

Japanese edition
No.	Title	Length
12.	"Pop Song" (bonus track)	3:11
13.	"This Time" (hidden track)	4:50

UK special edition
No.	Title	Length
12.	"Pop Song" (bonus track)	3:11
13.	"Kryptonite" (from The Better Life)	3:54
14.	"This Time" (hidden track)	4:50

2002 Limited Edition bonus DVD
No.	Title	Length
1.	"live" (video)
2.	"Kryptonite" (music video)
3.	"Loser" (music video)
4.	"Duck and Run" (music video)
5.	"Be Like That" (music video)
6.	"The Making of Away from the Sun"
7.	"Dangerous Game" (5.1 audio)
8.	"When I'm Gone" (5.1 audio)

2023 digital Deluxe Edition bonus tracks
No.	Title	Writer(s)	Length
12.	"This Time"		4:50
13.	"Long Day"		3:38
14.	"That Smell" (Lynyrd Skynyrd cover)	Allen Collins; Ronnie Van Zant	5:48
15.	"Something in My Mind"		3:18
16.	"Living a Lie"		3:34
17.	"Pop Song"		3:10
18.	"Dangerous Game" (Early version)		3:59
19.	"Dead Love" (Early version)		3:05
20.	"Wasted Me" (Early version)		3:09
21.	"Here Without You" (Demo)		3:45
22.	"When I'm Gone" (Live early version)		4:01
Total length:			83:53

== Music videos ==
1. "When I'm Gone" (two versions)
2. "The Road I'm On"
3. "Here Without You"
4. "Away from the Sun"
5. "Pop Song"

== Personnel ==
3 Doors Down

- Brad Arnold – vocals
- Matt Roberts – lead guitar, backing vocals
- Chris Henderson – guitar, backing vocals
- Todd Harrell – bass guitar

Additional musicians

- Josh Freese – drums
- David Campbell – strings
- Rick Hopkins – Hammond B3
- Matthew Burgess – percussion

Production

- Zach Blackstone – assistant
- David Campbell – string arrangements, orchestral arrangement, string conductor, concertmaster
- Sandy Brummels – creative director
- Steve Churchyard – engineer
- Joel Derouin – concertmaster
- Ted Jensen – mastering
- David Hathaway – butterfly image (courtesy of NASA/NSSTC)
- Suzie Katayama – orchestra manager
- Dean Maher – engineer, digital editing, mixing assistant
- George Marino – mastering
- Frank Ockenfels – photography
- Geoff Ott – engineer, digital editing, overdub engineer
- Rick Parashar – producer, engineer, digital editing
- Bill Richards – product manager
- Paul Silveira – mixing assistant
- Honchol Sin – assistant engineer, assistant
- Gordon Sran – assistant, overdub assistant
- Randy Staub – mixing
- Tom Sweeney – assistant engineer, assistant
- Latif Tayour – assistant engineer, assistant, overdub assistant
- Karen Walker – art direction, design

Limited Edition DVD

- Jeff Panzer – director ("Live")
- L2 Digital – production company ("Live")
- Lennon Golden – producer ("Live")
- Enid Zentelis – director and producer ("The Making of Away from the Sun")
- EZ Entertainment – production company ("The Making of Away from the Sun")
- Tom Derr – product manager
- Tom Mackay – A&R
- Kevin Flynn, Brian Holzknecht – graphics, motion menus
- Charlie Holzknecht – author, encoding at L2 Digital (Burbank, California)

== Reception ==
Professional ratings
Review scores
Source	Rating
AllMusic	3/5 stars
Entertainment Weekly	C
musicOMH	mixed
Rolling Stone	mixed

As with their debut album, critical reception of Away from the Sun remained generally mixed. Praise came from its earnesty and raw aggression, while its lyrical themes were disparaged for being too morbid, depressing, or otherwise "self-pitying". Bob Waliszewski of the website PluggedIn wrote that "Unlike the band’s last disc, this one views hard times with less melancholy and more ambition to affect change. Away From the Sun offers 3DD fans a ray of hope, yet gets burned by a few disappointing turns".

Johnny Lofton of AllMusic gave album three out of five stars, saying: "the band doesn't yet have the hooks to remain consistently interesting for an entire album. Besides the unstoppable melody of the title track, and 'Ticket to Heaven,' which shows some real songwriting depth in comparison to the band's debut, many of Away from the Sun's 11 tracks sound too similar. It's an accomplished, often rocking, and sometimes genuinely emotional set, but there just isn't enough variety to sustain it."

Independent music website Music Immortal wrote in a retrospective 2009 review: "Something tells me this album came from a very low, depressed place. A lot of the songs on the album speak of loneliness or emptiness, and its definitely one of those albums you would turn on when you want to be reminded that others feel the same way sometimes."

== Charts ==
=== Weekly charts ===
Weekly chart performance for Away from the Sun
Chart (2002–2004)	Peak position
Australian Albums (ARIA)	8
Austrian Albums (Ö3 Austria)	27
Belgian Albums (Ultratop Flanders)	71
Danish Albums (Hitlisten)	2
Dutch Albums (Album Top 100)	25
German Albums (Offizielle Top 100)	28
New Zealand Albums (RMNZ)	11
Swedish Albums (Sverigetopplistan)	16
Swiss Albums (Schweizer Hitparade)	49
US Billboard 200	8

=== Year-end charts ===
2002 year-end chart performance for Away from the Sun
Chart (2002)	Position
Canadian Alternative Albums (Nielsen SoundScan)	84
Canadian Metal Albums (Nielsen SoundScan)	37

2003 year-end chart performance for Away from the Sun
Chart (2003)	Position
US Billboard 200	22
Worldwide Albums (IFPI)	50

2004 year-end chart performance for Away from the Sun
Chart (2004)	Position
Australian Albums (ARIA)	54
Dutch Albums (Album Top 100)	88
Swedish Albums (Sverigetopplistan)	85
US Billboard 200	47

=== Decade-end charts ===
Decade-end chart performance for Away from the Sun
Chart (2000–2009)	Position
US Billboard 200	110

== Certifications ==
Certifications for Away from the Sun
Region	Certification	Certified units/sales
Australia (ARIA)	Platinum	70,000^{^}
Canada (Music Canada)	Platinum	100,000^{^}
Denmark (IFPI Danmark)	2× Platinum	40,000^{‡}
Germany (BVMI)	Gold	150,000^{‡}
New Zealand (RMNZ)	Platinum	15,000^{‡}
United Kingdom (BPI)	Silver	60,000^{‡}
United States (RIAA)	4× Platinum	4,000,000^{^}
^{^} Shipments figures based on certification alone.^{‡} Sales+streaming figures based on certification alone.
