= Be Like That =

Be Like That may refer to:

- "Be Like That" (3 Doors Down song), 2000
- "Be Like That" (Kane Brown, Swae Lee and Khalid song), 2020
