= Away from the Sun (song) =

2004 single by 3 Doors Down

Single by 3 Doors Down

from the album Away from the Sun
- Released: January 12, 2004
- Recorded: 2002
- Studio: London Bridge (Seattle, Washington); Greenhouse (Burnaby, British Columbia); Ocean Way (Hollywood, California)
- Length: 3:53
- Label: Republic; Universal
- Songwriters: Brad Arnold; Todd Harrell; Chris Henderson; Matt Roberts
- Producer: Rick Parashar

3 Doors Down singles chronology
"Here Without You" (2003)	"Away from the Sun" (2004)	"Let Me Go" (2004)

Music video
- "Away from the Sun" on YouTube

"Away from the Sun" is a song by American rock band 3 Doors Down. It was released on January 12, 2004, as the fourth and final single from their second studio album, Away from the Sun (2002). It debuted at No. 6 on the Billboard Bubbling Under Hot 100 and peaked at No. 62 on the Billboard Hot 100 in August of the same year.

== Composition ==
In an interview with SongFacts, lead singer Brad Arnold spoke about the song's meaning:

"Away from the Sun" is just about those days. A really important little phrase is at the beginning of the chorus, it says, 'Now again I found myself so far down.' It's like, yet again I've fallen. It's not like just once you're in a hole, it's like, here I am again. You watch the kid in the [music] video, it's over and over he's at the bottom again. It's like every time he crawls back up someone just pushes him down. And for about a two-to-three year period in my life, I really felt like that. I didn't even feel like climbing up the hill anymore, because every time I climbed up somebody was gonna push me back down it. That song is a reflection of that time period in my life. And thank God it's over. But I just felt away from the sun.

== Music video ==
The music video for "Away from the Sun" was directed by Noble Jones.

The video begins with a young boy (played by Brad Arnold's nephew) attempting to climb a mountain with boulders strapped to his ankles with ropes. As he climbs, a man rushes up to him and begins scolding the boy. The boy then falls down the mountain. As he falls, a group of schoolgirls look on. Most of them laugh at him, with the exception of one girl who silently stares with a blank expression on her face. Afterwards, the boy attempts to climb the mountain again. This time, however, a group of men begin throwing stones at the boy, except for one man who stares blankly at the boy and drops his stone. The boy then sees a woman dressed in white ahead of him, but the man from earlier in the video reappears and punches him down to the base of the mountain. As he reflects on the events that had transpired, the sun begins to rise over the mountain range on the horizon. Finally, the boy once again attempts to scale the mountain. He again sees the woman dressed in white, and he continues to climb to the top of the mountain. The scene cuts to the boy climbing the mountain from afar before the sunlight consumes the screen and the video ends.

== Track listings ==
European CD single

1. "Away from the Sun" – 3:51
2. "Away from the Sun" (acoustic) – 3:45

European maxi-CD single

1. "Away from the Sun" – 3:51
2. "Away from the Sun" (acoustic) – 3:45
3. "Kryptonite (live)" – 4:11
4. "Away from the Sun" (video) – 3:45

Australian CD single

1. "Away from the Sun" – 3:53
2. "The Road I'm On" – 4:01
3. "When I'm Gone" – 4:23
4. "Kryptonite" (live) – 4:11

== Charts ==
=== Weekly charts ===
Weekly chart performance for "Away from the Sun"
Chart (2004)	Peak position
Australia (ARIA)	51
Netherlands (Dutch Top 40)	35
Netherlands (Single Top 100)	41
New Zealand (Recorded Music NZ)	44
Russia Airplay (TopHit)	180
US Billboard Hot 100	62
US Adult Contemporary (Billboard)	29
US Adult Pop Airplay (Billboard)	5
US Alternative Airplay (Billboard)	33
US Mainstream Rock (Billboard)	20
US Pop Airplay (Billboard)	25

=== Year-end charts ===
Year-end chart performance for "Away from the Sun"
Chart (2004)	Position
US Adult Top 40 (Billboard)	15

== Certifications ==
Certifications for "Away from the Sun"
Region	Certification	Certified units/sales
United States (RIAA)	Gold	500,000^{*}
^{*} Sales figures based on certification alone.

== Release history ==
Release dates and formats for "Away from the Sun"
Region	Date	Format(s)	Label(s)	Ref.
United States	January 12, 2004	Mainstream rock; active rock; alternative radio	Republic; Universal	
United States	February 9, 2004	Hot adult contemporary; contemporary hit radio	Republic; Universal	
Australia	April 5, 2004	CD	Republic; Universal	
Europe	July 19, 2004	CD	Republic; Universal	
