= The Florida SpringFest =

Coordinates: 29.21766°N 82.05520°W

The Florida SpringFest is a three-day annual showcase in popular music acts, both local and national, in downtown Pensacola, Florida. The Florida SpringFest is traditionally held anywhere from mid-May until early June.

The event was founded in 1991, when Pensacola businessman Bill Dollarhide funded much of the expense out of his own pocket so up-and-coming local acts could reach a wider audience. In turn, part of the revenues were given to the Alzheimer's Foundation, to which Dollarhide donated regularly. The festival regularly donated parts of its proceeds to nonprofit groups.

In the years since, Dollarhide turned the management over to a board of directors and full-time staff. Under the direction of Michelle Sarra and Geoff Fairchild, the event grew to sell-out crowds as they decided to incorporate bigger names to bring more crowds.

The novelty of SpringFest is its setting right in the heart of downtown. For all three days, multiple blocks are cordoned off to cars, and large stages are set up on street corners. Multiple acts play at any given time throughout the day, with the best-known acts saved for evening performances. The anticipation for SpringFest is large in the community, with the Pensacola News Journal dedicating an entire issue of their Weekender lifestyles magazine to the event.

In 2004, new management moved the festival to an indoor location. They reverted the move the following year, but could not recoup profits, and the festival was not held after 2006.
