= 3 Doors Down =

American rock band

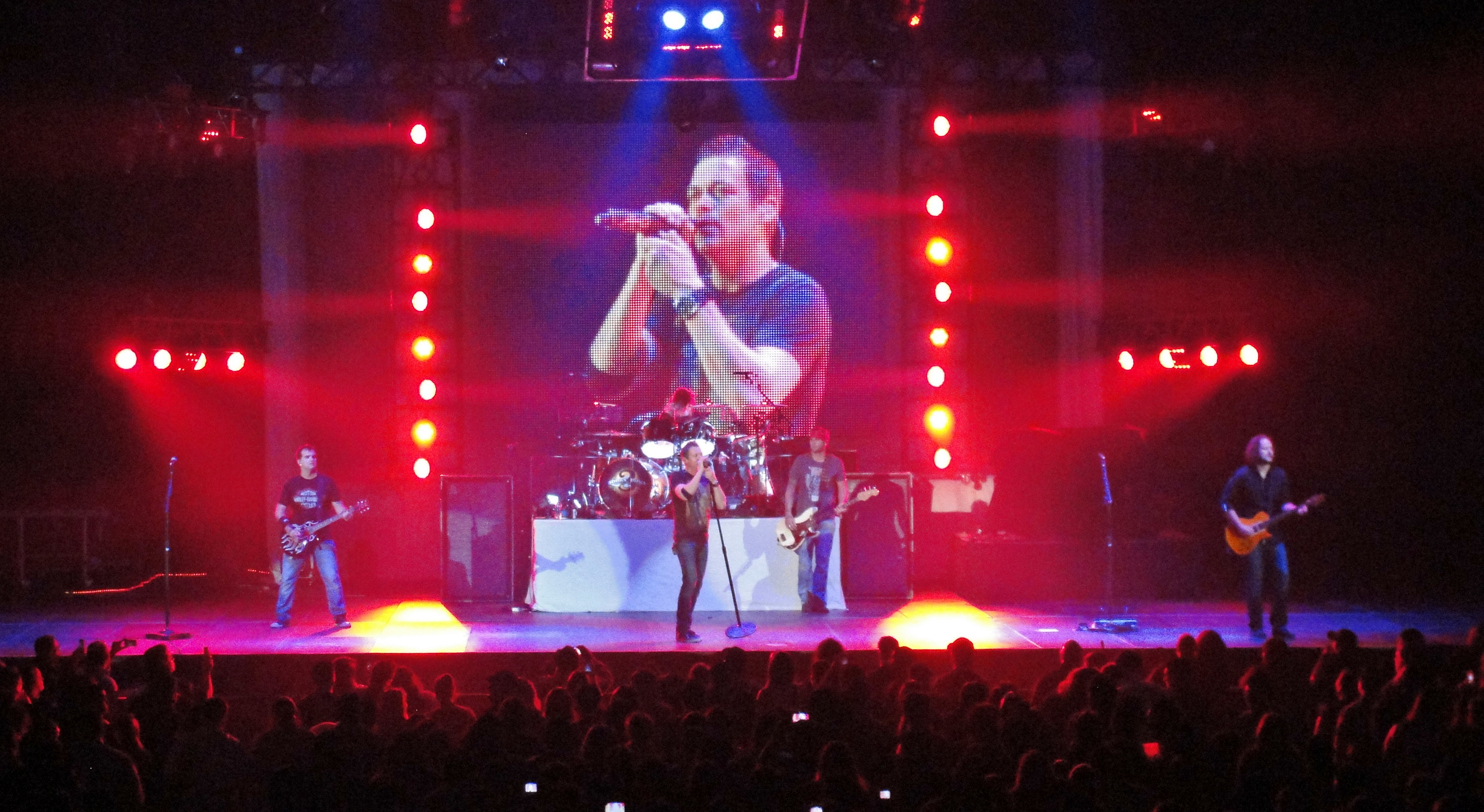
- 3 Doors Down performing in Laredo, Texas, in 2012

Background information
- Origin: Escatawpa, Mississippi, U.S.
- Genres: Post-grunge; hard rock; alternative rock
- Works: 3 Doors Down discography
- Years active: 1996–present
- Labels: Republic; Universal
- Members: Chris Henderson; Greg Upchurch; Chet Roberts; Justin Biltonen
- Past members: Brad Arnold; Matt Roberts; Todd Harrell; Richard Liles; Daniel Adair
- Website: 3doorsdown.com
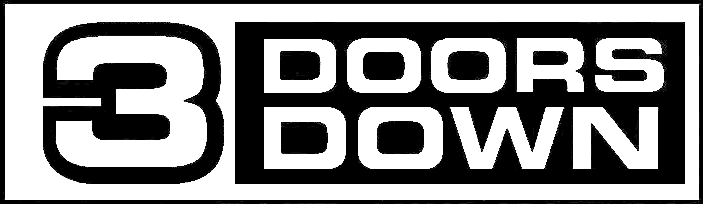

3 Doors Down is an American rock band formed in Escatawpa, Mississippi, in 1996. The band's founding members were Brad Arnold (lead vocals and drums), Matt Roberts (guitar and backing vocals), and Todd Harrell (bass). The band's music has been described as a mixture of post-grunge, hard rock and alternative rock.

3 Doors Down achieved mainstream popularity with their 2000 debut single, "Kryptonite", which peaked at number three on the Billboard Hot 100. The song preceded their debut album, The Better Life (2000), which became the 11th-best-selling album of that year, received septuple platinum certification by the Recording Industry Association of America (RIAA), and spawned two additional Billboard Hot 100 entries: "Loser" and "Be Like That". Their second album, Away from the Sun (2002), continued the band's success, debuting at number eight on the Billboard 200 and spawning the Billboard Hot 100 top-five singles "When I'm Gone" and "Here Without You".

The band's third and fourth studio albums, Seventeen Days (2005) and their self-titled fourth album (2008), both debuted atop the Billboard 200 and received platinum certifications by the RIAA. The band's fifth album, Time of My Life (2011), peaked at number three, and their sixth album, Us and the Night (2016), peaked at number 14.

The band is without any of its three founding members, leaving rhythm guitarist Chris Henderson (who joined 3 Doors Down in 1998) as the only member from The Better Life lineup remaining. Bassist Todd Harrell left the band in 2013 after a vehicular homicide charge, lead guitarist Matt Roberts died in 2016 from a drug overdose, and lead singer Brad Arnold died in 2026 from kidney cancer. The current lineup consists of Henderson, drummer Greg Upchurch, lead guitarist Chet Roberts and bassist/lead singer Justin Biltonen.

== History ==
=== Formative years: 1996–1998 ===
3 Doors Down was formed in 1996 by Escatawpa, Mississippi, natives Brad Arnold (lead vocals and drums), Matt Roberts (guitar and backing vocals), and Todd Harrell (bass). While the trio were walking through the town of Foley, Alabama, during a trip there, they noticed a building where some letters had fallen off its sign, reading "Doors Down". Since the band consisted of three people at the time, they added the number 3 to create "3 Doors Down".

Arnold wrote the band's breakout hit single, "Kryptonite", in high school during math class at age 15.

The three-piece began to record demo material in 1997. The demo recording sessions took place at the Holly House Recording studio in Biloxi, Mississippi. The band's demo songs were mixed and recorded by Clyde Holly, with the recordings being released on a self-titled CD in 1997. 1,000 copies of the demo CD were released initially, with 1,000 more copies being released two years later. When the band gave the CD to local radio station WCPR-FM, they started playing the demo recording of "Kryptonite" and it became the number one requested song on the station for over 15 weeks. The station's program director sent the song to manager Phin Daly who in turn showed it to Bill McGathy, his employer at In De Goot Entertainment.

In 1998, two years after the band formed, Harrell asked rhythm guitarist Chris Henderson, who was previously in a band named Burning Bridges, to join the group. The band was booked in New York to perform a showcase at the CBGB music club. Daly told HitQuarters: "Once they got on stage and started playing it was apparent the magic was in the music. So we moved to sign them."

=== Mainstream success: 1999–2004 ===
3 Doors Down's first studio album, The Better Life, was released on February 8, 2000. It went on to become the 11th best-selling album of the year, selling over four million copies. It was certified septuple platinum by the Recording Industry Association of America (RIAA) on February 26, 2020, signifying over seven million units sold in the United States, thanks in large part to the international hit singles "Kryptonite", "Loser", and "Duck and Run". Released in April 2000, "Kryptonite" reached number three on the charts and became the band's breakout hit, receiving a Grammy nomination for Best Rock Song. A fourth single, "Be Like That" was re-recorded for the 2001 film American Pie 2, with alternate lyrics for the first three lines; this version is known as the "American Pie 2 Edit". While recording the album, Brad Arnold recorded both the vocal and drum tracks. The band hired drummer Richard Liles for the tour in support of The Better Life so that Arnold could perform at the front of the stage. Liles left the group and was later replaced by Canadian percussionist Daniel Adair, who toured with them and did studio sessions.

The band's second studio album, Away from the Sun, was released on November 30, 2002, and peaked at number eight on the charts. The album produced the singles "When I'm Gone", "Here Without You", and "The Road I'm On". Away from the Sun went platinum within two months of release and eventually went multi-platinum; it sold four million copies worldwide, including well over three million in the US. "When I'm Gone" received Grammy nominations for Best Rock Song and Best Rock Performance By A Duo Or Group With Vocal, respectively. Session drummer Josh Freese was hired to record drums for the album. Rush guitarist Alex Lifeson produced and performed on three tracks for the record, "Dangerous Game", "Dead Love", and "Wasted Me", but only "Dangerous Game" would appear on the finished product. The band hired Canadian Daniel Adair to play drums for the Away From the Sun tour. He would go on to record the drums for the band's next studio release, and was with the band aboard the USS George Washington (CVN-73) to film the music video "When I'm Gone".

In 2003, 3 Doors Down released a live EP entitled Another 700 Miles consisting of recordings from a live performance by the band in Chicago, Illinois. Another 700 Miles has since been certified Gold in the US. In addition to featuring some of 3 Doors Down's hit singles from their previous two albums, the EP also contains a version of the 1977 Lynyrd Skynyrd song "That Smell". The group toured with Nickelback in 2004.

In 2003, the band began hosting the annual "3 Doors Down and Friends" benefit concert through the band's own charity, The Better Life Foundation. In 2006, this event was held at the Mobile Convention Center, with proceeds benefiting Hurricane Katrina survivors. As residents of Escatawpa, the members of the band saw the effects of Katrina's devastation.

=== Continued success: 2005–2010 ===
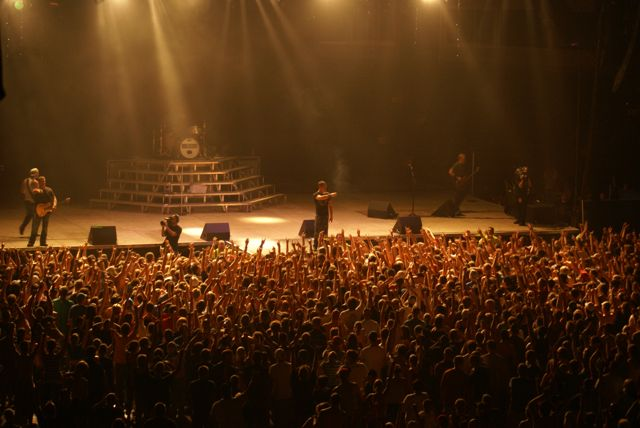
3 Doors Down performing in 2008

By 2005, the band had sold 12 million albums. The band's third studio album, Seventeen Days, was released on February 8, 2005, and debuted at number 1 on the Billboard 200 and has been certified platinum. It contains five singles, "Let Me Go", "Behind Those Eyes" (which achieved major chart success), "Live for Today", "Landing in London" (on which Bob Seger sang the second verse and provided back-up vocals), and "Here by Me". During the Seventeen Days tour, the band appeared alongside southern rock band Lynyrd Skynyrd, as well as headlining many shows of their own.

The band later released a live DVD entitled Away from the Sun: Live from Houston, Texas. The DVD was produced and directed by Alex Gibney and Doug Biro. It features songs from both The Better Life and Away from the Sun, and even some early sketches of "It's Not Me" and "Father's Son", which were both eventually released on Seventeen Days.

Greg Upchurch, formerly of Puddle of Mudd, replaced Daniel Adair, when Adair left to become drummer and contributing member of Nickelback.

3 Doors Down released their self-titled fourth album on May 20, 2008. It debuted at number 1 on the Billboard 200, selling 154,000 copies in its first week. It became the band's second consecutive number 1 album on the chart after Seventeen Days, as well their fourth album to reach the Top Ten. The album contains the hit singles "It's Not My Time", "Train", "Let Me Be Myself" and "Citizen/Soldier", a song written as a tribute to the National Guard. The album went on to be certified platinum.

In 2009, 3 Doors Down, along with The Soul Children of Chicago, released the song "In the Presence of the Lord" on the compilation album Oh Happy Day: An All-Star Music Celebration.

The band recorded a Christmas song called "Where My Christmas Lives", which was the first Christmas song Brad Arnold had written. It was digitally released along with seven acoustic songs on December 8. Six of these acoustic tracks were from the previous self-titled album, and one was an acoustic version of "Where My Christmas Lives".

=== Lineup changes: 2011–2013 ===
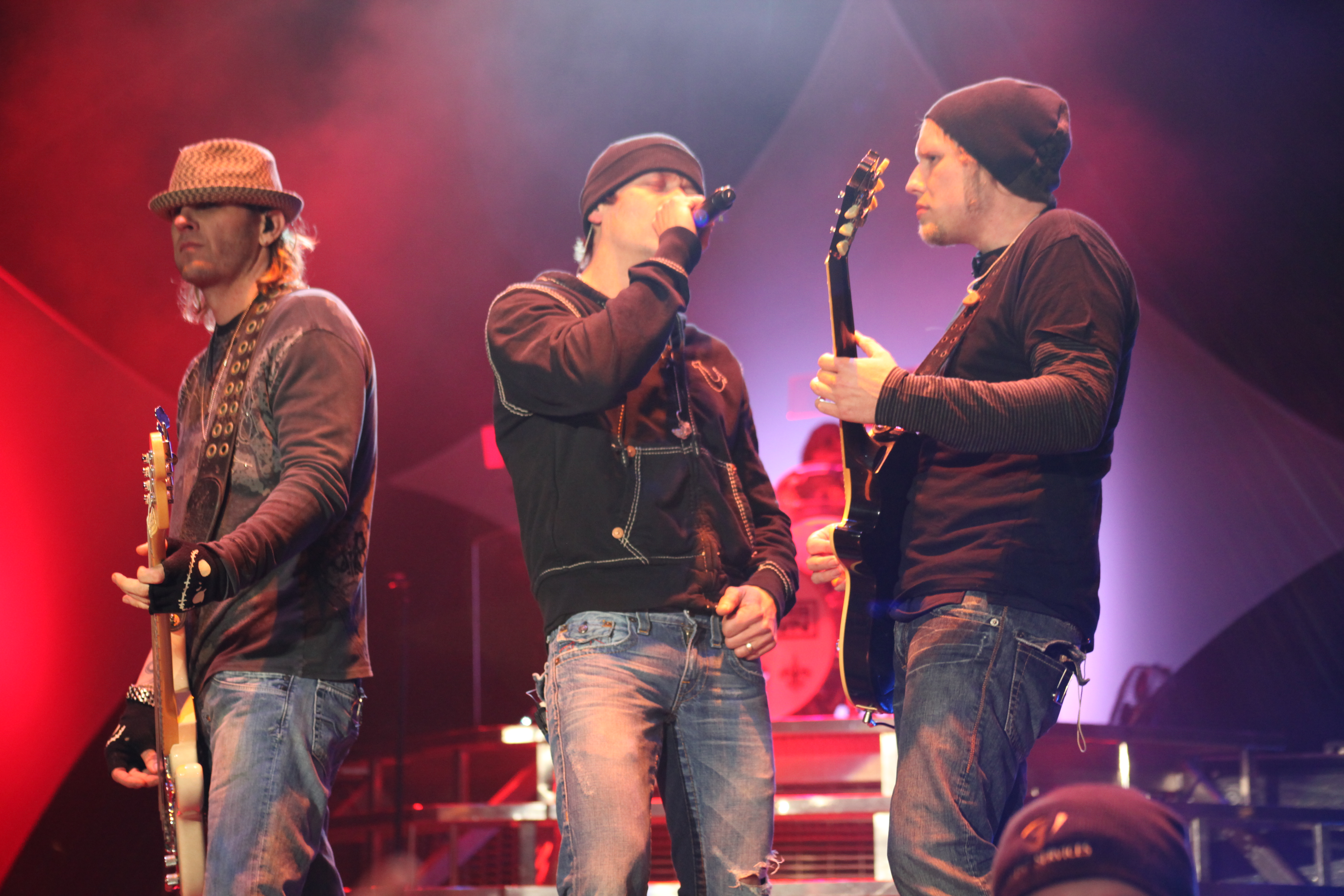
Todd Harrell, Brad Arnold and Matt Roberts performing in 2011

3 Doors Down released their fifth studio album, Time of My Life, on July 19, 2011. The band had previously released "When You're Young" as the first single from the album on January 10, 2011. The single reached number 81 on the US Billboard Hot 100. A second single from the album, "Every Time You Go" was released to digital outlets on May 23, 2011. The band embarked on a tour in July 2011, across the US, Europe, and the United Kingdom in support of the album. The album debuted and peaked at number 3 on the Billboard 200, with 59,800 copies sold in its first week. Beginning in May 2012, the band embarked on a six-week-long "Gang of Outlaws Tour" with headliners ZZ Top and opener Gretchen Wilson.

On May 23, 2012, Matt Roberts announced he was leaving the band to focus on his health. He told fans in a statement, "3 Doors Down will always have a special place in my heart and it saddens me to take this time off. But my health has to be my first priority". Rhythm guitarist Chris Henderson announced on Twitter that his former guitar tech Chet Roberts would replace Matt Roberts as lead guitarist.

After the "Gang of Outlaws" tour finished, the band said in an interview that they were entering the studio to record three or four new songs for their first Greatest Hits album, which was released on November 19, 2012. During the tail end of the Gang of Outlaws tour, they debuted a new song "One Light" which was included on the band's The Greatest Hits. Rhythm guitarist Chris Henderson announced on Twitter they would be back in the studio a few weeks after the tour had ended. In late 2012, the band appeared at several smaller shows including one in Huntington, New York. The band performed at Download Festival 2013 at the Zippo Encore Stage on the Friday of the three-day festival. From the end of 2012 through March 2013, 3 Doors Down went on a joint headlining tour with US rock band Daughtry to promote Daughtry's third studio album release. The cover of "In the Air Tonight" was captured and uploaded to Daughtry's official YouTube channel. The band also played the Dubai Jazz Festival in February 2013.

On April 20, 2013, bassist Todd Harrell was charged with vehicular homicide for his actions the night before in Nashville, Tennessee. He was reportedly driving on I-40 at high speed while under the influence of prescription medication when he caused an accident that killed 47-year-old Paul Howard Shoulders Jr. The judge in the case harshly criticized the musician's doctor in the courtroom, accusing the physician of prescribing Harrell far too many pain pills. Harrell was also charged with bringing controlled substances into a correctional detention facility. In December 2015, Harrell was sentenced to two years' imprisonment followed by six years of probation.

3 Doors Down later announced that the four scheduled shows in the U.S. for April and May had been cancelled out of respect for Shoulders and his family. The European tour with Prime Circle and the summer tour dates with Daughtry, which had been announced the day after the incident in Nashville, remained intact. On May 24, a week before the start on the European tour, Justin Biltonen, formerly of the Campaign 1984, was announced as the band's new bassist. The tour, starting in Moscow, Russia began on May 31, 2013. On July 20, 2013, they played live at the 2013 National Scout Jamboree at the Summit Bechtel Reserve.

=== Us and the Night and death of Matt Roberts: 2014–2024 ===
From the end of 2013 into 2014, the band embarked on an acoustic tour entitled "Songs from the Basement" and toured around the US. In February 2014, Todd Harrell was arrested in Mississippi once again for a Driving under the influence (DUI). Afterward, the band released a statement that Harrell had permanently left the band, and that they would continue with Justin Biltonen as his replacement. In June, Henderson announced that the band's next album would be entitled Us and the Night. In January 2016, the album's release date was revealed to be March 11, 2016. The band then went on tour around North America and in festivals such as Fort Rock and Carolina Rebellion. 3 Doors Down toured the UK and Europe with multiple sold-out shows. Us and the Night peaked at number 14 on the charts.

Former lead guitarist Matt Roberts died on August 20, 2016, at the age of 38 from a prescription drug overdose.

3 Doors Down performed their song "The Broken" at the presidential inauguration concert of US President-elect Donald Trump on January 20, 2017. Arnold told TMZ that he was "proud" to perform and that he thought it would be a "good experience". Fans of the band expressed positive feedback about it performing at the inauguration. 3 Doors Down's business manager, Angus Vail, explained to Vice the reasons behind the band's decision to perform by saying: "Well, 3 Doors actually played George W. Bush's inauguration. They are good Mississippi and Alabama boys — they come from conservative families. You know, they're really good guys, but they have very different political beliefs. Because they played both Bush's inaugurations, they've obviously been on the conservative radar." Vail continued that the band's choice to perform had a lot to do with their "God, guns, and country black-and-white sort of viewpoint" and that "they spend a lot of time going to Iraq, doing service, playing for the troops." In the week following the performance, the band's The Greatest Hits compilation album reentered the Billboard 200 at a new peak of number 94; the album had debuted and peaked at number 100 in 2012 and had been off the chart since April 2016. In February 2018, during an interview with Detroit Metro Times, rhythm guitarist Chris Henderson stated about the performance, "it wasn't a Trump thing. That's what people don't understand. It was the inauguration of a president of the United States of America." He also called it "history-making" and "It's a one-in-a-lifetime chance to do something for your country. So that's why we did it."

In 2018, 3 Doors Down embarked on the Rock n' Roll Express tour with Collective Soul and opening act Soul Asylum. The tour had shows in 36 cities in the US.

In July 2018, Arnold stated that 3 Doors Down had been writing new material; "Who knows when we'll follow that one up. But we have been writing new songs. Maybe we'll release a single or a couple of new songs. We just might not release an album for a while. We still love creating new material — there's just not a market for it. But fans still like going out and seeing us." In August 2019, Arnold stated that the band would soon begin working on a follow-up to Us and the Night.

In 2023, the band embarked on The Better Life 20th Anniversary Tour, commemorating the 2000 release of their debut album. The tour featured a full live performance of the album and included Candlebox as the supporting act.

On August 11, 2023, 3 Doors Down released a 20th-anniversary deluxe edition of their 2002 album Away from the Sun. The expanded release features remastered audio from the original 24-bit source tapes together with ten bonus tracks, including previously unreleased songs, demos and rare B-sides. A new music video for the track "Pop Song" accompanied the release, and the band performed the entire album on an accompanying anniversary tour.

On October 30, 2023, 3 Doors Down was announced by the band Creed as a supporting band for their then-upcoming Summer of 99 tour along with Daughtry, Switchfoot, Tonic, Big Wreck, and Finger Eleven for select dates. The Summer of 99 tour began in Green Bay, Wisconsin, on July 17, 2024, and continued through December 5, 2024.

=== Arnold's cancer diagnosis and death: 2025–2026 ===
On May 7, 2025, Brad Arnold announced that he had been diagnosed with Stage IV clear-cell renal-cell carcinoma, a form of kidney cancer that had metastasized to his lungs. The band announced it via a video message on its official social media platforms. As a result, the band cancelled all scheduled performances. Arnold stated, "It's not my time", referencing the title of the band's 2008 single, and asked fans for prayers and support.

On February 7, 2026, Arnold died from the cancer in his sleep; his death was announced by the band later in the afternoon through a statement on their social media accounts. Arnold was paid tribute from the rock music community in his honor.

== Other appearances ==
On February 9, 2010, the band released a song called "Shine", through digital media such as iTunes, which was used as a promotion for the 2010 Winter Olympics and is available through digital outlets. Billboard listed 3 Doors Down as the No. 30 band in the decade from 2000 to 2010.

On January 30, 2011, 3 Doors Down played during the first period intermission of the 2011 NHL All-Star Game in Raleigh, North Carolina. They played two songs: "When You're Young" followed by "Kryptonite". The band also held a free concert as part of the weekend festivities on January 28, 2011, in downtown Raleigh.

On June 28–29, 2014, 3 Doors Down played both days of the Americafest celebration at Kadena Air Base, Okinawa, Japan. They played all of their greatest hits and two new songs.

== The Better Life Foundation ==
The Better Life Foundation logo

3 Doors Down started The Better Life Foundation (TBLF) in 2003, with a goal in mind to give as many children as possible a better life. Since its inception TBLF has supported numerous charities across the US, including the Center for the Prevention of Child Abuse, and the Habitat for Humanity, as well as providing aid and assistance to the Gulf Coast region of Mississippi during Hurricane Katrina. In 2006, Brad Arnold stated that approximately $900,000 had been raised.

When the Mississippi town of Waveland took an especially hard hit from Hurricane Katrina, the charity was able to purchase three police cars and a fire truck to help with rescue efforts. Also, in connection with Wal-Mart, they were able to supply the town with three semi-trucks full of rescue supplies. There was also extensive support from TBLF in providing funding for rebuilding efforts in the town.

3 Doors Down and the Better Life Foundation host a yearly show to raise money for the charity. Beginning in 2010, the show is performed at Horseshoe Hotel and Casino, in Tunica, Mississippi. Prior to 2010, the show was performed at the Hard Rock Hotel and Casino in Biloxi, Mississippi. In addition to a concert from 3 Doors Down and friends, there is also an auction, which includes numerous items from musical friends, sports icons, and other various supporters of the band and the charity. There is an average of 60 items auctioned off yearly, and proceeds are given to TBLF. As of 2016, the Better Life Foundation annual benefit concert has been held at Harrah's Cherokee Casino Resort in Cherokee, North Carolina.

Past performers at the show include Lynyrd Skynyrd, Shinedown, Alter Bridge, Staind, Hinder, Switchfoot, Tracy Lawrence, Sara Evans, and others. Past auction items include a Paul Stanley guitar played on the Kiss Farewell Tour, a total of four Roger Bourget motorcycles, access to the Dale Earnhardt Jr. racing suite, NASCAR artwork by Brad Daley, numerous signed guitars, and sports memorabilia.

== Band members ==
Current members

- Chris Henderson – rhythm guitar, backing vocals (1998–present)
- Greg Upchurch – drums (2005–present)
- Chet Roberts – lead guitar, backing vocals (2012–present)
- Justin Biltonen – bass (2013–present), lead vocals (2026–present)

Former members

- Brad Arnold – lead vocals (1996–2026; his death), drums (1996–2000)
- Matt Roberts – lead guitar, backing vocals (1996–2012; died 2016), rhythm guitar (1996–98)
- Todd Harrell – bass (1996–2013)
- Richard Liles – drums (2000–02)
- Daniel Adair – drums, backing vocals (2002–05)

== Discography ==
Studio albums

- The Better Life (2000)
- Away from the Sun (2002)
- Seventeen Days (2005)
- 3 Doors Down (2008)
- Time of My Life (2011)
- Us and the Night (2016)

== Accolades ==
Award	Year	Nominee(s)	Category	Result	Ref.
American Music Awards	2001	Themselves	Favorite Pop/Rock New Artist	Won	
American Music Awards	2003	Themselves	Favorite Pop/Rock Band/Duo/Group	Nominated	
American Music Awards	2005	Themselves	Favorite Pop/Rock Band/Duo/Group	Nominated	
BMI Pop Awards	2001	"Kryptonite"	Award-Winning Songs	Won	
BMI Pop Awards	2002	"Kryptonite"	Award-Winning Songs	Won	
BMI Pop Awards	2002	"Be Like That"	Award-Winning Songs	Won	
BMI Pop Awards	2002	"Duck and Run"	Award-Winning Songs	Won	
BMI Pop Awards	2002	"Loser"	Award-Winning Songs	Won	
Billboard Music Awards	2000	Themselves	Top New Artist	Nominated	
Billboard Music Awards	2000	Themselves	Top Mainstream Rock Artist	Nominated	
Billboard Music Awards	2000	Themselves	Top Modern Rock Artist	Nominated	
Billboard Music Awards	2000	"Kryptonite"	Top Mainstream Rock Track	Won	
Billboard Music Awards	2000	"Kryptonite"	Top Modern Rock Track	Nominated	
Billboard Music Awards	2001	Themselves	Top Mainstream Rock Artist	Nominated	
Billboard Music Awards	2001	"Loser"	Top Mainstream Rock Track	Nominated	
Billboard Music Awards	2003	Themselves	Top Duo/Group	Won	
Billboard Music Awards	2003	Themselves	Top Hot 100 Artist – Duo/Group	Won	
Billboard Music Awards	2003	Themselves	Top Hot Mainstream Top 40 Artist	Nominated	
Billboard Music Awards	2003	"When I'm Gone"	Top Hot 100 Song	Nominated	
Billboard Music Awards	2003	"When I'm Gone"	Top Hot 100 Airplay Track	Nominated	
Billboard Music Awards	2003	"When I'm Gone"	Top Hot Adult Top 40 Tracks	Nominated	
Billboard Music Awards	2004	Themselves	Top Hot Adult Top 40 Artist	Nominated	
Billboard Music Awards	2004	"Here Without You"	Top Hot Adult Top 40 Track	Nominated	
Billboard Music Awards	2005	"Let Me Go"	Top Hot Adult Top 40 Track	Nominated	
Billboard Year-End	2007	"It's Not My Time"	Top Adult Top 40 Song	Nominated	
Blockbuster Entertainment Awards	2001	The Better Life	Favorite Group – New Artist	Won	
My VH1 Music Awards	2000	Themselves	Welcome to the Big Time!	Nominated	
Teen Choice Awards	2001	"Duck and Run"	Choice Rock Track	Nominated	
Teen Choice Awards	2001	Themselves	Choice Rock Group	Nominated	
Teen Choice Awards	2003	Themselves	Choice Rock Group	Nominated	
Teen Choice Awards	2004	Themselves	Choice Rock Group	Nominated	
Teen Choice Awards	2004	"Here Without You"	Choice Rock Track	Nominated	
Teen Choice Awards	2004	Tour (with Nickelback)	Choice Music Tour	Nominated	
Teen Choice Awards	2005	Themselves	Choice Rock Group	Nominated	
Teen Choice Awards	2005	"Let Me Go"	Choice Rock Track	Nominated	
