= Us and the Night =

2016 studio album by 3 Doors Down

Studio album by 3 Doors Down
- Released: March 11, 2016
- Recorded: May–July 2015
- Studios: Rivergate (Nashville, Tennessee); Blackbird (Nashville, Tennessee)
- Length: 37:48 (standard edition); 44:48 (deluxe edition)
- Label: Republic
- Producer: Matt Wallace

3 Doors Down chronology
Time of My Life (2011)	Us and the Night (2016)

Singles from Us and the Night
- 1. "In the Dark" Released: January 15, 2016; 2. "Still Alive" Released: May 30, 2016; 3. "The Broken" Released: November 2016

Us and the Night is the sixth studio album by the American rock band 3 Doors Down, released on March 11, 2016. It is 3 Doors Down's first studio album since Time of My Life (2011), marking the longest gap between two studio albums up to that point in their career. It is the band's first album with Chet Roberts on lead guitar and Justin Biltonen on bass. The album received mixed reviews from critics. Us and the Night debuted at number 14 on the Billboard 200 chart and spawned three singles: "In the Dark", "Still Alive", and "The Broken". To promote the record, the band headlined tours across Europe and North America.

It was the last album released by the band before the death of lead singer Brad Arnold in 2026.

== Background ==
On June 17, 2015, Chris Henderson announced that the new album would be titled Us and the Night. The release date was announced on January 7, 2016.

== Promotion ==
On May 3, 2016, 3 Doors Down announced a 13-city European tour to support the album, starting on October 19 at Berlin's Columbiahalle and finishing on November 6 at London's Hammersmith Apollo. Pop Evil were a supporting act on all dates and Fallen State performed on the U.K. dates. On May 16, the band announced a 24-city summer-fall U.S. tour, beginning on August 26 at Charleston's Municipal Auditorium and finishing on November 12 at Harrah's Cherokee Casino Resort, with Pop Evil and Red Sun Rising as supporting acts. On January 20, 2017, the band announced a Canadian leg of their tour, starting on March 9 at Moncton's Casino New Brunswick and ending on March 19 at Enoch's River Cree Resort & Casino.

== Reception ==
=== Critical reception ===
Professional ratings
Aggregate scores
Source	Rating
Metacritic	51/100
Review scores
Source	Rating
AllMusic	3/5 stars
Consequence of Sound	C−
Renowned for Sound	2.5/5 stars

Us and the Night garnered mixed reviews from music critics. At Metacritic, which assigns a normalized rating out of 100 to reviews from mainstream critics, the album received an average score of 51, based on 4 reviews.

AllMusic's Stephen Thomas Erlewine noted how the album was "a brighter affair than Time of My Life", giving credit to the band for favoring "wide strokes over specificity" with their lyrical content and instrumentation, concluding that "[T]his contradiction means the band remains an uneasy good time, but at least on Us and the Night the reconstituted 3 Doors Down have decided to look on the sunny side of life." Jessica Thomas from Renowned for Sound commented about the overall feel throughout the record's track listing: "While there’s nothing necessarily bad or unpleasant about its content or delivery, there just isn’t anything new or exciting either. Each track falls into the rut of being entirely too similar, and from the thematic material to production, there’s just too much familiarity to discern from one track to the next." Consequence of Sound writer Adam Kivel also gave a critique on the band's lyricism throughout the album: "Arnold’s lyrics latch onto tired tropes and clichéd rhymes, rather than offering any sort of narrative or emotional specificity. None of the songs are terrible, but none of them make much of an impression."

=== Commercial performance ===
The album debuted at number 14 on the Billboard 200, number two on Top Rock Albums chart, and number one on the Independent Albums chart, with 24,000 copies sold on its first week of release.

== Track listing ==
All tracks are written by Brad Arnold, Chris Henderson, Greg Upchurch, Chet Roberts, and Justin Biltonen.

No.	Title	Length
1.	"The Broken"	2:46
2.	"In the Dark"	3:43
3.	"Still Alive"	2:41
4.	"Believe It"	3:21
5.	"Living in Your Hell"	3:48
6.	"Inside of Me"	3:45
7.	"I Don't Wanna Know"	3:24
8.	"Pieces of Me"	3:38
9.	"Love Is a Lie"	2:47
10.	"Us and the Night"	3:59
11.	"Fell from the Moon"	3:56
Total length:		37:48

Deluxe edition bonus tracks
No.	Title	Length
12.	"Found Me There"	3:22
13.	"Walk Before You Run"	3:38

== Personnel ==
Credits adapted from the album's booklet.

3 Doors Down

- Brad Arnold – vocals
- Chet Roberts – lead guitar, backing vocals, additional editing and programming
- Chris Henderson – guitar, backing vocals
- Justin Biltonen – bass guitar
- Greg Upchurch – drums

Technical

- Matt Wallace – producer, engineer
- Chris Lord-Alge – mixing engineer
- Nik Karpen – assistant mix engineer
- Ernesto Olvera – assistant engineer
- Marshall Bastin – assistant engineer
- Ted Jensen – mastering
- Aron Friedman – additional keyboard and programming

== Chart performance ==
=== Weekly charts ===
Chart (2016)	Peak position
Australian Albums (ARIA)	34
Austrian Albums (Ö3 Austria)	14
Belgian Albums (Ultratop Flanders)	59
Canadian Albums (Billboard)	15
Dutch Albums (Album Top 100)	45
German Albums (Offizielle Top 100)	5
Swiss Albums (Schweizer Hitparade)	4
UK Albums (Official Charts)	60
US Billboard 200	14
US Top Rock Albums (Billboard)	2

=== Year-end charts ===
Chart (2016)	Position
US Top Rock Albums (Billboard)	72

=== Singles ===
List of singles, with selected chart positions, showing year released
Title	Year	Peak chart positions
Title	Year	US Main. Rock
"In the Dark"	2016	2
"Still Alive"	2016	6
"The Broken"	2016	36
