= Here Without You =

2003 single by 3 Doors Down

Single by 3 Doors Down

from the album Away from the Sun
- B-side: "It's Not Me" (live)
- Released: July 28, 2003
- Studio: London Bridge (Seattle, Washington); Greenhouse (Burnaby, British Columbia); Ocean Way (Hollywood, California)
- Genre: Post-grunge
- Length: 3:58
- Label: Republic; Universal
- Songwriters: Brad Arnold; Todd Harrell; Chris Henderson; Matt Roberts
- Producer: Rick Parashar

3 Doors Down singles chronology
| "The Road I'm On" (2003) | "Here Without You" (2003) | "Away from the Sun" (2004) |

Music video
- "Here Without You" on YouTube

"Here Without You" is a song by American rock band 3 Doors Down. The power ballad was released on July 28, 2003, as the third single from the band's second studio album, Away from the Sun (2002). The song reached No. 5 on the US Billboard Hot 100 in November 2003 and was certified sextuple platinum in the US for selling over 6 million units. It was also successful around the world, peaking at No. 2 in Australia and reaching the top 10 in Denmark, the Netherlands, and New Zealand.

== Background and meaning ==
Brad Arnold stated that the main inspiration for the song was his ex-wife.

In an interview with Arnold, Kevin Johnson of St. Louis Post-Dispatch said the song "became an Iraq War anthem." Arnold added, "[t]hat's one of those songs...a lot of people can identify with whether they’re apart for...hours or...months while (someone) is away overseas."

He elaborated the story behind the song during an interview by Shawna Ortega of Songfacts: "The song's about being away from someone, or missing them. And it really doesn't matter if you're here without them for all day or all month. It's about the loneliness and missing of somebody. But in a way, people take that as a little bit of a sad song, and I kind of meant it as a happy song, because it's talking about being here without you, but she's still with me in my dreams. And tonight, it's only you and me, so the song was really about that dream. And being in a state of peace, because you've got that person there with you in your sleep. In that way I kind of meant for it to be a little bit of a happy song."

Chicago Tribune said the song "struck a vital chord among members of the American military, many of whom were serving overseas during the Iraq War."

== Chart performance ==
"Here Without You" peaked at No. 5 on the Billboard Hot 100 for the week ending November 8, 2003, becoming the band's third and final top-10 hit as of 2026. Only their songs "Kryptonite" and "When I'm Gone" reached higher positions on the chart, peaking at No. 3 and No. 4, respectively. It has since been certified double platinum in the United States and platinum in Australia. The song was a large success on pop radio, becoming their third No. 1 hit on the Mainstream Top 40 chart and their first No. 1 on the Adult Top 40 chart, where it stayed at the top for 13 weeks.

While one of their most popular songs, "Here Without You" was not a large hit on the band's home format of rock radio, peaking at No. 14 on the Mainstream Rock Tracks chart and No. 22 on the Modern Rock Tracks chart. After the song's release, "Here Without You" remained a staple on pop and adult contemporary radio but not on rock or alternative radio. Worldwide, the song reached No. 1 in Canada, No. 2 in Australia, becoming the band's highest-charting single there. It also reached the top 10 in Denmark, the Netherlands, and New Zealand as well as the top 20 in Austria, Norway, and Sweden.

== Live performances ==
"Here Without You" was first performed live on December 31, 2002, at First Union Spectrum in Philadelphia. As of February 10, 2026, it has been performed 645 times, making it the fifth-most-performed song by 3 Doors Down.

== Track listings ==
UK CD single

1. "Here Without You" (album version) – 3:57
2. "Here Without You" (live) – 4:11
3. "It's Not Me" (live) – 3:47
4. "Here Without You" (video)

European CD single

1. "Here Without You" – 3:57
2. "Here Without You" (live) – 4:11

Australian maxi-CD single

1. "Here Without You" (album version) – 3:57
2. "Here Without You" (acoustic version) – 3:52
3. "Kryptonite" (live) – 4:14
4. "Here Without You" (enhanced video—album version) – 3:47

== Charts ==
=== Weekly charts ===
2003–2004 weekly chart performance for "Here Without You"
| Chart (2003–2004) | Peak position |
|---|---|
| Australia (ARIA) | 2 |
| Austria (Ö3 Austria Top 40) | 13 |
| Belgium (Ultratop 50 Flanders) | 26 |
| Canada CHR (Nielsen BDS) | 1 |
| CIS Airplay (TopHit) | 39 |
| Denmark (Tracklisten) | 8 |
| Germany (GfK) | 23 |
| Netherlands (Dutch Top 40) | 6 |
| Netherlands (Single Top 100) | 12 |
| New Zealand (Recorded Music NZ) | 10 |
| Norway (VG-lista) | 11 |
| Poland (Polish Airplay Charts) | 2 |
| Romania (Romanian Top 100) | 80 |
| Russia Airplay (TopHit) | 21 |
| Scotland Singles (OCC) | 78 |
| Sweden (Sverigetopplistan) | 14 |
| Switzerland (Schweizer Hitparade) | 61 |
| UK Singles (OCC) | 77 |
| UK Rock & Metal (OCC) | 7 |
| Ukraine Airplay (TopHit) | 97 |
| US Billboard Hot 100 | 5 |
| US Adult Contemporary (Billboard) | 14 |
| US Adult Pop Airplay (Billboard) | 1 |
| US Alternative Airplay (Billboard) | 22 |
| US Mainstream Rock (Billboard) | 14 |
| US Pop Airplay (Billboard) | 1 |

2022 weekly chart performance for "Here Without You"
| Chart (2022) | Peak position |
|---|---|
| Canada Digital Song Sales (Billboard) | 11 |
| US Digital Song Sales (Billboard) | 14 |

2026 weekly chart performance for "Here Without You"
| Chart (2026) | Peak position |
|---|---|
| Global 200 (Billboard) | 135 |
| Portugal (AFP) | 67 |
| UK Singles Sales (OCC) | 60 |
| UK Rock & Metal (OCC) | 27 |
| US Digital Song Sales (Billboard) | 8 |
| US Hot Rock & Alternative Songs (Billboard) | 10 |

=== Year-end charts ===
2003 year-end chart performance for "Here Without You"
| Chart (2003) | Position |
|---|---|
| US Billboard Hot 100 | 62 |
| US Adult Top 40 (Billboard) | 29 |
| US Mainstream Top 40 (Billboard) | 25 |
| US Modern Rock Tracks (Billboard) | 81 |

2004 year-end chart performance for "Here Without You"
| Chart (2004) | Position |
|---|---|
| Australia (ARIA) | 18 |
| Belgium (Ultratop 50 Flanders) | 96 |
| Netherlands (Dutch Top 40) | 14 |
| Netherlands (Single Top 100) | 52 |
| Russia Airplay (TopHit) | 198 |
| Sweden (Hitlistan) | 38 |
| US Billboard Hot 100 | 15 |
| US Adult Contemporary (Billboard) | 17 |
| US Adult Top 40 (Billboard) | 4 |
| US Mainstream Top 40 (Billboard) | 20 |

=== Decade-end charts ===
Decade-end chart performance for "Here Without You"
| Chart (2000–2009) | Position |
|---|---|
| US Billboard Hot 100 | 68 |

== Certifications ==
Certifications for "Here Without You"
| Region | Certification | Certified units/sales |
|---|---|---|
| Australia (ARIA) | Platinum | 70,000^{^} |
| Brazil (Pro-Música Brasil) | Gold | 30,000^{‡} |
| Brazil (Pro-Música Brasil) acoustic version | Platinum | 60,000^{‡} |
| Denmark (IFPI Danmark) | Platinum | 90,000^{‡} |
| Germany (BVMI) | Gold | 150,000^{‡} |
| Italy (FIMI) | Gold | 50,000^{‡} |
| New Zealand (RMNZ) | 4× Platinum | 120,000^{‡} |
| Portugal (AFP) | 2× Platinum | 50,000^{‡} |
| United Kingdom (BPI) | Gold | 400,000^{‡} |
| United States (RIAA) | 6× Platinum | 6,000,000^{‡} |
| United States (RIAA) for video single | 6× Platinum | 300,000^{^} |
^{^} Shipments figures based on certification alone.^{‡} Sales+streaming figures based on certification alone.

== Release history ==
Release dates and formats for "Here Without You"
| Region | Date | Format(s) | Label(s) | Ref. |
|---|---|---|---|---|
| United States | July 28, 2003 | Contemporary hit; hot AC; mainstream rock; active rock; alternative radio | Republic; Universal | |
| Australia | January 19, 2004 | CD | Republic; Universal | |
| United Kingdom | May 31, 2004 | CD | Republic; Universal | |
