= Be Like That (3 Doors Down song) =

2001 single by 3 Doors Down

Single by 3 Doors Down

from the album The Better Life
- Released: May 29, 2001
- Length: 4:25 (album version); 3:57 (radio edit)
- Label: Republic
- Composers: Matt Roberts; Brad Arnold; Todd Harrell
- Lyricist: Brad Arnold
- Producer: Paul Ebersold

3 Doors Down singles chronology
"Duck and Run" (2001)	"Be Like That" (2001)	"When I'm Gone" (2002)

Music videos
- "Be Like That" (official video) on YouTube
- "Be Like That" (alternate video) on YouTube

"Be Like That" is a song by the American rock band 3 Doors Down. It was released on May 29, 2001, as the fourth single from their debut album, The Better Life (2000). The ballad peaked at number 24 on the US Billboard Hot 100 for the week ending November 10, 2001. A version of the song with minor lyrical changes was made for the film American Pie 2 and was included on the film's soundtrack.

== Content ==
3 Doors Down lead singer Brad Arnold said, "This song was strange, because I wrote the verses and the choruses at two completely different times. And I couldn't think of the verse for the chorus, or the chorus for the verse. I always sing in my vehicle on my way home from band practice, and one night I was sitting there singing, and I put those two together, and I was like, Duh. And like I said, I don't play guitar at all. But I can just like sit down and chicken peck a note out or something. I went home and got a three chord structure going for the melody of it, and took it to practice the next day. I asked Chris [Henderson] to make something out of it, and he came back the next day and he had it, and it just went from there. But that song is just really about following your dreams. And I know everybody has 'em. It's not just about following your dreams, though. It's a little bit about dreams that you've missed, and a little notion of regret, also."

The person in the first verse of the song is fictional, and Arnold left it open to interpretation on whether that person is older or younger. He said: "The difference in a good song and a great song, to me, is the difference in a good book and a good movie: They're both telling you the same story. They both have the same outcome. But whereas the movie is telling you exactly what to see and be heard, the book kind of lets you see whatever your mind comes up with, and it makes it a lot more applicable to your life in a lot of ways."

The songs second verse makes a reference to Northpark Mall in Ridgeland, Mississippi (adjacent to their hometown), a place the band frequented during their youth.

== Music video ==
A music video directed by Liz Friedlander and Nigel Dick and was filmed at Black Park in Wexham, Buckinghamshire, England. An alternate version of the video was also made by Friedlander featuring clips from American Pie 2 throughout the video.

== Live performances ==
"Be Like That" was first performed live on April 10, 2000, at WAAF studios in Westborough, Massachusetts. As of February 10, 2026, it has been performed 434 times, making it the ninth most performed song by 3 Doors Down.

== Track listings ==
Australian CD1

1. "Be Like That" (radio edit of original version) – 3:57
2. "Be Like That" (album version) – 4:25
3. "Be Like That" (acoustic version) – 4:26
4. "Duck and Run" (video)
5. "Be Like That" (video)

Australian CD2

1. "Be Like That" (radio edit of original version) – 3:57
2. "Loser" (album version) – 4:22
3. "Be Like That" (acoustic version) – 4:25
4. "Be Like That" (video)

UK CD single

1. "Be Like That" (radio edit) – 3:57
2. "Be Like That" (acoustic version) – 4:26

German maxi-CD single

1. "Be Like That" (radio edit) – 3:57
2. "Be Like That" (acoustic version) – 4:26
3. "Be Like That" (American Pie edit) – 3:57
4. "Not Enough" (live) – 3:08

== Personnel ==
Credits are adapted from the US promo CD liner notes.

- Brad Arnold – lyrics, music
- Matt Roberts – music
- Todd Harrell – music
- Paul Ebersold – production
- Toby Wright – mixing

== Charts ==
=== Weekly charts ===
Weekly chart performance for "Be Like That"
Chart (2001)	Peak position
UK Singles (OCC)	144
UK Rock & Metal (Official Charts)	12
US Billboard Hot 100	24
US Adult Pop Airplay (Billboard)	5
US Alternative Airplay (Billboard)	22
US Pop Airplay (Billboard)	14
US Mainstream Rock Airplay (Billboard)	10

=== Year-end charts ===
2001 year-end chart performance for "Be Like That"
Chart (2001)	Position
Canada Radio (Nielsen BDS)	64
US Billboard Hot 100	96
US Adult Top 40 (Billboard)	25
US Mainstream Rock Tracks (Billboard)	30
US Mainstream Top 40 (Billboard)	40
US Modern Rock Tracks (Billboard)	87

2002 year-end chart performance for "Be Like That"
Chart (2002)	Position
US Adult Top 40 (Billboard)	22

== Certifications ==
Certifications for "Be Like That"
Region	Certification	Certified units/sales
United States (RIAA)	Platinum	1,000,000^{‡}
^{‡} Sales+streaming figures based on certification alone.

== Release history ==
Release dates and formats for "Be Like That"
Region	Date	Format(s)	Label(s)	Ref.
United States	May 29, 2001	Contemporary hit; hot AC; mainstream rock; active rock; alternative; triple A radio	Republic	
Australia	August 20, 2001	CD1	Republic	
Australia	November 5, 2001	CD2	Republic	
United Kingdom	November 5, 2001	CD	Republic	
