= Loser (3 Doors Down song) =

2000 single by 3 Doors Down

Single by 3 Doors Down

from the album The Better Life
- Released: June 26, 2000
- Studio: Ardent (Memphis, Tennessee)
- Genre: Post-grunge; alternative rock
- Length: 4:21 (album version); 3:48 (radio edit)
- Label: Republic; Universal
- Composers: Matt Roberts; Brad Arnold; Todd Harrell
- Lyricist: Brad Arnold
- Producer: Paul Ebersold

3 Doors Down singles chronology
"Kryptonite" (2000)	"Loser" (2000)	"Duck and Run" (2001)

Music video
- "Loser" on YouTube

"Loser" is a song by the American rock band 3 Doors Down. It was released on June 26, 2000, as the second single from their debut album, The Better Life (2000). The song spent 21 weeks at number one on the US Billboard Mainstream Rock Tracks chart, an all-time record for the listing. It additionally peaked at number four on the Canadian RPM Rock Report and rose to number five in Portugal in April 2003.

== Content ==
According to lead lyricist Brad Arnold, the song is written from the perspective of a childhood friend of his who became addicted to cocaine. The lyrics describe symptoms of depression and withdrawal, and allude to suicide.

== Release and reception ==
=== Commercial performance ===
Released to American mainstream rock and active rock radio on June 26, 2000, "Loser" debuted on the US Billboard Hot 100 at number 76 on the chart dated October 21, 2000. It spent 20 weeks on this chart, peaking at number 55 on December 2 of the same year. On the Billboard Mainstream Rock Tracks chart, the song spent 21 weeks at number one (from September 9, 2000, to January 27, 2001), becoming the chart's longest-running number one hit, and it is among the songs that spent the most weeks on the listing, remaining on the chart for 53 weeks. In addition, it reached number two on the Billboard Modern Rock Tracks chart and number 36 on the Adult Top 40. The Recording Industry Association of America (RIAA) awarded the song a platinum certification on December 9, 2024, for sales and streams of over 1,000,000. In Canada, it peaked at number four on the RPM Top 30 Rock Report in September 2000.

Beginning in early 2001, "Loser" began to chart in other countries outside North America. In Germany, it debuted at number 99 on January 8, rose to its peak of number 78 the following week, then spent three more weeks on the Media Control chart before falling off. It spent three weeks on the Dutch Single Top 100 in February, peaking at number 67 during its second week in. In neighboring Belgium, the track appeared on Flanders' Ultratip Bubbling Under listing, peaking at number nine on March 10. Later the same month, it debuted at number 42 on the New Zealand Singles Chart and rose to number 37, its peak, on April 1. On the Australian Singles Chart, the song topped off at number 68 on May 7. "Loser" experienced withstanding popularity in Portugal, not reaching the top 10 until April 2003, when it climbed to number five on the AFP ranking.

=== Brad Arnold's response ===
When 3 Doors Down lead singer Brad Arnold discovered that "Loser" had topped the Billboard Mainstream Rock Tracks chart for 21 weeks, he was initially indifferent, explaining that they were still focusing on the success of their previous single, "Kryptonite". He said that although "Loser" was virtually ignored, it was the band's deal-maker along with "Duck and Run" and "Be Like That"; however, Arnold has stated that if "Loser" did not become a hit, neither would have the succeeding two singles.

== Music video ==
The music video, directed by Liz Friedlander, features the band performing the song in a dimly lit high school. According to Arnold, the video shoot took place in California. It was shot from August 7 to 9.

== Live performances ==
"Loser" was first performed live on January 15, 1997, in Pascagoula, Mississippi. As of February 10, 2026, it has been performed 680 times, making it the second most performed song by 3 Doors Down.

== Track listings ==
European CD single

1. "Loser" (Top40 radio edit) – 3:50
2. "Loser" (live version) – 5:38

European maxi-CD single and Australian CD1

1. "Loser" (album version) – 4:21
2. "Loser" (acoustic, Radio Fritz, Berlin) – 3:59
3. "Loser" (live version) – 5:38
4. "Kryptonite" (acoustic version) – 3:49

Australian CD2

1. "Loser" (album version)
2. "Kryptonite" (acoustic version)
3. "Wasted Me"
4. "By My Side" (live)
5. "So I Need You" (live)
6. "Kryptonite" (video)
7. "Loser" (video)

== Credits and personnel ==
Credits are lifted from the US promo CD and European CD single liner notes.

Studio

- Recorded at Ardent Studios (Memphis, Tennessee)

Personnel

- Brad Arnold – music, lyrics
- Matt Roberts – music
- Todd Harrell – music
- Paul Ebersold – production, recording
- Matt Martone – recording
- Toby Wright – mixing

== Charts ==
=== Weekly charts ===
Weekly chart performance for "Loser"
Chart (2000–2003)	Peak position
Australia (ARIA)	68
Belgium (Ultratip Bubbling Under Flanders)	9
Canada Rock/Alternative (RPM)	4
Germany (GfK)	78
Netherlands (Dutch Top 40 Tipparade)	6
Netherlands (Single Top 100)	67
New Zealand (Recorded Music NZ)	37
Portugal (AFP)	5
US Billboard Hot 100	55
US Adult Pop Airplay (Billboard)	36
US Alternative Airplay (Billboard)	2
US Mainstream Rock Airplay (Billboard)	1

=== Year-end charts ===
2000 year-end chart performance for "Loser"
Chart (2000)	Position
US Mainstream Rock Tracks (Billboard)	8
US Modern Rock Tracks (Billboard)	27

2001 year-end chart performance for "Loser"
Chart (2001)	Position
US Mainstream Rock Tracks (Billboard)	5
US Modern Rock Tracks (Billboard)	33

=== Decade-end charts ===
Decade-end chart performance for "Loser"
Chart (2000–2009)	Position
US Hot Rock Songs (Billboard)	9

== Certifications ==
Certifications for "Loser"
Region	Certification	Certified units/sales
New Zealand (RMNZ)	Gold	15,000^{‡}
United States (RIAA)	Platinum	1,000,000^{‡}
^{‡} Sales+streaming figures based on certification alone.

== Release history ==
Release history and formats for "Loser"
Region	Date	Format(s)	Label(s)	Ref.
United States	June 26, 2000	Mainstream rock; active rock radio	Republic; Universal	
United States	July 18, 2000	Alternative radio	Republic; Universal	
United States	January 22, 2001	Hot adult contemporary radio	Republic; Universal	
United States	January 23, 2001	Contemporary hit radio	Republic; Universal	
Australia	April 23, 2001	CD1	Republic; Universal	
Australia	June 4, 2001	CD2	Republic; Universal	
