= Duck and Run =

2001 single by 3 Doors Down

Single by 3 Doors Down

from the album The Better Life
- Released: January 9, 2001
- Genre: Alternative metal; post-grunge
- Length: 3:52
- Label: Republic; Universal
- Composers: Matt Roberts; Brad Arnold; Todd Harrell
- Lyricist: Brad Arnold
- Producer: Paul Ebersold

3 Doors Down singles chronology
"Loser" (2000)	"Duck and Run" (2001)	"Be Like That" (2001)

Music video
- "Duck and Run" on YouTube

"Duck and Run" is a song by the American rock band 3 Doors Down. It was released on January 9, 2001, as the third single from their debut album The Better Life (2000). The song became the band's third consecutive number one on the Billboard Mainstream Rock Chart, staying there for three weeks. Following the terrorist attacks on September 11, 2001, the song was placed on the list of post-9/11 inappropriate titles distributed by Clear Channel. "Duck and Run" was included on the soundtrack to the 2001 movie The Hole.

== Live performances ==
"Duck and Run" was first performed live on March 12, 2000, at The Florida SpringFest in Pensacola, Florida. As of February 10, 2026, it has been performed 679 times, making it the third most performed song by 3 Doors Down.

== Track listings ==
- UK CD single
1. "Duck and Run" (album version) – 3:52
2. "Better Life" (live in Amsterdam) – 3:02
3. "Life of My Own" (live in Amsterdam) – 4:50
4. "So I Need You" (live in Amsterdam) – 3:42
- European CD single
1. "Duck and Run" (LP version) – 3:52
2. "Better Life" (live in Amsterdam) – 3:02

== Charts ==
=== Weekly charts ===
Weekly chart performance for "Duck and Run"
Chart (2001)	Peak position
US Bubbling Under Hot 100 (Billboard)	10
US Alternative Airplay (Billboard)	11
US Mainstream Rock Airplay (Billboard)	1

=== Year-end charts ===
Year-end chart performance for "Duck and Run"
Chart (2001)	Position
US Mainstream Rock Tracks (Billboard)	11
US Modern Rock Tracks (Billboard)	27

== Release history ==
Release dates and formats for "Duck and Run"
Region	Date	Format(s)	Label(s)	Ref.
United States	January 9, 2001	Active rock radio	Republic; Universal	
New Zealand	June 11, 2001	CD	Republic; Universal	
