= Kryptonite (3 Doors Down song) =

2000 single by 3 Doors Down

Single by 3 Doors Down

from the album The Better Life
- B-side: "Smack"; "Wasted Me"; "Life of My Own" (live)
- Released: January 18, 2000
- Genre: Post-grunge
- Length: 3:53
- Label: Republic; Universal
- Composers: Matt Roberts; Brad Arnold; Todd Harrell
- Lyricist: Brad Arnold
- Producer: Paul Ebersold

3 Doors Down singles chronology
"Kryptonite" (2000)	"Loser" (2000)

Music video
- "Kryptonite" on YouTube

"Kryptonite" is a song by the American rock band 3 Doors Down. It was originally released as a demo for local play by 97.9 WCPR-FM in Biloxi, Mississippi, then was picked up by several radio stations during November and December 1999. The song was officially serviced to radio as 3 Doors Down's debut single on January 18, 2000.

"Kryptonite" first charted on the US Billboard Mainstream Rock Tracks chart, reaching number one for nine weeks, then topped the Billboard Modern Rock Tracks chart for 11 weeks; it was 2000's most successful song for both rankings. It reached number three on the Billboard Hot 100, becoming the band's highest-charting single in the United States. The song was also successful internationally, peaking at number six in Canada, number seven in Australia, and number 13 in New Zealand.

== Composition and inspiration ==
The song "Kryptonite" was written by 3 Doors Down's vocalist and drummer, Brad Arnold, in a mathematics class when he was 15; it was one of the first songs he ever wrote. Considered a post-grunge track, the song is composed in the time signature of common time, the key of B minor with a tempo of "double time feel" 100 bpm, and the vocal range of B3-F♯5, according to Musicnotes.com.

About the song's meaning, Arnold has said:

That song seems like it's really just kind of like asking a question. Its question is kind of a strange one. It's not just asking, "If I fall down, will you be there for me?", because it's easy to be there for someone when they're down. But it's not always easy to be there for somebody when they're doing good. And that's the question it's asking. It's like, "If I go crazy, will you still call me Superman?" It's asking, "If I'm down, will you still be there for me?" but at the same time, "If I'm alive and well, will you be there holding my hand?" That's kind of asking, "If I'm doing good, will you be there for me? Will you not be jealous of me?" That's the basic question that song's asking, and maybe throughout the years of singing that song, I might have come up with more meanings for it than it actually might have originally had.

The band gave their demo tape to local Mississippi radio station WCPR-FM who started playing the EP version of "Kryptonite" and it became the No. 1 requested song on the station for over 15 weeks. The station's program director sent the song to manager Phin Daly who in turn showed it to Bill McGathy, his employer at In De Goot Entertainment. The band was booked in New York to perform a showcase at the CBGB music club. Daly told HitQuarters: "Once they got on stage and started playing, it was apparent the magic was in the music. So we moved to sign them."

== Music video ==
Directed by Dean Karr and filmed in March 2000, the music video presents an old man who was a big-time action hero on 1950s TV. The scene cuts between the band hanging around on the roof of the apartments where the old man lives, spying on a man harassing a woman. When the man drags her away, the old man dons his superhero suit and follows. In between shots of the old hero chasing the bad guy and failing to protect himself against a group of goths, the band is shown playing in a club (the Cowboy Palace Saloon in LA) with several other elderly people dressed as caricatures of comic villains. Several of these people are seen riding a mechanical bull during the final chorus. The video comes to a close when the old man dives through the skylight and catches the bad guy off guard, possibly knocking him out by falling on top of him. The video ends with the old man smiling, giving a thumbs up to the camera, having successfully completed his mission.

== Live performances ==
"Kryptonite" was first performed live in Pascagoula, Mississippi, on January 15, 1997. As of February 10, 2026, it has been performed 722 times, making it the most performed song by 3 Doors Down.

== Track listings ==
European CD single

1. "Kryptonite" (LP version) – 3:56
2. "Smack" (LP version) – 2:29

German CD single

1. "Kryptonite" (LP version) – 3:56
2. "Wasted Me" – 3:11
3. "Life of My Own" (live from Atlanta) – 4:36
4. "Kryptonite" (acoustic) – 3:49

European and Australian maxi-CD single

1. "Kryptonite" (LP version) – 3:55
2. "Wasted Me" – 3:11
3. "Duck and Run" (LP version) – 3:52
4. "Kryptonite" (video) – 3:53

== Personnel ==
Personnel are taken from the US promo CD liner notes.

- Brad Arnold – vocals, drums, lyrics, music
- Matt Roberts – lead guitar, rhythm guitar, music
- Chris Henderson – rhythm guitar
- Todd Harrell – bass guitar, music
- Paul Ebersold – production

== Charts ==
=== Weekly charts ===
2000–2001 weekly chart performance for "Kryptonite"
Chart (2000–2001)	Peak position
Australia (ARIA)	8
Canada Top Singles (RPM)	6
Canada Rock/Alternative (RPM)	1
Germany (GfK)	85
Netherlands (Dutch Top 40)	17
Netherlands (Single Top 100)	21
New Zealand (Recorded Music NZ)	13
UK Rock & Metal (Official Charts)	9
US Billboard Hot 100	3
US Adult Alternative Airplay (Billboard)	24
US Adult Pop Airplay (Billboard)	4
US Alternative Airplay (Billboard)	1
US Mainstream Rock Airplay (Billboard)	1
US Pop Airplay (Billboard)	1

2021 weekly chart performance for "Kryptonite"
Chart (2021)	Peak position
Canada Digital Songs (Billboard)	8
US Digital Song Sales (Billboard)	8
US Hot Rock & Alternative Songs (Billboard)	19

2026 weekly chart performance for "Kryptonite"
Chart (2026)	Peak position
Canada Hot 100 (Billboard)	50
Global 200 (Billboard)	180
US Hot Rock & Alternative Songs (Billboard)	8

=== Year-end charts ===
2000 year-end chart performance for "Kryptonite"
Chart (2000)	Position
Netherlands (Dutch Top 40)	107
New Zealand (RIANZ)	38
US Billboard Hot 100	15
US Adult Top 40 (Billboard)	25
US Mainstream Rock Tracks (Billboard)	1
US Mainstream Top 40 (Billboard)	8
US Modern Rock Tracks (Billboard)	1

2001 year-end chart performance for "Kryptonite"
Chart (2001)	Position
Australia (ARIA)	41
Canada Radio (Nielsen BDS)	78
US Billboard Hot 100	44
US Adult Top 40 (Billboard)	28
US Mainstream Top 40 (Billboard)	46

=== Decade-end charts ===
Decade-end chart performance for "Kryptonite"
Chart (2000–2009)	Position
US Billboard Hot 100	43
US Hot Rock Songs (Billboard)	3
US Mainstream Top 40 (Billboard)	22

== Certifications ==
Certifications for "Kryptonite"
Region	Certification	Certified units/sales
Australia (ARIA)	Platinum	70,000^{^}
Denmark (IFPI Danmark)	Platinum	90,000^{‡}
Germany (BVMI)	Platinum	600,000^{‡}
New Zealand (RMNZ)	6× Platinum	180,000^{‡}
United Kingdom (BPI)	Platinum	600,000^{‡}
United States (RIAA)	8× Platinum	8,000,000^{‡}
^{^} Shipments figures based on certification alone.^{‡} Sales+streaming figures based on certification alone.

== Release history ==
Release dates and formats for "Kryptonite"
Region	Date	Format(s)	Label(s)	Ref(s).
United States	January 18, 2000	Mainstream rock; active rock; alternative radio	Republic; Universal	
United States	June 5, 2000	Hot adult contemporary; modern adult contemporary radio	Republic; Universal	
United States	June 6, 2000	Contemporary hit radio	Republic; Universal	
United Kingdom	April 16, 2001	CD	Universal	

== See also ==
- Kryptonite
- Superman in other media
- Pocket Full of Kryptonite
