= When I'm Gone (3 Doors Down song) =

2002 single by 3 Doors Down

Single by 3 Doors Down

from the album Away from the Sun
- Released: September 23, 2002
- Genre: Post-grunge
- Length: 4:20
- Label: Republic; Universal
- Songwriters: Brad Arnold; Todd Harrell; Chris Henderson; Matt Roberts

3 Doors Down singles chronology
"Be Like That" (2001)	"When I'm Gone" (2002)	"The Road I'm On" (2003)

Music videos
- "When I'm Gone" (first version) on YouTube
- "When I'm Gone" (second version) on YouTube

"When I'm Gone" is a song by American rock band 3 Doors Down. It was released on September 23, 2002, as the lead single from their second album, Away from the Sun. It peaked at number four on the US Billboard Hot 100 chart and spent 17 weeks atop the Billboard Mainstream Rock Tracks chart from November 2002 to March 2003, becoming one of the longest-running number-one singles on that chart. The song also peaked at number two on the Billboard Modern Rock Tracks chart and spent one week atop the Billboard Top 40 Mainstream chart.

== Background and meaning ==
"When I'm Gone" was written by Brad Arnold, Matthew Roberts, Todd Harrell and Christopher Henderson. "There are only a few songs we've written on the road and 'When I'm Gone' is the only hit we've written on the road," Todd Harrell said on 3 Doors Down's official website. "We were playing it in Europe and could immediately tell it was something special. From day one, it got the crowd up. I always knew it would do well," Harrell continued.

Brad Arnold wrote the song thinking of unconditional love, for when being removed from loved one by miles, or time, or other obstacles. "When I'm Gone" does not necessarily mean being gone permanently. "It's asking a question, just please love me when I'm gone. And not just like when I'm dead and gone, but when I'm gonna come back. And that's kind of one thing it's about. But at the same time it's kind of about unconditional love. It's a lot of different statements it's asking of the person in that song. And it's like just the fulfillment of those different needs for every situation that it mentions. So I guess that song is just about needing someone really to be there for you unconditionally, and when you're gone," Arnold said of the song.

== Music video ==
There are two music videos for the song. The official music video was directed by The Emperor. It features the band performing live on the USS George Washington in the Mediterranean Sea on October 2, 2002. Although the lyrics don't have anything to do with the navy or war, the music video was dedicated to all military personnel serving in the United States military.

The original video features the band members in a swamp, being buried alive while playing. It was directed by Marc Klasfeld.

== Track listings ==
Australian CD1

1. "When I'm Gone" (album version) – 4:20
2. "Changes" – 3:56
3. "Living a Lie" – 3:35
4. "Pop Song" – 3:12

Australian CD2

1. "When I'm Gone" – 4:20
2. "Living a Lie" – 3:35
3. "I Feel You" – 4:07
4. "When I'm Gone" (video)

Canadian CD single

1. "When I'm Gone" – 4:15
2. "Living a Lie" – 3:35

European CD single

1. "When I'm Gone" – 4:15
2. "Changes" – 3:56
3. "Living a Lie" – 3:35
4. "Pop Song" – 3:12

== Charts ==
=== Weekly charts ===
2002–2003 weekly chart performance for "When I'm Gone"
Chart (2002–2003)	Peak position
Australia (ARIA)	64
Canada (Nielsen SoundScan)	10
Canada Radio (Nielsen BDS)	6
Canada Rock (Nielsen BDS)	1
Netherlands (Single Top 100)	95
US Billboard Hot 100	4
US Adult Pop Airplay (Billboard)	3
US Alternative Airplay (Billboard)	2
US Mainstream Rock Airplay (Billboard)	1
US Pop Airplay (Billboard)	1

2026 weekly chart performance for "When I'm Gone"
Chart (2026)	Peak position
US Hot Rock & Alternative Songs (Billboard)	15

=== Year-end charts ===
2002 year-end chart performance for "When I'm Gone"
Chart (2002)	Position
US Modern Rock Tracks (Billboard)	77

2003 year-end chart performance for "When I'm Gone"
Chart (2003)	Position
US Billboard Hot 100	5
US Adult Top 40 (Billboard)	4
US Mainstream Rock Tracks (Billboard)	3
US Mainstream Top 40 (Billboard)	10
US Modern Rock Tracks (Billboard)	13

=== Decade-end charts ===
Decade-end chart performance for "When I'm Gone"
Chart (2000–2009)	Position
US Hot Rock Songs (Billboard)	11

== Certifications ==
Certifications for "When I'm Gone"
Region	Certification	Certified units/sales
New Zealand (RMNZ)	Platinum	30,000^{‡}
United States (RIAA)	3× Platinum	3,000,000^{‡}
^{‡} Sales+streaming figures based on certification alone.

== Release history ==
Release history and formats for "When I'm Gone"
Region	Date	Format(s)	Label(s)	Ref.
United States	September 23, 2002	Mainstream rock; active rock; alternative radio	Republic; Universal	
United States	November 18, 2002	Contemporary hit; adult contemporary; hot AC radio	Republic; Universal	
Australia	November 25, 2002	CD1	Universal	
Australia	June 9, 2003	CD2	Universal	
