= Brad Arnold =

American singer (1978–2026)

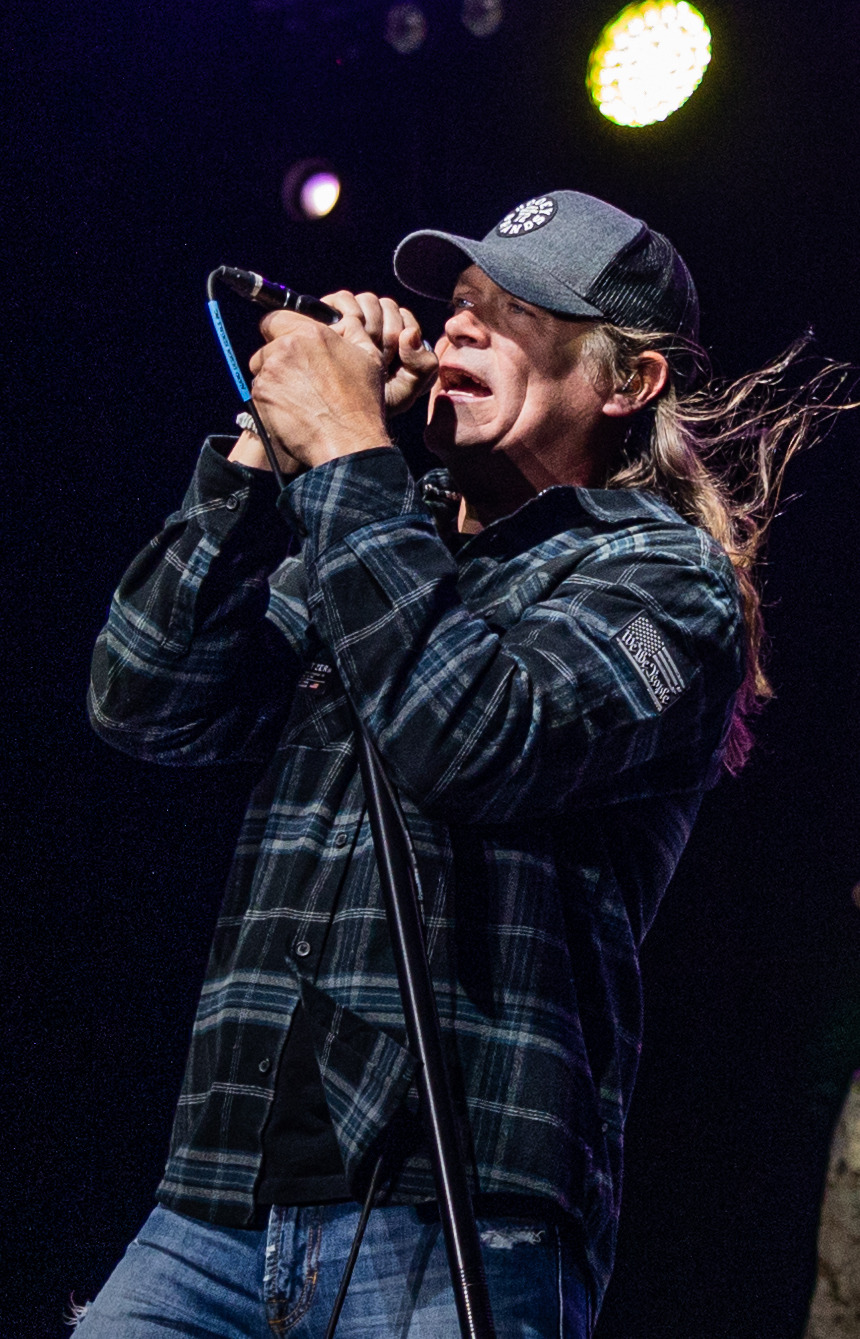
- Arnold performing with 3 Doors Down in 2023

Background information
- Born: Bradley Kirk Arnold; September 27, 1978; Escatawpa, Mississippi, U.S.
- Died: February 7, 2026 (aged 47) Meridian, Mississippi, U.S.
- Genres: Post-grunge; hard rock; alternative rock
- Occupations: Singer; songwriter
- Years active: 1996–2026
- Formerly of: 3 Doors Down
- Spouses: Terika Roberts (m. 2001; div. 2007) Jennifer Sanderford (m. 2009)

Bradley Kirk Arnold (September 27, 1978 – February 7, 2026) was an American singer, songwriter, and co-founder of the rock band 3 Doors Down with Todd Harrell and Matt Roberts, serving as its lead vocalist. The band rose to prominence with their 2000 single "Kryptonite", which Arnold wrote when he was fifteen years old.

== Early life ==
Bradley Kirk Arnold was born September 27, 1978, in Escatawpa, Mississippi.

== Career ==
Arnold was a founding member of 3 Doors Down. He was the band's lead singer and onetime drummer. Formed in 1996, the band is known for the hit songs "Kryptonite", "Here Without You", and "When I'm Gone". Both "Kryptonite" and "When I'm Gone" received Grammy nominations. Arnold wrote "Kryptonite", which was a breakout hit single for the band, in high school during mathematics class at age 15.

The band's first studio album, The Better Life, was released in February 2000 and went on to be certified 7× platinum. Released in April of that year, the single "Kryptonite" reached number three on the charts and became the band's breakout hit.

Away from the Sun, the band's second studio album, was released in November 2002 and peaked at number eight on the charts. It went platinum within two months of release and eventually went multi-platinum.

The band's third studio album, 2005's Seventeen Days, debuted at No. 1 on the Billboard 200 and has been certified platinum. 3 Doors Down released their self-titled fourth album on May 20, 2008. It debuted at No. 1 on the Billboard 200, selling 154,000 copies in its first week. It became the band's second consecutive No. 1 album on the chart after Seventeen Days, as well their fourth album to reach the Top Ten. In 2009, 3 Doors Down, along with The Soul Children of Chicago, released the song "In the Presence of the Lord" on the compilation album Oh Happy Day: An All-Star Music Celebration. In 2009, the band recorded a Christmas song called "Where My Christmas Lives", which was the first Christmas song Arnold had written.

3 Doors Down released their fifth studio album, Time of My Life, on July 19, 2011. Their first greatest hits album was released on November 19, 2012.

On January 19, 2017, 3 Doors Down performed at the pre-presidential inauguration concert of U.S. President-elect Donald Trump. Arnold told TMZ that he was proud to perform and that he thought it would be a "good experience".

In 2020, Arnold released a single entitled "Wicked Man" as a solo artist.

== Personal life ==
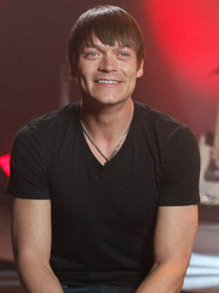
Arnold in 2011

Arnold married his first wife, his high school sweetheart Terika Roberts, in 2001, and they divorced in 2007. In 2009, he married Jennifer Sanderford, a horseback rider.

Arnold was a Christian. He became closer to his faith after having undergone rehabilitation for alcohol addiction at the encouragement of country singer Charlie Daniels. Arnold preached his faith during concerts. He was a member of World Outreach Church in Murfreesboro.

On February 1, 2006, Arnold was injured in a car collision, which also involved his wife, who was the driver of the car. "They were coming back from a casino, hit some kind of water on the road. The car hydroplaned, went down a high embankment and they hit a tree", said Arnold's bandmate Todd Harrell. Arnold also had "35 or 40 stitches" and one of his ears was sewn back.

Arnold was a recovered alcoholic, having stopped drinking in 2016.

=== Illness and death ===
In May 2025, Arnold was diagnosed with kidney cancer (Stage IV clear cell renal cell carcinoma), that metastasized to his lungs. Subsequently, 3 Doors Down canceled a planned summer concert tour that year. He died in his sleep at Baptist Anderson Regional Medical Center in Meridian, Mississippi, on February 7, 2026, aged 47. In a statement, his band said that Arnold "helped redefine mainstream rock music, blending post-grunge accessibility with emotionally direct songwriting and lyrical themes that resonated with everyday listeners".
