= Bäst Off =

Compilation album by Markoolio
- Released: 2004
- Recorded: 1998–2004
- Genre: hip hop
- Length: 1 hour, 13 minutes
- Label: Bonnier

Markoolio chronology
| Suomessa syntynyt (2004) | Bäst Off (2004) | Värsta plattan (2007) |

Bäst Off was released in 2004 and is a compilation album by Markoolio.

== Track listing ==
1. Sommar och sol - 3:11
2. Vi drar till fjällen - 2.46
3. Åka pendeltåg - 2:50
4. Mera mål - 3.47
5. Millennium 2 - 3:16
6. Gör det igen - 3:21
7. Sola och bada i Piña Colada - 3:39
8. Rocka på - 3:01 (with The Boppers)
9. Vi ska vinna! - 3:02 (with Excellence)
10. Jag orkar inte mer - 3.47
11. Vilse i skogen - 3.30
12. In med bollen (new) - 3:21
13. Biralåten - 3.53
14. Vem vill inte bli miljonär - 3:34
15. En kväll i juni - 2.58
16. Nostalgi - 3:40
17. Mister Krister Knas (NY) -2.56
18. Stackars lilla tomten - 3:12
19. Vandringsvisan (new) - 8.20
20. Replay Megamix - 3:41

=== Bonus videos ===
1. Vilse i skogen
2. In med bollen

=== DVD ===
1. Live concert
  - Videos:
2. Vi drar till fjällen
3. Åka pendeltåg
4. Sola och bada i Piña Colada
5. Millennium 2
6. Gör det igen
7. Mera mål
8. Rocka på!
9. Vi ska vinna
10. Jag orkar inte mer
  - Karaoke:
11. Mera mål
12. Jag orkar inte mer
13. Rocka på!
  - Bakom kulisserna:
14. Rocka på! (recording)
15. Jag orkar inte mer (video)
16. Filmen om Nisse

== Charts ==
=== Weekly charts ===
| Chart (2004–2005) | Peak position |
|---|---|
| Swedish Albums (Sverigetopplistan) | 9 |

=== Year-end charts ===
| Chart (2004) | Position |
|---|---|
| Swedish Albums (Sverigetopplistan) | 68 |
