= The Way I Am =

The Way I Am may refer to:

== Music ==
=== Albums ===
- The Way I Am (Ana Johnsson album), or the title song (see below)
- The Way I Am (Billy Preston album), or the title song
- The Way I Am (Colton Ford album)
- The Way I Am (Dino album), 1993
- The Way I Am (Jennifer Knapp album), or the title song
- The Way I Am (Knoc-turn'al album), or the title song
- The Way I Am (Luke Combs album), or the title song
- The Way I Am (MC Mong album), or the title song
- The Way I Am (Merle Haggard album), or the title song (see below)
- The Way I Am, an album by Patti Dahlstrom

=== Songs ===
- "The Way I Am" (Charlie Puth song), 2018
- "The Way I Am" (Eminem song), 2000
- "The Way I Am" (Ingrid Michaelson song), 2006
- "The Way I Am" (Merle Haggard song), 1980
- "The Way I Am" (Neil Sedaka song)
- "The Way I Am" (Sandra song), 2006
- "The Way I Am", a song by Ana Johnsson from Cuz I Can
- "The Way I Am", a song by Staind from The Illusion of Progress
- "The Way I Am", a song by Status Quo from Perfect Remedy

== See also ==
- "The Way I Are", a 2007 song by Timbaland
- The Way That I Am, a 1993 album by Martina McBride
- Just the Way I Am, an album by Dolly Parton
