= Ana Johnsson =

Swedish singer (born 1977)

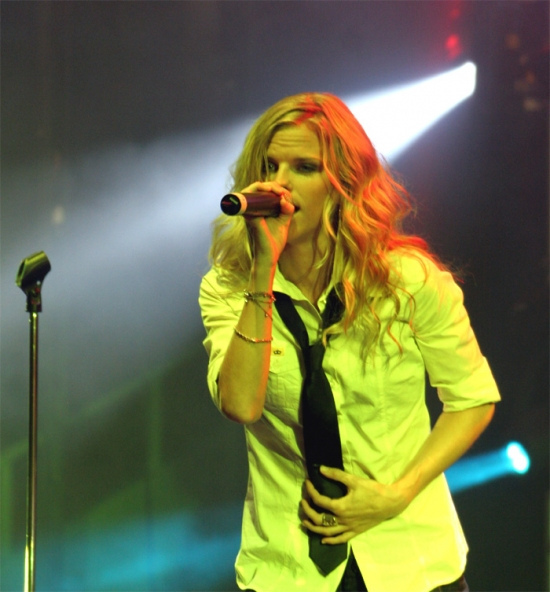
- Johnsson in 2006

Background information
- Also known as: Ana, Anna Johnsson
- Born: Anna Lovisa Johnsson (Jonsson); 4 October 1977 (age 49); Gothenburg, Sweden
- Genres: Modern rock, alternative rock
- Occupations: Singer
- Years active: 2001–2008 (on hiatus)
- Labels: Bonnier Amigo Music Group (Scandinavia); Avex Group (Eastern Asia, excluding Korea & Mongolia); Sony BMG (former); Epic Records (former)
- Website: anajohnsson.se

Anna Lovisa Johnsson (Jonsson), better known by her stage name Ana Johnsson (Swedish pronunciation: [ˈǎnːa ˈjǔːnsɔn]; born 4 October 1977), is a Swedish singer, best known for the song "We Are" from the Spider-Man 2 soundtrack.

Johnsson reached the finals of the first Swedish series of Popstars, after which she and others formed the band Excellence. They recorded one album before Johnsson left to start a solo career. Her debut album, Cuz I Can, was released in April 2004 in Sweden, followed several months later by an international release under the name The Way I Am, containing several new songs. Her second album, Little Angel, was released in October 2006. Her musical career has since been on hold.

== Career ==
=== 1999–2002: Beginnings and Excellence ===
Johnsson's singing talents became obvious when she was a teenager she moved to Karlstad and fronted cover bands named @groove and Soulcream together with her brother Petter, who played drums. The bands played cover versions of songs by among others Jamiroquai, Lenny Kravitz, Blur and the Red Hot Chili Peppers.

She made her big breakthrough through the first season of the TV series Popstars. She made it to the finals, after which she formed the R&B girl group Excellence with Jenny Bergfoth, Malin Olsson, Johanna Landt, and Susanna Patoleta. They scored five top 10 hits in Sweden, sold platinum, and completed a sold-out tour. Johnsson left the band because it was not her style of music. Excellence briefly continued as a four-piece band, during which time they recorded the official Swedish 2002 Winter Olympics song "Vi ska vinna!" with Markoolio The group split up shortly after the single was released in 2002.

=== 2002–2005: Cuz I Can and The Way I Am ===
After quitting Excellence, Johnsson started working as a solo artist. Johnsson chose 'Ana' as her stage name, to distinguish her personal life from her life as an artist, and because her real name "Anna" is a more common name. In the autumn of 2003, she released her first single, "The Way I Am". It became a radio hit in Sweden and Germany, and garnered her a nomination for the 2004 NRJ Awards. Further singles from her 2004 solo debut Cuz I Can were "Life" and "Cuz I Can". This album was only released in Sweden.

Johnsson was approached by the head of Columbia Tristar during a cruise and was invited to contribute a song to the soundtrack of Spider-Man 2 (soundtrack). Her song "We Are" was the first single off the soundtrack, and was released worldwide to high acclaim, reaching the top 10 in several countries, including the UK, Germany and Japan. Her second solo album, called The Way I Am, was released internationally. It features songs from Cuz I Can, along with half a dozen new songs, and charted highly in nearly 20 countries. Album sales exceeded 500,000 and "We Are" alone was featured on five million sold compilations throughout the world. In Japan, her album sold over 100,000 copies, earning her a gold certification charting number No. 1 for four weeks in a row. Further singles released included "Don't Cry for Pain" which was co-written and produced by Max Martin, and "Coz I Can". In the summer of 2005, "Coz I Can" was picked as the official song for the German DTM racing series, where Johnsson also performed live.

In 2005, at the NRJ Music Awards, Johnsson won awards in the categories "Best Swedish Female" and "Best Swedish Song". In Sweden, Johnsson was nominated to all of the most prestigious domestic awards, including the Grammy Award. She won the 2005 Rockbjörnen award in the category "Best Newcomer" and the European Border Breakers Award for the album 'The Way I Am". She hosted the NRJ Radio Awards ceremony in 2006.

=== 2006–2007: Little Angel ===
Johnsson's second album Little Angel was released in Sweden on 18 October 2006. The album did not make it onto the Swedish albums chart, despite both "Days of Summer" and "Exception" making it into Sweden's singles charts (peaking at number seven and ten, respectively).

"Exception" was used as the theme song to the Swedish thriller movie Exit. Johnsson also recorded the song "Fate" with the Finnish rock band Bleak and the Finnish accordionist Kimmo Pohjonen, on which Johnsson sang a duet with Bleak's lead singer. The song was used as the title song of the Finnish-Chinese movie Jadesoturi (Jade Warrior), and appeared on its soundtrack, which was released on 11 October 2006, in Finland. The movie premiered on 13 October. A music video has also been shot for the song courtesy of Eyesonlymedia. On 19 January 2007, the song received the award for "Best Nordic Song" at the NRJ Radio Awards.

"Catch Me If You Can" (2007)

In December 2006, it was announced that the song "Catch Me If You Can" had been selected as the official song for the FIS 2007 Alpine World Ski Championships in Åre, Sweden, held early February. The song became the third single off Little Angel on 17 January 2007.

Little Angel was released in Japan on 14 February 2007, with two bonus tracks: "Falling to Pieces," which was included as the B-side on the "Days of Summer" single, and a new track called "If I'm Not Dreaming." A new Japanese official website was created for the release of the album in Japan. In a message on the official website, Johnsson stated that she will be doing some promotion in Japan in late January. A deluxe edition to the Japanese release also included a DVD, containing the music video for "Exception" plus promotional and rare videos and an acoustic performances. The album peaked at number 28 on the Oricon albums chart. The album has sold over 20,500 copies in Japan as of 13 April 2007. "Exception" was released as the first single in Japan.

=== 2008–present ===
In 2008, Johnsson became the face of Invercote! (Iggesund Paperboard), of which the communication campaign in part revolved around her song "Catch Me If You Can". Johnsson performed live in two of Iggesund's private displays. An EP was also made, which featuring the tracks "We Are", "Break Through Time" and "Catch Me If You Can".

On 17 May 2012, Ana Johnsson said in an interview that "new music is guaranteed, although I will not say when". Plans for going back into the studio to record a new album during the fall of 2012 were dismissed due to personal life reasons, after which her musical career has been put on hold.

== Discography ==
=== Albums ===
Year	Album details	Peak chart positions							Sales and certifications
Year	Album details	SWE	JPN	GER	CHE	AUT	NOR	FRA	Sales and certifications
2004	Cuz I Can: Release date: 14 April 2004; Label: Bonnier Amigo; Format: CD	—	—	—	—	—	—	—	
2004	The Way I Am: Release date: 12 August 2004; Label: Bonnier Amigo/Sony BMG; Format: CD, digital download	27	4	15	19	20	27	58	JPN: 150,000+ (Gold); World: 300,000
2006	Little Angel: Release date: 18 October 2006; Label: Bonnier Amigo, Avex; Format: CD, digital download	—	28	—	—	—	—	—	JPN: 21,000
"—" denotes an album that did not chart or was not released

=== Singles ===
An empty space indicates the song was not released in that country.

Year	Title	Chart positions										Album
Year	Title	SWE	AUT	FRA	GER	IRE	ITA	NLD	NOR	SWI	UK	Album
2003	"The Way I Am"	—			82							Cuz I Can
2004	"Life"	17										Cuz I Can
2004	"Cuz I Can"	—										Cuz I Can
2004	"We Are"	4	7	21	16	28	6	16	2	28	8	The Way I Am
2004	"Don't Cry for Pain"	19	70	—	39	—	—	—	—	83	—	The Way I Am
2005	"Coz I Can"	—	—	—	73	—	—	—	—	—	—	The Way I Am
2006	"Days of Summer"	7				—			—		—	Little Angel
2006	"Exception"	10				—			—		—	Little Angel
2006	"Fate" (with Bleak)	Non-single										Jadesoturi soundtrack
2007	"Catch Me If You Can"	—							—			Little Angel
2007	"Break Through Time"	Non-single										Little Angel

== Movies and soundtracks ==
Ana Johnsson's music has been featured in various movies, such as:

Movie	Song
A2 Racer	"The Way I Am" and "Cuz I Can"
Spider-Man 2	"We Are"
Jade Warrior	"Fate" and "Days of Summer"
Exit	"Exception"
Brother Bear 2 (Swedish version)	"En Helt Ny Dag" (Welcome to This Day), "Tagit Mig Hem" (Feels Like Home), "Då Är Det Jag" (It Will Be Me) and "En Helt Ny Dag (Reprise)" (Welcome to This Day (Reprise))

Ana Johnsson also participated in the Swedish version of the Disney animated movies (although under the name "Anna Johnsson"):

- Brother Bear 2 (Swedish: Björnbröder 2) (2006) – as the voice of Nita
- Tinker Bell (Swedish: Tingeling) (2008) – as the voice of Silvermist
- Tinker Bell 2 (Tinker Bell and the Lost Treasure) (2009) (Swedish: Tingeling Och Den Förlorade Skatten) – as the voice of Silvermist

== Personal life ==
In an interview published in issue 31 of Iggesund's Inspire magazine magazine from 2009, Johnsson said that she would be moving to United States, take some time off, and start writing songs for a new album. She lived in San Diego, California, from 2009 to 2010, after which she returned to Stockholm where she currently lives. Johnsson is a mother of three boys, the first one was born in June 2011, the second in January 2013 and the third in November 2020.

Johnsson names Foo Fighters, Red Hot Chili Peppers, Creed, Erykah Badu and Jane's Addiction as some of her favorite bands.
