= Cuz I Can =

Cuz I Can may refer to:

- Cuz I Can (album), a 2004 album by the Swedish pop rock singer Ana Johnsson
  - "Coz I Can", a 2004 single from the album, also released as "Cuz I Can"
- "'Cuz I Can" (Pink song), a 2005 song
- "Cozican", a 1996 song by Hardknox from their self-titled album

== See also ==
- Because I Can (disambiguation)
