= Tjock och lycklig =

Studio album by Markoolio
- Released: 19 November 2001
- Genre: Hip hop
- Length: circa 54 minutes
- Label: Bonnier

Markoolio chronology
Dikter från ett hjärta (1999)	Tjock och lycklig (2001)	I skuggan av mig själv (2003)

Tjock och lycklig (Swedish for "Fat and Happy") is the third studio album by Swedish-Finnish artist Markoolio, which was released on 19 November 2001.

== Track listing ==
1. Arga leken (with Kristian Luuk) - 1:02
2. Rocka på! Markoolio vs. The Boppers (English: "Rock On!") - 3.02
3. Humpa Dumpa dryck (English: "Hump, Dump, Drink") - 3:14
4. Lumparpolare? (with Mikael Persbrandt) - 1:34
5. Jag orkar inte mer (English: "I Can't Take It Anymore") - 3.48
6. Vi ska vinna! (with Excellence) (English: "We Will Win!") - 3:04
7. Båtlåten (English: "Boat Song") - 3:14
8. Markooliodansen (English: "The Markoolio Dance") - 3:07
9. Sjung Halleluja! (English: "Sing Halleluja!") - 3:58
10. Pojkband (with Martin Dahlin & Magnus Hedman) (English: "Boyband") - 2:31
11. Hoppa upp & ner! (English:"Jump Up & Down!") - 3:26
12. Vem vill bli inte miljonär? (English: "Who Doesn't Want To Be A Millionaire?") - 3:36
13. Big bang! (with Robert Aschberg) - 0:48
14. Varför finns jag? (English: "Why Do I Exist?") - 3.00
15. Aldrig mer (English: "Never Again") - 4:04
16. Låt mig få sova! (English: "Let Me Sleep!") - 3.48
17. Utelistan (with Fredrik Virtanen) - 1:41
18. bonus track – Nödrimstarzan

== Charts ==
=== Weekly charts ===
Chart (2001)	Peak position
Swedish Albums (Sverigetopplistan)	1

=== Year-end charts ===
Chart (2001)	Position
Swedish Albums (Sverigetopplistan)	2
Chart (2002)	Position
Swedish Albums (Sverigetopplistan)	49
