= Life (Ana Johnsson song) =

Single by Ana

from the album Cuz I Can
- Released: February 2004
- Recorded: 2003
- Genre: Pop rock
- Length: 3:08
- Label: Bonnier Amigo
- Songwriter(s): Ana Johnsson, Jörgen Elofsson, Mathias Venge, Pontus Wennerberg
- Producer(s): Jörgen Elofsson; Mathias Venge

Ana singles chronology
"The Way I Am" (2003)	"Life" (2004)	"Cuz I Can" (2004)

Audio sample
- file; help

"Life" is a pop rock song written by Ana Johnsson, Jörgen Elofsson, Mathias Venge, and Pontus Wennerberg and recorded by the pop rock singer Ana Johnsson (as Ana). It was released as the second single in Swedish released from her (officially) first studio album Cuz I Can, which was only released in Sweden.

== Track listings ==
Download single

1. "Life" [album version] – 3:08

CD single

1. "Life" – 3:08
2. "Life" [instrumental] – 3:08

== Chart performance ==
Chart (2004)	Peak
Sweden (Sverigetopplistan)	17

== Background ==
"Life" was supposed to be the track on the Spider-Man 2 (soundtrack) instead of We Are (that was later created). When Ana was approached by the head of Columbia Tristar the first thought was that "Life" would be the track, and to be only released on the Swedish, German and Swiss versions of the soundtrack. But later We Are was created and ended up to be the track featured on the worldwide Spider-Man 2 (soundtrack)
