= Where My Christmas Lives =

Where My Christmas Lives EP

EP by 3 Doors Down
- Released: December 8, 2009 (digital)
- Recorded: 2009
- Genre: Acoustic rock; alternative rock
- Length: 30:56
- Label: Universal Republic

3 Doors Down chronology
3 Doors Down (2008)	Where My Christmas Lives EP (2009)	Time of My Life (2011)

Where My Christmas Lives is a limited-edition studio EP by the American rock band 3 Doors Down, released in 2009. The EP contains a new single, "Where My Christmas Lives", and its acoustic version, along with six acoustic versions of songs from the band's 2008 self-titled album. It is exclusively available on digital platforms such as iTunes.

== Track listing ==
All tracks are written by Brad Arnold, Matt Roberts, Todd Harrell, and Chris Henderson.

1. "Where My Christmas Lives" – 3:55
2. "It's Not My Time" (acoustic version) – 3:58
3. "It's the Only One You've Got" (acoustic version) – 4:17
4. "Your Arms Feel Like Home" (acoustic version) – 3:48
5. "Let Me Be Myself" (acoustic version) – 3:53
6. "Pages" (acoustic version) – 3:49
7. "Runaway" (acoustic version) – 3:25
8. "Where My Christmas Lives" (acoustic version) – 3:51
