= It's Not My Time =

2008 single by 3 Doors Down

Single by 3 Doors Down

from the album 3 Doors Down
- Released: February 18, 2008
- Studio: Tokyo, Japan
- Length: 4:01
- Label: Universal Republic
- Songwriters: Brad Arnold; Chris Henderson; Matt Roberts; Todd Harrell
- Producers: Johnny K; Kirk Kelsey

3 Doors Down singles chronology
| "Citizen/Soldier" (2007) | "It's Not My Time" (2008) | "Train" (2008) |

Music video
- "It's Not My Time" on YouTube

"It's Not My Time" is the lead single from the self-titled fourth studio album by the American rock band 3 Doors Down. The song was serviced to US modern rock radio on February 18, 2008. Lyrically, the song focuses on "being resilient, going against the grain and going against the world when the world's trying to push you down, or take you out," lead singer Brad Arnold said. The song topped the US Billboard Mainstream Rock Tracks chart for three weeks. An acoustic version was also available on iTunes as a pre-order.

== Background ==
"It's Not My Time" was originally written for the remake of the film The Poseidon Adventure. Brad Arnold explained: "It was gonna be a track on that movie. In the movie, they're just trying to escape their death. And there's a ship sinking. They showed me like a 30-second clip of the movie, and I went and wrote that song from it. And they wound up not wanting it, so I was like, Cool, we'll keep it. And that's actually the second song off a film like that. I wrote "Let Me Go" off of Seventeen Days for Spiderman, and they didn't want it, so we kept it. I'm glad. I had no problem with it."

== Release and chart performance ==
The song was officially added to US modern rock radio on February 18, 2008. By its first official day of release, it was the most-added track at both active- and modern-rock radio stations. The song debuted at number 37 on the Billboard Hot Mainstream Rock Tracks chart for the week of March 1, 2008. It went on to top the chart, becoming the band's eighth top-10 single and fifth number-one single on the chart. It debuted at number 38 on the Billboard Hot Modern Rock Tracks chart, eventually peaking at number five. The song peaked at number 17 on the Billboard Hot 100, making it the band's fifth top-20 hit on that chart. The song became their second number one on the Adult Top 40, following "Here Without You".

In Canada, Finland, and New Zealand, "It's Not My Time" reached the top 20, peaking at number 20 on the Canadian Hot 100, number 12 in Finland, and number 18 in New Zealand. It was their third top-40 hit in Australia, peaking at 26. It has also reached the top 40 in Germany.

== Music video ==
The video was shot in Cincinnati, Ohio, on April 1, 2008. The shoot was done in Over-the-Rhine, Fountain Square, Clifton and other locations around the city. The music video was officially premiered by Universal Republic on April 23, 2008. The beginning sequences were shot on top of the shelter structures, at Bellevue Park, edited to appear as a tall building.

The video begins with a man (Gabriel Nunez of the free-running outfit Team Tempest) standing on the roof of a pavilion in a local park. A scene then shows a mother and her daughter driving in a car. As the clock in the car turns to 10:13 they are hit from the side by a truck. The video then goes back to the man on the rooftop, who looks at his iPhone, displaying the time 10:08. When the time turns to 10:09, he immediately begins to run, and jumps off the building, landing safely on the ground.

The video then proceeds to follow the man, as he rapidly traverses on foot through the city, avoiding numerous city obstacles by performing acrobatic maneuvers of parkour. The man is shown jumping high fences, leaping across city rooftops, hopping over vehicles, somersaulting through an empty pool, among various other stunts. The video also shows the woman and her daughter in the car at several points, where the clock shows the times 10:11, and 10:12. At the end of the video, the man leaps in front of the woman's car right at 10:13, causing the woman to stop, thereby avoiding the fatal accident seen in the beginning. The band is shown throughout the video performing on the rooftop where the man started from. At the end they are seen performing on a skywalk, overlooking where the accident would have happened.

== Track listing ==
EP version

1. "It's Not My Time" – 4:03
2. "Who Are You" – 3:10
3. "It's Not My Time" (acoustic) – 3:57

== Charts ==
=== Weekly charts ===
Weekly chart performance for "It's Not My Time"
| Chart (2008) | Peak position |
|---|---|
| Australia (ARIA) | 26 |
| Austria (Ö3 Austria Top 40) | 44 |
| Canada Hot 100 (Billboard) | 20 |
| Canada Rock (Billboard) | 1 |
| Finland (Suomen virallinen lista) | 12 |
| Germany (GfK) | 37 |
| New Zealand (Recorded Music NZ) | 18 |
| Switzerland (Schweizer Hitparade) | 49 |
| US Billboard Hot 100 | 17 |
| US Adult Pop Airplay (Billboard) | 1 |
| US Alternative Airplay (Billboard) | 5 |
| US Mainstream Rock (Billboard) | 1 |
| US Pop Airplay (Billboard) | 9 |

=== Year-end charts ===
Year-end chart performance for "It's Not My Time"
| Chart (2008) | Position |
|---|---|
| Australia (ARIA) | 100 |
| Canada (Canadian Hot 100) | 54 |
| US Billboard Hot 100 | 52 |
| US Adult Top 40 (Billboard) | 4 |
| US Alternative Airplay (Billboard) | 17 |
| US Mainstream Rock (Billboard) | 8 |

== Certifications ==
Certifications for "It's Not My Time"
| Region | Certification | Certified units/sales |
|---|---|---|
| New Zealand (RMNZ) | Platinum | 30,000^{‡} |
| United States (RIAA) | 3× Platinum | 3,000,000^{‡} |
^{‡} Sales+streaming figures based on certification alone.

== Release history ==
Release dates and formats for "It's Not My Time"
| Region | Date | Format | Label | Ref. |
|---|---|---|---|---|
| United States | February 18, 2008 | Modern rock radio | Universal Republic | |
| United States | April 1, 2008 | Contemporary hit radio | Universal Republic | |
| Australia | August 25, 2008 | CD | Universal Republic | |
