= Time of My Life (3 Doors Down album) =

Studio album by 3 Doors Down
- Released: July 19, 2011
- Recorded: July–October 2010
- Studios: Los Angeles, California; Tokyo, Japan
- Genres: Alternative rock; hard rock
- Length: 41:36
- Label: Universal Republic
- Producer: Howard Benson

3 Doors Down chronology
Where My Christmas Lives EP (2009)	Time of My Life (2011)	The Greatest Hits (2012)

Singles from Time of My Life
- 1. "When You're Young" Released: January 18, 2011; 2. "Every Time You Go" Released: May 10, 2011; 3. "What's Left" Released: December 2011; 4. "Back to Me" Released: 2012; 5. "Time of My Life" Released: December 4, 2012

Professional ratings
Aggregate scores
Source	Rating
Metacritic	50/100
Review scores
Source	Rating
AllMusic	2.5/5 stars
Consequence of Sound	2.5/5 stars
IGN	8/10
Melodic.net	3.5/5 stars
Rock Sound	7/10
Rolling Stone	2/5 stars
Sputnikmusic	1/5

Time of My Life is the fifth studio album by the American rock band 3 Doors Down. It was released on July 19, 2011. The album debuted at number three on the Billboard 200 and sold 59,800 copies in its first week of its release. The singles from the album included "When You're Young", "Every Time You Go", "What's Left", "Back to Me", and the title track. It is the last album to feature Matt Roberts before his departure from the band in 2012 and his death in 2016, as well as the last for Todd Harrell before he was arrested for vehicular homicide and fired from the band in 2013. The official cover artwork was revealed on June 25, 2011. The album's track listing was revealed on July 12, 2011.

== Recording and release ==
Brad Arnold told Alternative Addiction that "he and his band mates were likely to collaborate on a new project in the near future." He then stated that the band was collaborating back and forth online. Brad says, "We've all been writing and sharing files electronically, and so when we get together I think we're going to be ready to record right away, and evolve these songs into an album."

On July 22, 2010, 3 Doors Down stated during a concert in London, Ontario, Canada that they were due to start recording their new record the very next week. They then performed a new song, confirming it was going to be on the next record, entitled "On the Run."

In October 2010, 3 Doors Down finished the recording process of the new album in Los Angeles, CA, with Grammy nominated Howard Benson taking the role as producer. On October 27, 2010, they performed at the T.J. Martell Foundation for Leukemia, Cancer and AIDS Research event held in New York City. In an interview at the event, lead singer Brad Arnold revealed the album title as Time of My Life. In addition, it was confirmed the band were looking to release the upcoming album in February 2011.

Arnold confirmed with Artisan News that the group had finished up recording, and that he "cannot wait for people to hear this record." Arnold also said that the band was hoping to release "Time of My Life" in early 2011. On March 31, 2011, 3 Doors Down announced that Time of My Life was set to be released on July 19, 2011. Brad Arnold spoke very positively of the album's heavier sound: "This record shows some growth on our part. We've had success in the past and we're very thankful for that, but there's always room to... take it up to another level. And I feel like we did that. There's a lot of songs that people can immediately identify with. We just really wanted to do our best on this record, and looking back on the whole experience, I can really say that we did."

== Singles ==
On January 10, 2011, it was confirmed the first single from the album, entitled "When You're Young", was to be released to radio the very same day.

On May 19, 2011, it was announced the second single from the album, entitled "Every Time You Go", was to be released to digital outlets on May 23, 2011.

In December 2011, it was announced the third single from the album, entitled "What's Left", was to be released on the radio.

On 2012, the fourth single from the album, entitled "Back to Me", was to be released on the radio.

On December 4, 2012, it was announced the fifth single from the album, entitled "Time of My Life", was to be released on the radio mainstream.

== Influences and themes ==
On July 6, 2011, 3 Doors Down had an interview with K-Mart Music. The band discussed several different topics ranging from their influences to where they will be touring along with the dates. Most importantly, they discussed their new album Time of my Life, and what made the album different from the past albums they have recorded. When asked the question, "What has influenced the work of 3 Doors Down the most?", frontman Brad Arnold replied, “I think the things that have influenced the work of 3 Doors Down the most is just our life experiences, and things that we’ve all gone through, and I think that all things that people really go through on a daily basis and that’s the songs that we always sit out and write are songs that people can really identify with. I hope they do identify with these songs, and I hope that everybody takes away something from these songs". The following question was, "What makes your latest album different from your previous work?". Brad responded, “I think what makes Time of My Life different from our previous works is just the fact that we went into the studio with a goal, and that goal was to make a bigger, better record that we have ever made before. I think our experience helped a lot with reaching our goal, and this album exemplifies the whole statement of having the time of our lives".

Chris Henderson, in an interview with Entertainment Focus on July 27, 2011, discussed the band's new album. When asked "What can we expect from it?" he said, "The new record is a lot in a lot of ways a lot like the very first record The Better Life because it more punkie kind of rock sounds of it. But, there’s also the songs from like our second record so it’s a good mix of what the bands been throughout the ten years we been out, well thirteen years, you know it’s a good mix of that .I’m really proud of it, and when you’re a band like us... we're not reinventing the wheel. We're not going to come out left field in the jazz fusion record, you know? We're not going to do a blues record. We're a rock band. That’s what we do so when we grow we just grow in ourselves and try to keep it interesting, by mixing all the different things that we’ve done in one record. That’s what we tried to do with this one.”

== Reception ==
Reviews for Time of My Life were generally mixed. On Metacritic, the album received a score of 49 based on four reviews.

The album debuted at No. 3 on the Billboard 200 albums chart, with 60,000 copies sold on its first week of release. It also debuted at No. 1 on the Billboard's Rock Albums chart, and No. 8 on the Canadian Albums charts. The album has sold 225,000 copies in the US as of January 2016.

== Track listing ==
All lyrics are written by Brad Arnold.

No.	Title	Music	Length
1.	"Time of My Life"	Arnold; Matt Roberts; Marti Frederiksen	3:22
2.	"When You're Young"	Arnold; Roberts; Chris Henderson; Frederiksen	4:16
3.	"Round and Round"	Arnold; Roberts; Henderson; Todd Harrell	3:46
4.	"Heaven"	Arnold; Roberts; Henderson; Zac Maloy	3:26
5.	"Race for the Sun"	Arnold; Roberts; Henderson; Harrell	2:59
6.	"Back to Me"	Arnold; Roberts; Henderson; Harrell	3:43
7.	"Every Time You Go"	Arnold; Roberts; Henderson; Bobby Huff	3:50
8.	"What's Left"	Arnold; Roberts; Henderson; Maloy	3:43
9.	"On the Run"	Arnold; Roberts; Henderson; Harrell	3:08
10.	"She Is Love"	Arnold; Roberts; Henderson; Harrell	3:16
11.	"My Way"	Arnold; Roberts; Henderson; Harrell	3:07
12.	"Believer"	Arnold; Roberts; Henderson; Harrell	3:00
Total length:			41:36

Deluxe edition bonus tracks
No.	Title	Music	Length
13.	"When You're Young" (acoustic)	Arnold; Roberts; Henderson; Frederiksen	4:15
14.	"Every Time You Go" (acoustic)	Arnold; Roberts; Henderson; Huff	3:48
15.	"The Silence Remains"	Arnold; Roberts; Henderson; Harrell	3:39
16.	"Train" (demo)	Arnold; Roberts; Henderson; Harrell	3:00

iTunes Store bonus track
No.	Title	Music	Length
17.	"What's Left" (acoustic)	Arnold; Roberts; Henderson; Maloy	3:38

Walmart deluxe edition bonus DVD (Live at Walmart Soundcheck)
No.	Title	Music	Length
1.	"When You're Young"	Arnold; Roberts; Henderson; Frederiksen	4:16
2.	"Heaven"	Arnold; Roberts; Henderson; Maloy	3:23
3.	"What's Left"	Arnold; Roberts; Henderson; Maloy	3:40
4.	"Round and Round"	Arnold; Roberts; Henderson; Harrell	3:52
5.	"Kryptonite"	Arnold; Roberts; Harrell	4:01
6.	"Away from the Sun"	Arnold; Roberts; Henderson; Harrell	3:45
7.	"Let Me Be Myself"	Arnold; Roberts; Henderson; Harrell	4:04
8.	"Interview"		7:51

== Personnel ==
Band members

- Brad Arnold – vocals
- Matt Roberts – lead guitar, backing vocals
- Chris Henderson – guitar, backing vocals
- Todd Harrell – bass
- Greg Upchurch – drums

Additional musicians

- Howard Benson – keyboards and programming
- Michito Sanches – percussion
- Kim Bullard – keyboards and programming on "When You're Young" and "Back to Me"
- Sid Page – violin on "Back to Me"
- Paul Franklin – pedal steel on "Heaven" and "What's Left"
- Marti Frederiksen – additional programming on "Time of My Life" and "When You're Young"
- Deborah Lurie – string arrangements on "When You're Young" and "Heaven"

Production

- Howard Benson – producer
- Mike Plotnikoff – recording engineer
- Hatsukazu Inagari – string engineer
- Paul Decarli – digital editing
- Marc Vangool – guitar technician
- Jon Nicholson – drum technician
- Jimmy Fahey – assistant engineer
- Chris Lord-Alge – mixer
- Keith Armstrong – assistant engineer
- Nick Karpen – assistant engineer
- Ted Jensen – mastering
- Brad Townsend – additional mixing engineer
- Andrew Schubert – additional mixing engineer
- Sandra Brummels – creative director
- Hugh Syme – art direction, design, illustrations, cover concept
- Frank W. Ockenfels III – band photography

== Charts ==
Chart (2011)	Peak position
Austrian Albums (Ö3 Austria)	7
Canadian Albums (Billboard)	8
Danish Albums (Hitlisten)	26
Dutch Albums (Album Top 100)	37
Finnish Albums (Suomen virallinen lista)	34
German Albums (Offizielle Top 100)	2
Norwegian Albums (VG-lista)	27
Swiss Albums (Schweizer Hitparade)	2
UK Albums (Official Charts)	65
US Billboard 200	3
US Top Alternative Albums (Billboard)	1
US Top Hard Rock Albums (Billboard)	1
US Top Rock Albums (Billboard)	1
US Indie Store Album Sales (Billboard)	11

== Release history ==
Region	Date	Format
Germany	July 15, 2011	Digital download
Ireland	July 15, 2011	Digital download
France	July 18, 2011	Digital download
Portugal	July 18, 2011	Digital download
Spain	July 18, 2011	Digital download
United Kingdom	July 18, 2011	Digital download
Australia	July 22, 2011	Digital download
New Zealand	July 25, 2011	Digital download
Italy	August 30, 2011	CD
