= Acoustic EP (3 Doors Down EP) =

EP by 3 Doors Down
- Released: June 27, 2005 (CD); 2006 (digital)
- Recorded: 2005
- Genre: Acoustic rock
- Length: 17:52
- Label: Republic; Universal
- Producer: Johnny K

3 Doors Down chronology
Seventeen Days (2005)	Acoustic EP (2005)	3 Doors Down (2008)

Acoustic EP is a limited edition acoustic studio EP by the American rock band 3 Doors Down, released in 2005. It was originally released exclusively at Best Buy stores to promote the band's album Seventeen Days and their 2005 tour with Staind and Breaking Benjamin. The physical disc itself is out of print, but in 2006 it was re-released digitally on iTunes and later sister service Apple Music. It was also later released on Spotify. It peaked at number 38 in the United States and number 49 in Australia. It features "Landing in London" without Bob Seger, unlike the Seventeen Days version.

== Track listing ==
All songs written by Brad Arnold, Matt Roberts, Todd Harrell, and Chris Henderson.

1. "Let Me Go" (acoustic) – 3:47
2. "Landing in London" (acoustic) – 4:44
3. "Here Without You" (acoustic) – 3:52
4. "Be Somebody" (acoustic) – 3:09
5. "My World" (acoustic) – 3:00
