= Excellence (pop group) =

Swedish pop girl group

- Origin: Sweden
- Genres: Pop, Eurodance
- Years active: 2001–2002
- Members: Ana Johnsson; Jenny Berfoth; Malin Olsson; Johanna Landt; Susanna Patoleta

Excellence was a Swedish pop girl group from 2001 created through the TV programme Popstars on Kanal 5. The group scored a number one album on the Swedish Charts, as well as five top 10 singles, and entered Melodifestivalen 2002.

They also collaborated with Markoolio on the official Swedish song for the 2002 Winter Olympics "Vi ska vinna!" Their last single was 'We can dance' which reached top 10 on the charts. The group split shortly after the single was released. Member Ana Johnsson later scored a worldwide solo hit with the song "We Are" from the Spider-Man 2soundtrack and has since then (October 2006) released her second album Little Angel.

== Discography ==
=== Album ===
Year	Album	Chart positions	Certification
Year	Album	SWE	Certification
2001	The Region of Excellence	1	Gold (40,000)

=== Singles ===
Year	Single	Chart positions	Album	Certification
Year	Single	SWE	Album	Certification
2001	"Need to Know (Eenie Meenie Miny Moe)"	1	The Region of Excellence	Platinum (30,000)
2001	"Lose It All"	5	The Region of Excellence	
2001	"What's Up?"	10	The Region of Excellence	
2002	"Vi ska vinna!" (Markoolio feat. Excellence)	3	Tjock och lycklig	
2002	"We Can Dance/Last to Know"	9		
