= Exception (song) =

Single by Ana Johnsson

from the album Little Angel
- Released: October 4, 2006
- Recorded: 2006
- Genre: Pop rock
- Length: 3:12
- Label: Bonnier Music
- Songwriters: Ana Johnsson, Dilba

Ana Johnsson singles chronology
"Days of Summer" (2006)	"Exception" (2006)	"Catch Me If You Can" (2007)

Audio sample
- file; help

"Exception" is a pop rock song recorded by the Swedish pop/rock music singer Ana Johnsson. The song was released as second single from her second studio album Little Angel on October 4, 2006. Her official Swedish website also posted that the song it to be the theme song to the Swedish thriller movie Exit, which premiered October 6, 2006 in Sweden. The single debuted at number ten in the Swedish Singles Charts.

Swedish singer Dilba co-wrote the song with Johnsson and provides some of the backing vocals on the track. Kasper Lindgren from Prime STH plays the drums on the track.

== Track listing ==
CD single

1. "Exception" [radio edit] – 3:12
2. "Exception" [remix] – 3:16

Note that on many sites track 2 is listed as 'Recall V5 Normal' but behind the CD cover it is simply listed as 'Remix'.

== Music video ==
The music video is viewable on YouTube and under media on her Swedish official web site. Also the trailer for Exit, that premiered October 6, has been added to the video archive on the official website.

In the music video, Ana is a spying in a company. Singing "I had him in my vision", she keeps an eye on her 'enemies'. After she has stolen a secret tape in the house where she's spying in too and gets in the car, she finds out it's fake and throws it out the window. The music video also contains lot of scenes from the Exit thriller. The music video was directed by Peter Lindmark, the same who directes the movie.

== Chart performance ==
Chart (2006)	Peak position
Swedish Singles Chart	10
