= When You're Young =

When You're Young may refer to:

- "When You Are Young", a song by Suede from Night Thoughts, 2016
- When You're Young (The Jam song), 1979
- When You're Young (3 Doors Down song), 2011
- "When You're Young", a song by The Atlantics
- "When You're Young", a song by Brandi Carlile from In These Silent Days

== See also ==
- When You're Young and in Love, a song by Ruby & the Romantics, covered by The Marvelettes
