= Days of Summer =

Single by Ana Johnsson

from the album Little Angel
- Released: July 12, 2006
- Recorded: 2006
- Genre: Pop rock
- Length: 3:10
- Label: Bonnier
- Songwriter(s): Ana Johnsson, Kasper Lindgren, Kalle Engström, Leif Larson
- Producer(s): Ikaros Productions

Ana Johnsson singles chronology
"Coz I Can" (2005)	"Days of Summer" (2006)	"Exception" (2006)

"Days of Summer" is Ana Johnsson's first single from her new album called Little Angel. According to Her Swedish official website, the single was released on July 12, 2006, with July 5 being the formal release date. The single debuted at number 7 in the Swedish singles chart.

== Formats and track listing ==
CD single

1. "Days of Summer" – 3:10
2. "Falling to Pieces" – 3:25

== Charts ==
Chart (2006)	Peak
Poland Charts link	1
Swedish Singles Chart	7
