= I skuggan av mig själv =

Studio album by Markoolio
- Released: 19 November 2003
- Genre: hip hop
- Length: 52 minutes
- Label: Bonnier

Markoolio chronology
Tjock och lycklig (2001)	I skuggan av mig själv (2003)	Suomessa syntynyt (2004)

I skuggan av mig själv is the fourth studio album by Swedish-Finnish singer Markoolio, released on 19 November 2003.

== Track listing ==
1. Radio Markoolio 199.99 MHz - 0:40
2. Alla borde va' som mig - 3.18
3. Vilse i skogen (med Håkan Hemlin från Nordman) - 3:31
4. Riktig artist - 3.17
5. Aj, aj, aj - 2:51
6. Radio Markoolio 199.99 MHz - 2.28
7. Nostalgi - 3:39
8. Smurfpunk - 2.34
9. Kramp - 3:27
10. Radio Markoolio 199.99 MHz - 1:39
11. Piskad som få - 3:15
12. Tommy Spandex - 3:10
13. Rashan II - 4:32
14. Baka en kaka - feat. kocken Hannu - 3.40
15. Radio Markoolio 199.99 MHz - 9:24

== Charts ==
=== Weekly charts ===
Chart (2003)	Peak position
Swedish Albums (Sverigetopplistan)	1

=== Year-end charts ===
Chart (2003)	Position
Swedish Albums (Sverigetopplistan)	19
