= The Way I Am (Ana Johnsson album) =

Studio album by Ana Johnsson
- Released: August 9, 2004
- Recorded: 2003–2004
- Genre: Pop rock
- Length: 40:41
- Label: Sony BMG
- Producer: Leif Larson, Marcus Black, Ghost, Kalle Engstrom, Micke "Nord" Anderson, Jörgen Elofsson, Mathias Venge, Martin Hansen

Ana Johnsson chronology
Cuz I Can (2004)	The Way I Am (2004)	Little Angel (2006)

Alternative covers

Alternative cover

The Way I Am is the international debut album by Swedish singer-songwriter Ana Johnsson and the second studio album overall. It was released on August 9, 2004, by Bonnier Amigo and Sony BMG. The album was the 2005 winner of the European Border Breakers Award for Sweden.

It is composed of the first seven songs of the first album, Cuz I Can, plus four new songs. The album spawned three singles: "We Are", which was the theme song from the Spider-Man 2 movie, and two songs co-written by Johnsson, "Don't Cry for Pain" and "Coz I Can", the latter making it to the top 5 most popular songs in Japan at the time of its release.

In addition to reaching the top 20 in Germany and Switzerland, The Way I Am was a commercial success in Japan, where it debuted at number four and went on to sell over 150,000 copies, receiving a Gold certification. It sold 300,000 copies worldwide.

== Track listings ==
Professional ratings
Review scores
Source	Rating
Melodic Net	2/5 stars

I like honest, hand-made music; no computer in the world can really compete with proper instruments.

— Johnsson

Standard album

No.	Title	Writer(s)	Producer(s)	Length
1.	"We Are"	Andreas Carlsson, Jörgen Elofsson	Mikael Nord Andersson, Martin Hansen	3:57
2.	"Don't Cry for Pain"	Ana Johnsson, Max Martin	Max Martin (executive) – Johan Brorson, Christian Nilsson	3:48
3.	"The Way I Am"	Ana Johnsson, Leif Larson, Marcus Black	Leif Larson, Marcus Black	3:48
4.	"I'm Stupid"	Max Martin, Prime STH	Mikael Nord Andersson, Martin Hansen	3:48
5.	"Life"	Ana Johnsson, Jörgen Elofsson, Mathias Venge, Pontus Wennerberg	Jörgen Elofsson, Mathias Venge	3:08
6.	"6 Feet Under"	Didrik and Sebastian Thott, Carl Falk, Carl Björsell	Kalle Engström, Carl Falk	3:45
7.	"Coz I Can"	Ana Johnsson, Ulf Lindström, Johan Ekhé	Ghost	3:03
8.	"Crest of the Wave"	Ana Johnsson, Ulf Lindström, Johan Ekhé	Ghost	4:50
9.	"L.A."	Ana Johnsson, Leif Larson, Marcus Black	Leif Larson, Marcus Black	3:43
10.	"Now It's Gone"	Ana Johnsson, Leif Larson, Marcus Black	Leif Larson, Marcus Black	3:43
11.	"Here I Go Again"	Ana Johnsson, Ulf Lindström, Johan Ekhé	Ghost	3:37

Includes the videos:

- On the road with... Ana Johnsson
- We Are [music video] (without the Spider-Man 2 scenes)

=== Japanese version (CD/DVD) ===
CD

1. "We Are" – 3:57
2. "Don't Cry for Pain" – 3:48
3. "The Way I Am" – 3:32
4. "I'm Stupid" – 3:48
5. "Life" – 3:08
6. "6 Feet Under" – 3:45
7. "Coz I Can" – 3:03
8. "Crest of the Wave" – 4:50
9. "L.A." – 3:44
10. "Now It's Gone" – 3:43
11. "Here I Go Again" – 3:27
12. "Black Hole" [bonus track] – 3:58

DVD

1. "We Are" [video]
2. On the Road with Ana Johnsson (photo session in Japan) [video]

=== Japanese special edition 2CD ===
CD 1

As the regular CD.

CD 2

No.	Title	Writer(s)	Producer(s)	Length
1.	"Tame Me"	Ana Johnsson, Leif Larson, Marcus Black	Leif Larson, Marcus Black	3:31
2.	"Bring It On"	Ana Johnsson, Ulf Lindström, Johan Ekhé	Ghost	2:45
3.	"What Is a Girl to Do"	Ana Johnsson, Ulf Lindström, Johan Ekhé	Ghost	3:19
4.	"Anything Goes"	Ana Johnsson, Leif Larson, Marcus Black	Leif Larson, Marcus Black	2:49
5.	"Just A Girl"	Ana Johnsson, Ulf Lindström, Johan Ekhé	Ghost	3:22

Includes the videos:

- "Coz I Can"
- "Don't Cry for Pain"

Note: The CD 2 tracks are from Johnsson's first album Cuz I Can.

== Singles ==
We Are

- Released: June 28, 2004
- Format: CD
- Label: Sony BMG, Bonnier Amigo Music
- Writer: Andreas Carlsson, Jörgen Elofsson
- Producer: Mikael Nord Andersson, Martin Hansen
- Chart position: #2 NOR, No. 4 SWE, No. 4 DEN, No. 6 ITA, No. 7 AUT, No. 8 UK, No. 16 GER, No. 16 NL, No. 16 EU, No. 21 FR, No. 28 IRE, No. 28 SUI
- Certification: Sweden: Gold (10,000+)

Don't Cry for Pain

- Released: October 25, 2004
- Format: CD
- Label: Sony BMG, Bonnier Amigo Music
- Writer: Max Martin, Ana Johnsson
- Producer: Johan Brorson, Christian Nilsson
- Chart position: #19 SWE, No. 38 GER, No. 70 AUT, No. 83 SWI

Coz I Can

- Released: March 7, 2005
- Format: CD
- Label: Bonnier Amigo Music, Sony BMG
- Writer: Ana Johnsson, Ulf Lindström, Johan Ekhé
- Producer: Ulf Lindström, Johan Ekhé
- Chart position: #19 Tokio, No. 73 GER, No. 99 EU

Black Hole

- Released: December 2004
- Format: Digital download
- Label: Sony BMG

== Charts ==
Chart (2004)	Peak position
Japanese Oricon International Album Chart ^{1}	1 (4)
Germany Album Chart	15
Swiss Album Chart	19
Austrian Album Chart	20
Swedish Album Chart	27
France Album Chart	58

- ^{1}: The International Album Chart excludes Japanese artists. Peak position in parentheses is for the full album chart. The album peaked at No. 24 at the Japanese Oricon International Albums of 2004.

=== Credits ===
Production

- Vocals, backing vocals: Ana Johnsson
- Producer, mixer, instruments – Leif Larson
- Producer, mixer, instruments – Marcus Black
- Producer, mixer, instruments, arranged, recorder – Ghost
- Producer, mixer, instruments, additional vocals – Mikael Nord Andersson, Martin Hansen
- Producer, guitar – Max Martin, Johan Brorson, Christian Nilsson
- Producer, mixer, arranged, keyboards, programming, backing vocals – Jörgen Elofsson
- Producer, mixer, arranged, instruments – Kalle Engstrom, Carlk Falk
- Producer, arranged, guitar, bass guitar, drums, programming – Mathias Venge
- Mixer, – Stefan Glaumann
- Mixer, – Bo Reimer
- programming – Peter Wennerberg
- Mastered by – Björn Engelmann at Cutting Room Studios

Additional musicians

- Drums – Nicci Notini Wallin, Sank, Lars Morten, Alar Suurna
- Drums, bass guitar – Olle Dahkstedt
- Drums, percussion – Christer Jansson
- Guitar, bass guitar – Ola Gustavsson
- Guitar – Staffan Astner
- Guitar – Mattias Blomdahl
- Bass guitar – Thomas Lindberg
- Bass guitar – Stefan Olsson
- Strings – Stockholm Session Strings
- Strings arranged and conducted by – Rutger Gunnarsson
- Background vocals – Jurl, Didrik Thott, Andreas Carlsson

Artwork

- Photography by – Ralf Strathmann
- Artwork by – Christian Bagush, dangerous. Berlin

== Release history ==
Country	Release date
Europe	August 9, 2004
Sweden	September 24, 2004
Japan	October 6, 2004
Japan (special edition)	February 9, 2005
