= Dikter från ett hjärta =

Studio album by Markoolio
- Released: 23 August 1999
- Genre: hip hop
- Length: circa 48 minutes
- Label: Arcade

Markoolio chronology
Sticker hårt (1998)	Dikter från ett hjärta (1999)	Tjock och lycklig (2001)

Dikter från ett hjärta is the second studio album by Markoolio and was released on 23 August 1999.

== Track listing ==
1. Debatt 1 - 0:59
2. Gör det igen - 3:21
3. Följ me, följ me - 2.57
4. Millennium 2 - 3:16
5. Debatt 2 - 0.43
6. Rik som ett troll - 2:58
7. Chartersemester - 3.13
8. Markoolio rider igen - 3:29
9. Debatt 3 - 0.33
10. Två snubbar och ett kex - 3:35
11. Sola och bada i Piña Colada - 3.30
12. Grillfest - 3:39
13. Du måste dansa salsa - 3.18
14. Debatt 4 - 0:04

2000 tour edition bonus tracks:

- 15. Mera mål (feat. Arne Hegerfors) - 3.48
- 16. Sola & bada i Piña Colada (karaoke version) - 3:38
- 17. Gör det igen (karaoke version) - 3.22
- 18. Vi drar till Fjällen (karaoke version) - 3:46
- 19. Millennium 2 (karaoke version) - 3.17

== Charts ==
Chart (2000)	Peak position
Sweden (Sverigetopplistan)	3
