= Landing in London =

2005 single by 3 Doors Down

Single by 3 Doors Down featuring Bob Seger

from the album Seventeen Days
- B-side: "My World"
- Released: June 8, 2005
- Recorded: 2004
- Studio: Ocean Way (Nashville, Tennessee)
- Length: 4:31 (album version); 3:59 (radio edit)
- Label: Republic; Universal
- Songwriters: Brad Arnold; Matt Roberts; Todd Harrell; Chris Henderson
- Producer: Johnny K

3 Doors Down singles chronology
| "Behind Those Eyes" (2005) | "Landing in London" (2005) | "Here by Me" (2005) |

Music video
- "Landing in London" on YouTube

"Landing in London" is the third single from American alternative rock band 3 Doors Down's third studio album, Seventeen Days (2005). The song was released in Europe on June 8, 2005, and in the United States in November of the same year, where it served as the album's fifth and final single.

== Content ==
The song is about how much someone misses somebody when that person is gone or away; in this case, the man is far away in London and also mentions other cities (Los Angeles, New York) that he has to spend time in away from the woman he loves.

In this ballad, lead singer Brad Arnold duets with Bob Seger, who happened to be recording at the same studio as 3 Doors Down in 2004, working on his album Face the Promise. Asked by the band's manager if he would like to sing on the song, Seger agreed, which had happened only on very rare occasions throughout his musical career. Previously, he had only collaborated four times with other singers and stated that he had hated it every single time. According to bass player Todd Harrell, Seger felt different about this song because it seemed like something he could have written himself. The song is reminiscent of one of Seger's own classic compositions, 1973's "Turn the Page".

== Music video ==
A music video was made for the single and premiered in early 2006. However, Seger does not appear in the video, which uses a different version of the song without his vocal part. An acoustic version of the song (also without Seger) appears on Acoustic EP.

== Live performances ==
On August 2, 2005, Seger made an unexpected guest appearance at the 3 Doors Down concert at DTE Energy Music Theatre in Clarkston, Michigan and performed "Landing in London" live with the band. Afterwards, Arnold told the crowd that they had just witnessed one of the best moments in his life. During 3 Doors Down's co-headlining tour with Daughtry, Chris Daughtry would come on stage during the song and sing Seger's vocal part.

== Track listings ==
- European CD single
1. "Landing in London" (radio edit) – 3:59
2. "Landing in London" (acoustic version) – 4:45
- European maxi-CD single
1. "Landing in London"
2. "Landing in London" (acoustic version)
3. "Let Me Go" (acoustic version)
4. "My World"

== Personnel ==
- Brad Arnold – lead vocals
- Bob Seger – co-lead vocals
- Matt Roberts – lead guitar
- Chris Henderson – rhythm guitar
- Todd Harrell – bass
- Richard Liles – drums
- The Love Sponge String Quartet – strings
- Kirk Kelsey – string arrangement, additional engineering, digital editing
- Johhny K – production, engineering
- Andy Wallace – mixing
- Tadpole – additional engineering, digital editing
- Leslie Richter – additional engineering
- Todd Schall – additional engineering

== Charts ==
Weekly chart performance for "Landing in London"
| Chart (2005–2006) | Peak position |
|---|---|
| Germany (GfK) | 79 |
| Netherlands (Dutch Top 40) | 37 |
| Netherlands (Single Top 100) | 56 |
| US Adult Contemporary (Billboard) | 32 |
| US Adult Pop Airplay (Billboard) | 31 |
| US Mainstream Rock (Billboard) | 32 |

== Release history ==
Release dates and formats for "Landing in London"
| Region | Date | Format(s) | Label(s) | Ref. |
|---|---|---|---|---|
| Europe | June 8, 2005 | CD | Republic; Universal | |
| Europe | August 2, 2005 | Maxi-CD | Republic; Universal | |
| United States | November 7, 2005 | Hot adult contemporary radio | Republic; Universal | |
| United States | November 8, 2005 | Contemporary hit radio | Republic; Universal | |
