= Behind Those Eyes =

2005 single by 3 Doors Down

Single by 3 Doors Down

from the album Seventeen Days
- Released: April 4, 2005
- Length: 4:19
- Label: Republic
- Songwriters: Brad Arnold; Matt Roberts; Todd Harrell; Chris Henderson
- Producer: Johnny K

3 Doors Down singles chronology
"Let Me Go" (2004)	"Behind Those Eyes" (2005)	"Landing in London" (2005)

"Behind Those Eyes" is a song by the American rock band 3 Doors Down. It was released on April 4, 2005, as the second single from their third studio album, Seventeen Days (2005). The song peaked at number 12 on the US Billboard Mainstream Rock chart and at number 25 on the Billboard Modern Rock chart. The song was one of the themes for WWE's WrestleMania 21.

== Charts ==
=== Weekly charts ===
Weekly chart performance for "Behind Those Eyes"
Chart (2005)	Peak position
US Alternative Airplay (Billboard)	25
US Mainstream Rock (Billboard)	12

=== Year-end charts ===
Year-end chart performance for "Behind Those Eyes"
Chart (2005)	Position
US Modern Rock Tracks (Billboard)	97
