= 3 Doors Down (album) =

2008 studio album by 3 Doors Down

Studio album by 3 Doors Down
- Released: May 20, 2008
- Recorded: June 2007 – April 2008
- Studios: New York City; Houston, Texas; Tokyo, Japan; Atlanta, Georgia
- Genres: Alternative rock; post-grunge; hard rock
- Length: 45:39 (standard edition); 53:22 (bonus tracks)
- Label: Universal Republic
- Producer: Johnny K

3 Doors Down chronology
Acoustic EP (2005)	3 Doors Down (2008)	Where My Christmas Lives EP (2009)

Singles from 3 Doors Down
- 1. "Citizen/Soldier" Released: November 2007; 2. "It's Not My Time" Released: February 19, 2008; 3. "Train" Released: May 19, 2008; 4. "Let Me Be Myself" Released: December 2, 2008

Professional ratings
Aggregate scores
Source	Rating
Metacritic	55/100
Review scores
Source	Rating
About.com	3/5 stars
AllMusic	2.5/5 stars
Blender	2/5 stars
Bloomberg News	2/4 stars
Entertainment Weekly	C+
IGN	7.1/10
The New York Times	(mixed)
Starpulse	2/5 stars
UGO	C+

3 Doors Down is the fourth album by the American rock band 3 Doors Down, released on May 20, 2008. Its first two singles, "Citizen/Soldier" and "It's Not My Time", were released in November 2007 and February 2008. Both songs entered the Billboard Hot 100, at numbers 96 and 17. "Citizen/Soldier" served as a tribute to the National Guard.

The album became the band's second consecutive number-one album on the Billboard 200, with first week sales of 154,000 units. 3 Doors Down was certified Platinum by the RIAA on December 9, 2024, and as of November 2009, it has sold 820,000 copies in the US. It is their first album to feature former Puddle of Mudd member Greg Upchurch on drums, who joined 3 Doors Down in 2005.

== Track listing ==
All tracks are written by Brad Arnold, Matt Roberts, Todd Harrell, and Chris Henderson.

No.	Title	Length
1.	"Train"	3:10
2.	"Citizen/Soldier"	3:52
3.	"It's Not My Time^{[a]}^{[b]}^{[c]}"	4:01
4.	"Let Me Be Myself"	3:48
5.	"Pages"	3:47
6.	"It's the Only One You've Got"	4:23
7.	"Give It to Me"	3:21
8.	"These Days"	3:39
9.	"Your Arms Feel Like Home"	3:44
10.	"Runaway"	3:24
11.	"When It's Over"	4:18
12.	"She Don't Want the World"	4:03
Total length:		45:39

^{a} appears on A Six Pack of Hits compilation (2008)
^{b} remixed remaster appears on The Greatest Hits compilation (2012)
^{c} acoustic recording appears on Back Porch Jam (2019)

Bonus tracks
No.	Title	Outlet	Length
13.	"Feet in the Water"	Best Buy exclusive	4:34
14.	"Who Are You"	Best Buy and UK exclusive	3:08
15.	"It's the Only One You've Got" (acoustic)	iTunes Store and international digital edition; only available when the complete album is purchased	4:15
16.	"It's Not My Time" (acoustic)	US iTunes Store pre-order; it was available as a single or when the complete album was pre-ordered	3:57
Total length:			61:33

Limited Edition DVD
No.	Title	Length
1.	"Bonus: Making of the Album"

== Personnel ==
3 Doors Down

- Brad Arnold – lead vocals
- Matt Roberts – lead guitar, backing vocals
- Chris Henderson – rhythm guitar, backing vocals
- Todd Harrell – bass
- Greg Upchurch – drums

Additional musicians

- David Davidson, David Angell, John Catchings, and Kris Wilkinson – strings
- Kris Wilkinson – strings arrangement

Production

- Johnny K – producer, engineering, strings
- Kirk Kelsey – engineering, digital editing, additional production
- Andy Wallace – mixing at East Iris Recording Studio, Nashville, TN (assisted by John O'Mahoney)
- George Marino – mastering at Sterling Sound, New York, NY
- Heather Sturm and Mike Paragone – engineering
- Steve Beers – assistant engineering
- Doug Sonders (DSp) – cover photo, staff photography
- Chapman Baehler – additional photographs
- Sandy Brummels – creative direction
- Christopher Kornmann – art direction and design at Spit and Image, NYC
- Noah Gelb – director (Limited Edition DVD)
- Philip Botti – editor (Limited Edition DVD)

== Charts ==
=== Weekly charts ===
Weekly chart performance for 3 Doors Down
Chart (2008)	Peak position
Australian Albums (ARIA)	55
Austrian Albums (Ö3 Austria)	14
Canadian Albums (Billboard)	3
Danish Albums (Hitlisten)	28
Dutch Albums (Album Top 100)	59
Finnish Albums (Suomen virallinen lista)	28
German Albums (Offizielle Top 100)	6
New Zealand Albums (RMNZ)	22
Swiss Albums (Schweizer Hitparade)	6
US Billboard 200	1
US Top Alternative Albums (Billboard)	1
US Top Rock Albums (Billboard)	1

=== Year end charts ===
Year-end chart performance for 3 Doors Down
Chart (2008)	Position
German Albums (Offizielle Top 100)	68
US Billboard 200	64
US Top Alternative Albums (Billboard)	11
US Top Rock Albums (Billboard)	16
Chart (2009)	Position
US Billboard 200	167

== Certifications and sales ==
Region	Certification	Certified units/sales
Canada (Music Canada)	Gold	40,000^{^}
Germany (BVMI)	Gold	100,000^{^}
United States (RIAA)	Platinum	820,000
^{^} Shipments figures based on certification alone.
