= Cuz I Can (album) =

Studio album by Ana Johnsson
- Released: April 14, 2004 (Sweden)
- Recorded: 2003–2004
- Genre: Pop rock
- Length: 41:18
- Label: Bonnier Amigo
- Producers: Leif Larson, Marcus Black, Ghost, Jörgen Elofsson, Mathias Venge

Ana Johnsson chronology
Cuz I Can (2004)	The Way I Am (2004)

Cuz I Can is the first solo album by the Swedish pop rock singer Ana Johnsson. The album was released by Sony Music in several European countries in April 2004.

It was later worldwide-released as The Way I Am, so that this latter is sometimes considered to be the first album by Johnsson. The latter album has a different cover and track listing; otherwise the albums are identical. The Way I Am contains the first seven songs from Cuz I Can and some new tracks, including the huge hit "We Are", which was the official soundtrack for the Spider-Man 2 film, "Don't Cry for Pain" and "Coz I Can", a remix of "Cuz I Can". The leftover tracks were included as B-sides on the later released singles.

Singles released from Cuz I Can were "The Way I Am", "Life" and "Cuz I Can", of which only "Life" entered the Swedish Singles Chart, at number 17.

== Track listing ==
No.	Title	Writer(s)	Producer(s)	Length
1.	"The Way I Am"	Ana Johnsson, Leif Larson, Marcus Black	Leif Larson, Marcus Black	3:48
2.	"Cuz I Can"	Ana Johnsson, Ulf Lindström, Johan Ekhé	Ghost	3:04
3.	"L.A."	Ana Johnsson, Leif Larson, Marcus Black	Leif Larson, Marcus Black	3:43
4.	"Now It's Gone"	Ana Johnsson, Leif Larson, Marcus Black	Leif Larson, Marcus Black	2:49
5.	"Life"	Ana Johnsson, Jörgen Elofsson, Mathias Venge, Pontus Wennerberg	Jörgen Elofsson, Mathias Venge	3:08
6.	"Crest of the Wave"	Ana Johnsson, Ulf Lindström, Johan Ekhé	Ghost	4:50
7.	"Here I Go Again"	Ana Johnsson, Ulf Lindström, Johan Ekhé	Ghost	3:37
8.	"Just A Girl"	Ana Johnsson, Ulf Lindström, Johan Ekhé	Ghost	3:22
9.	"Anything Goes"	Ana Johnsson, Leif Larson, Marcus Black	Leif Larson, Marcus Black	2:49
10.	"A Song For Everyone"	Ana Johnsson, Ulf Lindström, Johan Ekhé	Ghost	3:01
11.	"Tame Me"	Ana Johnsson, Leif Larson, Marcus Black	Leif Larson, Marcus Black	3:31
12.	"What Is A Girl To Do [+ All The Way (hidden track)]"	Ana Johnsson, Ulf Lindström, Johan Ekhé	Ghost	13:29

== Singles ==
The Way I Am

- Released: Autumn 2003
- Label: Bonnier Amigo
- Writer: Ana Johnsson, Leif Larson, Marcus Black
- Producer: Leif Larson, Marcus Black

Life

- Released: February 11, 2004
- Label: Bonnier Amigo
- Writer: Ana Johnsson, Jörgen Elofsson, Mathias Venge, Pontus Wennerberg
- Producer: Jörgen Elofsson, Mathias Venge
- Chart position: #17 Sweden

Cuz I Can

- Released: March 15, 2004
- Label: Bonnier Amigo
- Writer: Ana Johnsson, Johan Ekhé, Ulf Lindström
- Producer: Johan Ekhé, Ulf Lindström

== Credits ==
- Vocals, backing vocals: Ana Johnsson
- Producer, mixer, instruments: Leif Larson
- Producer, mixer, instruments: Marcus Black
- Producer, mixer, instruments: Ulf Lindström, Johan Ekhé
- Producer, mixer, arranged, keyboards, programming, backing vocals: Jörgen Elofsson
- Mixer: Bo Reimer
- Guitars, bass guitar: Ola Gustavsson
- Drums, percussion, Christer Jansson
- Drums: Olle Dahlsted
- Guitars: Mattias Blomdahl
- Programming: Peter Wennerberg, Anders Herrlin
- Photography by: Micke Eriksson
- Design by: Jennie Eiserman
- A&R Joakim Åström
