= Jag är konst =

Studio album by Markoolio
- Released: 3 December 2008
- Genre: pop, hip hop
- Length: 36 minutes
- Label: Sony BMG Music Entertainment

Markoolio chronology
| Värsta plattan (2007) | Jag är konst (2008) | Jag är Markoolio (2012) |

Jag är konst is the seventh studio album by Markoolio, released on 3 December 2008.

== Track listing ==
1. Mvh Markoolio - 3:33
2. The Markoolio Anthem - 3.21
3. Är det så här det är när man är kär? - 3:05
4. Vacker & rik - 3.18
5. Tack - 3:14
6. Gör min grej - 3:12
7. Längesen - 3:34
8. Första gången - 3.09
9. Hoppet kvar - 3:41
10. I dag - 3.14
11. Sverige, det bästa på vår jord (bonus track) - 3:29

== Charts ==
| Chart (2008–2009) | Peak position |
|---|---|
| Swedish Albums (Sverigetopplistan) | 30 |
