= Don't Cry for Pain =

Single by Ana Johnsson

from the album The Way I Am
- B-side: "Anything Goes", "What Is a Girl to Do"
- Released: 16 November 2004; 27 December 2004
- Recorded: 2004
- Genre: Pop rock
- Length: 3:48
- Label: Sony BMG/Bonnier Music
- Songwriter(s): Ana Johnsson, Max Martin
- Producer(s): Max Martin (executive), Johan Brorson, Christian Nilsson

Ana Johnsson singles chronology
"We Are" (2004)	"Don't Cry for Pain" (2004)	"Coz I Can" (2005)

Audio sample
- file; help

"Don't Cry for Pain" is the second single released by Swedish pop rock singer Ana Johnsson, featured on her worldwide debut album The Way I Am. The song is a rock ballad about a woman who gets beaten by her husband and steps up. There is a part of the music with a beat similar to Smells Like Teen Spirit's Intro.

== Track listings ==
EU CD single

1. "Don't Cry for Pain" [album version] – 3:47
2. "Don't Cry for Pain" [radio version] – 3:47
3. "What Is a Girl to Do" – 3:19
4. "Anything Goes" – 2:49

Bonus features:

  - "Don't Cry for Pain" [Video]
  - Weblink Gallery
  - "Don't Cry for Pain" [Ringtone]

CD single (UK CD1)

1. "Don't Cry for Pain" [album version] – 3:47
2. "Don't Cry for Pain" [radio version] – 3:47
3. "What Is a Girl to Do" – 3:19
4. "Anything Goes" – 2:49

CD single (UK CD2) / (Germany Pock It! single)

1. "Don't Cry for Pain" [album version] – 3:47
2. "Anything Goes" – 2:49

== Music video ==
The music video was shot in Los Angeles and it was directed by Antti Jokinen. Scenes of Ana and her band on the roof of a building are also shown throughout the video. Since the song is an encouragement for women who get beaten by their husbands/men to step up to the men, a similar theme is used in the video for the single. The music video begins slowly by slowing the woman, who was played by Jessica Sutta from the successful pop/R&B group The Pussycat Dolls, having an argument with a man, believed to be her boyfriend or husband. As result of the woman yelling to him, the man pushes her into a corner of the bathroom and hits her with his fist. He also slaps her when she is on the bed. When the man is gone, the woman freshens up, changes clothes and leaves the house. She runs around the houses but all doors are locked, and the phones do not work either.

In the next scene, the man is shown driving his car and playing songs on his MP3 player. He is scared when he suddenly sees Johnsson next to him. Meanwhile, the woman finds her way to escape by breaking the windows using a chair. After this, she runs away and sees the man coming home driving the car. He stops in front of her while she's standing on the road. She frightens him by making a move that implicates she's going to hit him with her fist. She grabs the MP3 player and walks away showing her middle finger towards him.

== Charts ==
Chart (2004)	Peak position
Austria (Ö3 Austria Top 40)	70
Germany (GfK)	39
Sweden (Sverigetopplistan)	19
Switzerland (Schweizer Hitparade)	83
