= Sverige, det bästa på vår jord =

Single by Markoolio

from the album Jag är konst
- A-side: "Sverige, det bästa på vår jord"
- Released: 5 May 2008
- Genre: Pop
- Label: Sony BMG Music Entertainment
- Songwriters: Sebastian Fronda, Mikael Clauss, Thomas Thörnholm
- Producers: Thomas Thörnholm, Mikael Clauss

Markoolio singles chronology
"Idollåten" (2007)	"Sverige, det bästa på vår jord" (2008)	"The Markoolio Anthem" (2008)

Sverige, det bästa på vår jord (Swedish for 'Sweden, the best on our earth'.) is a song written by Sebastian Fronda, Mikael Clauss and Thomas Thörnholm. The song won an Aftonbladet early 2008 Internet contest, applying for the Team Sweden fight song for the 2008 UEFA European Football Championship in Austria and Switzerland. The song was recorded by Markoolio and was released as a single on 5 May 2008. It also appeared on his 2008 studio album, titled Jag är konst. The song peaked at number one on the Swedish Singles Chart.

== Charts ==
Chart (2008)	Peak position
Sweden (Sverigetopplistan)	1
