= Mera mål =

2000 song by Markoolio

Single by Markoolio

from the album Dikter från ett hjärta (tour edition)
- A-side: "Mera mål"
- Released: 2000
- Genre: hip hop
- Songwriters: Jan Nordlund; John Henrik Lagerlöf; Stefan Enberg; Markoolio; Daniel Bäckström

"Mera mål" is a song written by Jan Nordlund, John Lagerlöf, Stefan Enberg, Markoolio, and Daniel Bäckström, and recorded by Markoolio. Appearing on the 2000 tour edition of the 1999 Markoolio album Dikter från ett hjärta, it was the unofficial fight song for the Sweden men's national team during the 2000 UEFA European Football Championship in Belgium and the Netherlands. Arne Hegerfors appeared in the song's music video and the song were often heard at sporting events after its release. The song charted at Trackslistan for three weeks between 13 May and 10 June 2000, peaking at number two. Furthermore, Mera mål charted for 26 weeks on the Swedish single chart, peaking at number one. That year, Mera mål was certified three times platinum in Sweden. Swedish dansband Zekes performed the song at Dansbandskampen 2009, when Markoolio was the night's theme.

== Track listing ==
1. Mera mål! (radio edit) - 3:47
2. Markoolio - Gör det igen (silicone remix 136 BPM) - 6:13
3. Mera mål! (karaoke version) - 3:51
4. Mera mål! (extended version) - 5:10

== Charts ==
Chart (2000)	Peak position
Sweden (Sverigetopplistan)	1
