= Doktor Mugg =

Swedish children's television series

Doktor Mugg is a Swedish television series, named after the program's title character. The series takes place in the fictitious town Dasseborg (Outhouseburg) and revolves around toilet humor, mugg and dass being colloquial terms for toilet in the Swedish language. Other important main characters are Kapten Filling (Captain Skivvies) and Walter Closett.

The series has been shown on Sweden's TV4 a number of times, as a part of children's programming. It has also been released on DVD.

== Story ==
Doktor Mugg is a man dressed in a black suit and has a toilet ring around his head. He is a formerly employed researcher in Dasseborg's toilet factory (which is controlled by the most powerful man in Dasseborg, Walter Closett). Doktor Mugg tries to force the citizens to buy his invention "Pruttomobilen" ("The Fartmobile"), a mobile toilet, for 85,000 Swedish krona. To make people buy his invention, he implements various devilish schemes, such as blocking people's toilet seats. However, he is always stopped by Kapten Filling, a not-so-smart superhero that in real life owns a small laundry.

== Cast ==
- Markoolio - Doktor Mugg
- Johan Petersson - Kapten Filling/Klas Kent
- Örjan Hamrin - Walter Closett
- Bengt Carlsson - Kommissarie Nödig
- Michaela de la Cour - Jenny Knip
- Vanna Rosenberg - Bajamaja
- Fredde Granberg - Reporterbröderna
- Tobias G. Kronkvist - Herr Rumplund
- Lisa Persson - The Other Voices
