= Det kommer mera =

- Genre: entertainment
- Country of origin: Sweden
- Original language: Swedish

Production
- Producers: Gunilla Nilars, Lena Fürst

Original release
- Network: SVT
- Release: 11 September 1993 – 20 April 1996

Det kommer mera was a television entertainment programme, which aired over SVT between 11 September 1993 – 20 April 1996.

Programme hosts were Arne Hegerfors and Martin Timell. Martin Timell was later replaced with Anders Lundin.
