= Little Angel =

Studio album by Ana Johnsson
- Released: October 18, 2006
- Recorded: 2005–2006
- Genre: Pop rock, post-grunge
- Length: 42:35
- Label: Bonnier (Sweden); Avex Trax (Japan)
- Producer: Leif Larson (executive), Kasper Lindgren, Kalle Engström, Tomi Malm, Mikko Raita, Pontus Frisk

Ana Johnsson chronology
The Way I Am (2004)	Little Angel (2006)

Song sample
- 31 seconds of "Catch Me If You Can": file; help

Professional ratings
Review scores
Source	Rating
Melodic	3/5 stars

Little Angel is Ana Johnsson's second album, released on October 18, 2006, in Sweden and in Japan on February 14, 2007. The album had sold over 20,500 copies in Japan by April 13, 2007.

== Album information ==
The album was recorded half in Sweden and half in Finland. Two singles were released from the album; "Days of Summer" entered the Swedish singles charts at #7 and "Exception" at #10. In Japan, the album had two bonus tracks, "Falling to Pieces" (the B-side of the "Days of Summer" single) and a completely new track, "If I'm Not Dreaming". A new Japanese website by the Avex Trax record label was made for the release of Little Angel in Japan on which Johnsson said that she would be doing some promotion in Japan at the end of January.

The Japanese release became a CD/DVD release, with the CD containing the basic album tracks featuring, two bonus tracks and a video for "Exception".

Johnsson said of the album, "I wanted a more organic feeling this time, less of computer programming. To reach that we for instance use a lot of odd, old instruments. Some inspiration obviously comes from vintage American rock/grunge. But we still wanted to keep the Swedish 'flavour'." She continued, "We really wanted an overall album feeling this time. In the dynamics, in the song sequencing, in the cover graphics, etc. I really think we’ve fulfilled these ambitions." She linked album promotion to her skiing, saying, "This is really extraordinary since I spent all my life working the slopes. I was a semi-professional snowboarder in the Rocky Mountains in the late 90s and it was excellent that some of my promotion tours around "We Are" could be combined with skiing."

"Catch Me If You Can" was the official theme of the 2007 Alpine World Ski Championships. Johnsson performed in Åre on February 2 and 3, the first two days of the Championships.

The album is dedicated to Ana Johnsson's brother; the first page of the CD jacket says "For my Brother" in white lettering on a black background.

== Track listings ==
Standard album

No.	Title	Writer(s)	Producer(s)	Length
1.	"Little Angel"	Ana Johnsson, Leif Larson	Leif Larson	2:50
2.	"Break Through Time"	Ana Johnsson, Leif Larson	Ikaros Productions	3:01
3.	"Exception"	Ana Johnsson, Dilba	Pontus Frisk	3:12
4.	"Catch Me If You Can"	Ana Johnsson, Patrik Appelgren, Micky Jonasson, Johan Larsson	Ikaros Productions	2:45
5.	"What If"	Ana Johnsson, Leif Larson	Tomi Malm; Mikko Raita	4:02
6.	"Playing God"	Ana Johnsson, Leif Larson	Tomi Malm; Mikko Raita	4:04
7.	"Burn"	Ana Johnsson, Leif Larson	Leif Larson	3:50
8.	"Days of Summer"	Ana Johnsson, Kalle Engström; Kasper Lindgren; Leif Larson	Ikaros Productions	3:11
9.	"The Harder We Fall"	Ana Johnsson, Kalle Engström; Didrik Thott	Ikaros Productions	3:46
10.	"Still"	Ana Johnsson, Leif Larson	Tomi Malm; Mikko Raita	3:50
11.	"Spit It Out"	Ana Johnsson, Ulf Lindström, Johan Ekhé	Tomi Malm; Mikko Raita	3:12
12.	"Coming Out Strong"	Ana Johnsson, Tomi Malm; Caleb	Tomi Malm; Mikko Raita	4:52

Japanese CD/DVD release

No.	Title	Writer(s)	Producer(s)	Length
13.	"Falling To Pieces"	Ana Johnsson, Kalle Engström; Didrik Thott	Ikaros Productions	3:25
14.	"If I'm Not Dreaming"	Ana Johnsson, Kalle Engström; Kasper Lindgren	Ikaros Productions	3:10

DVD

- "Exception" [music video] – 3:10
- Directed by: Peter Lindmark
- "A Day In The Life" [video]

== Singles ==
Days of Summer

- Released: July 12, 2006
- Format: CD
- Label: Bonnier Amigo Music
- Writer: Ana Johnsson, Kasper Lindgren, Kalle Engström, Leif Larson
- Producer: Ikaros Productions
- Chart position: #7 (Sweden)
- Tracks: CD single
1. "Days of Summer" – 3:10
2. "Falling to Pieces" – 3:25

Exception

- Released: October 11, 2006
- Format: CD
- Label: Bonnier Amigo
- Writer: Ana Johnsson, Dilba
- Producer: Pontus Frisk
- Chart position: #10 (Sweden)
- Tracks: CD single
1. "Exception" [radio edit] – 3:12
2. "Exception" [remix] – 3:16

Catch Me If You Can

- Released: January 17, 2007
- Format: CD
- Label: Bonnier Amigo
- Writer: Ana Johnsson, Patrik Appelgren, Micke Jonasson, Johan Larsson
- Producer: Ikaros Productions
- Tracks: CD single
1. "Catch Me if You Can" – 2:44

Break Through Time (promo single)

- Released: March 2007
- Format: CD
- Label: Bonnier Amigo
- Writer: Ana Johnsson, Leif Larsson
- Producer: Ikaros Productions
- Tracks:
1. "Break Through Time" – 3:01
2. "Fate" – 3:25

== Charts ==
Chart (2007)	Peak	Sales
Japanese Oricon Overall Albums Chart	28	21,085
Japanese Oricon English Albums Chart	9	21,085

== Credits ==
Production

- Vocals, backing vocals – Ana Johnsson
- Executive producer, mixer, engineer, instruments – Leif Larson
- Producer, backing vocals, keyboards – Tomi Malm
- Producer, mixer, guitars – Mikko Raita
- Producer, drums – Kasper Lindgren
- Producer, guitars – Kalle Engström
- Producer, instruments – Pontus Frisk
- Mixer – Lasse Martén
- Mixer – Ulf Kruckenberg
- Mastered by – Björn Engelmann at Cutting Room Studios

Additional musicians

- Guitars – Samuli Relander, Jaakko Murros, Timo Kämäräinen
- Bass guitar – Lauri Porra
- Drums – Mikko Kaakkuriniemi
- Cello – Eva Maria Hux
- Violin – Kreetta Hannula
- Cello – Tuukka Helminen
- Backing vocals (on track 3) – Dilba
- Backing vocals (on track 5) – Caleb
- Drum tech – Mikko Jr (Junior) Pietinen

Artwork

- Photography – Morgan Norman
- Additional photos – Christine Appleby, Gabor Palla
- Record sleeve and artwork – Katarina Di Leva at Yogini

== Release history ==
Country	Release date
Sweden	October 18, 2006
Japan	February 14, 2007
