= Because I Can =

Because I Can may refer to:

- Because I Can (Katy Rose album)
- Because I Can (Mice album)

== See also ==
- Cuz I Can (disambiguation)
