= Ingen sommar utan reggae =

- The cover is an imitation of the cover of Legend by Bob Marley and the Wailers

Single by Markoolio

from the album Värsta plattan
- Language: Swedish
- Released: 26 April 2007
- Recorded: 2007
- Genre: Pop, reggae
- Label: Sony BMG
- Songwriters: Johan Fjellström; Joakim Hillson; Nicklas Ternedal
- Producer: Empire Music Production

Markoolio singles chronology
"Värsta schlagern" (2007)	"Ingen sommar utan reggae" (2007)	""Emma, Emma""

"Ingen sommar utan reggae" is a Swedish song by Markoolio written by Johan Fjellström, Joakim Hillson and Nicklas Ternedal. Taken from Markoolio's album Värsta plattan, the song was recorded in "The Living Room Studio" and was produced by Empire Music Production.

The single, a pop–reggae tune inspired by Bob Marley, released in April 2007 topped the Swedish Singles Chart for 5 weeks, staying in the Top 5 for 14 weeks and in the Top 60 for a total of 22 weeks. It has been certified double platinum in Sweden.

The single contains two tracks:

- "Ingen sommar utan reggae" (3:48)
- "Ingen sommar utan reggae" (instrumental) (3:48)

Although hugely popular with the young as well as older listeners, the song came under consistent criticism for its lyrics believed to glorify alcohol and encourage its consumption in great quantities (known as binging) with suggestive lyrics like "dricka hemkört och cola, i en uppblåsbar pool" (drinking moonshine and cola in an inflatable pool) and "första vita helgen, jag tror jag dör" (in my first white/sober weekend, I believe I'm going to die).

== Charts ==
Chart (2007)	Peak position
Sweden (Sverigetopplistan)	1
