= Jag är Markoolio =

Studio album by Markoolio
- Released: 6 June 2012
- Genre: pop, hip hop
- Length: 38 minutes
- Label: Sony BMG Music Entertainment

Markoolio chronology
| Jag är konst (2008) | Jag är Markoolio (2012) |

Jag är Markoolio is the eighth studio album by Markoolio, which was released on 6 June 2012.

== Track listing ==
| No. | Title | Length |
|---|---|---|
| 1. | "En vecka i Phuket" | 3:01 |
| 2. | "Markoolio säger" | 3:51 |
| 3. | "Fredag" | 3:15 |
| 4. | "Borta bra men hemma bäst" | 3:10 |
| 5. | "Vuxenpoäng" | 3:32 |
| 6. | "Svensk sommar extra allt" | 3:22 |
| 7. | "Kebab (feat. Dogge Doggelito & Daddy Boastin')" | 3:32 |
| 8. | "Nu kör vi" | 3:07 |
| 9. | "In med bollen 2012" | 3:44 |
| 10. | "Julen svänger mer på Jamaica (feat. Dr. Alban)" | 3:23 |
| 11. | "En vecka i Phuket (Extended Version)" | 4:04 |

== Charts ==
| Chart (2012) | Peak position |
|---|---|
| Sweden (Sverigetopplistan) | 3 |
