= Sticker hårt =

Studio album by Markoolio
- Released: 22 October 1998
- Genre: hip hop
- Length: circa 44 minutes
- Label: Arcade

Markoolio chronology
Sticker hårt (1998)	Dikter från ett hjärta (1999)

Sticker hårt is the debut studio album by Swedish-Finnish singer Markoolio, released on 22 October 1998.

== Track listing ==
1. Intro - 2:36
2. Markoolio é mé - 3:48
3. Vi drar till fjällen - 3:46
4. Raggningstips 1 - 0:31
5. Drömmen om Finland - 3:32
6. Åka pendeltåg - 2:49
7. Raggningstips 2 - 3:11
8. Sommar och sol - 3:04
9. Party på ett skitigt hotell - 3:04
10. Bira låten - 3:52
11. Raggningstips 3 - 0:37
12. Allan Ballan - 3:32
13. Rashan ringde - 3:19
14. Raggningstips 4 - 0:39
15. Den 24:e december - 7:27

== Charts ==
Chart (1998–1999)	Peak positions
Sweden (Sverigetopplistan)	4
