= Coz I Can =

"Cuz I Can"
- 2005 version ("Coz I Can") artwork

Single by Ana Johnsson

from the album Cuz I Can and The Way I Am
- Released: 2004 (original); 2005 (remix)
- Genre: Pop rock
- Length: 3:04
- Label: Bonnier Music, Epic
- Songwriter(s): Ana Johnsson, Ulf Lindström, Johan Ekhé
- Producer(s): Ghost

Ana Johnsson singles chronology
"Life" (2004)	"Cuz I Can" (2004)	"We Are" (2004)
"Don't Cry for Pain" (2004)	"Coz I Can" (2005)	"Days of Summer" (2006)

Audio sample
- file; help

"Cuz I Can" is the third single by Swedish pop rock singer Ana Johnsson released from her first studio album, Cuz I Can. The single was released only in Sweden in 2004.

After Johnsson obtained recognition from her worldwide hit single "We Are", she decided to re-release the song. In 2005, the song was re-mixed as "Coz I Can" and released as the third and final single from Ana Johnsson's worldwide first studio album, The Way I Am. This version charted within the top 75 in Germany and was also released in Japan.

== Lyrical content ==
Ana Johnsson quotes:

The lyrics are incredibly important to me. Some of them tell of the experiences I have already had in the mad world of pop biz, some are pure fiction. The assertion that looks are so important - some girls really believe that they need to look like Barbie dolls with a naked midriff. That's just crazy ...!

== Track listings ==
=== "Cuz I Can" ===
CD single

1. "Cuz I Can" – 3:04
2. "Bring It On" – 2:45
3. "Cuz I Can" (alternative mix) – 2:39

=== "Coz I Can" ===
German Pock It! CD single

1. "Coz I Can" – 3:02
2. "Tame Me" – 3:33

Japanese single

1. "Coz I Can" – 3:02
2. "We Are" (video version) – 3:54

International maxi-CD single

1. "Coz I Can" – 3:02
2. "Tame Me" – 3:33
3. "Just a Girl" – 3:22
4. "Coz I Can" (video)
5. "Coz I Can" (making of the video)
6. Gallery

== Charts ==
Chart (2005)	Peak position
Germany (GfK)	73
