= Train (3 Doors Down song) =

Single by 3 Doors Down

from the album 3 Doors Down
- Released: May 19, 2008
- Length: 3:11
- Label: Universal; Republic
- Songwriters: Brad Arnold; Chris Henderson; Matt Roberts; Todd Harrell
- Producers: Johnny K; Kirk Kelsey

3 Doors Down singles chronology
"It's Not My Time" (2008)	"Train" (2008)	"Let Me Be Myself" (2008)

"Train" is the second rock single from 3 Doors Down's fourth album, 3 Doors Down. The song was released as a rock radio promo on May 19, 2008. The demo version appears on the deluxe edition of the band's 2011 album Time of My Life.

"Train" debuted at No. 33 on the Mainstream Rock chart and peaked at No. 10. It reached No. 29 on the Modern Rock Tracks chart. It was the band's ninth top 10 single on the Mainstream Rock chart.

== Charts ==
=== Weekly charts ===
Weekly chart performance for "Train"
Chart (2008)	Peak position
US Alternative Airplay (Billboard)	29
US Mainstream Rock (Billboard)	10

=== Year-end charts ===
Year-end chart performance for "Train"
Chart (2008)	Position
US Mainstream Rock Songs (Billboard)	35
