= In med bollen =

Single by Markoolio

from the album Fotbollsfeber
- Released: 2004
- Genre: Hip hop
- Label: Bonnier Music
- Songwriters: Daniel Bäckström; Stefan Enberg; Markoolio

"In med bollen" is a song written by Stefan Enberg, Markoolio, Daniel Bäckström and Hans Schumacher, and recorded by Markoolio in 2004, acting as the official fight song for the Swedish men's national team during the UEFA Euro 2004 in Portugal. Tommy Söderberg contributed with vocals in the song and Shirley Clamp featured as a choir girl.

Released as a single in 2004, it topped the Swedish singles chart, as well as appearing on the soccer compilation album Fotbollsfeber. The song also charted at Trackslistan for three weeks between 5–19 June 2004 with positions 16, 17 and 19. The song also charted at Svensktoppen for two weeks between 20–27 June 2004 with positions 8 respective 10. before leaving chart.

A Framåt fredag version was called In kom snöfyllda moln, describing traffic situation upon the arrival of winter in Sweden.

== Track listing ==
1. In med bollen - 3:22
2. In med bollen (karaok eversion) - 3:23
3. In med bollen (radio edit) - 3:02

== Charts ==
=== Weekly charts ===
Chart (2004)	Peak position
Sweden (Sverigetopplistan)	1

=== Year-end charts ===
Chart (2004)	Position
Sweden (Sverigetopplistan)	9
