= Web of Night =

Single by T.M.Revolution

from the album Music from and Inspired by Spider-Man 2
- Released: July 28, 2004
- Genre: J-pop
- Length: 3:53
- Label: Sony Music JP
- Songwriters: Akio Inoue; Daisuke Asakura

T.M.Revolution singles chronology
"Albireo" (2004)	"Web of Night" (2004)	"ignited" (2004)

"Web of Night" is a single by Japanese vocalist T.M.Revolution. It is one of two exclusive songs from the Japanese release of the Spider-Man 2 soundtrack. The song was released on July 28, 2004 Sony Music for the Japanese market only.

== Single information ==
This single includes both English and Japanese versions of the song as well as the orchestrated track "Tears Macerate Reason". Despite the fact that Web of Night has not been released commercially in the U.S., the song has been performed by T.M.Revolution both in Baltimore at OTAKON2003 and in Anaheim Pacific Media Expo in 2004.

== Track listing ==
1. "Web of Night"
2. "Tears Macerate Reason" (Dedicated to Spiderman2)
3. "Web of Night" (English Version)
