= Lovelace Watkins =

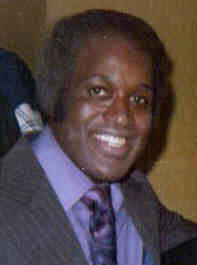
- Watkins in 1974

Background information
- Born: Lovelace Allen Watkins; March 6, 1933; New Brunswick, New Jersey, U.S.
- Died: June 11, 1995 (aged 62) Glendale, California, U.S.
- Genres: Pop
- Occupation: Musician
- Instruments: Vocals; guitar
- Years active: 1960s to 1990s
- Labels: MGM, York Records

Lovelace Watkins (March 6, 1933 – June 11, 1995) was an American, Las Vegas-based singer and performer (also nicknamed "The Black Sinatra").

== Biography ==
Watkins was born in New Brunswick, New Jersey, in 1933. He was of African, Indian, and Spanish heritage. His mother gave birth to him at fourteen, and he was raised by his grandmother.

He studied microbiology at Rutgers University and trained as a boxer. He was invited to the Royal Command Performance for the Queen of the United Kingdom. He appeared on The Ed Sullivan Show in 1961 while promoting his album, The Big, Big Voice of Lovelace Watkins. Lovelace also appeared on the Johnny Carson and Mike Douglas shows.

He made his debut at the Wookey Hollow nightclub; he was later recalled for a second show one week later. He performed at the London Palladium on November 15, 1971, in front of Queen Elizabeth II. His third Wookey Hollow cabaret appearance was recorded and televised on BBC One at 11:35 pm on May 8, 1974. Following this, Lovelace Watkins at the attendance record at the "Talk Of The Town" in London, England. Watkins appeared on the British religious variety series Stars on Sunday. In 1974, Lovelace did a ten-week long summer season at the ABC Theatre in Blackpool. The shows were sold out.

=== Australia ===
Watkins had a long association with Australia's Gold Coast. He helped raise money for the city following the floods in 1974. He was named "Ambassador at large" by Gold Coast Mayor Keith Hunt. Watkins recorded two songs; they were "We Love The Gold Coast" by Clyde Collins and "On The Gold Coast" by Tom Louch from Victoria. The single was released on the Finooks Folly label.

=== South Africa ===
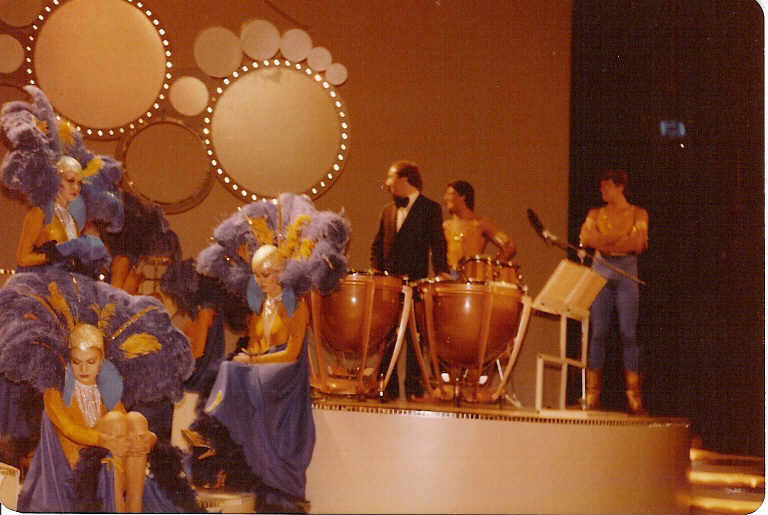
Rehearsal of "Lovelace Watkins Special", South African Broadcasting

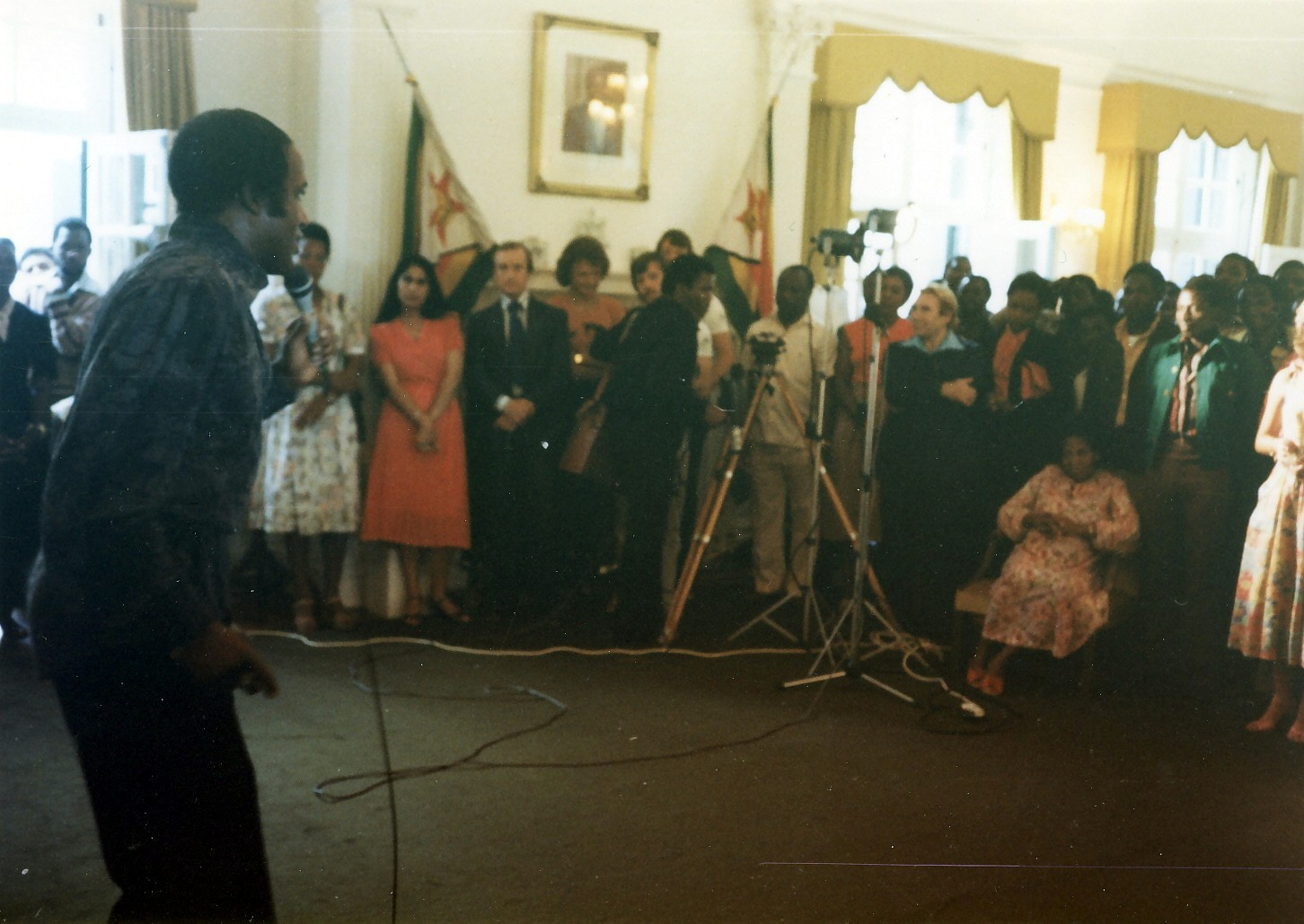
Lovelace performing at the Presidential Palace in Harare, Zimbabwe

In South Africa, he received two gold albums, and a public parade was held in his honor. In apartheid South Africa, Watkins was the guest of honor at a woman's banquet. He was pictured in The Sunday Express dancing with a white woman; the hotel almost lost its license.

== Personal life and death ==
In March 1972, he married Anna Marie Fitzsimmons of Salford, Lancashire, and their son was born in 1972; the marriage later ended. Nearing the end of his music career, Watkins started a company that prepared apartments and commercial buildings for rental companies in the Las Vegas area, and continued singing at various functions in Las Vegas. He died of leukemia in 1995.

== Releases ==
Singles
Title	Release info	Year	Notes
"Hello Young Lovers" / "When I Fall In Love"	MGM K 12875	1960	United States release
"Tender Love" / "Ma Cherie Au Revoir"	Groove 58-0016	1963	United States release
"I Won't Believe It" / "He's Lookin' Out For The World"	Groove 58-0023	1963	United States release
"Who Am I" / "Dreams"	Sue 10-003	1964	United States release
"I Apologise Baby" / "You Can't Stop Love"	Fontana TF 879	1967	United Kingdom release
"Now You're Gone" / "You Made Me So Very Happy", "Spinning Wheel"	York SYK 504	1971	United Kingdom release
"Someday Man" / "Take My Hand"	York SYK 509	1971	United Kingdom release
"Angel She Was Love" / "Get Ready"	York SYK 513	1972	United Kingdom release
"Rain Falls Anywhere It Wants To" / "Sing No Sad Songs For Charlie"	York SYK 522	1972	United Kingdom release
"Country Road" / "Tell Her That It's Snowing"	York SYK 533	1972	United Kingdom release
"Let Them Play A Sad Song" / "Sing No Sad Songs For Charlie"	York SYK 546	1973	United Kingdom release
"My Love Forgive Me" / "The Single Man"	York YR 213	1974	United Kingdom release
"The Way I Am" / "Everybody Wants To Call You Sweetheart"	York YR 217	1974	United Kingdom release (Charted in South Africa, released on the Gallo Label)
"We Love The Gold Coast" / "On The Gold Coast"	Finooks Folly FF 1001	1980	Australia only release

Albums
Title	release info	Year	Notes
The Big, Big Voice Of Lovelace Watkins	MGM Records E3831	1960	
Love Is	UNI Records 73068	1969	
Recorded Live At The Talk Of The Town	York Records LYK 901, York Records LYK 902	1971	
Love Makes The World Go Round	York Records FYK 404	1972	
Live In South Africa	Gallo – GL 1759	1974	
Lovelace 'Live' 77	Polydor 2398 014	1977	
A Gift Of Love	J & B Records JB 273	1986	Australia only release
