= Arne Hegerfors =

Swedish sports journalist (1942–2024)

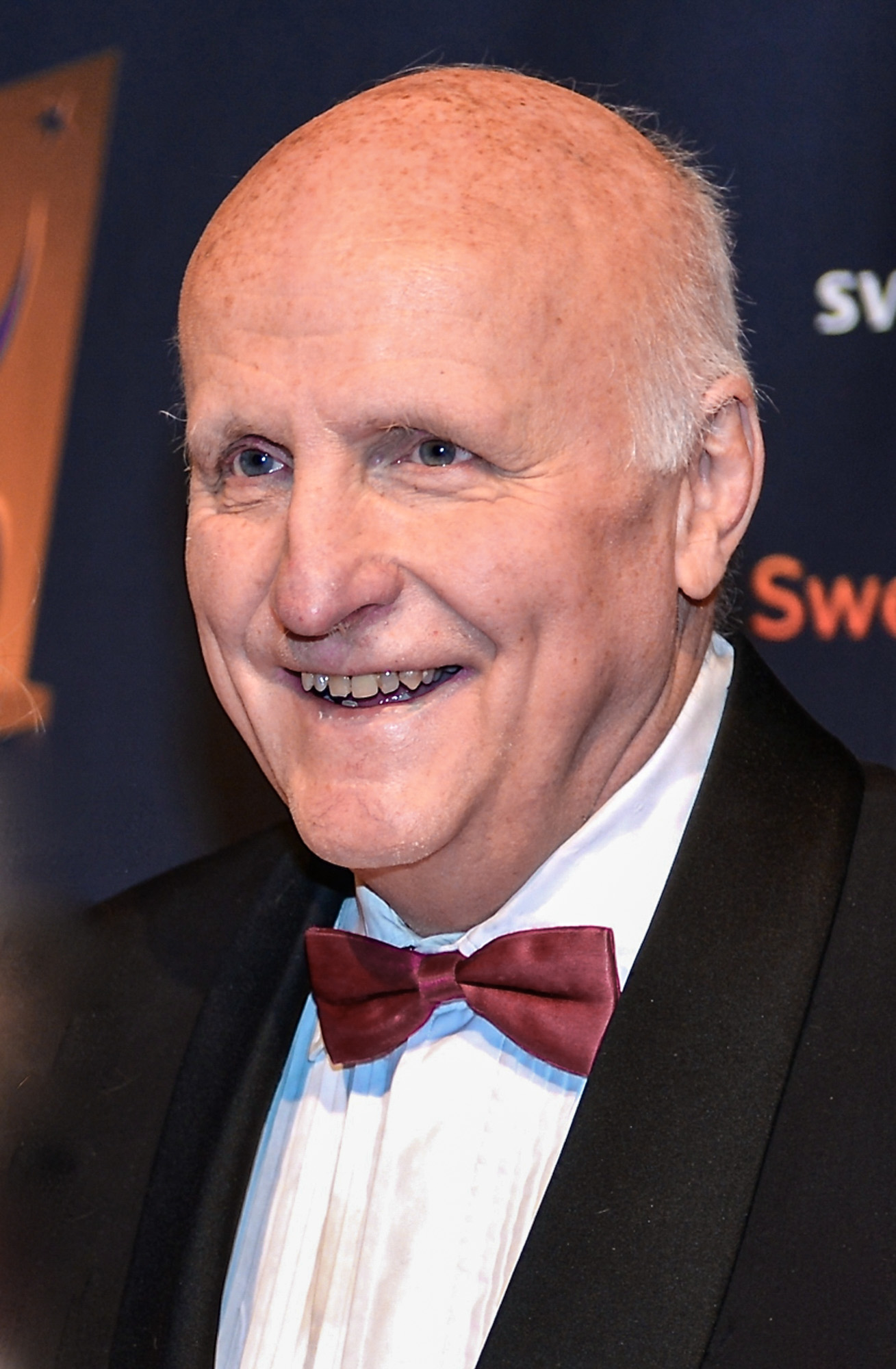
- Hegerfors in 2014
- Born: Olof Arne Hegerfors; 4 July 1942; Gothenburg, Sweden
- Died: 29 January 2024 (aged 81); Stockholm, Sweden
- Occupations: Sports journalist; sports commentator; television presenter

Olof Arne Hegerfors (Swedish pronunciation: [ˈûːlɔf ˈɑ̂ːɳɛ ˈhêːɡɛrfɔʂ]; 4 July 1942 – 29 January 2024) was a Swedish sports journalist and television presenter. He had a long career in television spanning from television presenter on Sveriges Television and to sports commentator on Canal Plus.

== Early life ==
Hegerfors was born on 4 July 1942 in Gothenburg, Sweden, the son of Torsten Hegerfors, a university lecturer, and his wife Anna Maria (née Pettersson). He was the brother of the journalist, cartoonist and author Sture Hegerfors. He passed studentexamen in 1964 and completed university studies in Gothenburg between 1966 and 1967.

== Career ==
Hegerfors began his career as an employee at Göteborgs Handels- och Sjöfartstidning from 1964 to 1966 and at Kvällsposten in 1966. He worked at Sveriges Radio in Gothenburg from 1967 to 1969 and at the sports section of Sveriges Television (SVT) in Stockholm from 1969.

Hegerfors is mostly known as a sports commentator on SVT and Canal Plus from 1969 until 2011. He was awarded the Stora Journalistpriset in 1992.

Hegerfors had a promising career in football and had a contract offer from a French football club, OGC Nice. But after a serious knee injury he could not play any more and moved on to a career in journalism. Lars-Gunnar Björklund started a sports department at SVT (known as Sveriges Radio-TV until 1979) in Gothenburg and recruited Hegerfors.

In 2000, Hegerfors appeared in Markoolio's music video for his song "Mera mål", where he acted as himself. He has also presented entertainment shows for SVT, like Kryzz. He won the Swedish television Kristallens Honour Award in 2008.

Hegerfors made several memorable commentaries in ice hockey and football matches. He was SVT's correspondent at the Heysel Stadium disaster in 1985 when 39 people died and 376 were injured during a UEFA Champions League final between Liverpool and Juventus. He also commentated on the basketball final between the Soviet Union and the United States at the 1972 Olympic Games which the Soviet Union won 50–49 after a disputed refereeing decision in the last seconds.

Hegerfors was also known for making entertaining jokes as a commentator. He retired in 2011.

Between 1993 and 1996, Hegerfors was the television presenter for the SVT show Det kommer mera, along with Martin Timell. Hegerfors also published one book, entitled Ralf: en gör så gôtt en kan! ("Ralf: he does his very best").

== Personal life ==
In 1983, he married Kerstin Johansson (born 1953), the daughter of district veterinarian Algot Johansson and nurse Ingrid (née Montelius). He had met his future wife in 1978. The couple had two children together. Hegerfors also had a child from a previous marriage.

Hegerfors died on 29 January 2024, at the age of 81 following a brain tumour. He had previously had both a heart attack and a stroke within a period of four years.

== Bibliography ==
- Edström, Ralf; Hegerfors, Arne (1973). Ralf: en gör så gôtt en kan! (in Swedish). Bromma: Williams. ISBN 91-31-00181-5. SELIBR 7238558.
