= Värsta plattan =

Studio album by Markoolio
- Released: 11 April 2007
- Genre: pop, hip hop
- Length: 39 minutes
- Label: Sony BMG Music Entertainment

Markoolio chronology
Suomessa syntynyt (2004)	Värsta plattan (2007)	Jag är konst (2008)

Värsta plattan is the sixth studio album by Swedish-Finnish singer Markoolio, released on 4 April 2007.

== Track listing ==
1. Kungen ringer Markoolio - 2:37
2. Värsta schlagern (duet with Linda Bengtzing) - 3.01
3. Ingen sommar utan reggae - 3:48
4. Markoolio söker till Idol - 0.50
5. Idollåten - 4:15
6. Emma Emma (duet with Tilde Fröling) - 3.33
7. Markoolio kommer till kalaset - 1:34
8. Min lilla mojo-grej - 3.41
9. Rymden runt på 24 dar - 3:09
10. Vad gör du - 3.18
11. Partypest - 4:15
12. Betalningen - 1.11
13. Pimpar loss - 3:50
14. Värsta schlagern videon

== Charts ==
Chart (2007)	Peak position
Swedish Albums (Sverigetopplistan)	2
