= Citizen/Soldier =

Single by 3 Doors Down

from the album 3 Doors Down
- Released: November 2007
- Recorded: 2007
- Genre: Post-grunge
- Length: 5:15
- Label: Universal Republic
- Songwriters: Brad Arnold; Chris Henderson; Matt Roberts; Todd Harrell
- Producers: Johnny K; Kirk Kelsey

3 Doors Down singles chronology
"Live for Today" (2005)	"Citizen/Soldier" (2007)	"It's Not My Time" (2008)

Music video
- "Citizen/Soldier" on YouTube

"Citizen/Soldier" is a single by the American rock band 3 Doors Down from their self-titled fourth studio album. The song was released as a single in November 2007 in conjunction with a recruitment campaign by the United States National Guard. The lyrics convey the band's views regarding the actions performed by the Guard. It was released as the third single for American active rock and mainstream rock radio stations in November 2008, while it is their fourth overall single.

A music video (directed by Antoine Fuqua) released to movie theaters, the National Guard website, and other outlets portrays the history of the Guard and employs current members of the Guard as actors. The Citizen/Soldier promotion was also featured on the #88 Hendrick Motorsports car driven by Dale Earnhardt Jr. during the 2008 NASCAR Sprint All-Star Race on May 17, 2008. 3 Doors Down was featured on a Busch Series car that Earnhardt owned in 2003, and was driven by Tony Stewart.

Most of the footage for the video was filmed at Camp Roberts, an active Army National Guard Base on California's Central Coast. The Beach scenes were filmed at Morro Bay.

== Charts ==
Chart performance for "Citizen/Soldier"
Chart (2008–09)	Peak position
Canada Hot 100 (Billboard)	59
US Billboard Hot 100	96
US Mainstream Rock (Billboard)	19

== Certifications ==
Certifications for "Citizen/Soldier"
Region	Certification	Certified units/sales
United States (RIAA)	Gold	500,000^{^}
^{^} Shipments figures based on certification alone.
