= When You're Young (3 Doors Down song) =

Single by 3 Doors Down

from the album Time of My Life
- Released: January 18, 2011
- Recorded: July–October 2010 in: Los Angeles, California
- Length: 4:14
- Label: Universal Republic
- Songwriters: Arnold; Roberts; Chris Henderson; Frederiksen
- Producer: Howard Benson

3 Doors Down singles chronology
"Shine" (2010)	"When You're Young" (2011)	"Every Time You Go" (2011)

Music video
- "When You're Young" on YouTube

"When You're Young" is the first single from the American rock band 3 Doors Down's fifth studio album, Time of My Life. The single was issued to radio on January 18, 2011, and released digitally on iTunes on February 1. It is now their 10th top 10 single on the mainstream rock chart.

The song was featured in a then-farewell tribute to Edge that aired on the night he surrendered the World Heavyweight Championship on the April 15, 2011 edition of WWE SmackDown after he announced on WWE Raw four days earlier that he was forced to retire due to being diagnosed with cervical spinal stenosis stemming from his 2003 neck injury. The song was also included as a downloadable track for the video game Rock Band 3 as part of the 3 Doors Down track pack.

== Song meaning ==
3 Doors Down lead singer Brad Arnold said of the song, "I think it's a song that a lot of people can identify with. There's somebody out there who needs to hear this song, and I hope they hear it. So many times, older people look at young kids and say, "Enjoy this time! It's the best time of your life," when it's really not. Being young is hard. Everything's in front of you for the first time. Those things that are in front of you seem so much bigger than they do when you're looking back on them. I'm 32 now and looking back on my teenage years and before, a lot of it doesn't seem as hard as it did then because now it's behind me and I hardly remember it. You get the responsibilities of the world as an adult. However, when you were in high school, there was nothing bigger than that test on Friday. Now, you don't even remember what test it was. It's hard to be young. The song discusses that."

== Charts ==
Chart (2011)	Peak position
US Billboard Hot 100	81
US Billboard Rock Songs	22
US Billboard Alternative Songs	31
US Billboard Adult Top 40	28
US Billboard Mainstream Rock	9

== Music video ==
On March 23, 2011, the official video for the song was uploaded to YouTube. The video, in black and white, depicts a street with many men dressed in black suits walking on it. A young girl is seen on the street, looking around. Eventually, she falls over and her glasses are stepped on by one of the men in suits, at which point the others begin laughing at her. A young man appears and she gets up, only to be separated from him by the crowd. This is interspersed with shots of the band playing in the street.
