= Let Me Be Myself =

Single by 3 Doors Down

from the album 3 Doors Down
- Released: December 2, 2008 (radio)
- Recorded: 2007 in Houston and Tokyo
- Length: 3:48
- Label: Universal; Republic
- Songwriters: Brad Arnold; Chris Henderson; Matt Roberts; Todd Harrell
- Producers: Johnny K; Kirk Kelsey

3 Doors Down singles chronology
"Train" (2008)	"Let Me Be Myself" (2008)	"The Champion in Me" (2008)

Music video
- "Let Me Be Myself" on YouTube

"Let Me Be Myself" is the second main single (fourth, counting the promo singles "Citizen/Soldier" and "Train") by rock band 3 Doors Down from their eponymous fourth studio album. The song was released on December 2, 2008. The song is a power ballad, similar to previous hits by the band, "Be Like That" and "Here Without You".

== Song meaning ==
"Let Me Be Myself" was written by Bradley Kirk Arnold, Matthew Darrick Roberts, Christopher Lee Henderson and Robert Todd Harrell. Lead singer, Brad Arnold, said the song has a lot of meaning to him personally, and cited it as his favorite track from the album. During a performance of the song on the famous New York City rock station, K-Rock, he stated that the song "is about just being yourself, without thinking of what people say". Arnold told Artist Direct: "Let Me By Myself" is simply about standing in the light and being yourself. It's so easy to get lost being what someone else wants you to be and forgetting about who you want to be. That song is about getting back to those things, being happy with yourself and who you are."

== Music video ==
The music video for the song is an incorporation of GEICO's cavemen. The music video follows around the GEICO caveman, who runs away from a party after not fitting in. Throughout the video, he is constantly approached by humans whom he pushes away. At the end of the video he meets up with several other caveman at the local bowling alley where he finally relaxes and has a good time. The video also includes actor Michael Raymond-James from True Blood.

The music video was preceded by about a month by a GEICO commercial featuring the song along with a scene reminiscent of the last scene of the music video. The commercials, however, ended differently in that the Caveman became depressed when he saw that the bowling alley's pinsetter was sponsored by GEICO, and prominently displayed their slogan "So Easy A Caveman Can Do It." The music video ended on a happier note and does not feature the GEICO logo at all.

== Chart performance ==
"Let Me Be Myself" debuted at number 38 on Billboard's Adult Top 40 chart, peaking at number 12. The song also reached number four on the Hot AC Recurrent chart.

=== Weekly charts ===
Chart (2008–09)	Peak position
Australian ARIA Singles Chart	29
German Singles Chart	41
US Billboard Bubbling Under Hot 100 Singles	21
US Billboard Adult Top 40	12

=== Year-end charts ===
Chart (2009)	Position
US Adult Top 40	38

== Certifications ==
Region	Certification	Certified units/sales
United States (RIAA)	Gold	500,000^{‡}
^{‡} Sales+streaming figures based on certification alone.

== Release history ==
Release dates and formats for "Let Me Be Myself"
Region	Date	Format	Label(s)	Ref.
United States	December 2, 2008	Mainstream airplay	Universal Republic	
