= Vi drar till fjällen =

Single by Markoolio

from the album Sticker hårt
- A-side: "Vi drar till fjällen"
- B-side: "24:e december"
- Released: 1 March 1998
- Genre: hip hop
- Label: Arcade Music Company Sweden
- Songwriters: Daniel Bäckström, Stefan Enberg, Marko Kristian Lehtosalo, Hans Schumacher
- Producer: Triple Jay

Vi drar till fjällen (Swedish for "We're headin' for the mountains") is a song written by Daniel Bäckström, Stefan Enberg. Marko Kristian Lehtosalo and Hans Schumacher, released as a single on 1 March 1998. The song also appeared on Markoolio's debut studio album "Sticker hårt", released later in 1998. The single topped the Swedish singles chart on 18 February 1999. It also received a Svensktoppen test on 27 February 1999 but failed to enter the chart. Elise and Jemma Myrberg are also featured in the song.

== Charts ==
=== Weekly charts ===
Chart (1999)	Peak position
Norway (VG-lista)	4
Sweden (Sverigetopplistan)	1

=== Year-end charts ===
Chart (1999)	Positions
Sweden (Sverigetopplistan)	10
