= The Way I Am (Neil Sedaka song) =

Single by Lovelace Watkins
- B-side: "Everybody Wants To Call You Sweetheart"
- Released: 1974
- Label: Gallo PD 1040
- Songwriter(s): Neil Sedaka

The Way I Am was a hit for Lovelace Watkins in South Africa. It reached the position of no 6 and stayed on the charts for 14 weeks in 1974. It also made it to no 12 in Rhodesia in 1974.

== Background ==
Neil Sedaka's single "The Way I Am" backed with "Going Nowhere" was released in Holland in 1974 on the Polydor label. The song by Lovelace Watkins was released on the Gallo label with the Randy Edelman composition "Everybody Wants To Call You Sweetheart" as its B side.

== Chart performance ==
It peaked at No. 4 in South Africa on November 15, 1974. It spent a total of 14 weeks on the South African charts.

== Releases ==
- "The Way I Am" / "Everybody Wants To Call You Sweetheart" - Gallo PD 1040 - 1974
- "The Way I Am" / "Everybody Wants To Call You Sweetheart" - Gallo PD. 1040 - 1974
- "The Way I Am" / / "Everybody Wants To Call You Sweetheart" - York YR 217 - 1974
