= Vi ska vinna! =

Single by Markoolio & Excellence

from the album Tjock och lycklig
- A-side: "Vi ska vinna!"
- B-side: "Vi ska vinna!"
- Released: 28 January 2002
- Genre: hip hop
- Label: Bonnier Music
- Songwriters: Daniel Bäckström, Stefan Enberg, Marko Kristian Lehtosalo, Hans Schumacher
- Producers: Daniel Bäckström, Hans Schumacher

Vi ska vinna! was written in 2001 by Daniel Bäckström, Stefan Enberg, Marko Kristian Lehtosalo ("Markoolio") and Hans Schumacher and performed by Markoolio together with the band Excellence. It was the fight song for Sweden during the 2002 Olympic Winter Games in Salt Lake City, Utah, United States. The song appeared on Markoolio's 2001 studio album Tjock och lycklig and was released as a single on 28 January 2002, peaking at number three on the Swedish Singles Chart.

The song received a Svensktoppen test on 9 February 2002 but failed to enter chart.

The single version featured rewritten refrain lyrics, replacing "Vi ska vinna, vi ska ta dom, vi ska göra köttfärs av dom" ("we'll win, we'll get them, we'll make ground meat out of them") with "Vi ska vinna, vi ska ta dom, vi ska göra losers av dom" ("we'll win, we'll get them, we'll make losers out of them") following the September 11 attacks of 2001 in the United States. The lines "Jag har sagt upp mig från mitt jobb, så jag inte missar nå't när Ludmila åker bob" ("I've quit my job, so I don't miss anything when Ludmila rides the bobsliegh") were also changed, following the November 2001 Ludmila Engquist doping scandal.

== Charts ==
Chart (2002–2003)	Peak position
Sweden (Sverigetopplistan)	3
