= Millennium 2 =

Single by Markoolio

from the album Dikter från ett hjärta
- A-side: "Millennium 2" (radio hit version)
- B-side: "Millennium 2" (dunka dunka version)
- Released: 20 October 1999
- Genre: Eurodance
- Label: Arcade Music Company Sweden
- Songwriters: Jan Nordlund, John Henrik Lagerlöf, Stefan Enberg and Daniel Bäckström
- Producer: Triple Jay

Markoolio singles chronology
"Sola och bada i Piña Colada" (1999)	"Millennium 2" (1999)	"Gör det igen" (2000)

"Millennium 2" is a song written by Jan Nordlund, John Henrik Lagerlöf, Stefan Enberg and Daniel Bäckström, and recorded by Markoolio on his 1999 album Dikter från ett hjärta. It was also released as a single on 20 October 1999 and topped the Swedish Singles Chart.

Textually, the song deals with the transition from 1999 to the year 2000.

The song charted at Trackslistan between 30 October – 4 December 1999 and also received a Svensktoppen test on 4 December 1999, but failed to enter the chart.

== Charts ==
=== Weekly charts ===
Chart (1999–2000)	Peak position
Sweden (Sverigetopplistan)	1

=== Year-end charts ===
Chart (1999)	Position
Sweden (Sverigetopplistan)	2
Chart (2000)	Position
Sweden (Sverigetopplistan)	88
