= Spider-Man 2 (soundtrack) =

2004 album

Spider-Man 2: Music from and Inspired by

Soundtrack album by various artists
- Released: June 22, 2004
- Genres: Alternative rock; post-grunge; hard rock; pop rock; pop punk; emo
- Length: 60:29
- Labels: Columbia; Sony Music Soundtrax
- Producer: Laura Wasserman

Singles from Spider-Man 2: Music from and Inspired by
- 1. "Vindicated" Released: May 31, 2004; 2. "We Are" Released: June 28, 2004; 3. "Web of Night" Released: July 28, 2004 (Japan); 4. "Ordinary" Released: August 17, 2004; 5. "Najane Kyun" Released: 2004 (Pakistan)

Spider-Man 2: Music from and Inspired by is the soundtrack album for the 2004 film Spider-Man 2, released on June 22, 2004. As a whole, the album reached the top 10 of the U.S. album charts and the top 40 of the Australian album charts. "Vindicated" by Dashboard Confessional reached the top of a world composite soundtrack chart in June 2004 and the top 20 of a composite world and U.S. modern rock chart. "We Are" by Ana Johnsson was a major success in Europe, charting in almost every European country. "Ordinary" by Train was on the U.S. adult top 40 singles charts. "I Am" by Killing Heidi was added to the Australian version of the soundtrack and released as a single in the country. It debuted and peaked at number 16 on the country's ARIA Charts on July 19, 2004.

== Track listing ==
The track listing for the U.S. version of the soundtrack is:

No.	Title	Writer(s)	Producer(s)	Length
1.	"Vindicated" (Dashboard Confessional)	Christopher Carrabba	Don Gilmore	3:20
2.	"Ordinary" (Train)	Pat Monahan; Bart Hendrickson	Don Gilmore	3:33
3.	"Did You" (Hoobastank)	Douglas Robb; Markku Lappalainen; Daniel Estrin; Chris Hesse	Howard Benson	3:18
4.	"Hold On" (Jet)	Nic Cester	Dave Sardy	4:03
5.	"Gifts and Curses" (Yellowcard)	Yellowcard	Neal Avron	5:05
6.	"Woman" (Maroon 5)	Adam Levine	Mark Batson	5:08
7.	"This Photograph Is Proof (I Know You Know)" (Taking Back Sunday)	Taking Back Sunday	Lou Giordano	4:12
8.	"Give It Up" (Midtown)	Gabriel Saporta; Midtown	Butch Walker	3:42
9.	"Lucky You" (Lostprophets)	Lostprophets	Eric Valentine	4:25
10.	"Who I Am" (Smile Empty Soul)	Sean Danielsen; John Lewis Parker	John Lewis Parker	3:15
11.	"The Night That the Lights Went Out in NYC" (The Ataris)	Kris Roe	Lou Giordano	3:36
12.	"We Are" (Ana)	Jörgen Elofsson; Andreas Carlsson	Martin Hansen; Mikael Nord Andersson	3:55
13.	"Someone to Die For" (Jimmy Gnecco featuring Brian May)	Alain Johannes; Natasha Shneider; Chris Cornell	Rick Rubin	5:08
14.	"Spidey Suite" (Danny Elfman)	Danny Elfman	Danny Elfman	4:01
15.	"Doc Ock Suite" (Danny Elfman)	Danny Elfman	Danny Elfman	3:53

== International pressings ==
Many versions of the soundtrack outside the United States contained additional tracks by artists exclusive to their native countries.

- In the UK version of the soundtrack, Switchfoot's hit single "Meant to Live" is featured as track 12 between "The Night That the Lights Went Out in NYC" and "We Are".
- On the Australian version of the soundtrack, "I Am" by Killing Heidi appears as track 17.
- On the Japanese version of the soundtrack, "Web of Night" by T.M. Revolution appears and was a popular single in Japan. A track by indie band Mew called "She Spider" was also featured on the Japanese release.
- On the Pakistani,Indian version of the soundtrack, a song by Strings titled "Najane Kyun" which translates to "Don't Know Why" was used.
- On the Polish version of the soundtrack, the single "Chron to co masz" by PtakY appears as track 17.
- In Brazil, the band Jota Quest recorded the "Theme from Spider-Man", which was included as track 16.
- On the Indonesian version of the soundtrack, "Cry Out" by Edane was included as the last track of the pressings, with an official video music released.

== Omissions ==
- 3 Doors Down's single "Let Me Go" was originally intended for the soundtrack but was withheld and instead featured on their third album, Seventeen Days.
- The song "Where I Belong" by Sia was earmarked to appear on the soundtrack, but owing to a record label conflict, its inclusion was withdrawn. The single's cover art features Sia dressed in a Spider-Man costume.
- The closing credits of the film featured a version of the theme from the original television cartoon series performed by Canadian crooner Michael Bublé. While not featured on the album, it was released as a single to promote the film, and contained remixes by Junkie XL and Ralphi Rosario.

== Charts ==
=== Weekly charts ===
Chart (2004)	Peak position
Australian Albums (ARIA)	25
Austrian Albums (Ö3 Austria)	22
Canadian Albums (Billboard)	15
French Albums (SNEP)	83
German Albums (Offizielle Top 100)	35
Swiss Albums (Schweizer Hitparade)	30
US Billboard 200	7
US Soundtrack Albums (Billboard)	1

=== Year-end charts ===
Chart (2004)	Position
US Billboard 200	127
US Soundtrack Albums (Billboard)	4

== Certifications ==
Region	Certification	Certified units/sales
United States (RIAA)	Gold	500,000^{^}
^{^} Shipments figures based on certification alone.

== Spider-Man 2: Original Motion Picture Score ==
Spider-Man 2: Original Motion Picture Score

Film score by Danny Elfman
- Released: July 27, 2004
- Recorded: April 2004
- Studios: Sony Scoring Stage, Culver City
- Genre: Film score
- Label: Sony BMG
- Producer: Danny Elfman

Danny Elfman chronology
Big Fish (2003)	Spider-Man 2: Original Motion Picture Score (2004)	Charlie and the Chocolate Factory (2005)

Although the soundtrack contains a portion of Danny Elfman's score, a more complete album of the film music was released as Spider-Man 2: Original Motion Picture Score. Tracks 10 and 11 are listed as "Bonus Tracks" as they were not used in the film (John Debney and Christopher Young reworked several cues of the score, in addition to music from the first film being tracked in). The score is performed by a 110-piece ensemble of the Hollywood Studio Symphony, conducted by Pete Anthony.

=== Track listing ===
All tracks are written by Danny Elfman.

No.	Title	Length
1.	"Spider-Man 2 (Main Title)"	3:21
2.	"M.J.'s New Life/Spidus Interruptus"	2:31
3.	"Doc Ock Is Born"	2:23
4.	"Angry Arms/Rebuilding"	2:51
5.	"A Phone Call/The Wrong Kiss/Peter's Birthday"	2:06
6.	"The Bank/Saving May"	4:27
7.	"The Mugging/Peter's Turmoil"	3:21
8.	"Doc Ock's Machine"	1:42
9.	"He's Back!"	1:50
10.	"Train/Appreciation"	6:16
11.	"Aunt May Packs"	2:51
12.	"Armageddon/A Really Big Web!"	6:28
13.	"The Goblin Returns"	1:36
14.	"At Long Last, Love"	2:59
15.	"Raindrops Keep Fallin' on My Head" (Performed by B. J. Thomas)	3:14

=== Instrumentation ===
- Strings: 30 violins, 14 violas, 14 cellos, 8 double basses
- Woodwinds: 3 flutes, 2 oboes, 3 clarinets, 3 bassoons
- Brass: 12 French horns, 4 trumpets, 6 trombones, 2 tubas
- Percussion: 6 players
- 2 harps, 1 piano
