= We Are (Ana Johnsson song) =

2004 single by Ana Johnsson

- Scandinavian artwork

Single by Ana Johnsson

from the album The Way I Am and Music from and Inspired by Spider-Man 2
- Released: 28 June 2004
- Length: 3:57
- Label: Bonnier Music; Columbia; Epic
- Songwriters: Andreas Carlsson; Jörgen Elofsson
- Producers: Mikael Nord Andersson; Martin Hansen

Ana Johnsson singles chronology
"Cuz I Can" (2004)	"We Are" (2004)	"Don't Cry for Pain" (2004)

Alternative cover
- European two-track CD single artwork

Audio sample
- file; help

"We Are" is a song by the Swedish rock singer Ana Johnsson from her worldwide debut album, The Way I Am. The song was released as her first worldwide single and the first from the album in June 2004. It was also included on the soundtrack for Spider-Man 2. "We Are" remains Johnsson's highest-charting hit, becoming a top-10 hit in Austria, Denmark, Italy, Norway, Sweden, and the United Kingdom.

== Music video ==
The music video was shot in Los Angeles at the Nate Starkman & Son building (Pan Pacific Warehouse), and it was directed by Antti Jokinen. The video mixes clips from Spider-Man 2 with a romantic scenario involving Ana Johnsson and a man from the apartment next door. To convey the intensity of Johnsson's performance, the producer created an effect where the loudness of the music seems to cause the furnishings of the man's apartment to slide across the floor.

== Track listings ==
Scandinavian CD single

1. "We Are" (video version) – 3:57
2. "We Are" (radio version) – 3:54
3. "We Are" (Location mix) – 3:59

European CD single

1. "We Are" (video version) – 3:57
2. "We Are" (Location mix) – 3:59

European maxi-CD single

1. "We Are" (video version) – 3:57
2. "We Are" (radio version) – 3:54
3. "We Are" (Location mix) – 3:59
4. "The Way I Am" (alternate acoustic mix) – 3:26
5. "We Are" (music video)
6. Spider-Man 2 content

UK CD single

1. "We Are" (radio version) – 3:54
2. "Cuz I Can" – 3:03
3. "Bring It On" – 2:45
4. "We Are" (original version video)

== Charts ==
=== Weekly charts ===
Chart (2004)	Peak position
Austria (Ö3 Austria Top 40)	7
Belgium (Ultratip Bubbling Under Flanders)	9
Belgium (Ultratop 50 Wallonia)	28
Denmark (Tracklisten)	6
France (SNEP)	21
Germany (GfK)	16
Ireland (IRMA)	28
Italy (FIMI)	6
Netherlands (Dutch Top 40)	16
Netherlands (Single Top 100)	32
Norway (VG-lista)	2
Scotland Singles (OCC)	7
Sweden (Sverigetopplistan)	4
Switzerland (Schweizer Hitparade)	28
UK Singles (OCC)	8

=== Year-end charts ===
Chart (2004)	Position
Austria (Ö3 Austria Top 40)	70
Germany (Media Control GfK)	70
Sweden (Hitlistan)	17
UK Singles (OCC)	196

== Certifications ==
Region	Certification	Certified units/sales
Sweden (GLF)	Gold	10,000^{^}
^{^} Shipments figures based on certification alone.

== Release history ==
Region	Date	Format(s)	Label(s)	Ref.
Europe	28 June 2004	Maxi-CD	Epic; Columbia	
United Kingdom	2 August 2004	CD	Epic; Columbia	
