= Seventeen Days =

Studio album by 3 Doors Down
- Released: February 8, 2005
- Studio: Ocean Way (Nashville, Tennessee)
- Genres: Alternative rock; post-grunge
- Length: 44:11
- Label: Universal
- Producer: Johnny K

3 Doors Down chronology
Another 700 Miles (2003)	Seventeen Days (2005)	Acoustic EP (2005)

Singles from Seventeen Days
- 1. "Let Me Go" Released: November 22, 2004; 2. "Behind Those Eyes" Released: April 4, 2005; 3. "Landing in London" Released: June 8, 2005; 4. "Here by Me" Released: July 25, 2005; 5. "Live for Today" Released: August 1, 2005

Professional ratings
Review scores
Source	Rating
AllMusic	3/5 stars
Entertainment Weekly	C+
Rolling Stone	2/5 stars

Seventeen Days is the third studio album by the American rock band 3 Doors Down. It was released on February 8, 2005, five years after the release of their first album, The Better Life. It is the band's first album to debut atop the Billboard 200, and received both gold and platinum certifications by the Recording Industry Association of America (RIAA) on March 14, 2005. Its lead single, "Let Me Go", became the album's only song to enter the Billboard Hot 100, peaking at number 14. The album features a duet with Bob Seger on the single "Landing in London", and is the only 3 Doors Down studio album with Daniel Adair on drums, who left the group to join the Canadian rock band Nickelback in 2005.

== Recording ==
The album's name comes from the band only having seventeen days off in between finishing up their Away from the Sun tour and returning to the studio to start pre-production on the recording process.

== Track listing ==
All tracks are written by Brad Arnold, Matt Roberts, Todd Harrell, and Chris Henderson.

No.	Title	Length
1.	"Right Where I Belong"	2:32
2.	"It's Not Me^{[a]}"	3:14
3.	"Let Me Go^{[b]}^{[c]}^{[d]}"	3:52
4.	"Be Somebody^{[b]}"	3:15
5.	"Landing in London^{[b]}" (featuring Bob Seger)	4:31
6.	"The Real Life^{[e]}"	3:52
7.	"Behind Those Eyes"	4:19
8.	"Never Will I Break"	3:50
9.	"Father's Son"	4:12
10.	"Live for Today"	3:47
11.	"My World^{[b]}^{[e]}"	3:00
12.	"Here by Me"	3:47
Total length:		44:11

^{a} live recording appears on Another 700 Miles EP (2003)
^{b} acoustic recording appears on Acoustic EP (2005)
^{c} appears on A Six Pack of Hits compilation (2008)
^{d} remixed remaster appears on The Greatest Hits compilation (2012)
^{e} acoustic recording appears on Back Porch Jam (2019)

US DualDisc edition bonus tracks
No.	Title	Length
13.	"Let Me Go" (acoustic)	3:49
14.	"Be Somebody" (acoustic)	3:11
15.	"Landing in London" (acoustic)	4:47
16.	"My World" (acoustic)	2:59

US iTunes Store edition bonus track
No.	Title	Length
13.	"Be Somebody" (acoustic)	3:11

International digital edition bonus tracks
No.	Title	Length
13.	"Here Without You" (acoustic)	3:51
14.	"Away from the Sun" (acoustic)	3:44

UK digital edition bonus track
No.	Title	Length
15.	"Let Me Go" (acoustic)	3:49

== Personnel ==
3 Doors Down

- Brad Arnold – vocals
- Matt Roberts – lead guitar, backing vocals
- Chris Henderson – guitar, backing vocals
- Todd Harrell – bass guitar
- Daniel Adair – drums, backing vocals

Additional musicians

- Bob Seger – vocals on "Landing in London"
- Bekka Bramlett, Crystal Taliefero, Janet Kenyon, Amy Owsley and Kelley Norris – background vocals on "Father's Son"
- Nick Hoffman – banjo and violin on "Father's Son"
- Kristin Wilkinson, Anthony La Marchina, Mary Kathryn Van Osdale, David B. Angell (The Love Sponge String Quartet) – strings on "Here by Me" and "Landing in London"
- Kirk Kelsey and Kristin Wilkinson – string arrangements on "Here by Me" and "Landing in London"

Production

- Johnny K – producer, engineering
- Kirk Kelsey and Tadpole – additional engineering, digital editing
- Leslie Richter and Todd Schall – assistant engineering
- Andy Wallace – mixing at Emerald Studios, Nashville, TN
- John O'Mahony – Pro-Tools (assisted by Allen Ditto)
- Howie Weinberg – mastering at MasterDisk Studios, New York, NY
- Sandy Brummels – art direction
- Dean Karr – photography
- Karen Walker – design

== Charts ==
=== Weekly charts ===
Weekly chart performance for Seventeen Days
Chart (2005–2006)	Peak position
Australian Albums (ARIA)	54
Austrian Albums (Ö3 Austria)	12
Belgian Albums (Ultratop Flanders)	56
Canadian Albums (Billboard)	6
Danish Albums (Hitlisten)	14
Dutch Albums (Album Top 100)	26
Finnish Albums (Suomen virallinen lista)	17
French Albums (SNEP)	198
German Albums (Offizielle Top 100)	6
Portuguese Albums (AFP)	27
Swedish Albums (Sverigetopplistan)	11
Swiss Albums (Schweizer Hitparade)	15
US Billboard 200	1

=== Year-end charts ===
Year-end chart performance for Seventeen Days
Chart (2005)	Position
German Albums (Offizielle Top 100)	72
US Billboard 200	44

== Certifications ==
Certifications for Seventeen Days
Region	Certification	Certified units/sales
Canada (Music Canada)	Gold	50,000^{^}
Germany (BVMI)	Gold	100,000^{‡}
United States (RIAA)	Platinum	1,000,000^{^}
^{^} Shipments figures based on certification alone.^{‡} Sales+streaming figures based on certification alone.

== Appearances ==
- "Behind Those Eyes" was used as one of two theme songs for the World Wrestling Entertainment (WWE) event WrestleMania 21 in 2005.
