= Markoolio =

Finnish-Swedish singer (born 1975)

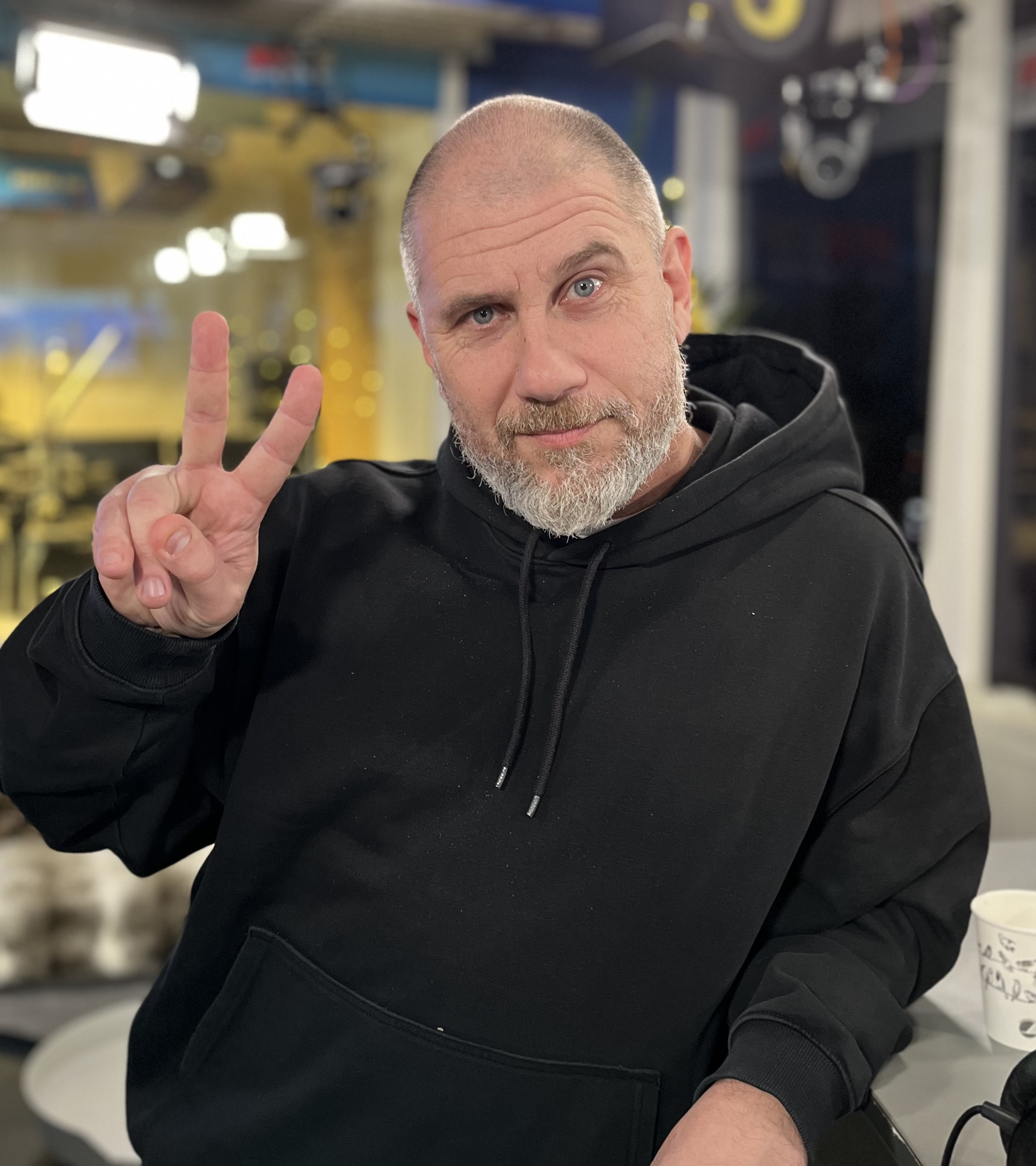
- Markoolio in 2022
- Born: Marko Kristian Lehtosalo; 1 January 1975 (age 51); Lahti, Finland
- Other name: Markoolio
- Occupations: Singer; songwriter; rapper; actor; comedian
- Years active: 1998–present
- Musical career
- Genres: Pop; hip hop; comedy rap
- Instrument: Vocals
- Website: markoolio.com

Marko Kristian Lehtosalo (born 1 January 1975), better known as Markoolio, is a Swedish-Finnish singer, songwriter, rapper, actor, and comedian. His stage name Markoolio is a portmanteau of his first name Marko and the stage name of the American rapper Coolio.

== Biography ==
Lehtosalo was born in Lahti, Finland. When Lehtosalo was six months old, his family migrated from Finland to Sweden where he grew up completing primary and secondary school in the small Stockholm suburb of Orminge. Following the completion of his compulsory military service as a coastal ranger sniper in Ekenäs, Finland, he returned to Sweden. There, he was allegedly discovered by producers when rapping on a commuter train in Stockholm; however, this story has been revealed to be a fabrication.

Markoolio is known in particular for his humorous songs dealing with partying, drinking, and girls such as "Sommar och sol" ("Summer and sun"), "Vi drar till fjällen" ("We're headin' for the mountains") and "Sola och bada i Piña Colada" ("Sunbathing and swimming in Piña Colada"); his songs mocking contemporary life and phenomena such as "Åka pendeltåg" ("Riding the commuter train") and "Värsta schlagern" ("The goddam' Schlager [song]"); and songs relating to his native Finland such as "Drömmen om Finland" (The dream of Finland) and "Jag orkar inte mer" (I can't take it anymore).

Markoolio has released nine studio albums, hosted and participated in numerous television and radio programs, and won several prizes and awards such as Male Artist of the Year at the Swedish Nickelodeon Kids Choice Awards 2007. He is also the owner of a nightclub and the board member of British company Netgames Holdings which he reportedly owns 3.3 percent of. Markoolio was one of the hosts for Talang on TV4 in 2009. He also played the titular character of Doktor Mugg and starred as Tyke Mörbult in Hem till Midgård. Markoolio was formerly a contestant on Let's Dance 2013, a contest he subsequently won, dancing with Cecilia Ehrling.

On 19 November 2013, Markoolio tried to disrupt the sleep of the Portugal national football team ahead of the second leg of their World Cup play-off with Sweden. He started a "private concert" at 7:15 a.m. in front of the Portuguese team's hotel.

== Discography ==
=== Albums ===
Year	Album Information	Peak position SWE	IFPI Certification
1998	Sticker hårt	4	Platinum
1999	Dikter från ett hjärta	3	3× Platinum
2001	Tjock och lycklig	1	2× Platinum
2003	I skuggan av mig själv	1	Platinum
2004	Suomessa Syntynyt	—	
2004	Bäst Off	9	Gold
2007	Värsta plattan	2	Platinum
2008	Jag är konst	30	
2012	Jag är Markoolio	3	

=== Singles ===
Year	Single	Chart peak	Album	Certification
Year	Single	Sweden	Album	Certification
1998	"Sommar och sol"	2	Sticker hårt	
1998	"Drömmen om Finland"	21	Sticker hårt	
1999	"Vi drar till fjällen"	1	Sticker hårt	Gold
1999	"Åka pendeltåg"	15	Sticker hårt	
1999	"Sola och bada i Piña Colada"	12	Dikter från ett hjärta	Gold
1999	"Millennium 2"	1	Dikter från ett hjärta	3× Platinum
2000	"Gör det igen"	2	Dikter från ett hjärta	Platinum
2000	"Mera mål!" (feat. Arne Hegerfors)	1	Dikter från ett hjärta	3× Platinum
2001	"Rocka på" (with The Boppers)	1	Tjock och lycklig	2× Platinum
2002	"Vi ska vinna!" (feat. Excellence)	3	Tjock och lycklig	2× Platinum
2002	"Jag orkar inte mer!"	2	Tjock och lycklig	Gold
2003	"Vilse i skogen"	1	I skuggan av mig själv	6× Platinum
2004	"In med bollen"	1	Bäst off	Platinum
2007	"Värsta schlagern" (with Linda Bengtzing)	1	Värsta plattan	2× Platinum
2007	"Ingen sommar utan reggae"	1	Värsta plattan	2× Platinum
2007	"Emma, Emma" (with Tilde Fröling)	17	Värsta plattan	
2007	"Idollåten"	24	Värsta plattan	
2008	"Sverige, det bästa på vår jord"	1	Jag är konst	
2008	"The Markoolio Anthem"	4	Jag är konst	
2009	"Kärlekssång från mig"	32	Jag är konst	
2012	"Borta bra men hemma bäst"	—	Jag är Markoolio	
2012	"En vecka i Phuket"	—	Jag är Markoolio	
2014	"Fredagslåten"	—	Non-album singles	2× Platinum
2017	"Bastukungen"	—	Non-album singles	Platinum
2017	"Tomtar på loftet"	—	Non-album singles	
2017	"Ge oss mål"	— (Note: "Ge oss mål" did not enter the Sverigetopplistan, but peaked at number 13 on the Swedish Heatseeker chart.)	Non-album singles	
2019	"Modell"	—	Non-album singles	
2022	"Kassanova" (with Young Earth Sauce)	59	Non-album singles	
2023	"Vatten & eld"	7	Non-album singles	
