= Let Me Go (3 Doors Down song) =

2005 single by 3 Doors Down

Single by 3 Doors Down

from the album Seventeen Days
- B-side: "Be Somebody" (acoustic)
- Released: November 22, 2004
- Length: 3:52
- Label: Republic; Universal
- Songwriters: Brad Arnold; Matt Roberts; Todd Harrell; Chris Henderson
- Producer: Johnny K

3 Doors Down singles chronology
| "Away from the Sun" (2003) | "Let Me Go" (2004) | "Behind Those Eyes" (2005) |

Music video
- "Let Me Go" on YouTube

"Let Me Go" is a song by American rock band 3 Doors Down, released on November 22, 2004, as the lead single from their third studio album, Seventeen Days (2005). The song peaked number 14 on both the US Billboard Hot 100 and Modern Rock Tracks charts, as well as number six on the Billboard Mainstream Rock Tracks chart.

== Writing ==
According to 3 Doors Down lead singer Brad Arnold, "Let Me Go" was originally written for Spider-Man 2 soundtrack but didn't end up on the film's soundtrack. Arnold explained that "we liked it so much, we kept it for ourselves." Arnold wanted to keep the song, "because it also had meaning to me personally." Lyrically "Let Me Go" is a break-up song.

== Music video ==
The music video was directed by Wayne Isham and features actors Jodi Lyn O'Keefe and Jesse Metcalfe as two young high school students whose relationship seems to be the ideal, but which soon is shattered by a devastating secret. O'Keefe appears to be nothing more than the average all-American type on the surface, but her secret night job as a stripper at a strip club called Jumbo's Clown Room shows a different side. Metcalfe, upon realizing this, acts coldly and eventually separates from her. The rest of the video shows them both showing remorse over this hasty decision. At the very end, Metcalfe discovers that O'Keefe's night efforts was only being used to support her final secret: her young baby daughter. Throughout the clip, the band is seen performing on a rainy city street illuminated with several backlights. In an interview with 3 Doors Down, it was revealed that a later idea was that O'Keefe hated being a stripper.

== Track listings ==
UK 7-inch single

A. "Let Me Go" (rock version) – 4:00
B. "Be Somebody" (acoustic) – 3:18

Australian CD single

1. "Let Me Go" – 4:00
2. "Be Somebody" (acoustic) – 3:18
3. "Kryptonite" (live) – 4:14
4. "That Smell" (live) – 6:01

== Charts ==
=== Weekly charts ===
Weekly chart performance for "Let Me Go"
| Chart (2005) | Peak position |
|---|---|
| Australia (ARIA) | 55 |
| Austria (Ö3 Austria Top 40) | 46 |
| Canada CHR/Pop Top 30 (Radio & Records) | 7 |
| Canada Hot AC Top 30 (Radio & Records) | 2 |
| Germany (GfK) | 55 |
| Greece (IFPI) | 37 |
| Netherlands (Dutch Top 40) | 18 |
| Netherlands (Single Top 100) | 50 |
| Scotland Singles (Official Charts) | 86 |
| Sweden (Sverigetopplistan) | 16 |
| UK Singles (OCC) | 133 |
| UK Physical Singles (OCC) | 88 |
| US Billboard Hot 100 | 14 |
| US Adult Contemporary (Billboard) | 37 |
| US Adult Pop Airplay (Billboard) | 3 |
| US Alternative Airplay (Billboard) | 14 |
| US Mainstream Rock (Billboard) | 6 |
| US Pop Airplay (Billboard) | 2 |

=== Year-end charts ===
Year-end chart performance for "Let Me Go"
| Chart (2005) | Position |
|---|---|
| Netherlands (Dutch Top 40) | 97 |
| US Billboard Hot 100 | 38 |
| US Adult Top 40 (Billboard) | 5 |
| US Mainstream Rock Tracks (Billboard) | 25 |
| US Mainstream Top 40 (Billboard) | 12 |
| US Modern Rock Tracks (Billboard) | 35 |

== Certifications ==
Certifications for "Let Me Go"
| Region | Certification | Certified units/sales |
|---|---|---|
| United States (RIAA) | Platinum | 1,000,000^{‡} |
^{‡} Sales+streaming figures based on certification alone.

== Release history ==
Release dates and formats for "Let Me Go"
| Region | Date | Format(s) | Label(s) | Ref. |
|---|---|---|---|---|
| United States | November 22, 2004 | Mainstream rock; active rock; triple A radio; alternative radio | Republic; Universal | |
| United States | January 3, 2005 | Contemporary hit; hot AC radio | Republic; Universal | |
| Australia | March 7, 2005 | CD | Republic; Universal | |
