= Cosmos Music Group =

Swedish independent record company

- Industry: Music
- Predecessor: Bonnier Amigo Music Group
- Founded: 2001; 25 years ago
- Headquarters: Stockholm, Sweden
- Website: www.cosmos-music.com

Bonnier Amigo Music Group

Cosmos Music, formerly Bonnier Amigo Music Group (BAMG), is an independent record company based in Stockholm, Sweden. It was formed in 2001, when record company and distributor Amigo Musik merged with the record company Bonnier Music. BAMG claimed to be the biggest independent record company in Scandinavia at the time.

BAMG signed acts including Helena Paparizou, Sunrise Avenue, Madcon, Amy Diamond and Sofia Karlsson. BAMG was also the Scandinavian representative of some of the most influential independent record companies in Europe, including ACT, Dramatico, Cooking Vinyl, Cooperative Music, Epitaph, Roadrunner Records and MNW.

In late 2009, Carl Fredik Ekander, Cai Leitner, Kent Isaacs and Christian Drougge bought Bonnier Amigo from Bonnier Group and subsequently renamed the company Cosmos Music.

== Sub-labels ==
- Alfie
- Amigo
- Bauta
- BITD
- Cosmos
- Dope
- Rotate
- Supernova
- Tri-Sound

== See also ==
- List of record labels
